= Lingya Sports Park metro station =

Metro station in Lingya, Kaohsiung, Taiwan

Coordinates: 22°37′38″N 120°20′05″E

Lingya Sports Park O9 苓雅運動園區
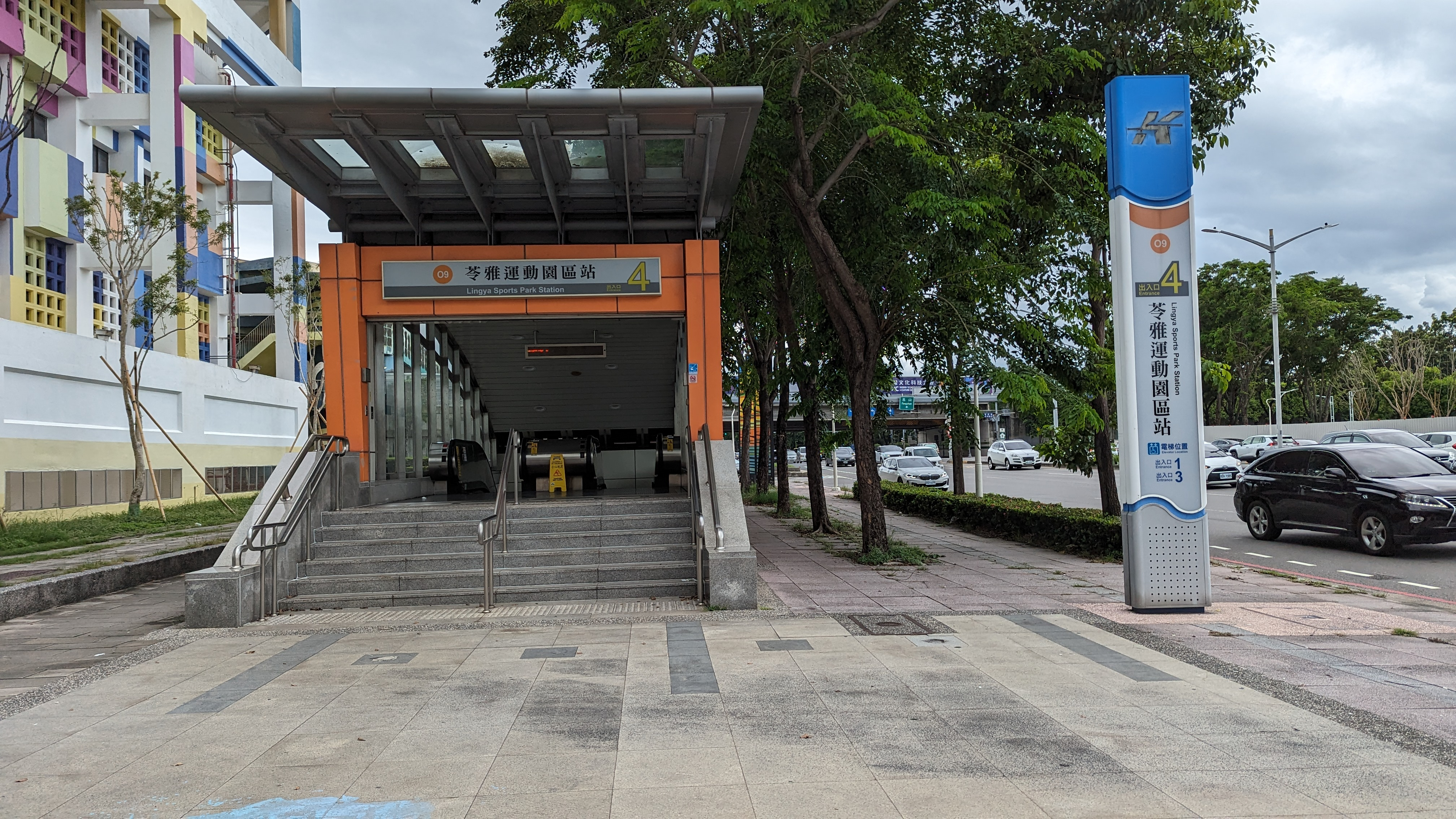
- Exit 4 of Lingya Sports Park station

General information
- Location: Lingya, Kaohsiung; Taiwan
- Operated by: Kaohsiung Rapid Transit Corporation
- Line: Orange line (O9)
- Platforms: One island platform
- Connections: Bus stop

Construction
- Structure type: Underground
- Accessible: Yes

History
- Opened: 2008-09-14

Passengers
- 3,059 daily (Jan. 2011)

Services
Preceding station	Kaohsiung Metro	Following station
Wukuaicuo towards Hamasen	Orange line	Weiwuying towards Daliao
Location

Lingya Sports Park metro station
- Traditional Chinese: 苓雅運動園區車站
- Simplified Chinese: 苓雅运动园区车站
Transcriptions
Standard Mandarin
- Hanyu Pinyin: Língyǎ yùndòng yuánqū Chēzhàn
- Bopomofo: ㄌㄧㄥˊ ㄧㄚˇ ㄩㄣˋ ㄉㄨㄥˋ ㄩㄢˊ ㄑㄩ ㄔㄜ ㄓㄢˋ
- Wade–Giles: Ling^{2}-ya^{3}-yün^{4}-tung^{4}-yüan^{2}-ch'ü^{1} Ch'ê^{1}chan^{4}
- Tongyong Pinyin: Língyǎ yùndòng yuáncyu Chējhàn

Lingya Sports Park (formerly Martial Arts Stadium) is a station on the Orange line of Kaohsiung MRT in Lingya District, Kaohsiung, Taiwan.

== Station overview ==
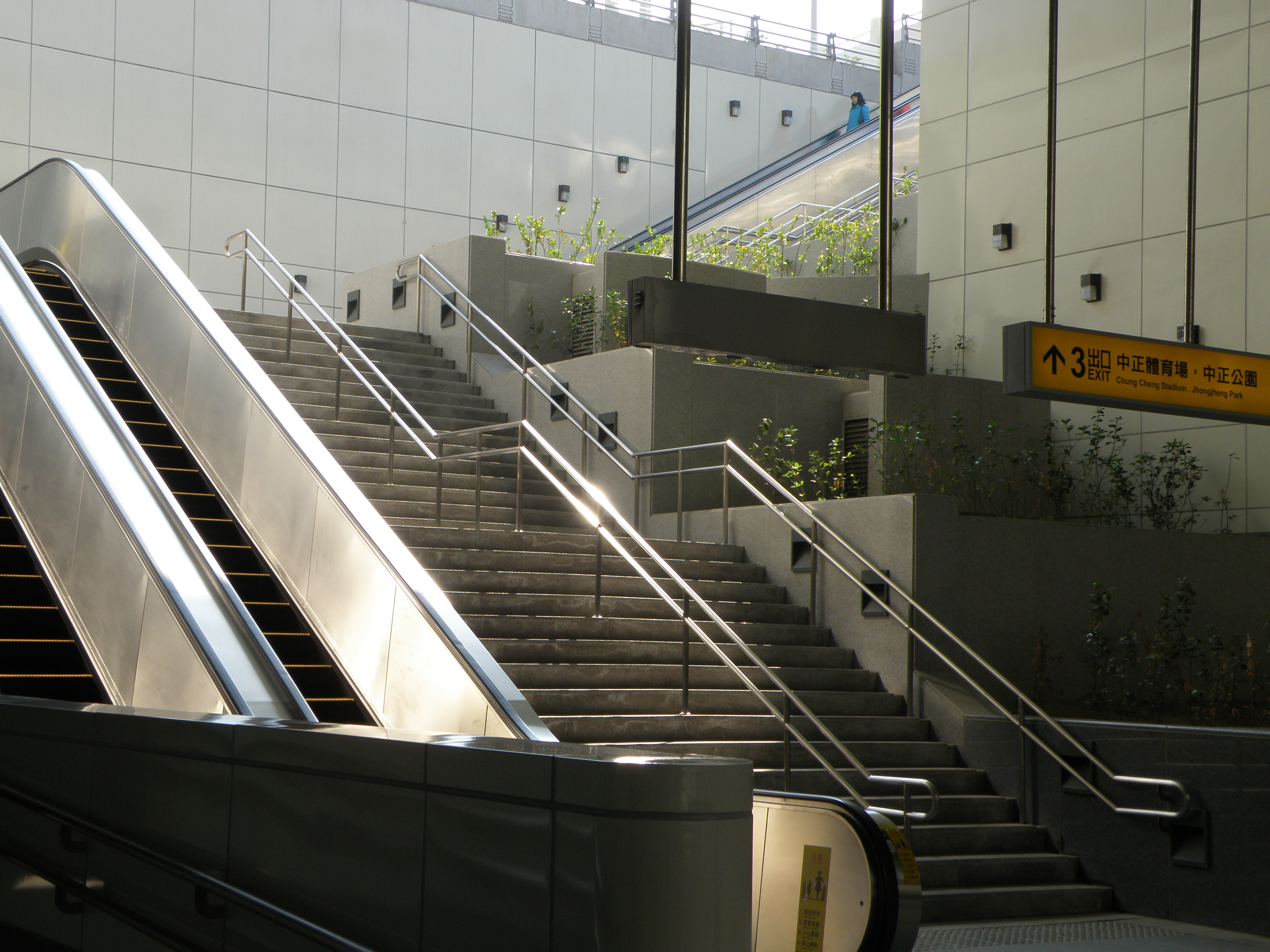
Exit 3 of Lingya Sports Park station

This is a two-level, underground station with an island platform and four exits. It is 201 meters long and is located on Jhongjheng 1st Rd across from Martial Art Stadium. Other sporting facilities nearby include the Olympic Pool, Sports Stadium and Extreme Sports Arena.

It was renamed Lingya Sports Park station in 2024.

=== Station layout ===
Street level	Entrance/exit	Entrance/exit
B1	Concourse	Lobby, information desk, automatic ticket machines, one-way faregates, restrooms (near exit 1)
B2	Platform 1	← KMRT Orange line toward Hamasen (Wukuaicuo)
B2	Island platform, doors will open on the left
B2	Platform 2	KMRT Orange line toward Daliao (Weiwuying) →

=== Exits ===
- Exit 1: Jhongjheng 1st Rd., Furen Rd., Jhongjheng Elementary School, Martial Arts Stadium (west), Kaohsiung Japanese School, Kaohsiung Guandi Temple, Wumiao Market
- Exit 2: Jhongjheng 1st Rd., Mingde St., Kaohsiung Extreme Sports Ground, Fu'an Park, Kaohsiung City Local Office of Bureau of Labor Insurance
- Exit 3: Jhongjheng 1st Rd., Wuying Rd., Chungcheng Stadium, Sports Development Bureau, Kaohsiung City Government
- Exit 4: Jhongjheng 1st Rd., Martial Arts Stadium (east), Kaohsiung International Swimming Pool, Zhengdao Park

== Around the station ==
- Jhongjheng Rd. Interchange, National Highway No. 1
- Kaohsiung City Lingya Sports Center
- Jhongjheng Park
- Kaohsiung Japanese School
