= Dadong metro station =

Metro station in Fengshan, Kaohsiung, Taiwan

Dadong O13 大東
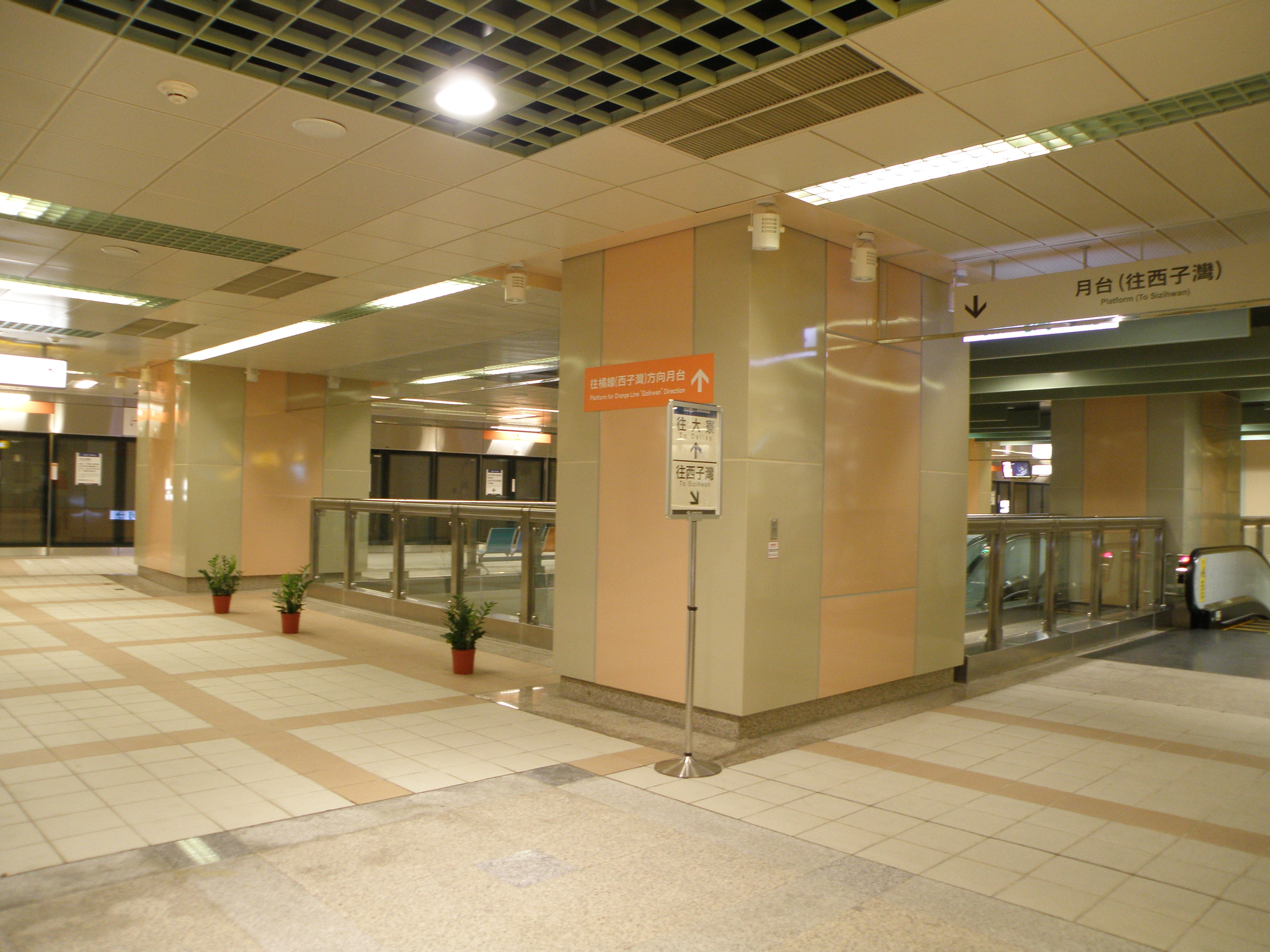
- Dadong station platform 2 concourse

General information
- Location: Fongshan, Kaohsiung; Taiwan
- Coordinates: 22°37′31″N 120°21′47″E
- Operated by: Kaohsiung Rapid Transit Corporation
- Line: Orange line (O13)
- Platforms: Two split platforms
- Connections: Bus stop

Construction
- Structure type: Underground
- Accessible: Yes

History
- Opened: 2008-09-14

Passengers
- 2,387 daily (Jan. 2011)

Services
Preceding station	Kaohsiung Metro	Following station
Fongshan towards Hamasen	Orange line	Fongshan Junior High School towards Daliao
Location

Dadong metro station
- Traditional Chinese: 大東站
- Simplified Chinese: 大东站
Transcriptions
Standard Mandarin
- Hanyu Pinyin: Dàdōng Zhàn
- Bopomofo: ㄉㄚˋ ㄉㄨㄥ ㄓㄢˋ
- Wade–Giles: Ta^{4}tung^{1} Chan^{4}
- Tongyong Pinyin: Dàdōng Jhàn

Dadong is a station on the Orange line of Kaohsiung MRT in Fongshan District, Kaohsiung, Taiwan.

== Station overview ==
This is a four-level, underground station with two stacked side platforms and two exits. The station is 151 metres long and is located at the intersection of Guangyuan Rd. and Dadong 1st Rd.

=== Station layout ===
Street level	Entrance/exit	Entrance/exit
B1	Passage level	24time side level work, shop district
B2	Platform 2	KMRT Orange line toward Daliao (Fongshan Jr. High School) →
B2	Side platform, doors will open on the left
B2	Concourse	Lobby, toilets, one-way ticket machine, information desk
B3	Platform 1	← KMRT Orange line toward Hamasen (Fongshan)
B3	Side platform, doors will open on the right

=== Exits ===
- Exit 1: Dadong Park
- Exit 2: Dadong Elementary School, Dadong Arts Center

== Around the station ==
- Dadong Arts Center
- Fengshan Tiangong Temple
- Fengshan Longshan Temple
- Kaohsiung City Symphony Orchestra
- Republic of China Military Academy
- Dadong Elementary School
- Dadong Wetlands Park
- Fengshan County New Town East Wicket Gate (鳳山縣新城東便門)
- Beimen Park (Fengshan)
- Nanmen Park (Fengshan)
- Fengshan Bus Station (鳳山轉運站)
- Fengshan District Office
