= Formosa Boulevard metro station =

Metro station in Xinxing, Kaohsiung, Taiwan

Formosa Boulevard / 美麗島

Chinese name
- Traditional Chinese: 美麗島站
- Simplified Chinese: 美丽岛站
Transcriptions
Standard Mandarin
- Hanyu Pinyin: Měilìdaǒ Zhàn
- Bopomofo: ㄇㄟˇ ㄌㄧˋ ㄉㄠˇ ㄓㄢˋ
- Wade–Giles: Mei^{3}-li^{4}-tao^{3} Chan^{4}
- Tongyong Pinyin: Měilìtaǒ Jhàn
Southern Min
- Hokkien POJ: Bí-lē-tó Chām
- Tâi-lô: Bí-lē-tó Tsām

Former name
- Traditional Chinese: 大港埔站
- Simplified Chinese: 大港埔站
Transcriptions
Standard Mandarin
- Hanyu Pinyin: Dàgǎngpǔ Zhàn
- Bopomofo: ㄉㄚˋ ㄍㄤˇ ㄆㄨˇ ㄓㄢˋ
- Wade–Giles: Ta^{4}-gang^{3}-pu^{3} Chan^{4}
- Tongyong Pinyin: Dàgǎngpǔ Jhàn

General information
- Location: Sinsing, Kaohsiung; Taiwan
- Coordinates: 22°37′53.2″N 120°18′7.1″E
- Operator: Kaohsiung Rapid Transit Corporation
- Lines: Red line (R10); Orange line (O5)
- Platforms: 2 side platforms (upper level); 1 island platform (lower level)
- Connections: Bus stop

Construction
- Structure type: Underground
- Accessible: Yes

Other information
- Station code: /

History
- Opened: 2008-09-14

Passengers
- 11,551 daily (Jan. 2011)

Services
Preceding station	Kaohsiung Metro	Following station
Kaohsiung Main Station towards Gangshan	Red line	Central Park towards Siaogang
Cianjin towards Hamasen	Orange line	Sinyi Elementary School towards Daliao
Location

Formosa Boulevard (Chinese: 美麗島站; Pe̍h-ōe-jī: Bí-lē-tó-chām) is a station of Kaohsiung Metro located in Sinsing District, Kaohsiung, Taiwan. It is the interchange station between the Red line and the Orange line.

Formosa Boulevard station is named after the Formosa Boulevard project, a remodelling of Kaohsiung's Jhongshan Road in preparation for the 2009 World Games. Formosa Boulevard is in turn named after the Formosa Incident. Transferring from the Red line to the Orange line (or vice versa) takes roughly 4 minutes.

== Station design ==
The station is a three-level, underground station with an island platform and two side platforms. It is located at the junction of Jhongjheng and Jhongshan Road and has 11 exits. The Orange line station is 334 metres long, while the Red line station is 209 metres long.

The station is known for its "Dome of Light", the largest glass work in the world. It was designed by Italian artist Narcissus Quagliata. It is 30 metres in diameter and covers an area of 2,180 square metres. It is made up of 4,500 glass panels by the German Glassstudio Derix and original glass rondels from Murano, Italy. The dome is offered as a venue for weddings.

Another spectacular feature of the station is the four glass pedestrian entrances that lead from street level down into the station, designed by renowned Japanese architecture firm, Shin Takamatsu Architect & Associates.

== Around the station ==
- Liouhe Night Market
- Kaohsiung General Post Office
- Sinsing Market
- Nanhua Shopping Street
- Kaohsiung Police Department, Sinsing Branch
- Jhongshan and Jhongjheng Road Wedding Street
