= Wukuaicuo metro station =

Rapid transit station in Lingya, Kaohsiung, Taiwan

Wukuaicuo O8 五塊厝
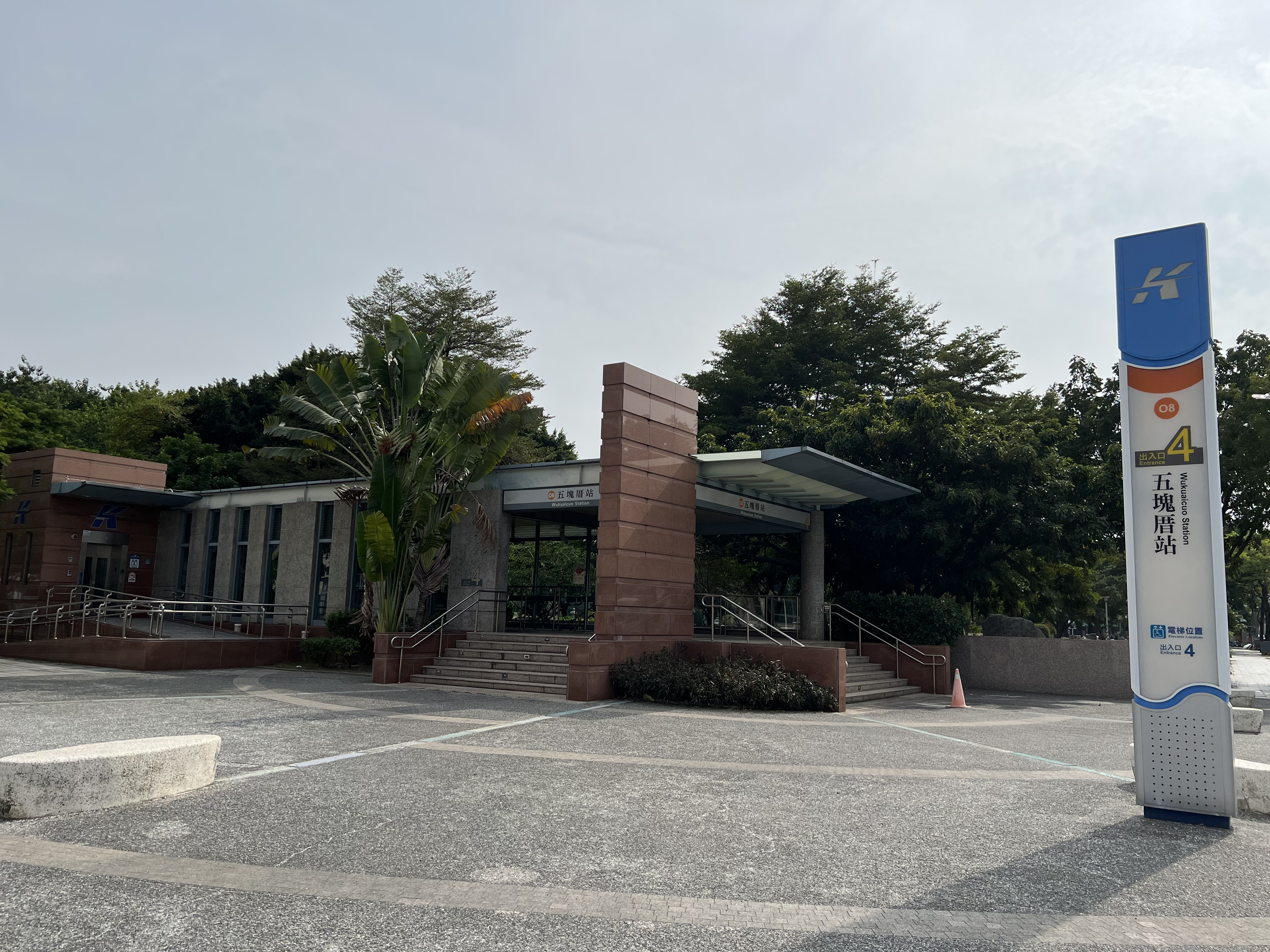
- Wukuaicuo station exit 4

General information
- Location: Lingya, Kaohsiung; Taiwan
- Coordinates: 22°37′46″N 120°19′40″E
- Operated by: Kaohsiung Rapid Transit Corporation
- Line: Orange line (O8)
- Platforms: One island platform
- Connections: Bus stop

Construction
- Structure type: Underground
- Accessible: Yes

History
- Opened: 2008-09-14

Passengers
- 2,906 daily (Jan. 2011)

Services
Preceding station	Kaohsiung Metro	Following station
Cultural Center towards Hamasen	Orange line	Lingya Sports Park towards Daliao
Location

Wukuaicuo metro station
- Traditional Chinese: 五塊厝車站
- Simplified Chinese: 五塊厝车站
Transcriptions
Standard Mandarin
- Hanyu Pinyin: Wǔkuaìcuò Chēzhàn
- Bopomofo: ㄨˇ ㄎㄨㄞˋ ㄘㄨㄛˋ ㄔㄜ ㄓㄢˋ
- Wade–Giles: Wu^{3}-k'uai^{4}-ts'o^{4} Ch'ê^{1}chan^{4}
- Tongyong Pinyin: Wǔkuaìcuò Chējhàn

Wukuaicuo (Chinese: 五塊厝) is a station on the Orange line of Kaohsiung MRT in Lingya District, Kaohsiung, Taiwan.

== Station overview ==
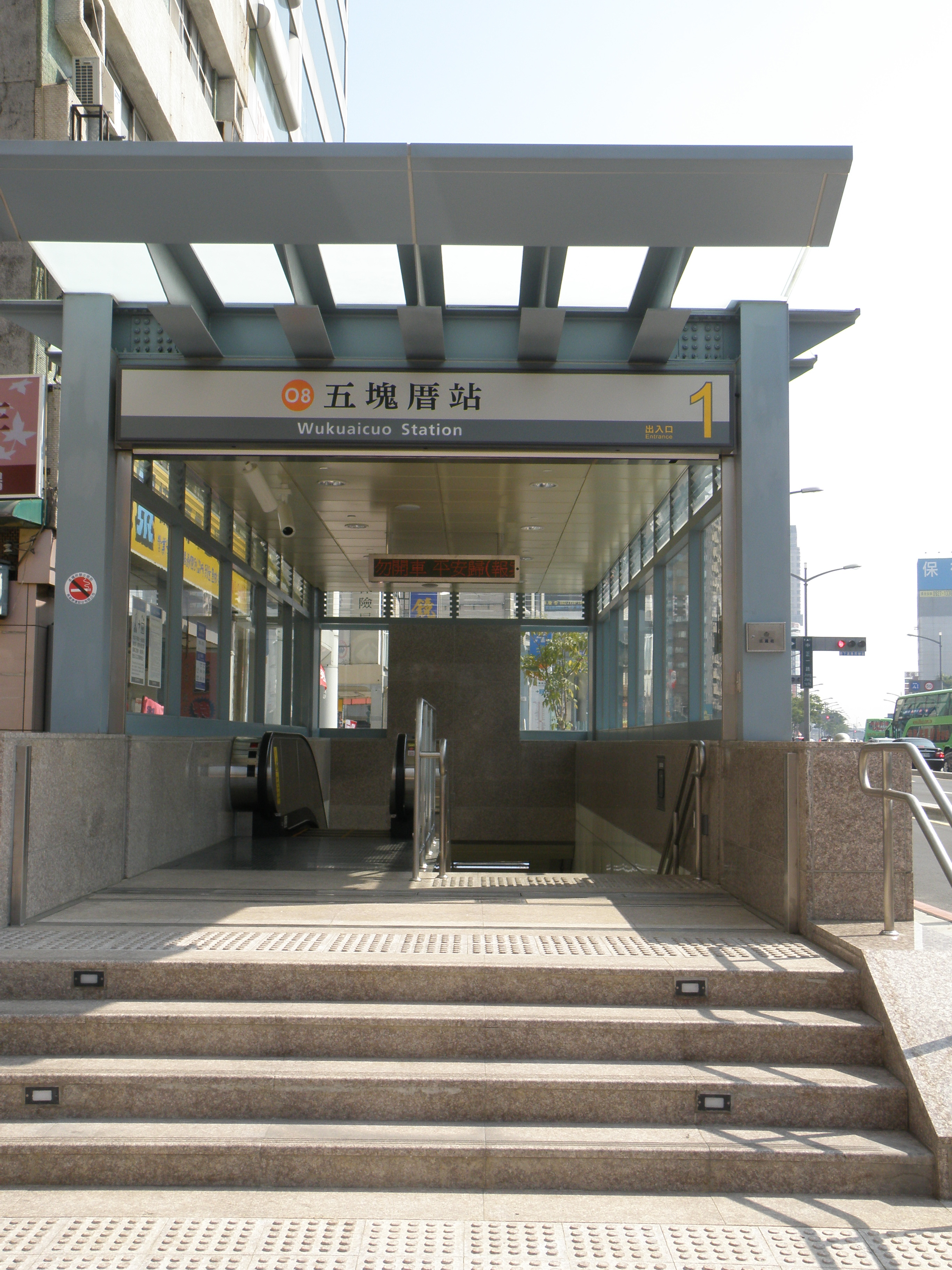
Wukuaicuo station exit 1

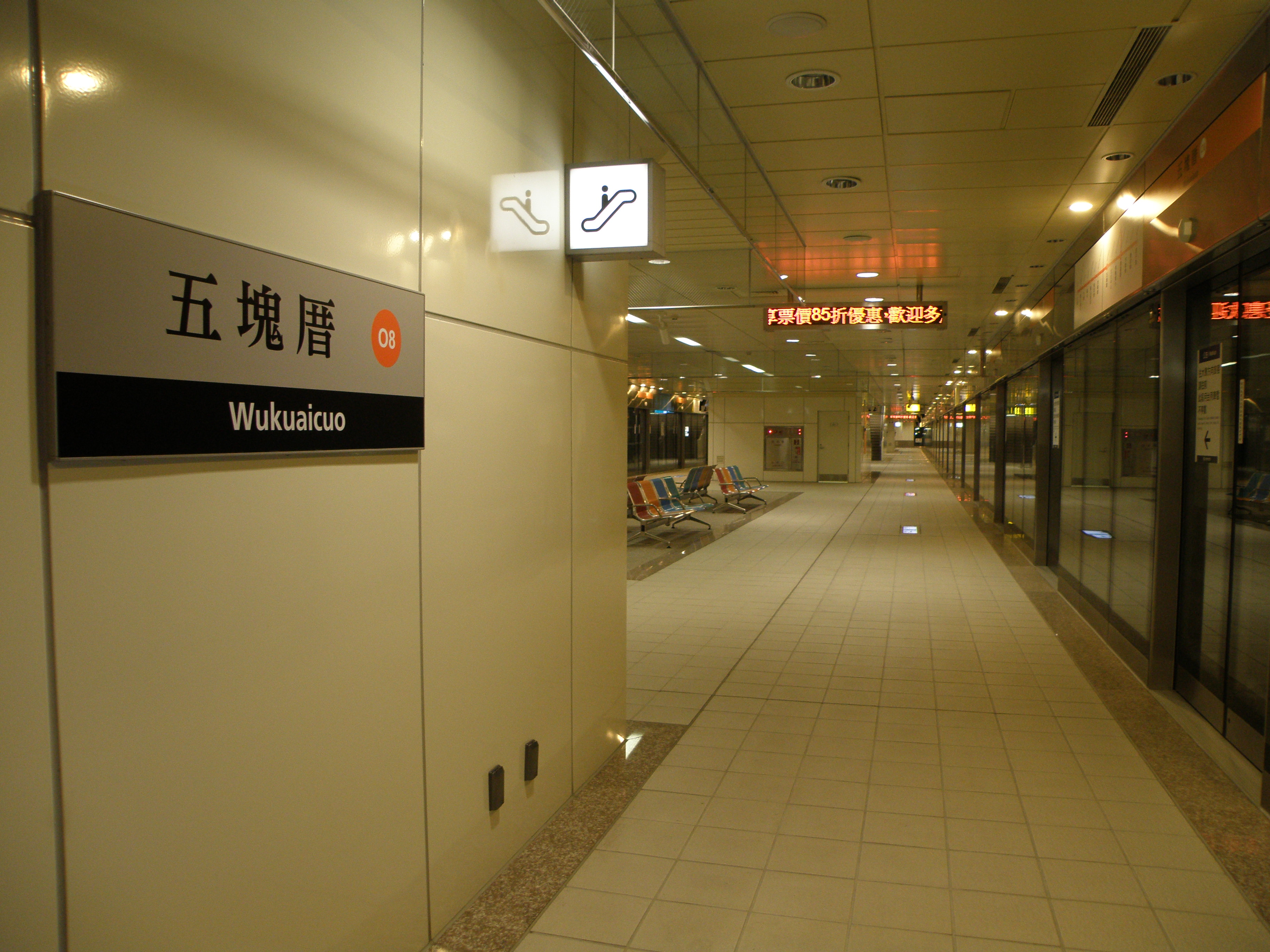
Wukuaicuo station platform

This is a two-level underground station with an island platform and six exits. It is 206 metres long and is located at the intersection of Jhongjheng 1st Rd and Fude Rd.

=== Station layout ===
Street level	Entrance/exit	Entrance/exit
B1	Concourse	Lobby, information desk, automatic ticket machines, one-way faregates, restrooms (near exit 4)
B2	Platform 1	← KMRT Orange line toward Hamasen (Cultural Center)
B2	Island platform, doors will open on the left
B2	Platform 2	KMRT Orange line toward Daliao (Martial Arts Stadium) →

=== Exits ===
- Exit 1: Jhongjheng 1st Rd. (north)
- Exit 2: Fude 2nd Rd. (west), Wumiao Rd.
- Exit 3: Jhongjheng 1st Rd. (south), Fude 3rd Rd.
- Exit 4: Chen Jhonghe Mausoleum, Fude 3rd Rd.
- Exit 5: Fude 2nd Rd. (east), Wumiao Rd.
- Exit 6: Jhengyan Rd. (north), Jianmin Rd.

== Around the station ==
- Tomb of Chen Jhong-he
- Kaohsiung Guandi Temple
- National Science and Technology Museum
