= Dadong Arts Center =

Art center in Fengshan, Kaohsiung, Taiwan

- 大東文化藝術中心
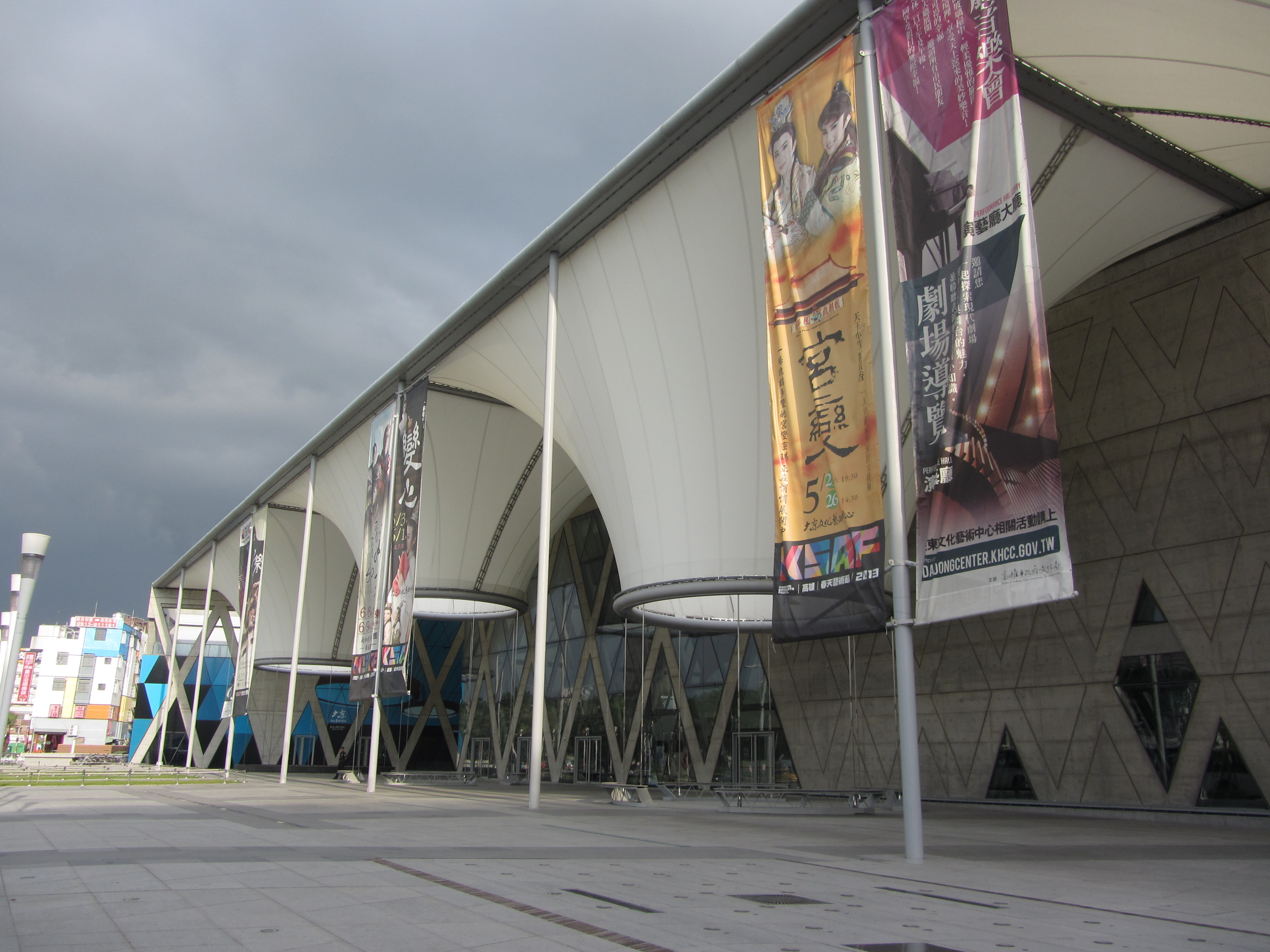
- Interactive map of the Dadong Arts Center area

General information
- Type: art center
- Location: Fengshan, Kaohsiung, Taiwan
- Coordinates: 22°37′30.2″N 120°21′48.3″E
- Construction started: September 2008
- Completed: March 2012
- Opened: 2012
- Owner: Kaohsiung City Government

Technical details
- Floor area: 36,470 m^{2}

Design and construction
- Architects: MAYU architects, de Architekten Cie
- Structural engineer: Arup, Tien-Hun Engineering Consultant Inc.

Website
- Official website (in Chinese)

The Dadong Arts Center (traditional Chinese: 大東文化藝術中心; simplified Chinese: 大东文化艺术中心; pinyin: Dàdōng Wénhuà Yìshù Zhōngxīn) is an art center in Fengshan District, Kaohsiung, Taiwan.

== History ==
The construction of the center started in September 2008. It was completed in March 2012.

== Architecture ==
The center was designed by MAYU architects, de Architekten Cie and constructed by Arup and Tien-Hun Engineering Consultant Inc. It consists of theater, exhibition center, library and education center.

== Transportation ==
The center is accessible from Dadong Station of Kaohsiung MRT.

== See also ==
- List of tourist attractions in Taiwan
