= Fan Lai-chin =

Taiwanese politician

Fan Lai-chin MLY
- 方來進

Member of the Legislative Yuan
- In office 1 February 1993 – 31 January 1996
- Constituency: Republic of China

Personal details
- Born: 3 December 1951 (age 74)
- Party: Democratic Progressive Party (until 2005; since 2006)

Fan Lai-chin (Chinese: 方來進; 3 December 1951) is a Taiwanese politician who served on the Legislative Yuan from 1993 to 1996.

Between 1993 and 1996, Fan Lai-chin was a member of the Legislative Yuan, elected via Democratic Progressive Party list. He was head of the Kaohsiung City Government's labor bureau when the Kaohsiung MRT foreign workers scandal came to light in August 2005. Nine Kuomintang members of the Kaohsiung City Council sued Fan for malfeasance and forgery in September. Following his indictment in November, Fan was expelled from the Democratic Progressive Party.
