= Former Japanese Navy Fongshan Communication Center =

Radio station in Fengshan, Kaohsiung, Taiwan

- 原日本海軍鳳山無線電信所
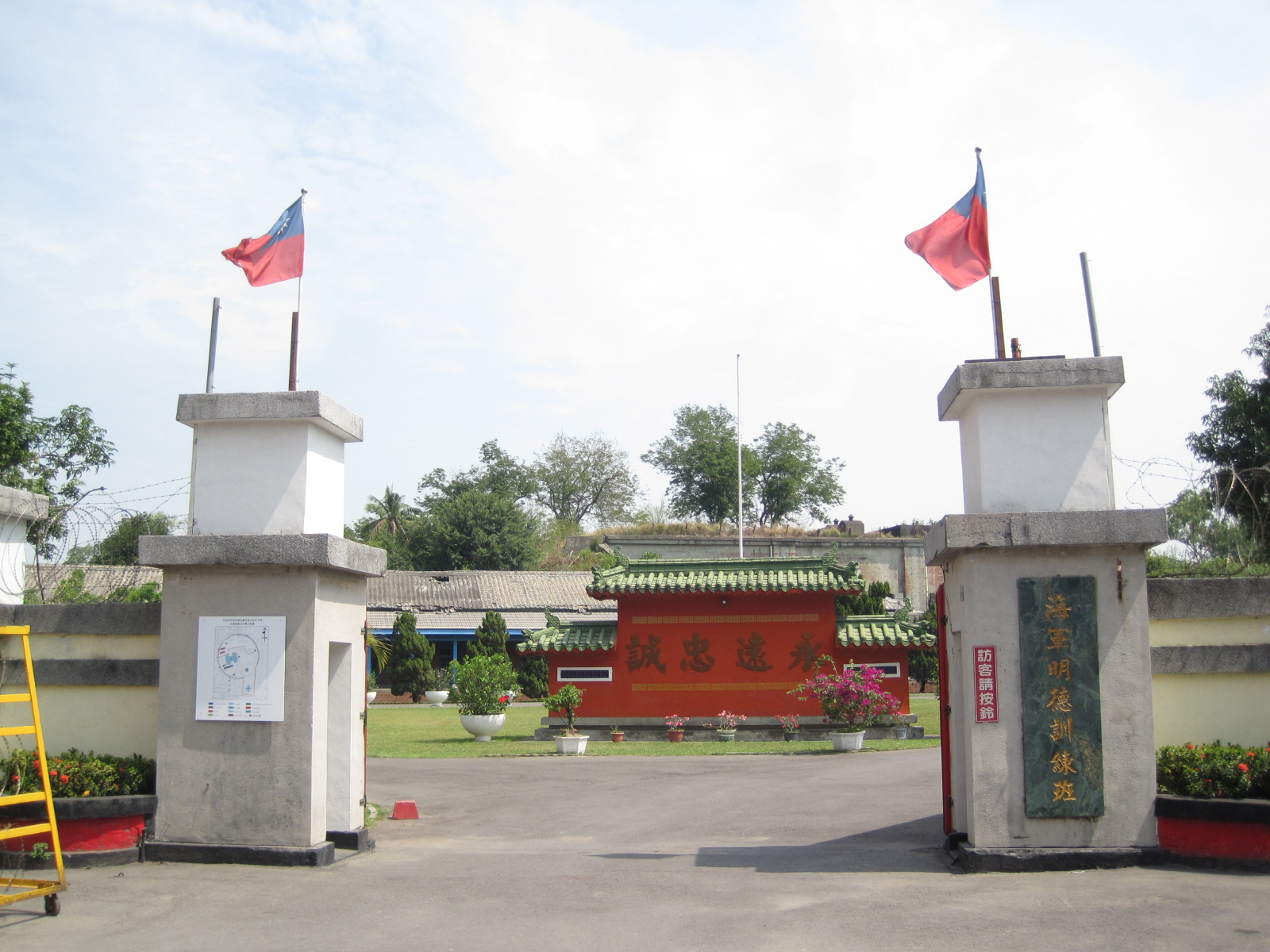
- Interactive map of the Former Japanese Navy Fongshan Communication Center area

General information
- Type: former radio station
- Location: Fengshan, Kaohsiung, Taiwan
- Coordinates: 22°37′47.6″N 120°22′26.0″E
- Completed: 1919

The Former Japanese Navy Fongshan Communication Center (traditional Chinese: 原日本海軍鳳山無線電信所; simplified Chinese: 原日本海军凤山无线电信所; pinyin: Yuán Rìběn Hǎijūn Fèngshān Wúxiàn Diànxìn Suǒ) was one of the three radio stations operated in Taiwan by the former Imperial Japanese Navy located in Fengshan District, Kaohsiung, Taiwan.

== History ==
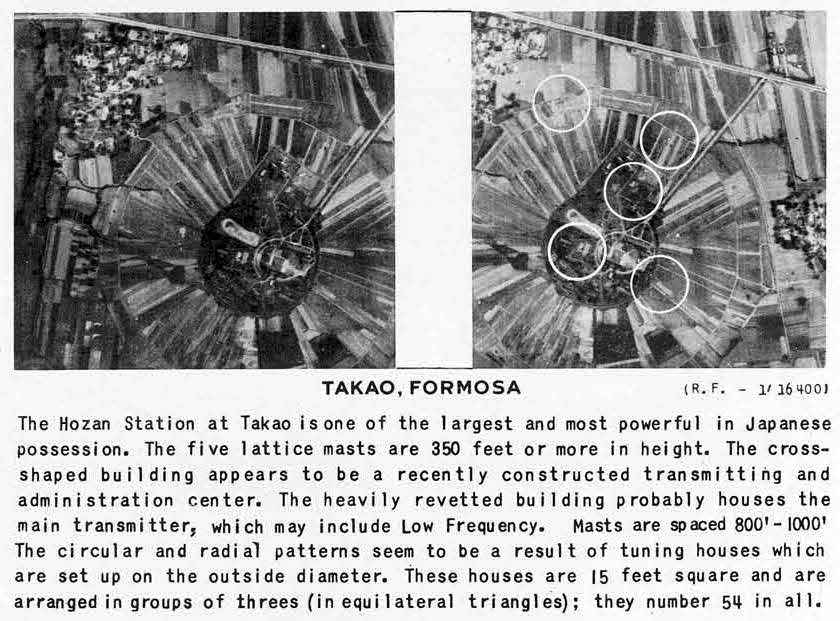
Information about the communication station provided in a U.S intelligence document c.1945.

The radio station was built in 1919, the first to be constructed in Taiwan by the Imperial Japanese Navy. Despite the military nature of the station, it was primarily used for civilian communication. After a major mechanical failure threatened maritime safety, the Japanese built another radio station at Sankaiseki (Sankuaico) (Note: Sankaiseki, Hozan and Takao were romanized in Japanese, the official language of Taiwan at the time. These place names were later romanized as Sankuaico, Fongshang and Kaohsiung respectively in Mandarin which is the official language of contemporary Taiwan government.) and consolidated it with the Hozan (Fongshan) station into the Takao Communication Unit in 1937. When the Second Sino-Japanese War broke out soon after, the Takao Communication Unit was used to maintain the south west Pacific communications of the Empire of Japan. It was also used as tactical radio to jam and monitor American and British movements on the sea and in the air.

After the handover of Taiwan from Japan to the Republic of China in 1945, the station was taken over by the Republic of China Navy and converted it into a navy boarding house. Over the next decade, the boarding house was used by the navy as an interrogation facility for servicemen accused of political crimes. In 1976, it became the Mingde Disciplinary Camp of the navy, where persistent disobedient servicemen were imprisoned. When the camp was decommissioned, it was turned into the Kaohsiung Military Dependent's Village Cultural Association.

== Transportation ==
The building is within walking distance north of Fongshan Junior High School Station of Kaohsiung MRT.

== See also ==
- List of tourist attractions in Taiwan
