= Wukuaicuo =

Wukuaicuo (Chinese: 五塊厝; pinyin: Wǔkuàicùo) can refer to the following:

- Wukuaicuo, Lingya District, Kaohsiung, Taiwan
- Wukuaicuo metro station
