= Kaohsiung Fisherman's Wharf =

Wharf in Gushan, Kaohsiung, Taiwan

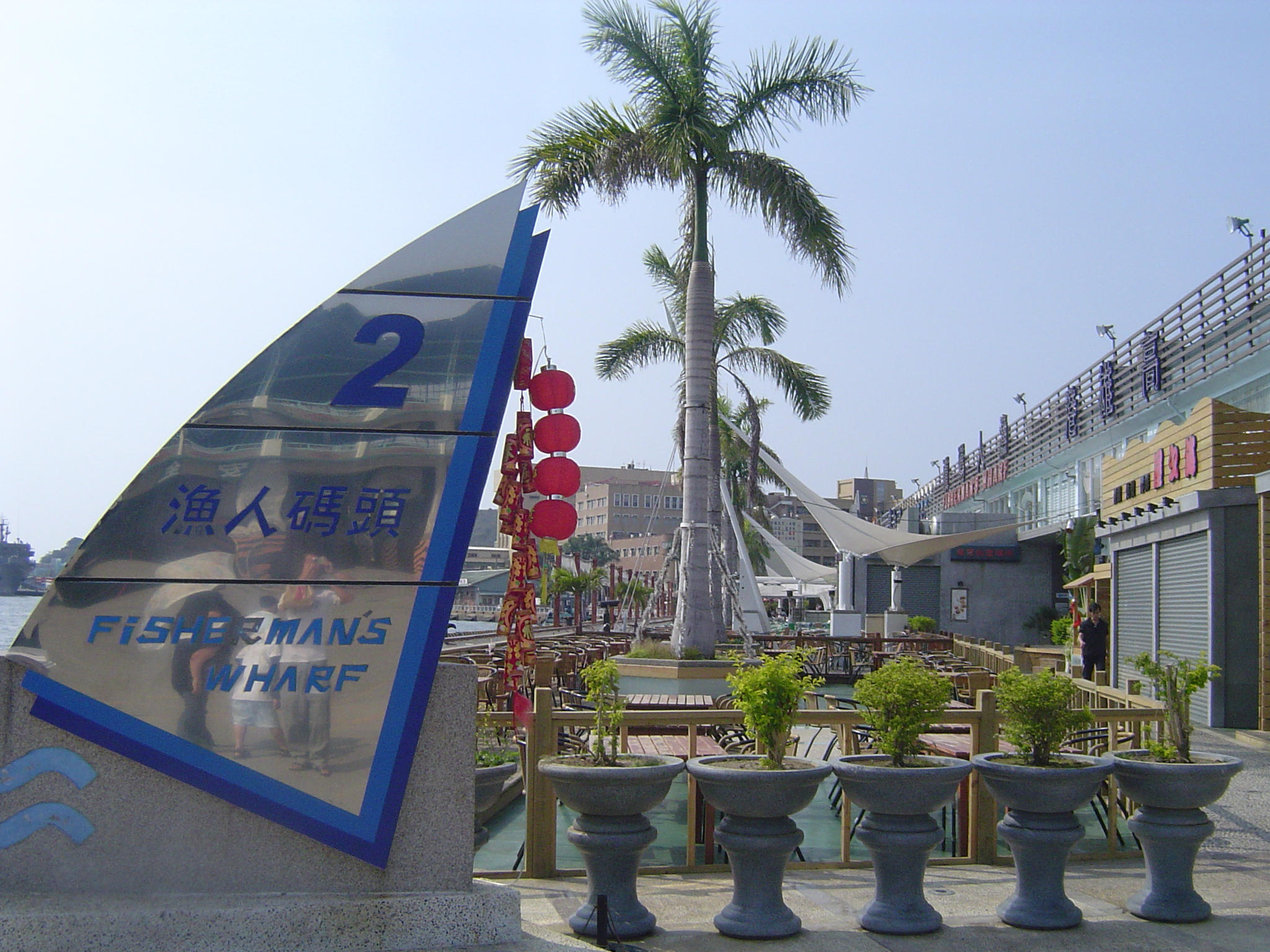
- Interactive map of Kaohsiung Fisherman's Wharf
- Location within Taiwan
- Native name: 高雄港漁人碼頭

Location
- Location: Gushan, Kaohsiung, Taiwan
- Coordinates: 22°37′08″N 120°16′37″E

Details
- Type of Harbor: Wharf

The Kaohsiung Fisherman's Wharf (also Fishermen's Wharf, Chinese: 高雄港漁人碼頭; pinyin: Gāoxiónggǎng Yúrén Mǎtóu) was a wharf in Gushan District, Kaohsiung, Taiwan. Today it is Kaohsiung Port Warehouse No. 2 (KW2), a multi-functional space combining cultural creative industries, exhibitions and dining.

== History ==
The wharf was originally the number 2 port of the port of Kaohsiung. Its previous function was exporting bananas, wood and steel. However, because of the transformation of economy and container automation, the function of the port declined gradually.

The government promotes the tourism industry in these years, so the number 2 port had the chance to become a sightseeing wharf, combining seaside scenery and food. The name of the wharf became a more cultural one as the Kaohsiung Fisherman's Wharf. Nowadays, it has become one of Kaohsiung's scenic spots, following the successful step of Urban Spotlight Arcade and Love River.

The lease of Kaohsiung Fisherman's Wharf was terminated on October 28, 2011

In 2018, Kaohsiung Port Warehouse No. 2 (KW2, Chinese: 棧貳庫; pinyin: Zhàn èr kù), the former Kaohsiung Fisherman's Wharf, has been reimagined and repurposed to combine cultural creativity, dining, and exhibition spaces within a completely open port area.

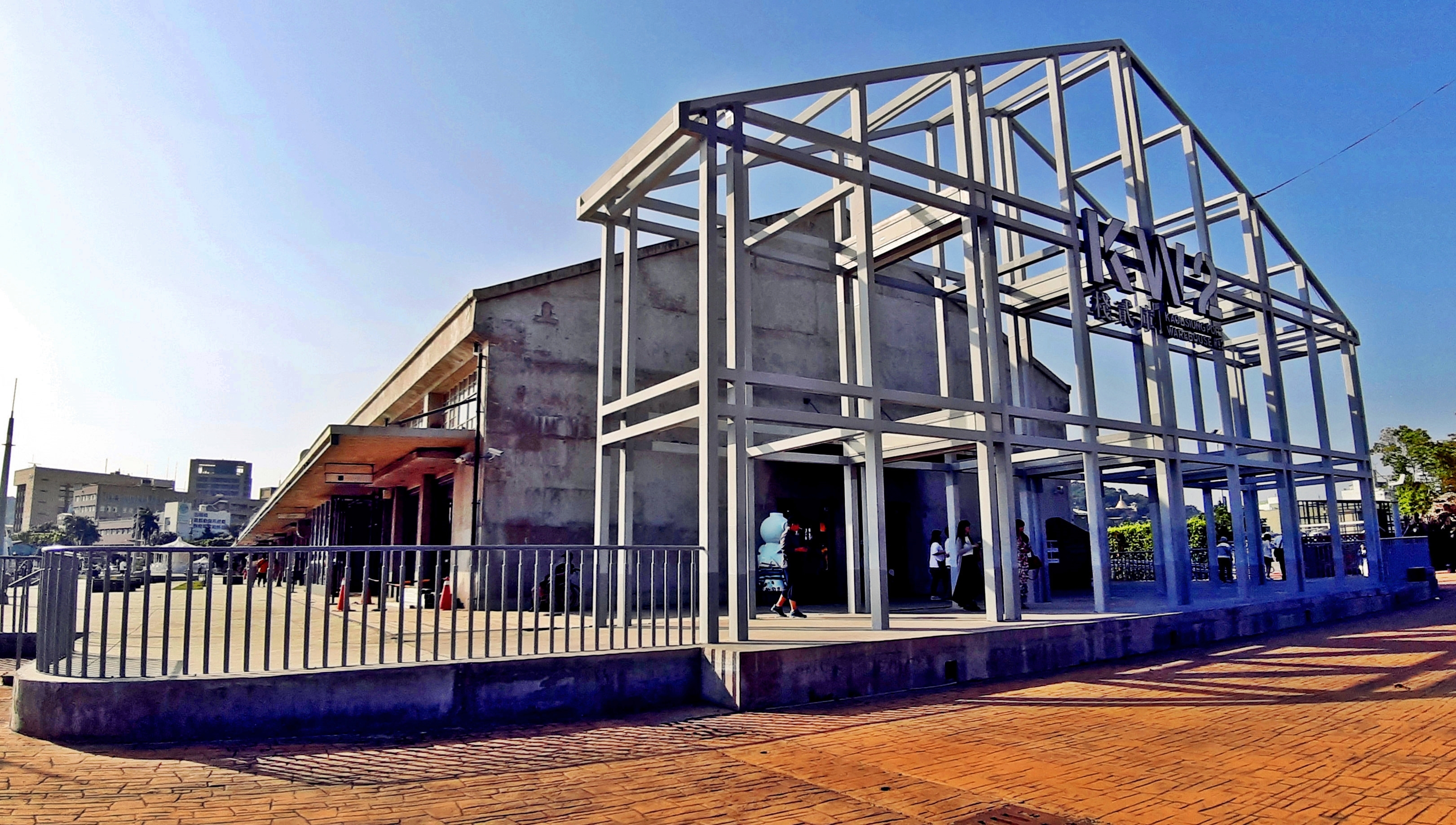
Kaohsiung Port Warehouse No. 2 (KW2)

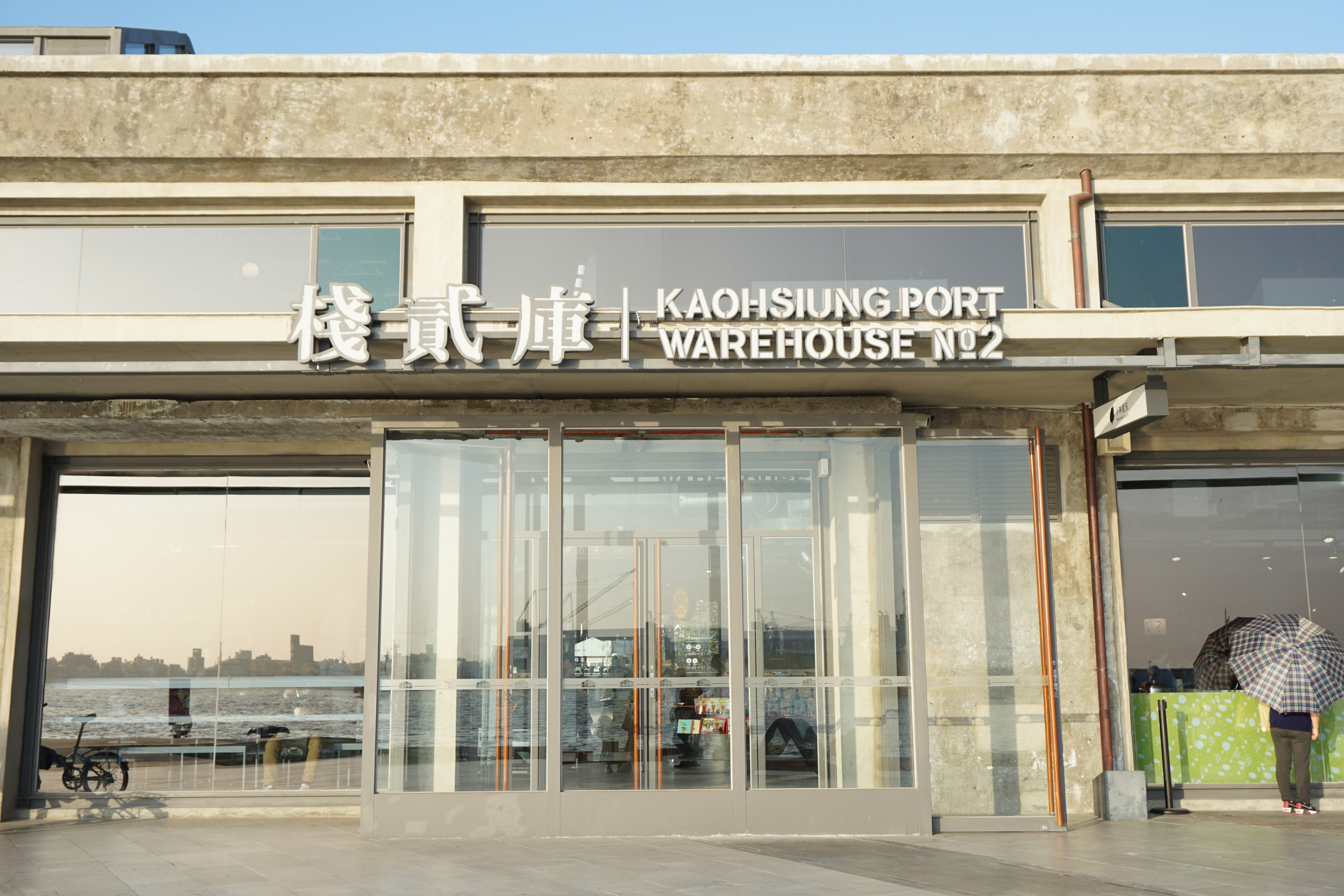
Kaohsiung Port Warehouse No. 2 (KW2)

== Transportation ==
The wharf is accessible within walking distance south east of Hamasen station of Kaohsiung MRT.

== See also ==
- List of tourist attractions in Taiwan
