= Fongshan Junior High School metro station =

Metro station in Fengshan, Kaohsiung, Taiwan

Fongshan Junior High School O14 鳳山國中
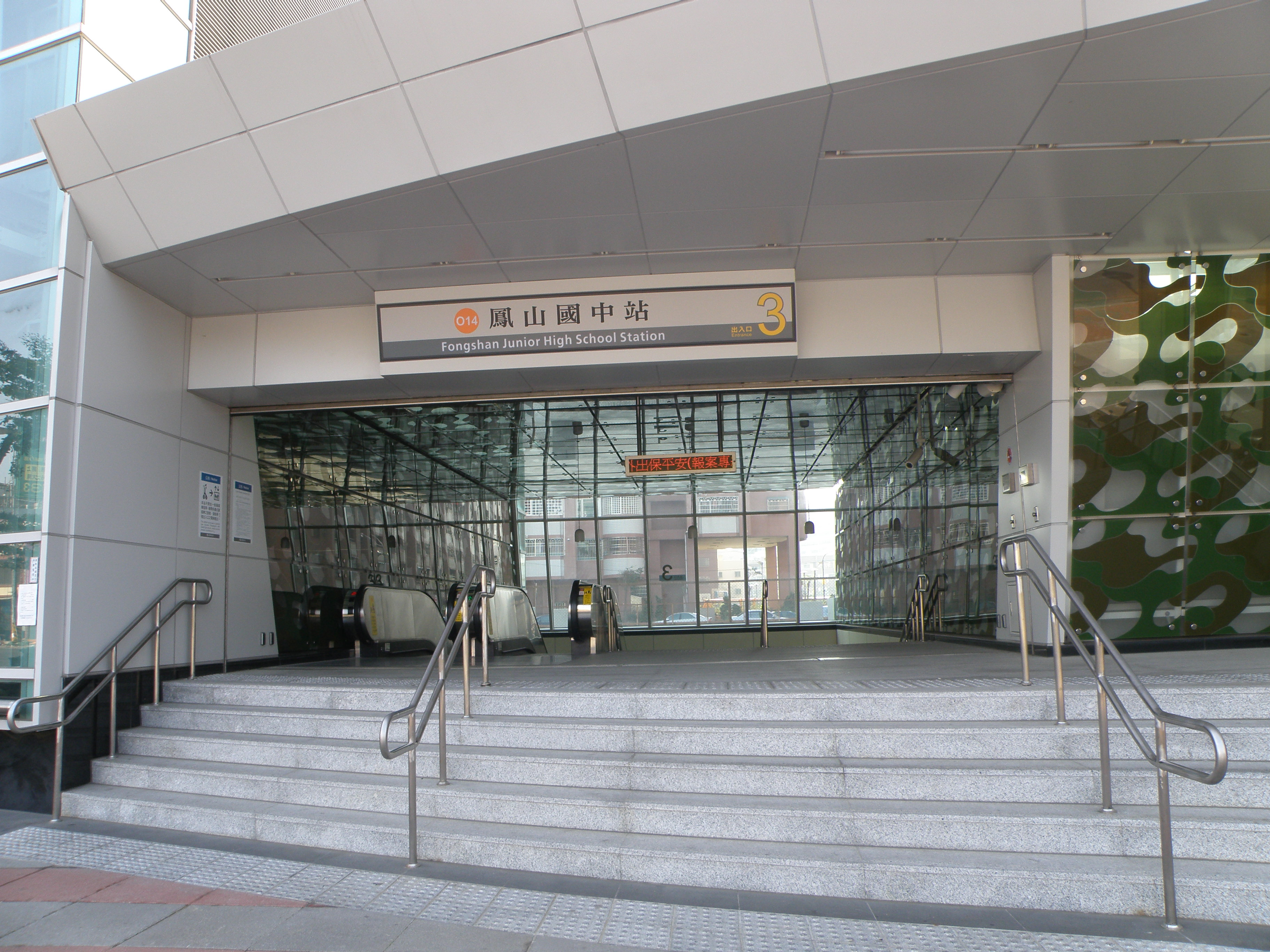
- Fongshan Junior High School station exit 3

General information
- Location: Fongshan, Kaohsiung; Taiwan
- Coordinates: 22°37′30″N 120°22′21″E
- Operated by: Kaohsiung Rapid Transit Corporation
- Line: Orange line (O14)
- Platforms: 1 island platform
- Connections: Bus stop

Construction
- Structure type: Underground
- Accessible: Yes

History
- Opened: 2008-09-14

Passengers
- 2,670 daily (Jan. 2011)

Services
Preceding station	Kaohsiung Metro	Following station
Dadong towards Hamasen	Orange line	Daliao Terminus
Location

Fongshan Junior High School metro station
- Traditional Chinese: 鳳山國中車站
- Simplified Chinese: 凤山国中车站
Transcriptions
Standard Mandarin
- Hanyu Pinyin: Fèngshān Guózhōng Chēzhàn
- Bopomofo: ㄈㄥˋ ㄕㄢ ㄍㄨㄛˊ ㄓㄨㄥ ㄔㄜ ㄓㄢˋ
- Wade–Giles: Fêng^{4}-shan^{1} Kuo^{2}-chung^{1} Ch'ê^{1}-chan^{4}
- Tongyong Pinyin: Fòngshān Guójhōng Chējhàn

Fongshan Junior High School is a station on the Orange line of the Kaohsiung MRT in Fongshan District, Kaohsiung, Taiwan.

== Station overview ==
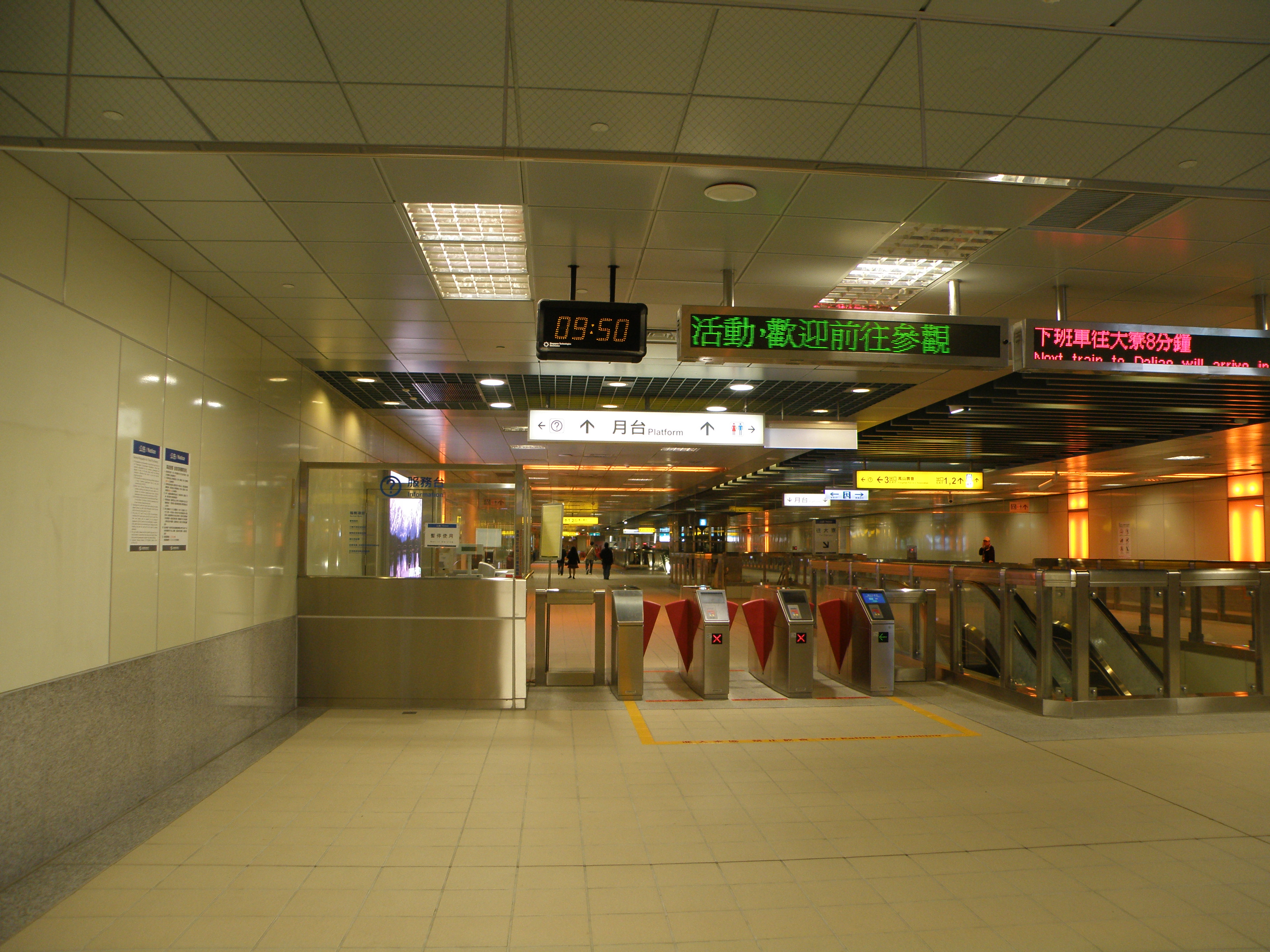
Basement concourse of Fongshan Junior High School station

This is a two-level, underground station with an island platform and three exits. The station is 256 meters long and is located at the intersection of Jhongshan E. Rd. and Ren-ai Rd.

=== Station layout ===
G	Street level	Entrance/exit
B1	Concourse	Lobby, information desk, automatic ticket machines, one-way faregates, restrooms (Near exit 1)
B2	Platform 1	← KMRT Orange line toward Hamasen (Dadong)
B2	Island platform, doors will open on the left
B2	Platform 2	KMRT Orange line toward Daliao (Terminus) →

=== Exits ===
- Exit 1: Fongshan Junior High School
- Exit 2: Fongshan Post Office Ren-ai Market
- Exit 3: Chengde St., Shengli Rd., Jhongjheng Elementary School

== Around the station ==
- Fongshan Junior High School
- Chunghwa Post Fongshan Post Office
- Republic of China Military Academy
- Former Japanese Navy Fongshan Communication Center
- Ruizhu Children's Park
- Huangbu Park
- Hangzhou Park
- Fengshan Ziqiang Park (鳳山自強公園)
