= Kaohsiung Harbor Museum =

Museum in Gushan, Kaohsiung, Taiwan

- 高雄港港史館
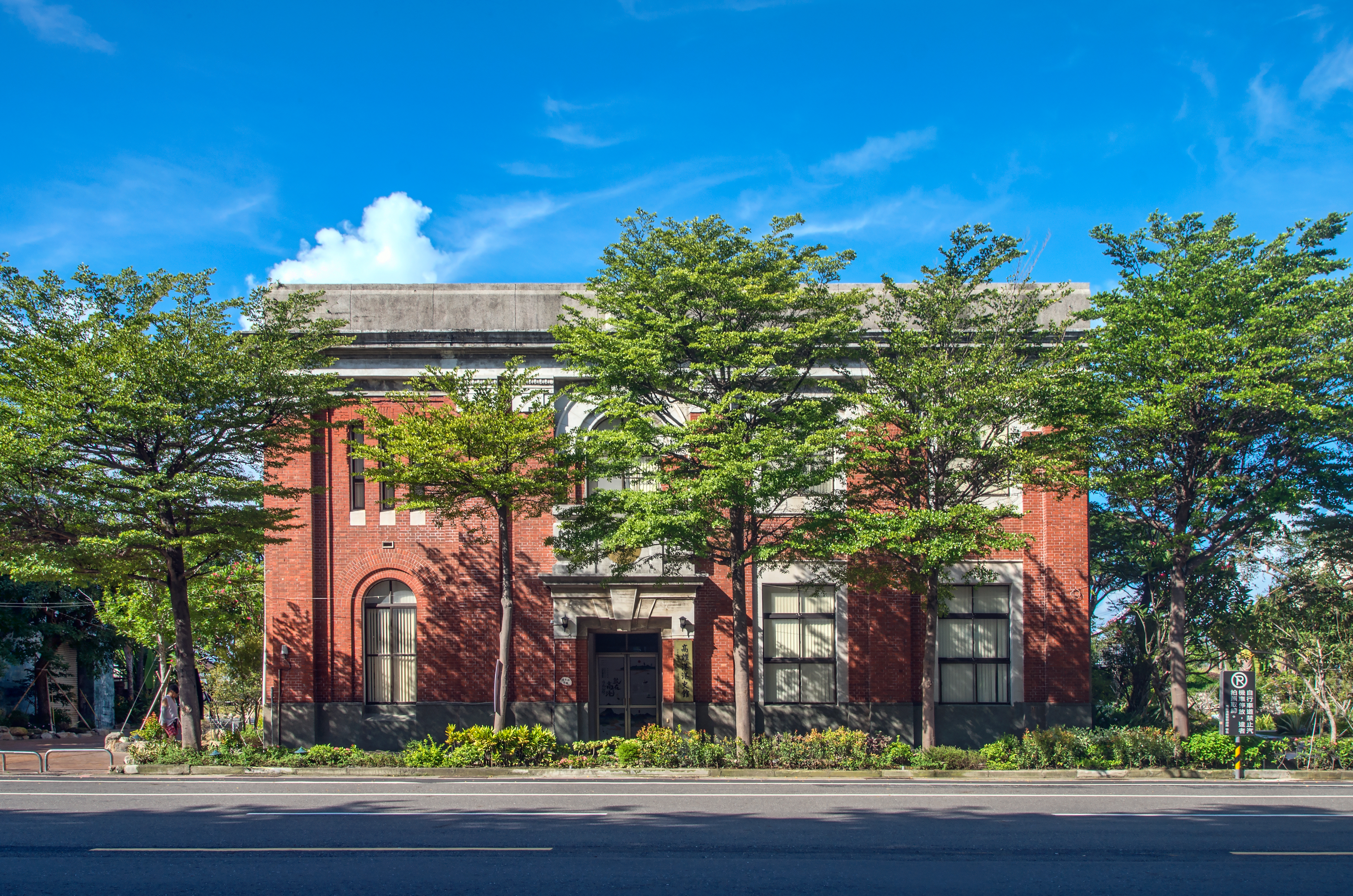
- Former name: Kaohsiung Harbor's Customs and Duties Office; Harbor Affairs Bureau
- Established: 2002
- Location: Gushan, Kaohsiung, Taiwan
- Coordinates: 22°37′05.8″N 120°16′46″E
- Type: museum
- Public transit access: Sizihwan Station

The Kaohsiung Harbor Museum (traditional Chinese: 高雄港港史館; simplified Chinese: 高雄港港史馆; pinyin: Gāoxióng Gǎng Gǎngshǐguǎn) is a museum in Gushan District, Kaohsiung, Taiwan dedicated to the preservation of artifacts on the development of Port of Kaohsiung.

== History ==
The museum building was built in 1916 and completed in 1917 to be used as Kaohsiung Harbor's Customs and Duties Office during the Japanese rule of Taiwan. In 1943, it became the Harbor Affairs Bureau and served as the headquarter of Port of Kaohsiung. It had then been used as the office for government-related agencies throughout the history until 1994 when it became vacant and subject to demolition. However, owing to its historical value, the office was renovated in 1997 and transformed into Kaohsiung Harbor Museum. In 2002, the museum was officially opened to the public in conjunction with the anniversary of Kaohsiung Harbor Bureau.

== Architecture ==
The museum is a two-story building built in classical British brick building. Each of the exterior and interior wall is decorated differently to showcase the rich and diverse architectural elements in a perfect harmony. Despite the renovation, the overall appearance of the building remains almost unchanged.

== Transportation ==
The museum is accessible within walking distance South East from Hamasen Station of Kaohsiung Metro.

== See also ==
- List of museums in Taiwan
