= Kaohsiung Wude Hall =

Museum in Gushan, Kaohsiung, Taiwan

- 高雄市武德殿
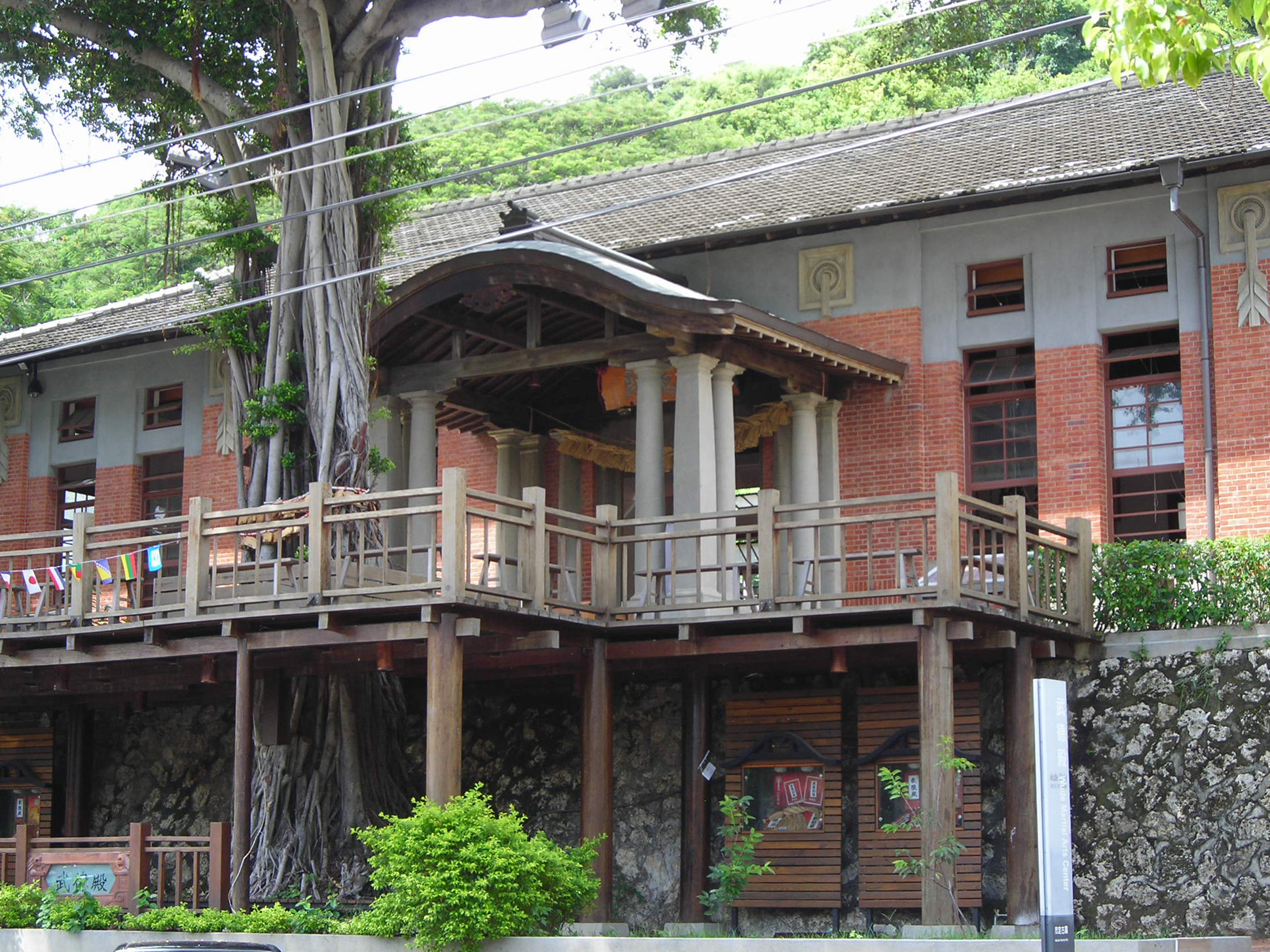
- Interactive map of the Kaohsiung Wude Hall area

General information
- Type: former martial arts hall
- Location: Gushan, Kaohsiung, Taiwan
- Coordinates: 22.62466°N 120.27240°E
- Opened: 1895

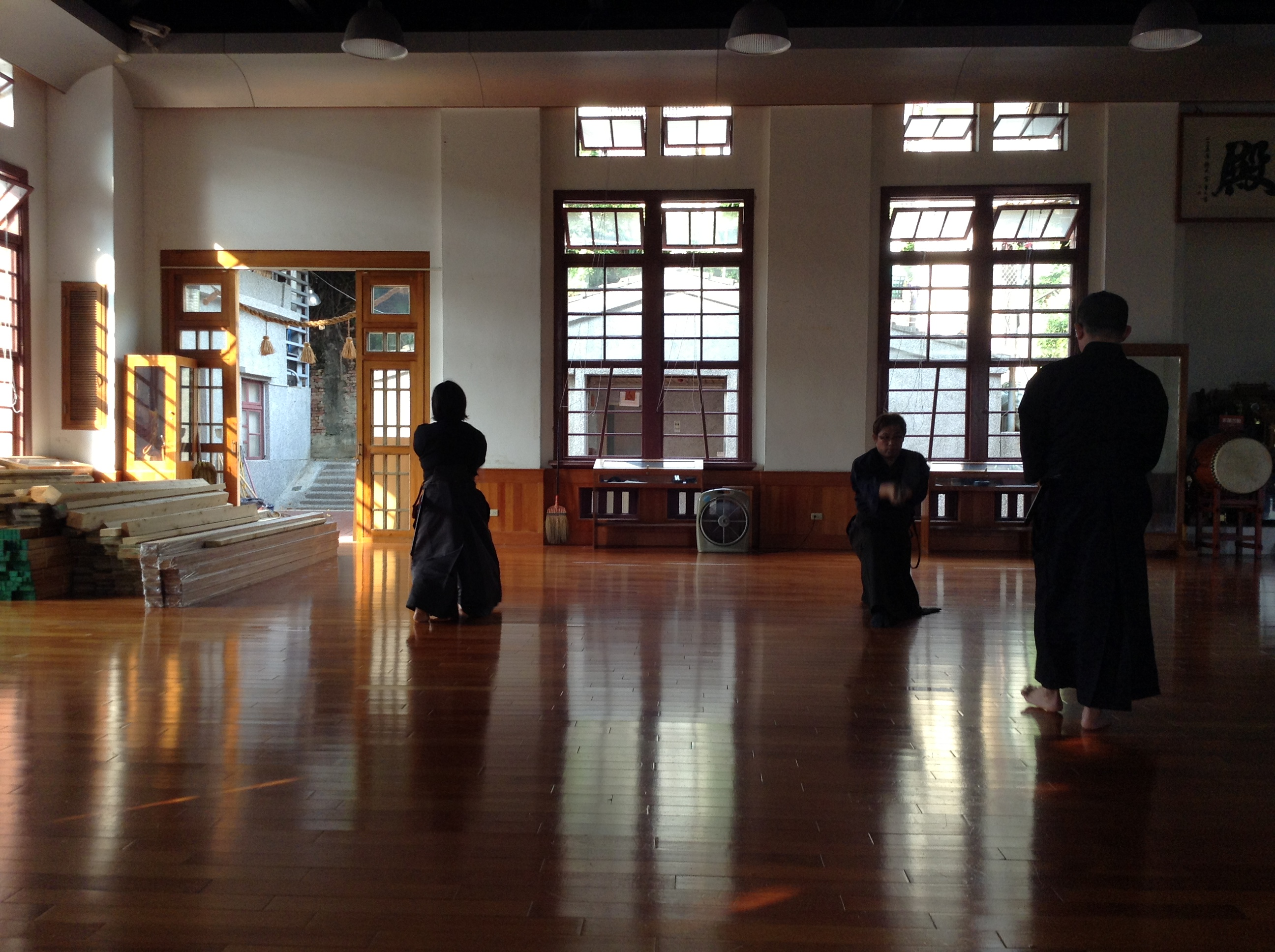
Kaohsiung Wude Hall interior

The Kaohsiung Wude Hall (Chinese: 高雄市武德殿; pinyin: Gāoxióng Shì Wǔdédiàn) is a museum in Gushan District, Kaohsiung, Taiwan.

== History ==
The Dai Nippon Butoku Kai was established in Kyoto, Japan in 1895, and most of its members were police officers. After the Treaty of Shimonoseki with the Qing Dynasty, the Japanese brought their police system with them to Taiwan and Wude culture was introduced and developed by the Japanese police. Wude Martial Arts Centers were built around Taiwan.

The building in Kaohsiung was completed in 1924. After the handover of Taiwan from Japan to the Republic of China in 1945, the building was used and operated by the Kaohsiung Police Department. In 1999, the Civil Affairs Bureau of Kaohsiung City Government designated the building as an ancient monument. When the bureau was established, a restoration project was actively conducted and the restoration was completed within a year in December 2004. In April 2005, the Kaohsiung City Kendo Culture Advocacy Society was commissioned to operate and manage the building. It was the first ancient monument in Taiwan to be revitalized for the original purpose for which it was designed.

== Architecture ==
The building is a magnificent Japanese-designed brick building with a capacity of around 100 people. It has two main parts; on the east is the Kendo practice area and on the west is the Judo practice area.

== Exhibition ==
The hall features a permanent exhibition which includes a board inscribed by calligrapher, Huang Hua-shan, authentic handmade Japanese swords, and wooden bokken and bokuto practice swords. The historical background display features legendary swordsman Miyamoto Musashi, Japanese taiko drums, a kamidana shrine and various pieces of ancient Japanese armor.

== Events ==
The building houses martial arts practice, such as Judo, Kendo or Sumo. There are also activities such as archery.

== Transportation ==
The center is within walking distance north west of Sizihwan Station of the Kaohsiung MRT.

== See also ==
- List of tourist attractions in Taiwan
