= Orange line (Kaohsiung Metro) =

Metro line in Kaohsiung, Taiwan

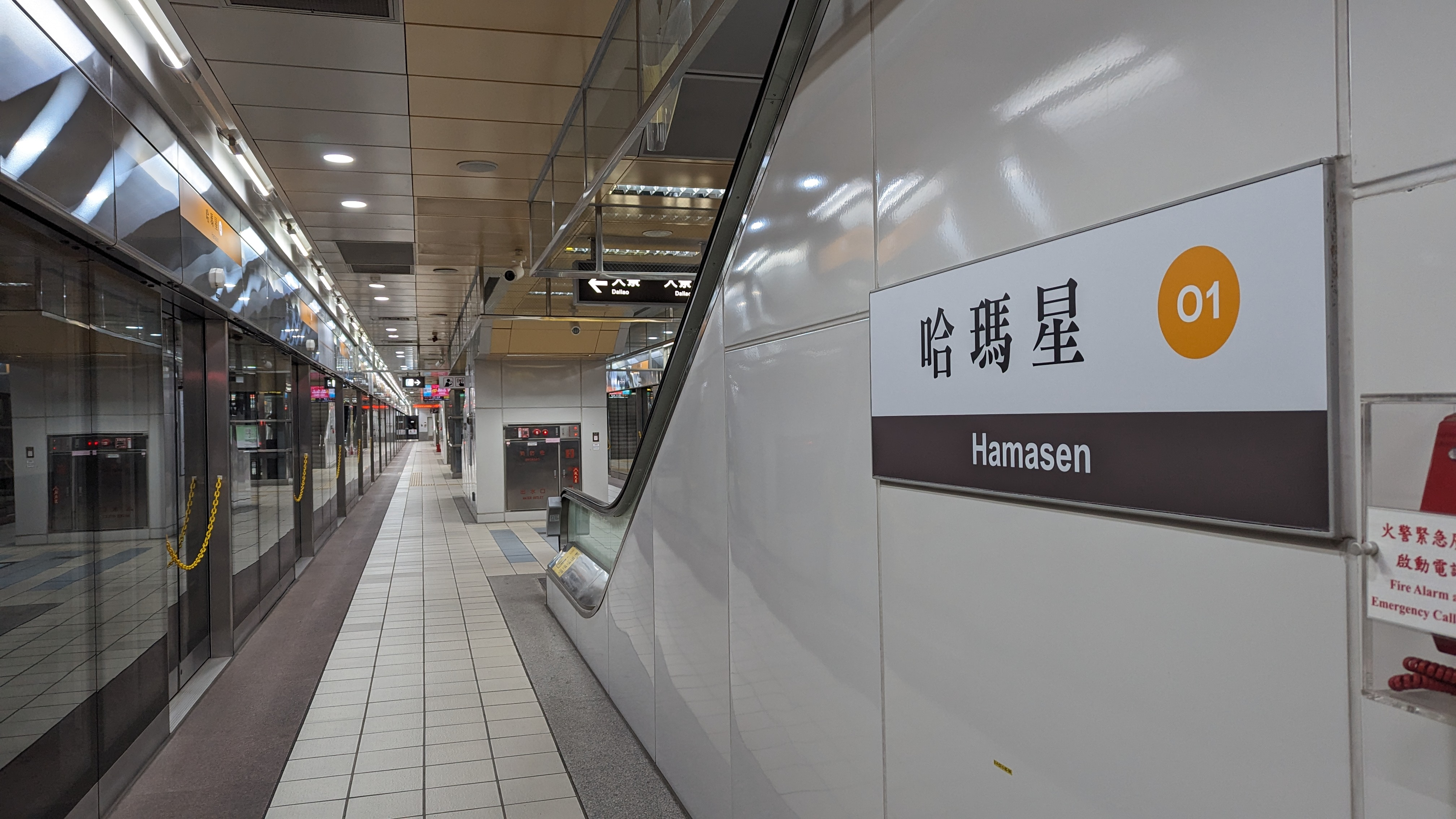
- Platform at Hamasen station

Overview
- Locale: Kaohsiung, Taiwan
- Termini: Hamasen; Daliao
- Stations: 14

Service
- Type: Rapid transit
- System: Kaohsiung Metro
- Depot(s): Daliao

History
- Opened: 14 September 2008; 17 years ago

Technical
- Line length: 14.4 km (8.9 mi)
- Number of tracks: 2
- Character: Underground/at-grade
- Track gauge: 1,435 mm (4 ft 8 1/2 in) standard gauge
- Electrification: 750 V DC third rail

Orange line
- Traditional Chinese: 橘線
- Simplified Chinese: 橘线
Transcriptions
Standard Mandarin
- Hanyu Pinyin: Jú-Xiàn
- Wade–Giles: Chü^{2}- Hsien^{4}
- Tongyong Pinyin: Jyú-Siàn
Southern Min
- Hokkien POJ: Kiat-Soàⁿ

The Orange line is an east-west line of the Kaohsiung Metro in Kaohsiung, Taiwan. It opened on 14 September 2008, the day of Mid-Autumn Festival, for a week-long free trial service. After the free trial service, the Kaohsiung Metro offered a month-long single one-way promotional NT$15 service on both the Red and the Orange line, with regular ticket price after this.

The 14.4 kilometres (8.9 mi) line has 14 stations and is the second metro line to open in southern Taiwan. Shortly prior to opening, flaws such as emergency exit lighted signs, unclear ticket displays, and jammed emergency exits were fixed. Although it was originally supposed to open with the Red line, it was delayed due to a tunnel collapse during construction December 2005.

== Stations ==
Code	Station name		Transfer	Location	
Code	English	Chinese	Transfer	Location	
O1	Hamasen	哈瑪星	via Hamasen	Gushan	Kaohsiung
O2	Yanchengpu	鹽埕埔		Yancheng	Kaohsiung
O4	Cianjin	前金		Cianjin	Kaohsiung
O5	Formosa Boulevard	美麗島	R10	Sinsing	Kaohsiung
O6	Sinyi Elementary School	信義國小		Sinsing	Kaohsiung
O7	Cultural Center	文化中心		Sinsing; Lingya	Kaohsiung
O8	Wukuaicuo	五塊厝	via Kaisyuan Park	Lingya	Kaohsiung
O9	Lingya Sports Park	苓雅運動園區		Lingya	Kaohsiung
O10	Weiwuying	衛武營		Lingya	Kaohsiung
O11	Fongshan West (Kaohsiung City Council)	鳳山西站 (高雄市議會)		Fongshan	Kaohsiung
O12	Fongshan	鳳山		Fongshan	Kaohsiung
O13	Dadong	大東		Fongshan	Kaohsiung
O14	Fongshan Junior High School	鳳山國中		Fongshan	Kaohsiung
OT1	Daliao (Cianjhuang)	大寮 (前庄)		Daliao	Kaohsiung
