= Kaohsiung MRT foreign workers scandal =

Scandal in Kaohsiung, Taiwan

Kaohsiung Mass Rapid Transit Foreign Workers Scandal, also known as the KMRT Scandal, is a scandal that broke in August 2005 in Taiwan, during the presidency of Chen Shui-bian. During the construction of the Kaohsiung Mass Rapid Transit, Thai workers hired for the job rioted to protest bad working conditions. During the subsequent investigation, it was found that foreign workers had been hired through a third party, despite project requirements mandating that workers be vetted directly by the government.
