= Daliao metro station =

Metro station in Daliao, Kaohsiung, Taiwan

Daliao OT1 大寮
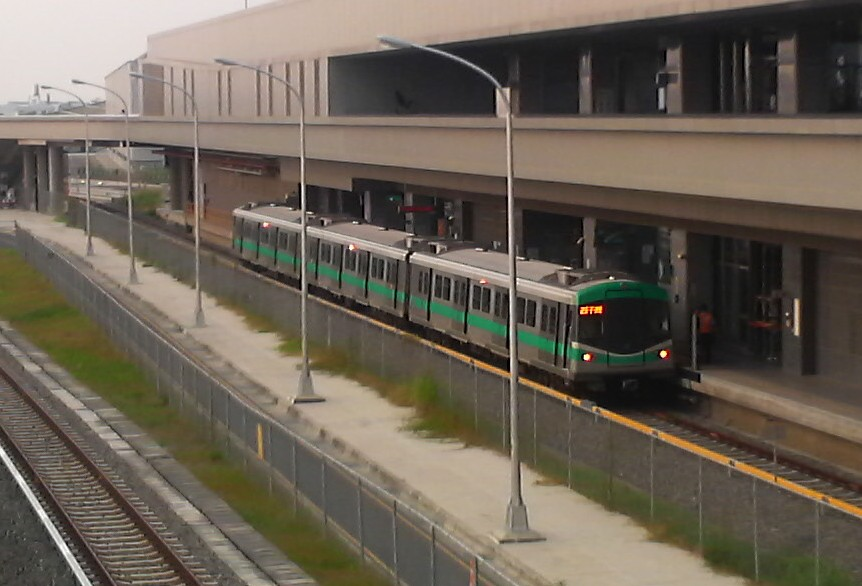
- Daliao station

Chinese name
- Traditional Chinese: 大寮車站
- Simplified Chinese: 大寮车站
Transcriptions
Standard Mandarin
- Hanyu Pinyin: Dàliaó Chēzhàn
- Bopomofo: ㄉㄚˋ ㄌㄧㄠˊ ㄔㄜ ㄓㄢˋ
- Wade–Giles: Ta^{4}-liao^{2} Ch'ê^{1}-chan^{4}
- Tongyong Pinyin: Dàliaó Chējhàn

General information
- Other names: Cianjhuang; 前庄
- Location: Daliao, Kaohsiung; Taiwan
- Coordinates: 22°37′13″N 120°23′31″E
- Operated by: Kaohsiung Rapid Transit Corporation
- Line: Orange line (OT1)
- Platforms: One island platform

Construction
- Structure type: At-grade

History
- Opened: 2008-09-14

Passengers
- 4,727 daily (Jan. 2011)

Services
Preceding station	Kaohsiung Metro	Following station
Fongshan Junior High School towards Hamasen	Orange line	Terminus
Location

Daliao is a terminus of the Orange line of Kaohsiung Metro in Daliao District, Kaohsiung, Taiwan.

== Station overview ==
This is an at-grade, two-level station with an island platform and two exits. It is 148 meters long and is designed to handle 8,299 people/hour (2,915 people on the platform). There is a taxi stand by exit 1.

== Station layout ==
2F	Concourse	Lobby, information desk, automatic ticket dispensing machines, one-way faregates, restrooms, toward entrance/exit
Ground level	Platform 1	← KMRT Orange line toward Hamasen (Fongshan Junior High School)
Ground level	Island platform, doors will open on the left for platform 2, right for platform 1
Ground level	Platform 2	← KMRT Orange line toward Hamasen (Fongshan Junior High School)

=== Exits ===
- Exit 1: Zhongxing Village (west side of station)
- Exit 2: Qianzhuang Village (east side of station)

== Around the station ==
- Fooyin University
