= Hamasen station =

Metro and light rail station in Kaohsiung, Taiwan

Coordinates: 22.6216°N 120.2758°E

Hamasen O1/C14 哈瑪星站
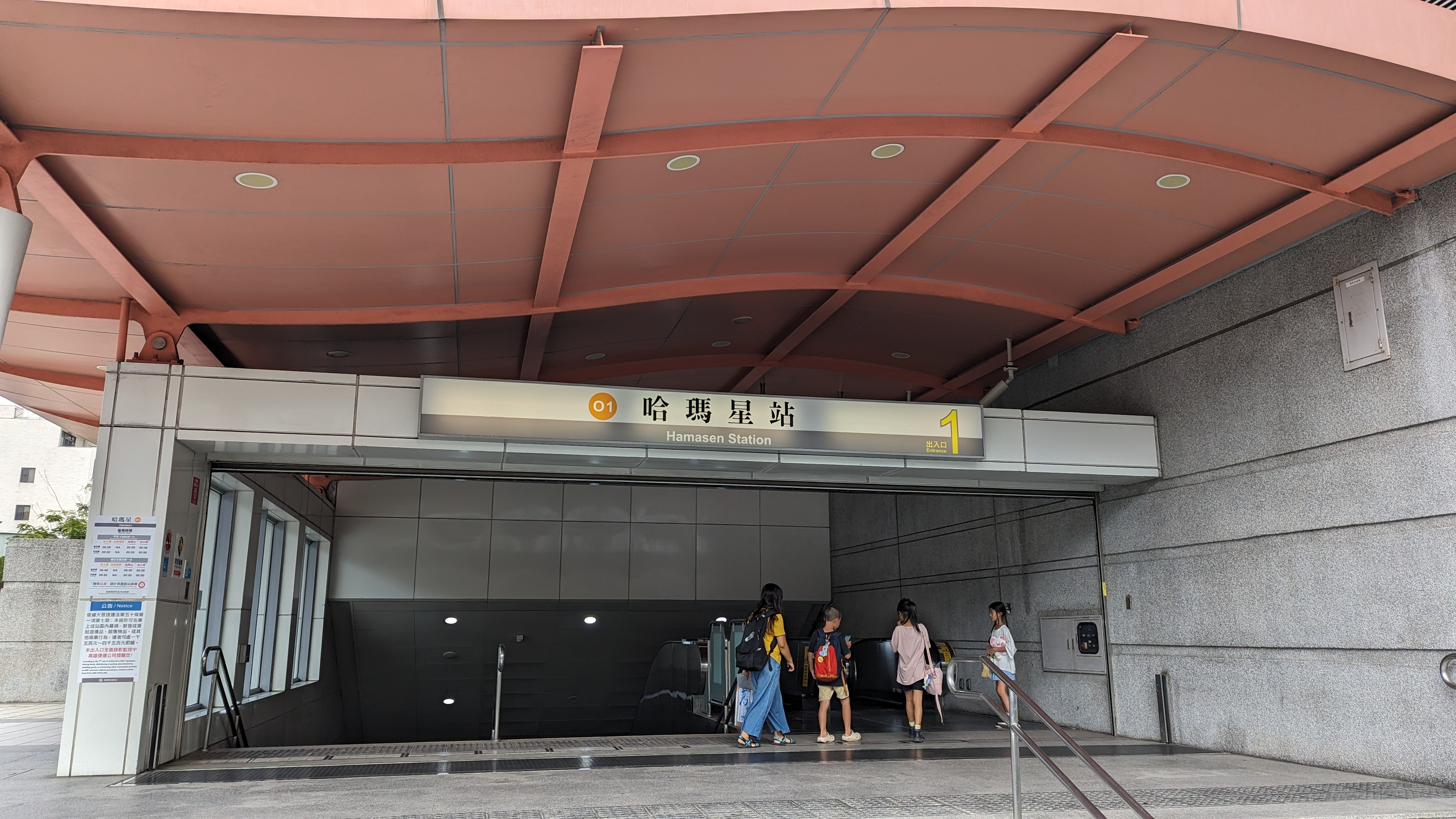
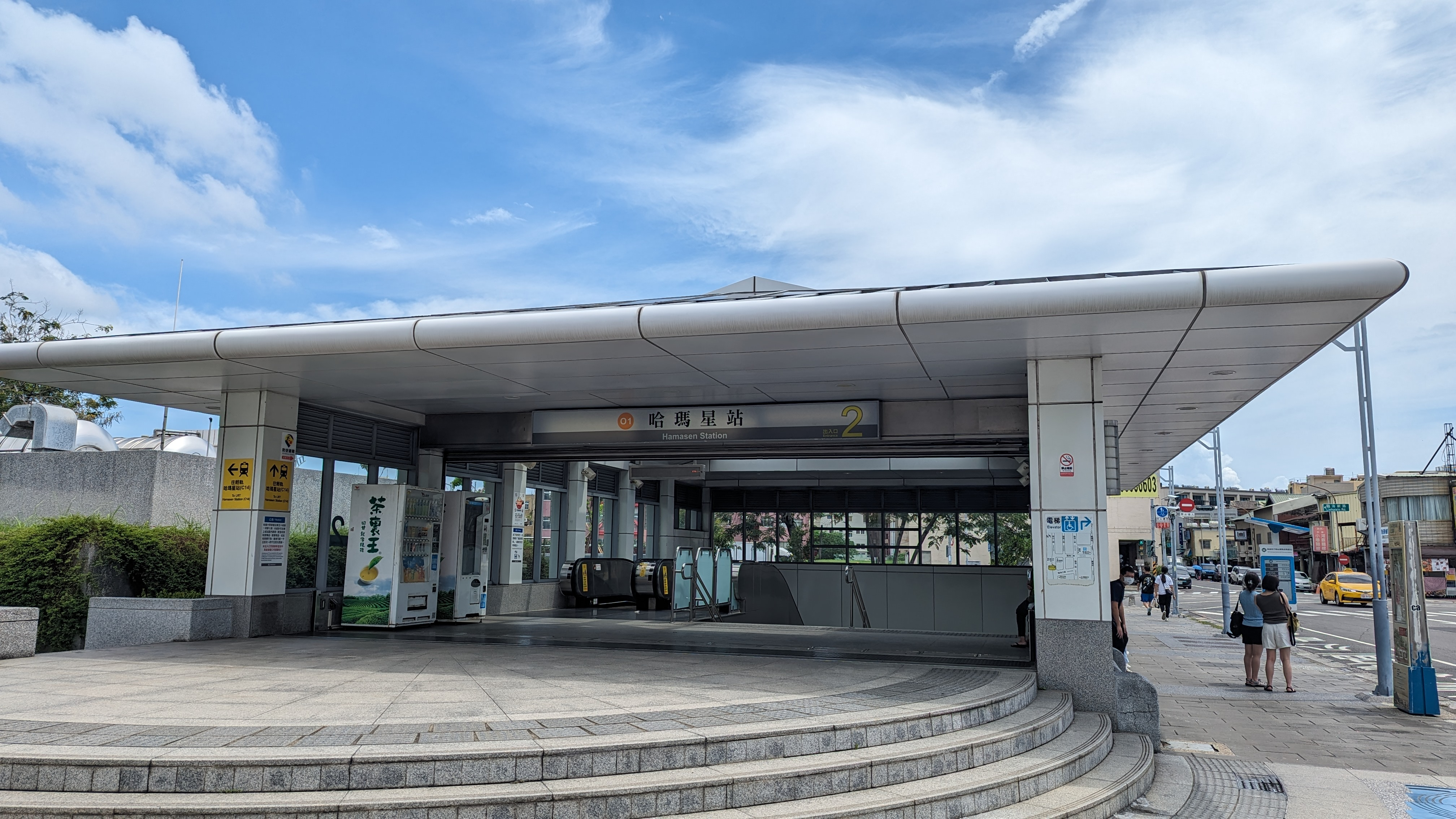
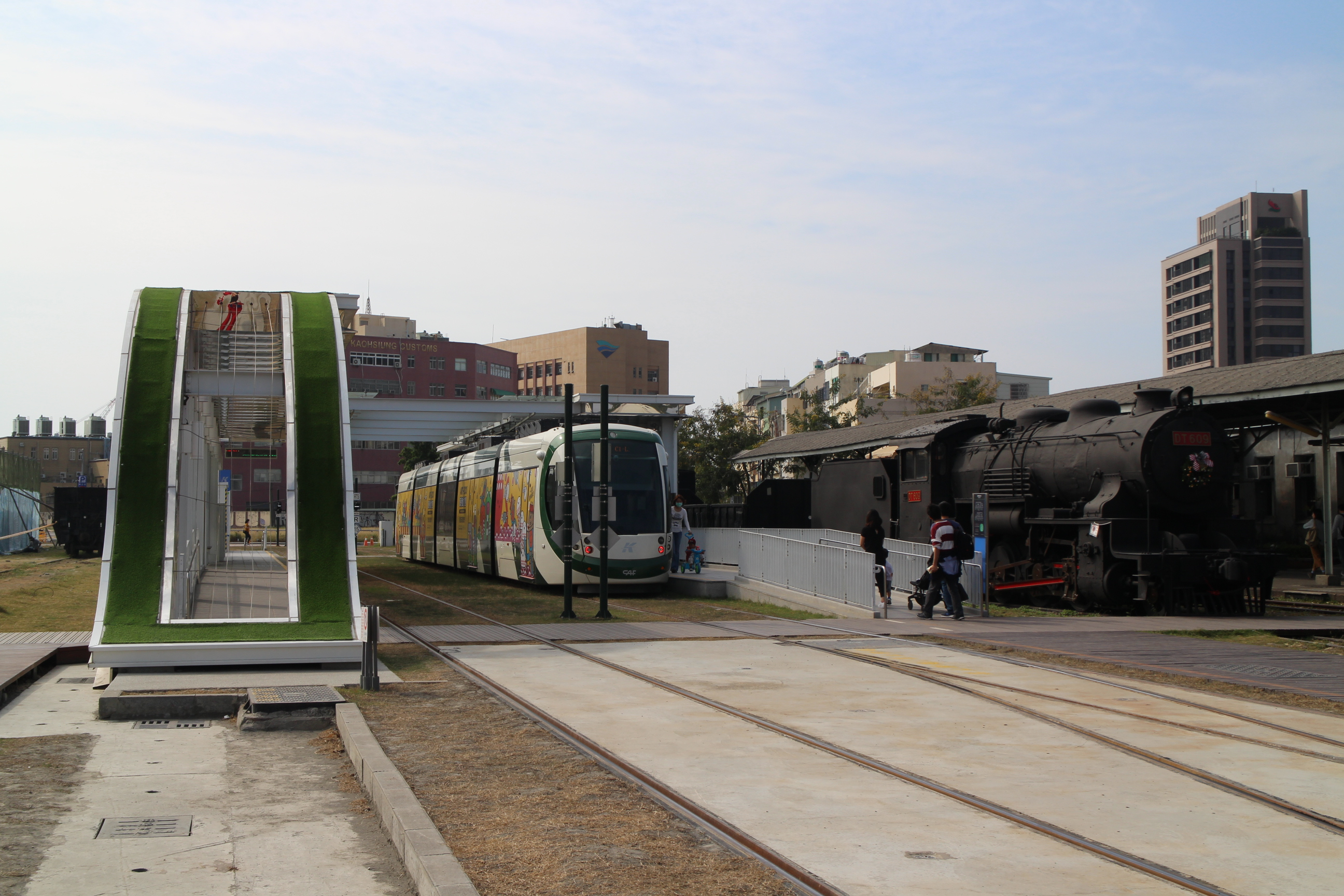
- Hamasen metro station (exit 1) Hamasen metro station (exit 2) Hamasen light rail station

General information
- Location: Gushan, Kaohsiung; Taiwan
- Operated by: Kaohsiung Rapid Transit Corporation
- Lines: Orange line; Circular light rail
- Platforms: 1 island platform, 2 side platforms
- Connections: Bus stop

Construction
- Structure type: Underground, ground level
- Accessible: Yes

Other information
- Station code: O1, C14

History
- Opened: 14 September 2008 (metro); 16 October 2015 (light rail)

Services
Preceding station	Kaohsiung Metro	Following station
Terminus	Orange line	Yanchengpu towards Daliao
Preceding station	Kaohsiung Metro	Following station
Penglai Pier-2 outer loop / anticlockwise	Circular light rail	Shoushan Park inner loop / clockwise
Location

Hamasen (Chinese: 哈瑪星站; pinyin: Hāmǎxīng Zhàn) is a metro station and light rail station of Kaohsiung Rapid Transit, served by the Orange line and the Circular light rail. It is located in Gushan District, Kaohsiung, Taiwan.

The station name is derived from Hamasen, the historic name of the area.

== Station overview ==
Formerly called Sizihwan station after a nearby scenic area Sizihwan, the metro station was renamed in 2024. It was originally planned to be constructed inside the National Sun Yat-sen University. Due to construction issues and oppositions from the university, it was eventually built at the current location instead.

The nearby Taiwan Railway Kaohsiung Port Station, which opened in 1908 to provide train service in the Kaohsiung Harbor area, ceased operations and was turned into a railway cultural park after service began on the Orange Line.

The metro station is a two-level, underground station with an island platform. It is located at the junction of Linhai 2nd Road and Gushan 1st Road and has two exits. The station is 282 metres (925 ft) long.

The light rail station is a ground level station with two side platforms. It is located inside Hamasen Railway Cultural Park.

== Station layout ==
Street level
Entrance/exit
Exit 1: Gushan Ferry Station, Gushan Post Office

Exit 2: Kaohsiung Customs, Kaohsiung Fisherman's Wharf

B1
Concourse
Lobby, information desk, automatic ticket machines, one-way faregates
Restrooms (near exit 2)
B2
Platform 1
→ KMRT Orange Line toward Daliao (Yanchengpu) →
Island platform, doors will open on the left for platform 1, right for platform 2
Platform 2
→ KMRT Orange Line toward Daliao (Yanchengpu) →

Street level	Side platform
Street level	→ Circular light rail toward Lizihnei (Penglai Pier-2)
Street level	→ Circular light rail toward Lizihnei (Penglai Pier-2)
Street level	Side platform

== Around the station ==
- Da'an Park
- Former British Consulate at Takao
- Gushan Triangle Park
- International Cruise Terminal
- Kaohsiung Fisherman's Wharf
- Kaohsiung Harbor Museum
- Kaohsiung Martyrs' Shrine
- Kaohsiung Wude Hall
- Mount Shou
- National Sun Yat-sen University
- Sizhiwan Beach
- Sizihwan Scenic Area
- Sizihwan Tunnel (Old Shoushan Cave)
- Sky Balcony
- Takao Railway Museum and Hamasen Railway Cultural Park
