= Kaohsiung Metro =

Transit system in Kaohsiung, Taiwan

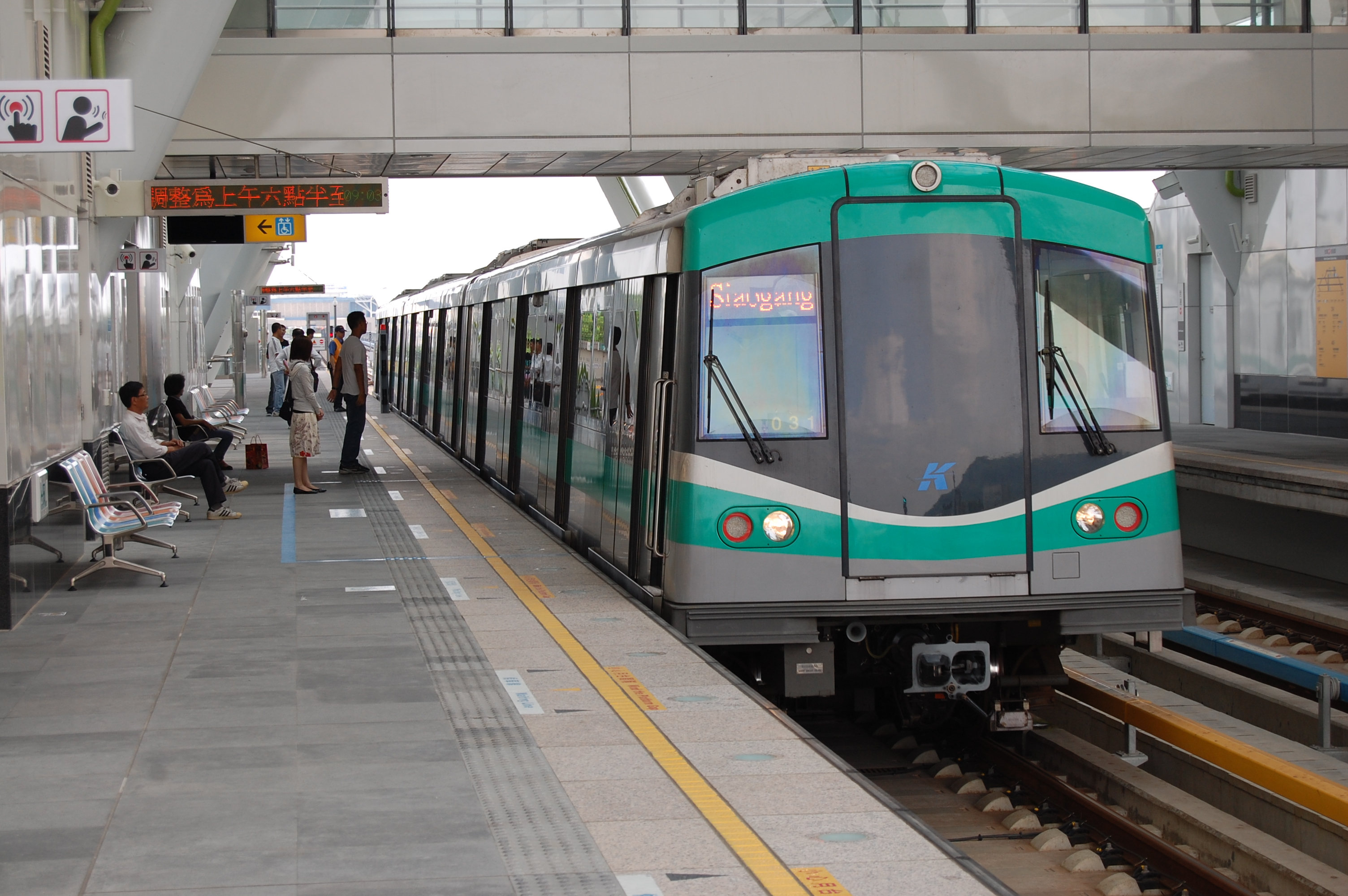

Overview
- Native name: 高雄捷運
- Owner: Kaohsiung City Government (Note: The MRT is under a BOT contract until 2037 where Kaohsiung Rapid Transit Corporation is the concessionaire.)
- Locale: Kaohsiung, Taiwan
- Transit type: Rapid transit, light rail
- Number of lines: 3
- Number of stations: 76
- Daily ridership: Red line 142,523; Orange line 43,781; Circular light rail 33,608; (Aug 2025)
- Annual ridership: 65.44 million (2024)
- Website: www.krtc.com.tw/eng/

Operation
- Began operation: 9 March 2008; 18 years ago
- Operator: Kaohsiung Rapid Transit Corporation

Technical
- System length: 64.8 km (40.3 mi))
- Track gauge: 1,435 mm (4 ft 8 1/2 in) standard gauge
- Electrification: 750 V DC third rail (MRT)

Kaohsiung Metro
- Traditional Chinese: 高雄捷運
- Simplified Chinese: 高雄捷运
Transcriptions
Standard Mandarin
- Hanyu Pinyin: Gāoxióng Jiéyùn
- Wade–Giles: Kao^{1}-hsiung^{2} Chieh^{2}-yün^{4}
- Tongyong Pinyin: Gaosyóng Jiéyùn
Southern Min
- Hokkien POJ: Ko-hiông Chia̍t-ūn

Kaohsiung Rapid Transit System
- Traditional Chinese: 高雄都會區大眾捷運系統
- Simplified Chinese: 高雄都会区大众捷运系统
Transcriptions
Standard Mandarin
- Hanyu Pinyin: Gāoxióng Dūhuìqū Dàzhòng Jiéyùn Xìtǒng
- Wade–Giles: Kao^{1}-hsiung^{2} Tu^{1}-hui^{4}-ch'ü^{1} Ta^{4}-chung^{4} Chieh^{2}-yün^{4} Hsi^{4}-t'ung^{3}
- Tongyong Pinyin: Gaosyóng Duhuèicyu Dàjhòng Jiéyùn Sìtǒng
Southern Min
- Hokkien POJ: Ko-hiông To·-hōe-khu Toā-chiòng Chia̍t-ūn Hē-thóng

Kaohsiung Metro (Chinese: 高雄大眾捷運系統, 高雄捷運) is a rapid transit and light rail system covering the metropolitan area of Kaohsiung, Taiwan. Its rapid transit network is known as Kaohsiung Mass Rapid Transit (MRT) System or Kaohsiung Rapid Transit (KRT). Construction of the MRT started in October 2001. The MRT opened in 2008 and the Circular light rail in 2015. Kaohsiung Metro is operated by the Kaohsiung Rapid Transit Corporation (KRTC; Chinese: 高雄捷運公司) under a BOT contract the company signed with the Kaohsiung City Government.

The system uses romanizations derived from Tongyong Pinyin.

== History ==
The Kaohsiung City Government undertook a feasibility study for constructing a rapid transit system in Kaohsiung in 1987. After finding favorable results, the city government began lobbying the Central Government for approval and funding. In 1990, approval was obtained to establish the Kaohsiung City Mass Rapid Transit Bureau and planning of the rapid transit network started. The first phase of the Kaohsiung Mass Rapid Transit System, the Red and Orange lines, was approved in 1991, but disputes in funding shares between Kaohsiung City and County Governments stalled the project. The Kaohsiung City Mass Rapid Transit Bureau was officially established in 1994, to coincide with the project's move into the final scoping and detail design stages.

Work continued until 1996, when the Central Government ordered KMRT to look into constructing the project via the Build–operate–transfer (BOT) method. In 1999, the city government put out a request for the BOT contract to construct the first phase of the KMRT system. In 2000, out of the three consortia that submitted bids, Kaohsiung Rapid Transit Corporation (KRTC) was awarded the contract, receiving priority negotiating rights with the city government in constructing the system. KRTC obtained a company license and was registered in December 2000. In January 2001, KRTC signed the Construction and Operation Agreement and the Development Agreement with the Kaohsiung City Government, signaling the beginning of construction of the KMRT system. The main participants of the KRTC are China Steel Corporation, Southeast Cement Corporation, RSEA Engineering Corporation, China Development Industrial Bank, and Industrial Bank of Taiwan. The current system cost NT$181.3 (US$5.46 billion) to construct and includes a contract for 30 years of operation and maintenance. Construction costs were shared between the central government (79%), Kaohsiung City Government (19%), and Kaohsiung County Government (2%).

Construction began in October 2001, with 66 shield tunnels (45.3 km (28.1 mi)) completed in May 2006. The cut-and-cover and bored tunnel methods were used for construction of the lines. In November 2006, the first trial runs began on the Red line. In January 2007, the last concrete slabs were laid for the 37 planned stations.

=== Scandals and major construction accidents ===
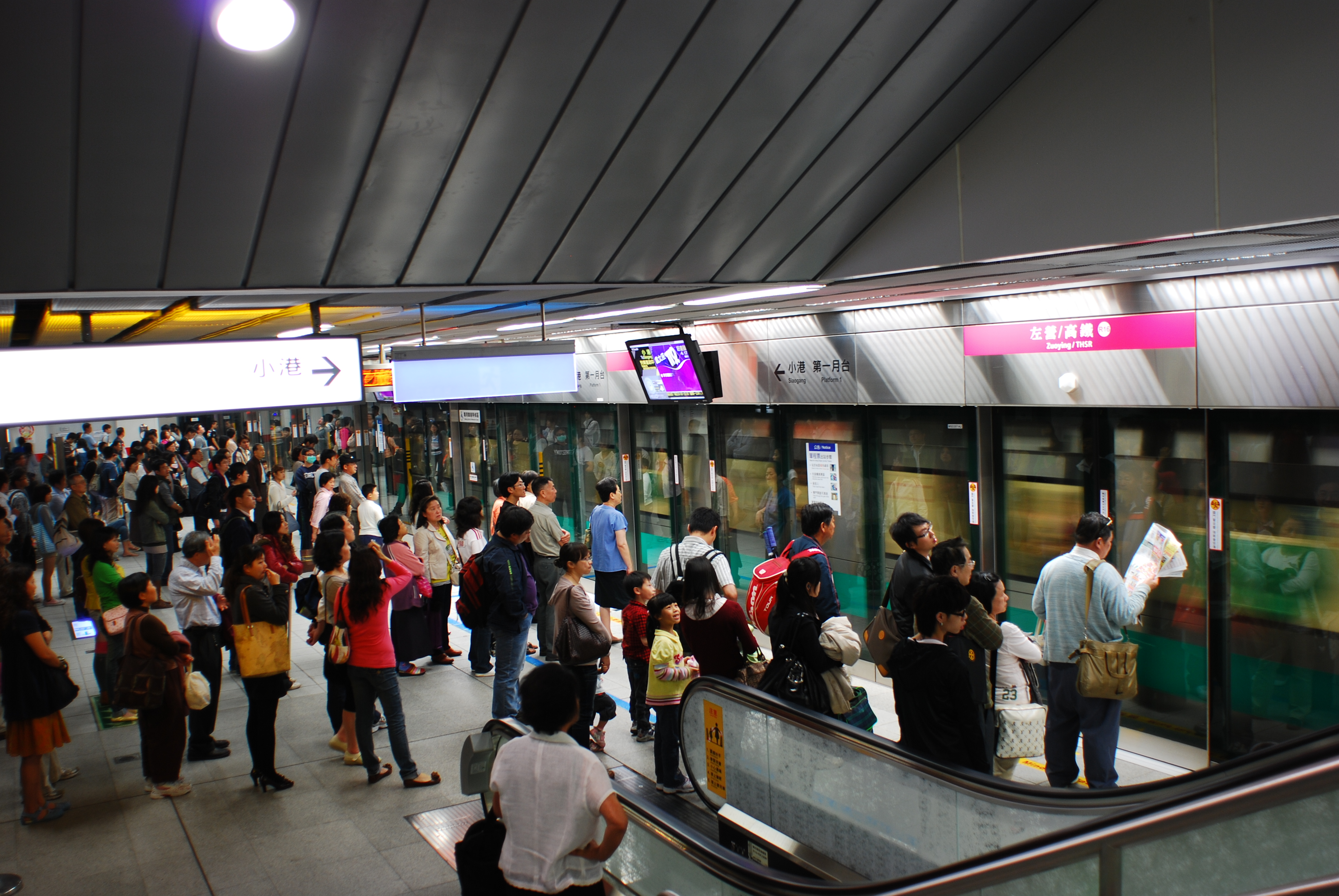
Passengers lining up to board at Zuoying station

In August 2004, a section of subway tunnel near Sizihwan metro station at the west end of the Orange line collapsed during construction due to loose sand underground and water break-ins. Four low-rise buildings near the collapsed tunnel had to be evacuated, and later had to be torn down due to major structural damage.

The Kaohsiung MRT Foreign Workers Scandal, involving alleged inhumane treatment of Thai migrant workers, erupted in 2005. Investigation revealed kickbacks to politicians by the contractor. The scandal had tainted the public confidence in the construction of the system and prompted a diplomatic response by the Thai prime minister asking the migrant workers to return to Thailand. Chen Chu, the Chairperson of the Council of Labor Affairs of the Executive Yuan, resigned as a result of the scandal.

In December 2005, another subway tunnel section of the Orange line at eastern Kaohsiung collapsed during construction. The collapse of the subway tunnel also brought about the collapse of a road tunnel above the subway tunnel. Several nearby buildings were evacuated for several days for inspection. It was estimated that the road tunnel could not be rebuilt and reopened for traffic for at least a few months. As of January 2008, the section was still closed and traffic was diverted around the affected area.

=== Opening ===
Construction accidents delayed the opening of the MRT considerably from the originally planned December 2006 date. The Sanduo-Siaogang section of the Red line was eventually opened to the public for free test rides during 8–11 February 2008, and the Red line (except for two stations) opened for service on 9 March 2008. The Orange line fully opened for service on 14 September 2008.

=== Unopened stations ===
The R1, R2, and O3 stations were planned originally but never built. The R1 and R2 stations were cancelled before construction, and O3 was cancelled due to a fire at the original station location.

== Routes ==
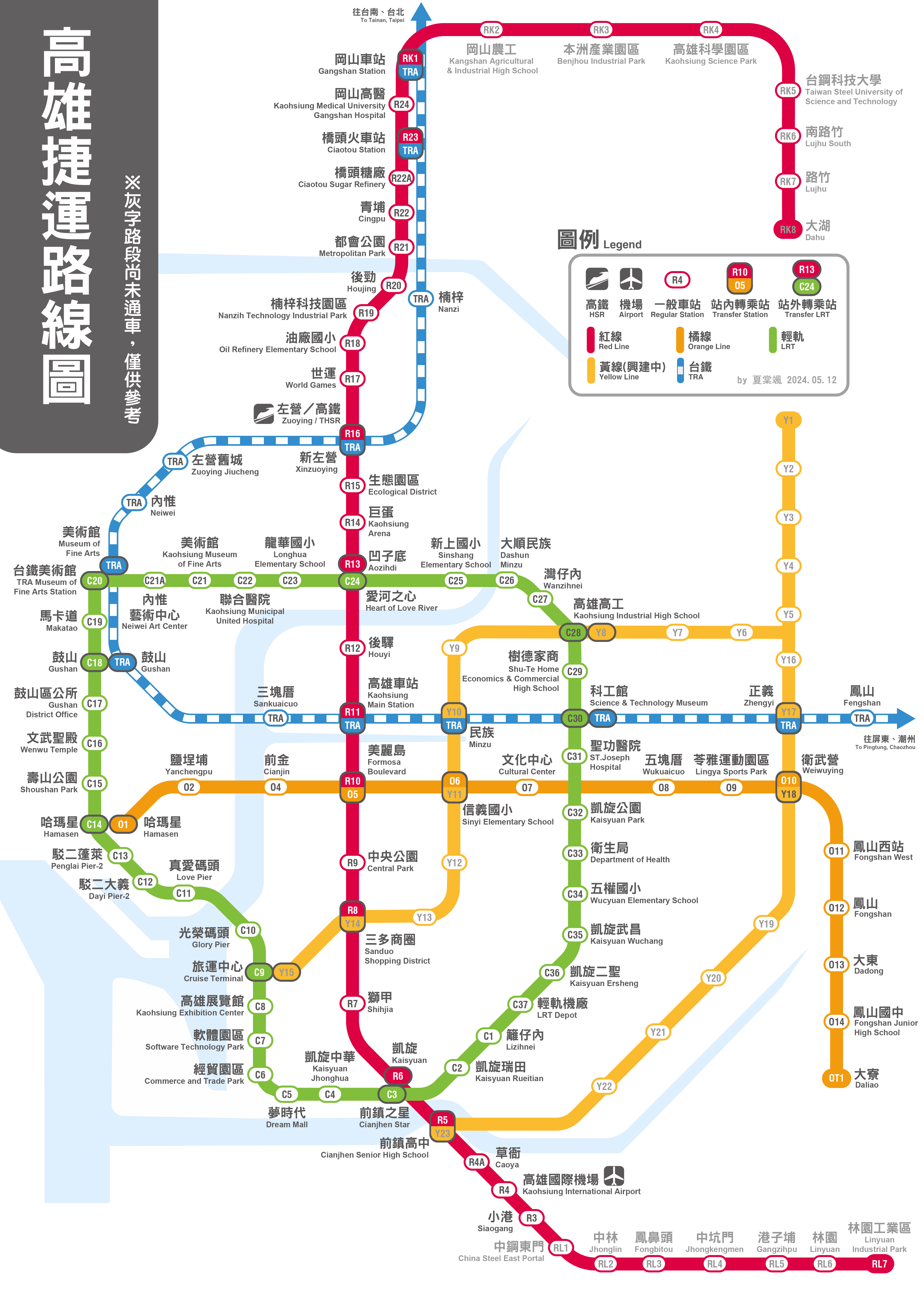

The Kaohsiung Metro is made up of the Red line and Orange line with 38 stations covering a distance of 42.7 km (26.5 mi). Twenty-seven of these stations are underground, with nine elevated and two at-grade level. All underground stations have full height platform screen doors.

The light rail transit (LRT) system consists of the Circular line with 38 stations .

- Kaohsiung Metro route table:
  - In operation: Main lines: 3, extensions: 0
  - Planned: Main lines: 9, extensions: 6
  - Total routes: Main lines: 11, extension: 6
  - Terminated: Main line: 1, extensions: 1

Line	Termini (district)		Stations	Length km	Opened	Depot
Red line	Gangshan (Gangshan)	Siaogang (Siaogang)	25	28.3	2008	North; South
Orange line	Hamasen (Gushan)	Daliao (Daliao)	14	14.4	2008	Daliao
Circular light rail	Lizihnei (Cianjhen)	Lizihnei (Cianjhen)	38	22.1	2015	Cianjhen

=== Red line ===
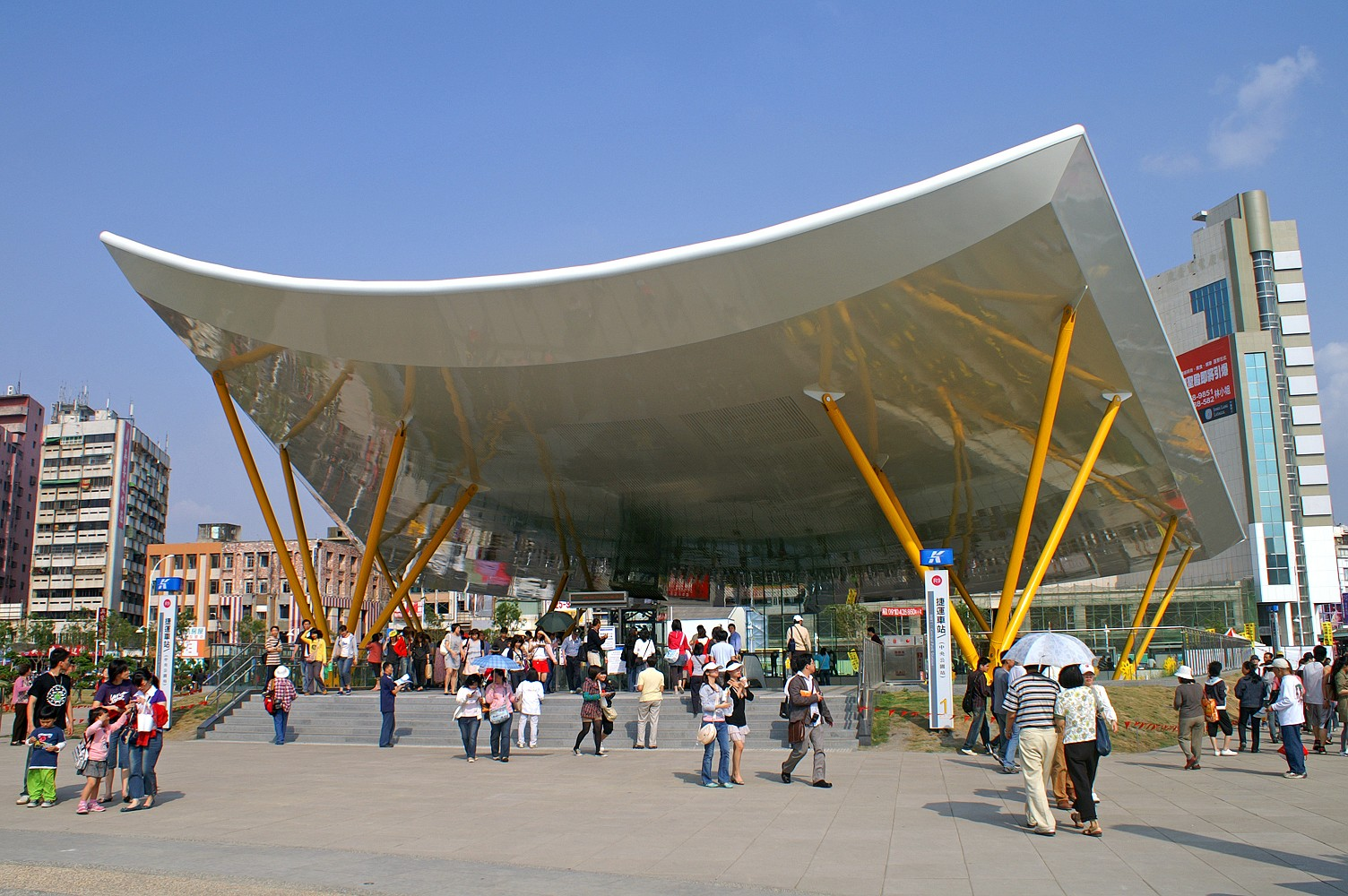
Central Park station

From the intersection of Yanhai and Hanmin Roads in the Siaogang District in the South, the Red line travels northwards, following Jhongshan Road as it passes by Kaohsiung International Airport, Labour Park, Sanduo Shopping District, Central Park, and the Dagangpu circle to Kaohsiung Main Station. After crossing the track yard of TRA, the route then follows Bo'ai Road arriving at Zuoying. Then the route passes through Banpingshan, extends along Zuonan Road to Nanzih Export Processing Zone, and continues into parts of the city formerly part of Kaohsiung County. The route finally passes along the Gaonan Highway to Ciaotou District and the southern border area of Gangshan District. The total length of the Red line is approximately 28.3 kilometres (17.6 mi), with 24 stations on the route, of which 15 are underground, eight elevated and one at ground level. Two depots serve the line near Caoya and Kaohsiung Medical University Gangshan Hospital. The Red line (excluding Kaohsiung Medical University Gangshan Hospital metro station) commenced passenger service on 9 March 2008. Gangshan South station was opened for passenger service on 23 December 2012, followed by Gangshan on 30 June 2024.

=== Orange line ===
From the west, the Orange line starts at Sizihwan (Linhai 2nd Road), crosses the track yard of TRA Kaohsiung Port Station and follows Dayong Road, passing through Love River. The route then follows Jhongjheng Road as it passes by Kaohsiung City Council, Dagangpu Circle, Cultural Center, Martial Arts Stadium, and the Weiwuying Park planning site before entering parts of the city formerly part of Kaohsiung County. The route continues along Zihyou Road, Guangyuan Road and Jhongshan East Road in Fengshan District to Daliao District. The total length of the line is approximately 14.4 kilometres (8.9 mi), with 14 stations on the route. All stations are underground except Daliao Station, which is at ground level. A single depot has been built beside Daliao station to serve the line. The Orange line commenced passenger service on 14 September 2008.

=== Circular light rail ===
The Circular LRT line (aka Kaohsiung LRT, Kaohsiung Tram) for Kaohsiung is a light rail line. Construction of Phase I, C1 Kaisyuan to C14 Sizhihwan began in June 2013. Phase I had operations in September 2017. Phase II was inaugurated on 1 January 2024, turning the light rail line into a loop line.

A temporary light rail system for demonstration purposes, with just two stations, was built in the Central Park in 2004, using Melbourne D2 Tram cars from Siemens. As it was simply for demonstration purposes, it was closed soon after, and is no longer operational.

== Expansion projects ==
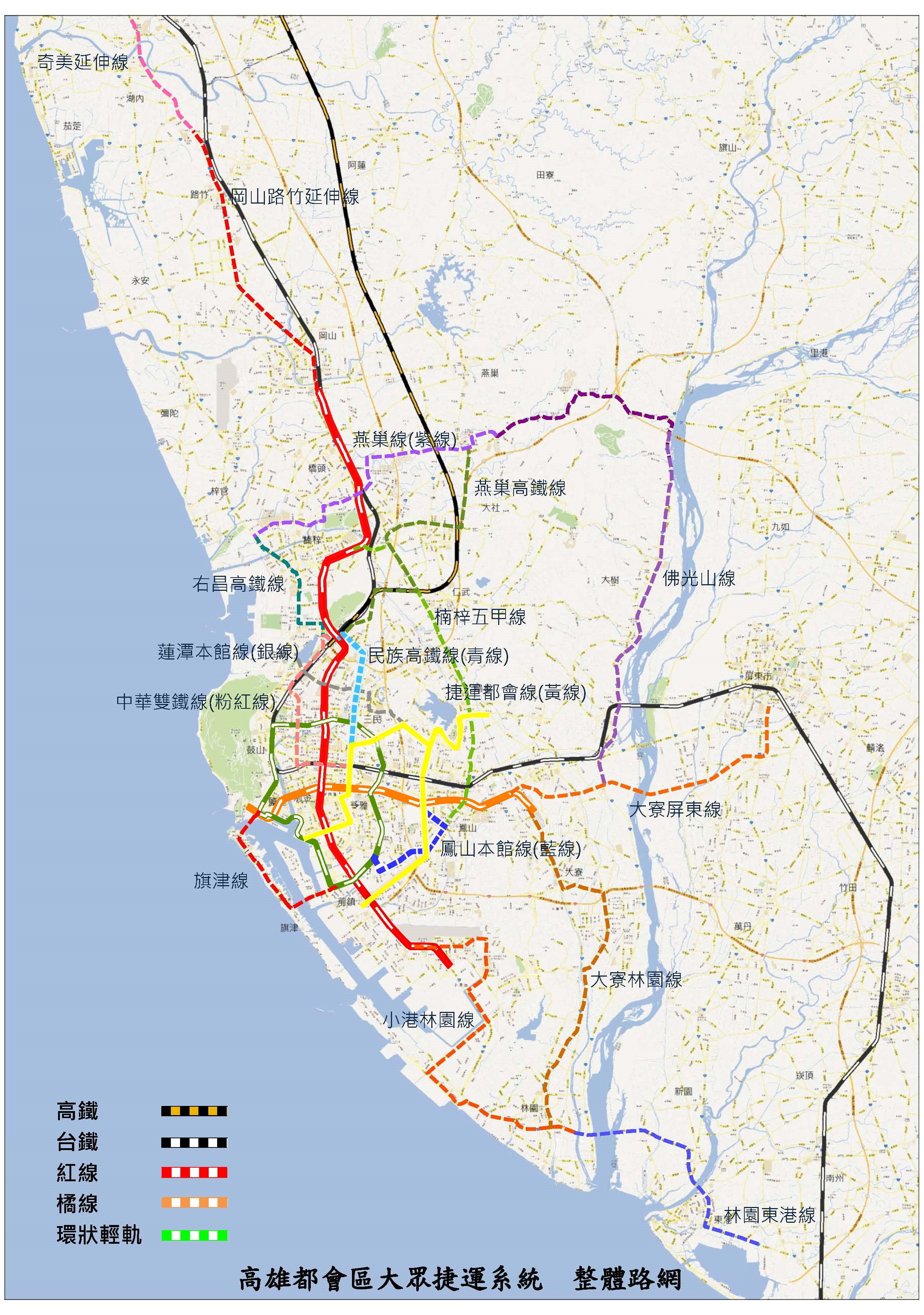
Map of transit projects in Kaohsiung (Chinese)

Kaohsiung Metro is expected to be extended further into parts of Greater Kaohsiung, as well as Pingtung County.

=== Active projects ===
Lines		Terminals	Length in km	Total Length	Status	Type	Depot
Red line	Gangshan-Lujhu extension 2A phase	Lujhu South–Gangshan	7.75	7.75	Under construction	Rapid transit	North; South
Red line	Linyuan extension	Siaogang–Linyuan Ind'l Park	12.2	12.2	Under construction	Rapid transit	Linyuan
Yellow line	Main line	Kaohsiung Exhibition Center–Niaosong		22.91	Under construction	Rapid transit	Niaosong
Yellow line	Main line	Cianjhen Senior High School–Niaosong		22.91	Under construction	Rapid transit	Niaosong

=== All projects ===
Lines		Terminals	Length in km	Total Length	Status	Type	Depot
Red line	Gangshan-Lujhu extension 2B phase	Dahu—Lujhu South	3.87	57.57	Approved	Rapid transit	North; South
Red line	Gangshan-Lujhu extension 2A phase	Lujhu South—Gangshan	12.2	57.57	Under construction. Expected to be completed by 2027.	Rapid transit	North; South
Red line	Gangshan-Lujhu extension 1 phase	Gangshan—KMU Gangshan Hospital	1	57.57	In operation	Rapid transit	North; South
Red line	Main line	KMU Gangshan Hospital—Siaogang	28.3	57.57	In operation	Rapid transit	North; South
Red line	Linyuan extension	Siaogang—Linyuan Ind'l Park	12.2	57.57	Under construction Expected to be completed by 2030	Rapid transit	North; South
Red line	Chemei extension	Dahu—Chimei Museum	7.05	7.05	Proposed	Rapid transit	North; South
Orange line	Main line	Sizihwan—Daliao	14.4	14.4	In operation	Rapid transit	Daliao
Circular line	Phase I (Main line)	Lizihnei—Hamasen	8.7	22.1	In operation	LRT	Cianjhin
Circular line	Phase II (Main line)	Hamasen—LRT Depot	13.4	22.1	In operation	LRT	Cianjhin
Yellow line	Main line	Kaohsiung Exhibition Center—Niaosong		22.91	Under construction. Expected to be completed in 2028.	Rapid transit	Niaosong
Yellow line	Main line	Cianjhen Senior High School—Niaosong		22.91	Under construction. Expected to be completed in 2028.	Rapid transit	Niaosong
Yellow line	Cianjhin fishing port extension	Cianjhen Senior High School—Cianjhin fishing port			Proposed	Rapid transit	Niaosong
Purple line	Main line	KMU—Shu-Te University	25.35	36	Proposed	Rapid transit	Yanchao
Purple line	Longterm extension	Shu-Te University—Buddha Memorial Hall	10.65	36	Proposed	Rapid transit	Yanchao
Linyuan-Donggang line	Main line	Linyuan—Donggang—Dapengwan	10.9	10.9	Proposed	LRT	
Sliver line	Main line	Lotus Pond—Benguan	6.17	6.17	Proposed		
Pink line	Main line	Zuoying—Minzu 1st Rd.	8.39	8.39	Proposed		
Daliao-Linyuan line	Main line	Daliao—Linyuan	14.67	14.67	Proposed		
Daliao-Pingtung line	Main line	Fongshan Jr. HS—Taisugar PT FTY	14.0	14.0	Proposed		
Yanchao-HSR line	Main line	Zuoying—Shu-Te University	15.9	15.9	Proposed		
Fongshan line	Main line	Ruixiang Jr. HS—Niaosong	8.32	8.32	Proposed		
Green line	Main line	Cianjhen Senior High School—Houjing	19.16	19.16	Proposed		
Foguangshan line	Main line	Siliao—Cable-Stayed Bridge	16.06	16.06	Proposed		
Cijin line	Main line	Hamasen—Kaisyuan Jhonghua	7.39	7.39	Proposed		

== Rolling stock ==
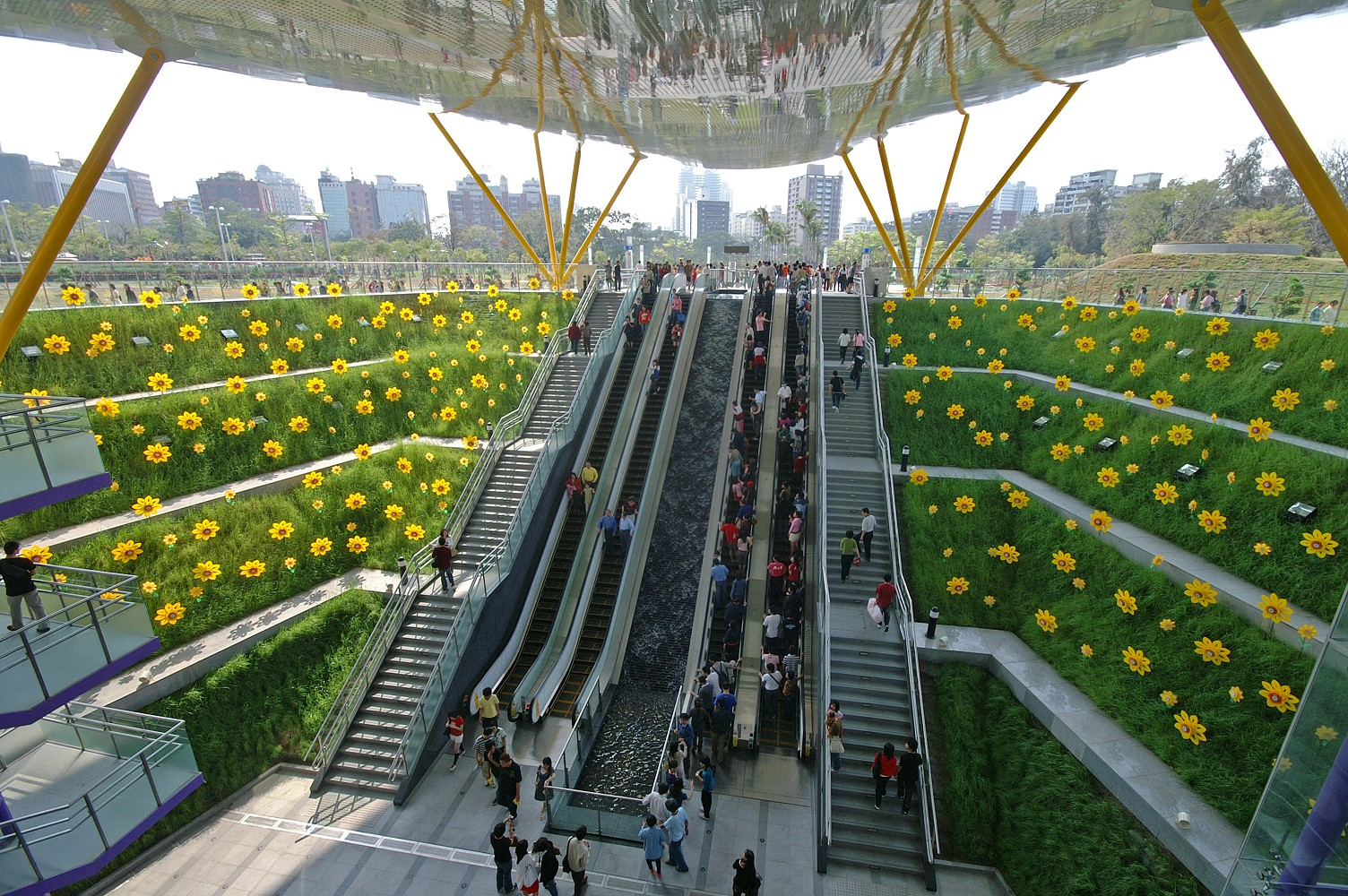
Central Park Station courtyard

The rolling stock is based on the Siemens Modular Metro design manufactured by Siemens Mobility. Trains run in three car sets (though platforms are designed to be able to accommodate up to six car sets) and are powered by third rail. Seats are arranged parallel to the windows, unlike their Taipei Metro counterparts. LED displays are installed above every alternate door (other doors show the route map), showing the name of the current station and next station in Chinese and English. Automated announcements are made in Mandarin, Taiwanese (with the exception of Kaohsiung Arena since no Taiwanese translation for the name is available), Hakka, and English, with Japanese announcements at the major stations. The train has AC traction motors with IGBT–VVVF inverters powered by Siemens.

== Fares and ticketing ==
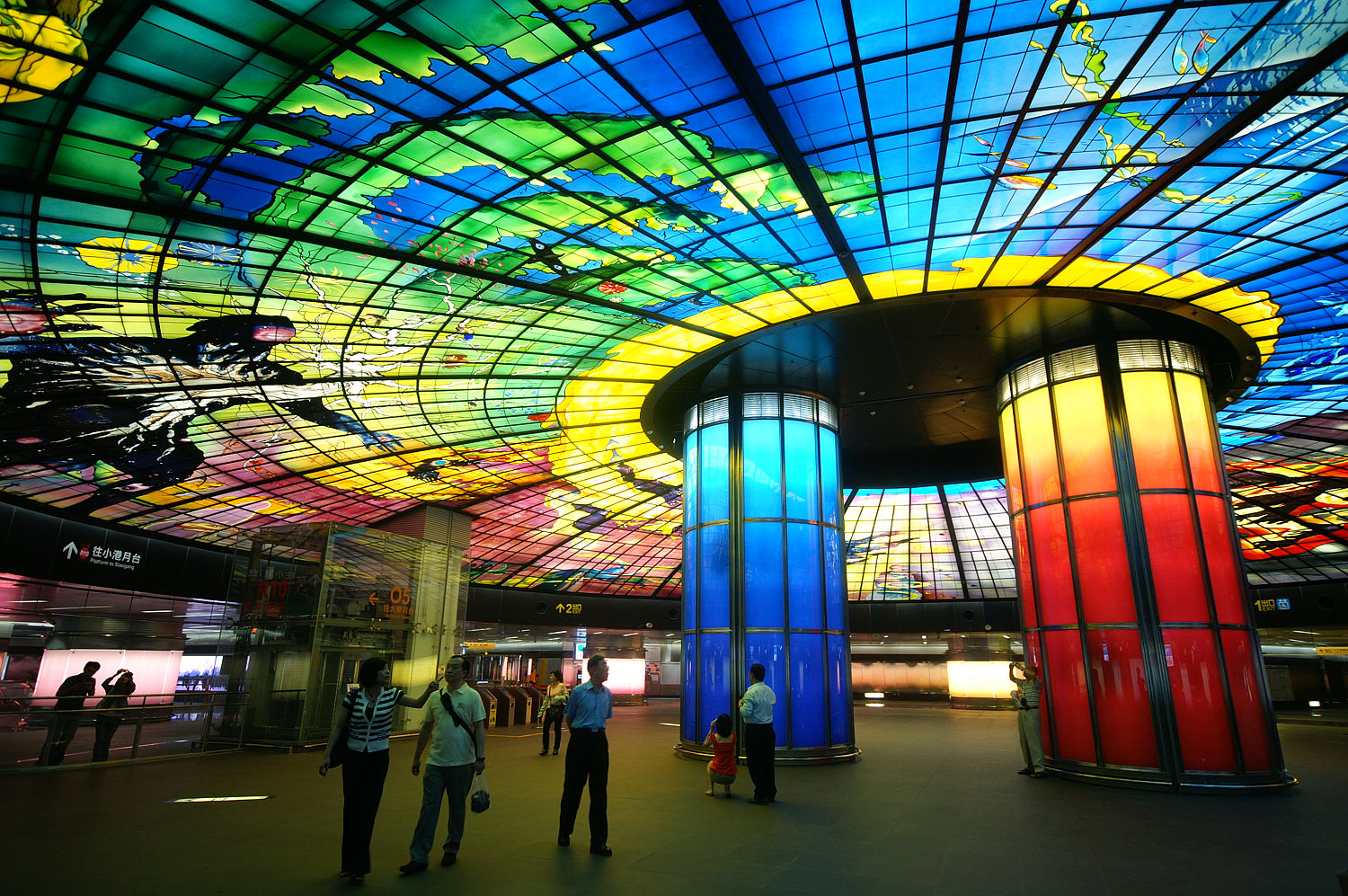
Formosa Boulevard metro station's "Dome of Light"

The fares of KMRT is distance-based, with a minimum of NT$20 for trips within 10 km (6.2 mi). The maximum fare on the Red line is NT$60, from Siaogang Station to Ciaotou Station.

One-way fare is ticketed with an RFID IC token. In addition to the RFID IC token, there are four kinds of contactless smart card accepted. The iPASS card was the only card that could be used before 1 July 2016. Since 1 July 2016, EasyCard, iCash2.0, and HappyCash have been accepted by the system.

== Ridership ==
As of December 2024, the average daily ridership stood at about 178,802 on the MRT, for a total annual ridership of 65.44 million trips. The LRT has a total annual ridership of 12.58 million trips. During New Year's Eve on 31 December 2012, the system transported 472,378 passengers.

View source data.

== Art ==
Kaohsiung Arena Station, Formosa Boulevard Station, and Kaohsiung International Airport Station feature artworks integrated into the design of the station by international artists.

== Facilities and services ==
Platform screen doors were supplied by ST Electronics have been installed at all underground stations. LCD television units have also been installed on platform doors for the broadcast of train information and advertisements. All stations are wheelchair accessible.

== Mascots ==
The most famous mascots of Kaohsiung Metro are the K.R.T. Girls, who are four anime-styled characters, and Mikan that is station master of Ciaotou Sugar Refinery metro station as mascot since 2020 become more popular.

== See also ==
- Kaohsiung Rapid Transit Corporation
- List of metro systems
- Rail transport in Taiwan
- Taipei Metro
