= Glory Pier =

Pier in Lingya, Kaohsiung, Taiwan

Glory Pier 光榮碼頭
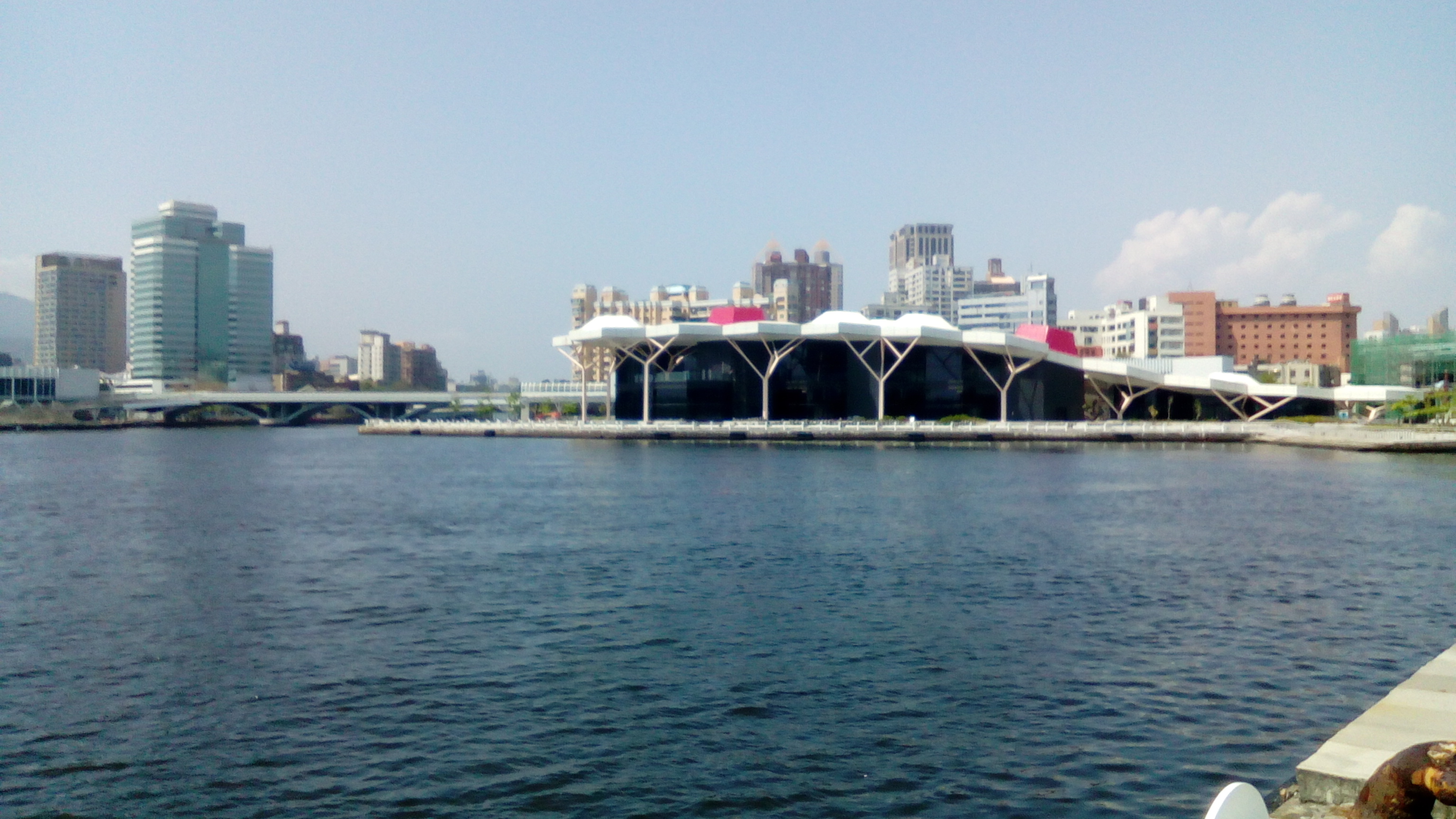
- The Kaohsiung ARGO Yacht Club building at Glory Pier.
- Type: pier
- Location: Lingya, Kaohsiung, Taiwan
- Coordinates: 22°37′06.6″N 120°17′32.9″E

The Glory Pier (traditional Chinese: 光榮碼頭; simplified Chinese: 光荣码头; pinyin: Guāngróng Mǎtóu) is a pier at the river mouth of Love River in Lingya District, Kaohsiung, Taiwan.

== History ==
The pier was originally known as Pier 13 in which it used to serve as the military port that connected between Kaohsiung and Kinmen and Matsu. After its retirement as military port in 2005, the Kaohsiung City Government renamed the pier to be Glory Pier to commemorate its glorious history. The government also built a 500 meters-long path along the pier which turning it into a new scenic with the view of the bay.

== Activities ==
There have been numerous cultural and art exhibitions and live performances held at the pier, such as the annual Kaohsiung Maritime Expo and Kaohsiung's Lunar New Year celebrations (branded as Kaohsiung Wonderland since 2024).

The Kaohsiung ARGO Yacht Club is at the pier.

In 2013 and 2024, Rubber Duck (sculpture) was exhibited in the pier.

The pier features a bridge that connects to the other side of the Love River.

== Transportation ==
The Glory Pier light rail station opened in 2015.

The pier is accessible within walking distance west of Central Park Station of Kaohsiung MRT.

== Around the pier (within 1 km) ==
Metro Stations

- Glory Pier light rail station
- Love Pier light rail station
- Cruise Terminal light rail station

Piers, Rivers, and Parks

- Love Pier
- Love River
- Shigang Riverside Park

Art Centers

- Kaohsiung Music Center
- Pier-2 Art Center

Night Markets and Shopping Centers

- Hanshin Department Store
- Lingya/Ziqiang Night Market

Bridges

- Lingyaliao Iron Bridge

== See also ==
- List of tourist attractions in Taiwan
