= Cruise Terminal =

Cruise Terminal may refer to:

- Passenger terminal (maritime)
- Cruise Terminal light rail station
