= Love Pier =

Pier in Yancheng, Kaohsiung, Taiwan

Love Pier 真愛碼頭
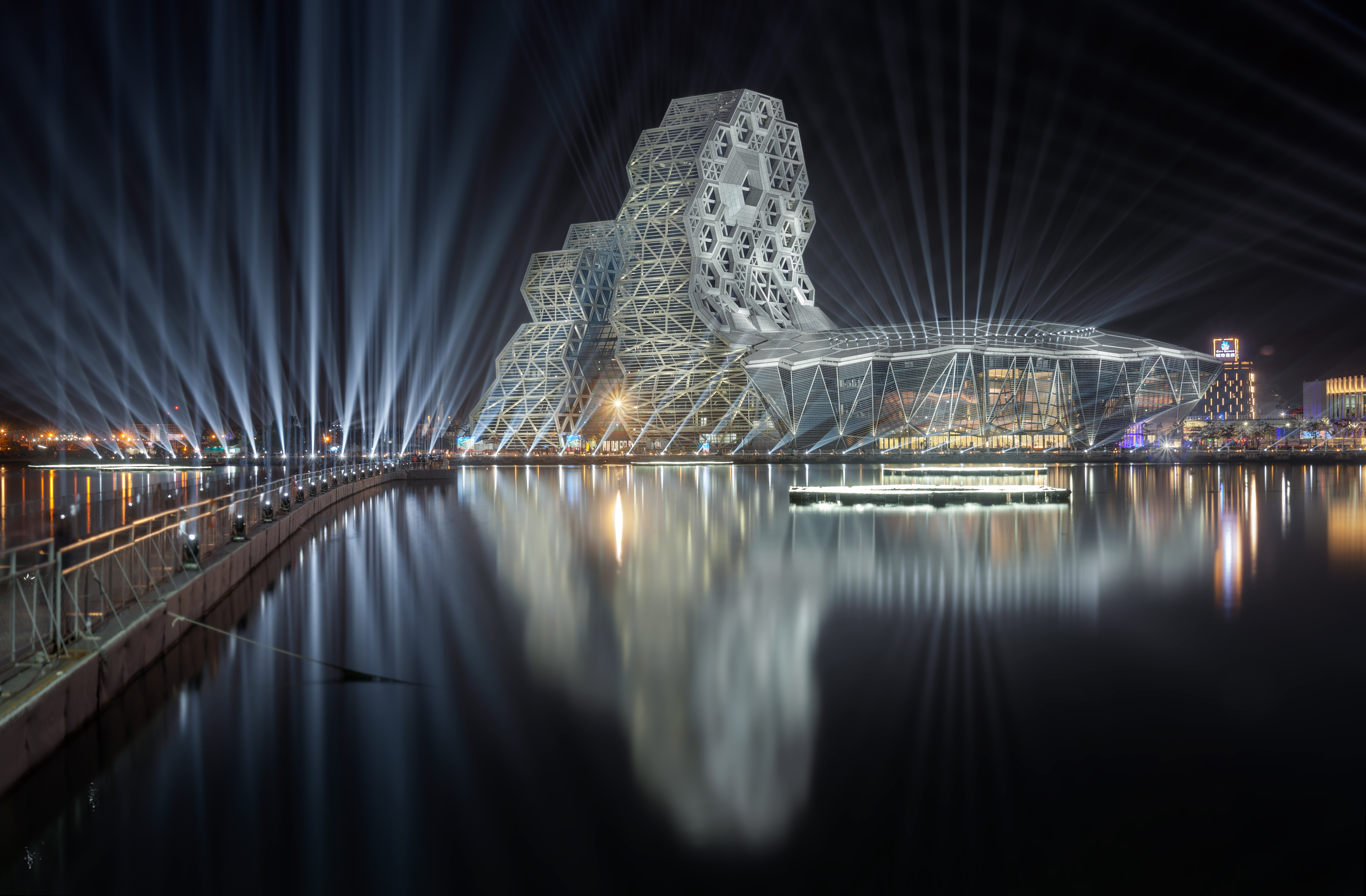
- Kaohsiung Music Center at Love Pier
- Type: pier
- Location: Yancheng, Kaohsiung, Taiwan
- Coordinates: 22°37′07.1″N 120°17′22.8″E

The Love Pier (traditional Chinese: 真愛碼頭; simplified Chinese: 真爱码头; pinyin: Zhēn'ài Mǎtóu; Pe̍h-ōe-jī: Chin-ài Bé-thâu) is a pier along Love River in Yancheng District, Kaohsiung, Taiwan.

== History ==
The pier area used to be the No. 12 dock of the Republic of China Armed Forces.

== Features ==
Love Pier is famous for the Kaohsiung Music Center building.

It also houses the South District Police Department movie set building, made for the Taiwanese series Black and White.

== Transportation ==
Love Pier light rail station opened in 2015.

The pier is accessible within walking distance East from Yanchengpu Station of Kaohsiung MRT.

== Popular culture ==
- Black and White
- Hi My Sweetheart

== See also ==
- List of tourist attractions in Taiwan
