= Love Pier light rail station =

Light rail station in Kaohsiung, Taiwan

Coordinates: 22.6193°N 120.2894°E

Love Pier C11 真愛碼頭站
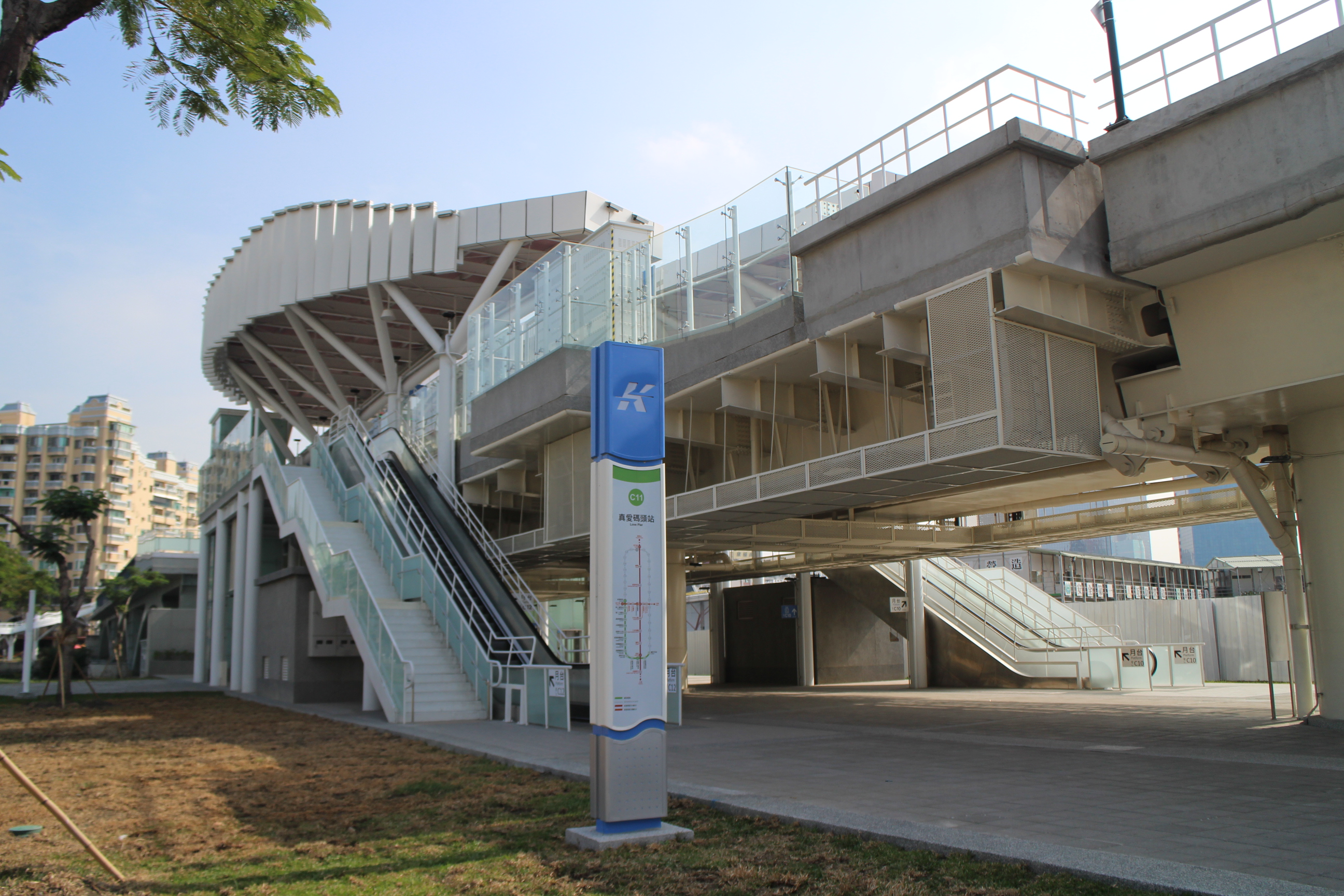

General information
- Location: Yancheng, Kaohsiung; Taiwan
- Operated by: Kaohsiung Rapid Transit Corporation
- Line: Circular line
- Platforms: 2 side platforms
- Connections: Bus stop

Construction
- Structure type: Elevated
- Accessible: Yes

Other information
- Station code: C11

History
- Opened: October 16, 2015

Services
Preceding station	Kaohsiung Metro	Following station
Glory Pier outer loop / anticlockwise	Circular light rail	Dayi Pier-2 inner loop / clockwise
Location

Love Pier (Chinese: 真愛碼頭站; pinyin: Zhēnài Mǎtóu) is a light rail station of the Circular line of the Kaohsiung rapid transit system. It is located in Yancheng District, Kaohsiung, Taiwan.

== Station overview ==
This is an elevated station with two side platforms. It is located at the junction of Bijhong Road and Gongyuan 2nd Road, beside Love Pier.

== Station layout ==
Street level	Side platform
Street level	← Circular light rail toward Hamasen (Dayi Pier-2)
Street level	→ Circular light rail toward Lizihnei (Glory Pier)
Street level	Side platform

== Around the station ==
- Love Pier
- Kaohsiung Music Center
- Lingyaliao Iron Bridge
- Shigang Riverside Park
- Dayi Park
- Kaohsiung Harbor Piers 11 and 12
