= Lingya District =

District in Kaohsiung, Taiwan

Lingya 苓雅區
- District
- Lingya District
- Lingya District in Kaohsiung City
- Coordinates: 22°37′24.9″N 120°19′1.3″E
- Country: Republic of China (Taiwan)
- Region: Southern Taiwan
- Special municipality: Kaohsiung

Government
  - Body: Lingya District Office
  - Mayor: Zheng Mei-hua (鄭美華)

Area
  - Total: 8.1522 km^{2} (3.1476 sq mi)
- Elevation: 6 m (20 ft)

Population (October 2023)
  - Total: 163,850
  - Rank: 6
  - Density: 19,916/km^{2} (51,580/sq mi)
- Time zone: UTC+8 (Taiwan Time)
- Postal code: 802
- Website: lingya-en.kcg.gov.tw

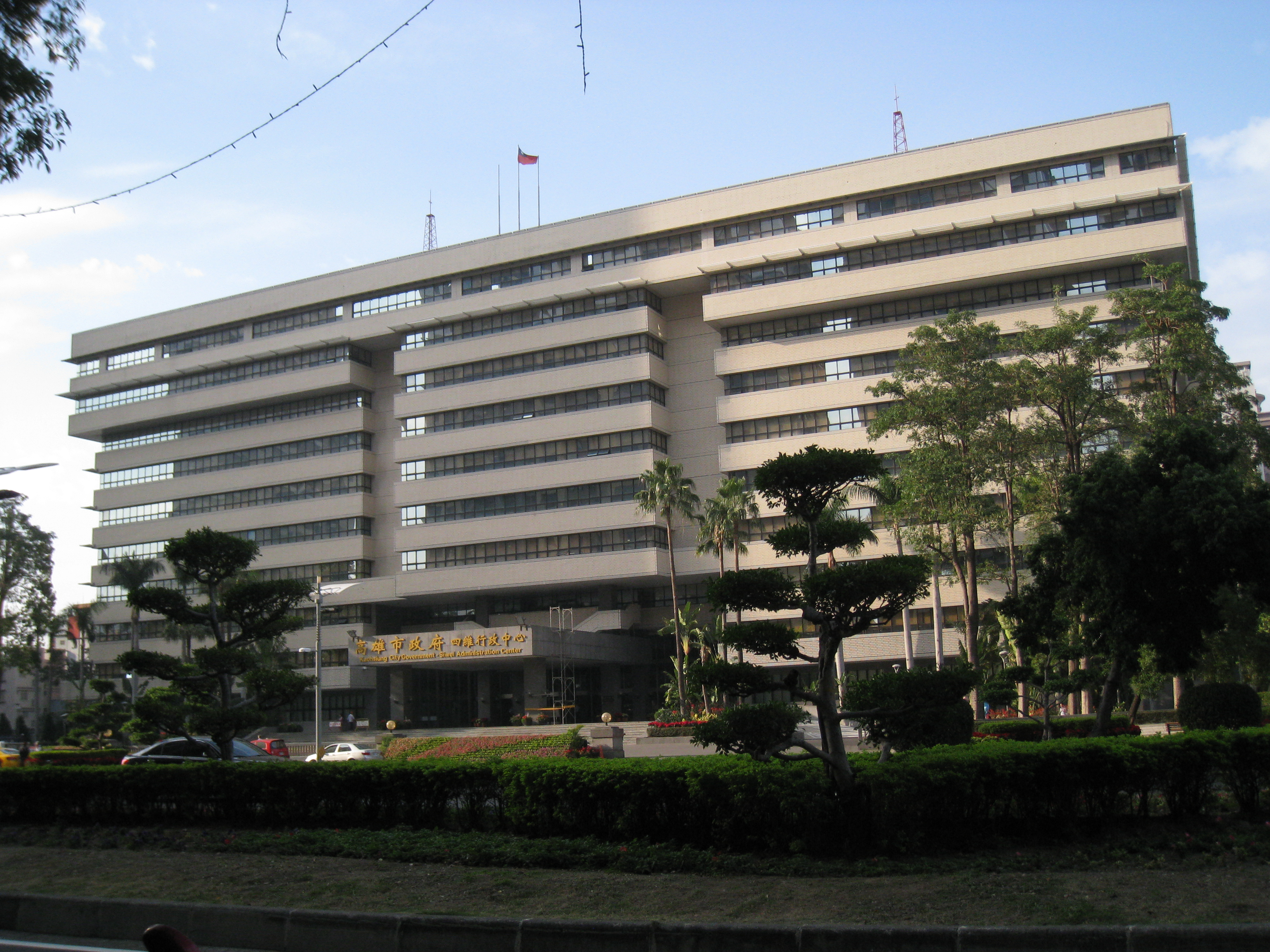
Lingya District houses the Kaohsiung City Government building.

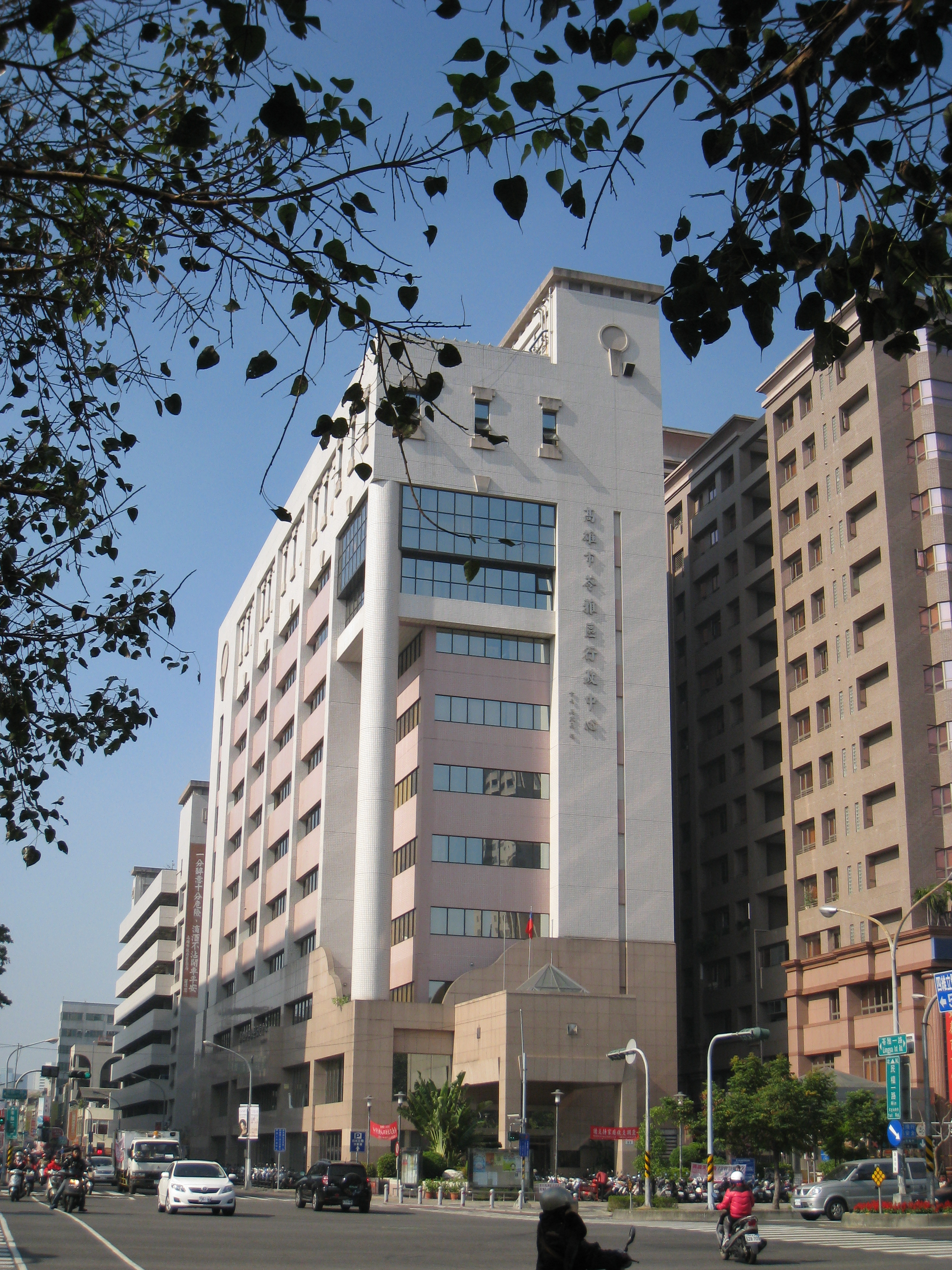
Lingya District office

Lingya District (Chinese: 苓雅區; pinyin: Língyǎ Qū) is a district of Kaohsiung, Taiwan. The 85 Sky Tower and the Kaohsiung City Hall are located here. Lingya District is the administrative center of Kaohsiung City along with Fongshan District. Its population is around 163,850 as of October 2023. It is the 6th most-populated district in Kaohsiung, with a population density of 19,916 people per square kilometer, or 51,581 people per square mile. It has an area of 8.1522 square kilometers, or 3.1476 square miles. The average elevation of Lingya is 6 meters, or 20 feet.

== Name ==
The district is named after a traditional community on the coast called "Lingyaliao" (苓雅寮; pinyin: Língyǎliáo; Pe̍h-ōe-jī: Lêng-ngá-liâu) or 苓仔寮 (Pe̍h-ōe-jī: Lêng-á-liâu), after the similar-sounding 苓仔 (Pe̍h-ōe-jī: lêng-á), which refers to a place where fishermen would put their nets after use. After 1945, the community was combined with "Guotianzi" (過田子), "Lingdeguan" (林德官), and "Wukuaicuo" (五塊厝) to form "Lienya District" (連雅區). In 1952 the original name Lingya (苓雅) was restored.

== Administrative divisions ==
Administrative divisions of Lingya District

The district is divided into 69 villages, which are subdivided into 1,248 neighborhoods. Traditionally, Lingya is divided into 4 areas, although they are rarely used today. They are:

- Guotianzai <west central> (過田仔)
- Lindeguan <east central> (林德官)
- Lingyaliao <west> (苓仔寮)
- Wukuaicuo <east> (五塊厝)

Villages in the district are Boren, Lingzhou, Lingsheng, Lingzhong, Lingya, Lingtung, Chengbei, Chengxi, Chengtung, Yicheng, Guzhong, Tianxi, Renhe, Renzheng, Guangze, Meitian, Huatang, Rizhong, Puzhao, Hexu, Qinglang, Putian, Linfu, Linwei, Linan, Guanghua, Linxing, Linhua, Linxi, Linzhong, Linquan, Linnan, Zhongzheng, Shangyi, Tongqing, Kaixuan, Anxiang, Zoujie, Fushou, Funan, Wuquan, Minzhu, Linde, Lingui, Linrong, Yingming, Linjing, Zhaoyang, Fulong, Fuxiang, Fuhai, Fukang, Furen, Fude, Fuju, Futung, Fuxi, Yongkang, Zhengwen, Zhengyan, Zhengda, Wufu, Zhengxin, Zhengdao, Zhengyi, Zhengren, Wenchang, Jianjun and Weiwu Village.

== Education ==
=== Universities ===
- National Sun Yat-sen University
- National Kaohsiung Normal University

=== Schools ===
- Kaohsiung Japanese School
- Kaohsiung Municipal Jhong-Jheng Senior High School

== Tourist attractions ==
- 85 Sky Tower
- Birthday Park
- Chen Jhong-he Memorial Hall
- Chung Cheng Martial Arts Stadium
- Glory Pier
- Guanghua Night Market
- Holy Rosary Cathedral
- Kaohsiung City Lingya Sports Center
- Kaohsiung Cultural Center
- Kaohsiung Guandi Temple
- Kaohsiung Music Center
- Kaohsiung Port Cruise Terminal
- Kaohsiung Wonderland (annually since 2024)
- Maritime Park
- Rainbow Park
- Sihwei Flower Park
- Singjhong Flower Market
- Singuang Ferry Wharf
- Tomb of Chen Jhong-he
- Water Tower Park

== Transportation ==
=== Train stations ===
- KMRT Cultural Center Station
- KMRT Martial Arts Stadium Station
- KMRT Sanduo Shopping District Station
- KMRT Weiwuying Station
- KMRT Wukuaicuo Station
- KLRT Kaisyuan Park Station
- KLRT Department of Health Station
- KLRT Wucyuan Elementary School Station
- KLRT Kaisyuan Wuchang Station
- KLRT Cruise Terminal Station
- KLRT Glory Pier Station (connects to Glory Pier)

=== Highways ===
- Freeway 1
- Provincial Highways 1F and 17

=== Harbors ===
- Glory Pier

== Notable natives ==
- A-Lin, singer
- Hsu Kun-yuan, former politician
