= Kaohsiung Municipal Jhong-Jheng Senior High School =

Senior high school in Lingya, Kaohsiung, Taiwan

Coordinates: 22.626217°N 120.338681°E

高雄市立中正高級中學 Kaohsiung Municipal Jhongjheng Senior High School

Location
- No.8, Jhongjheng 1st Road, Lingya District, Kaohsiung City

Information
- Other name: Kaohsiung Municipal; Jhongjheng Senior High School
- Type: Municipal high school
- Motto: Perseverance, Industrious, Innovation, Fresh, Love, Excellence
- Established: Junior high school established 1989; Senior high school established 1996
- School district: Lingya, Kaohsiung, Taiwan
- Principal: Bing-shan Lu (陸炳杉)
- Staff: 193
- Grades: 7-12
- Enrollment: Senior high school: 1150 persons; Junior high school: 650 persons
- The number of classes: 33(Senior high school)、23(Junior high school) (Aug 2019)
- Postal code: 802
- Area: 32400 hectares
- tel: 886-7-749-1992
- fax: 886-7-749-7562
- Website: http://www.cchs.kh.edu.tw/

Kaohsiung Municipal Jhongjheng Senior High School (Chinese: 高雄市立中正高級中學), also known as Jhongjheng Senior High School (中正高中) or CCHS或JJHS, is a junior and senior high school located at No. 8, Jhongjheng 1st Road, Lingya District, Kaohsiung City.

== History ==
On July 1, 1989, Kaohsiung Municipal Jhongjheng Senior High School was established, the campus is located at north of Jhongjheng 1st Road and east of National Freeway No.1, the address is No.8, Jhongjheng 1st Road, Lingya District, Kaohsiung City. Mr. Tian-yong Lin was assigned as the first principal on July 15, and the first enrollment of junior high school students started on September in the same year.

On May 11, 1996, the school renamed as Kaohsiung Municipal Jhongjheng Senior High School, it became a complete high school. The first enrollment of senior high school students started on July 1 in the same year, with 6 normal classes and 1 physical education class.

== Principals ==
1. Tian-yong Lin (July 1, 1989 ~ July 31, 1997)
2. Wen-zong Hsu (Aug 1, 1997 ~ July 31, 2005)
3. Shuen-an Tu (Aug 1, 2005 ~ July 31, 2013)
4. Ruei-sian Gao (Aug 1, 2013 ~ July 31, 2019)
5. Bing-shan Lu (Aug 1, 2019 ~ present)

== See also ==
- National Fengshan Senior High School
