= Chen Jhong-he Memorial Hall =

Historic house in Lingya, Kaohsiung, Taiwan

- 陳中和紀念館
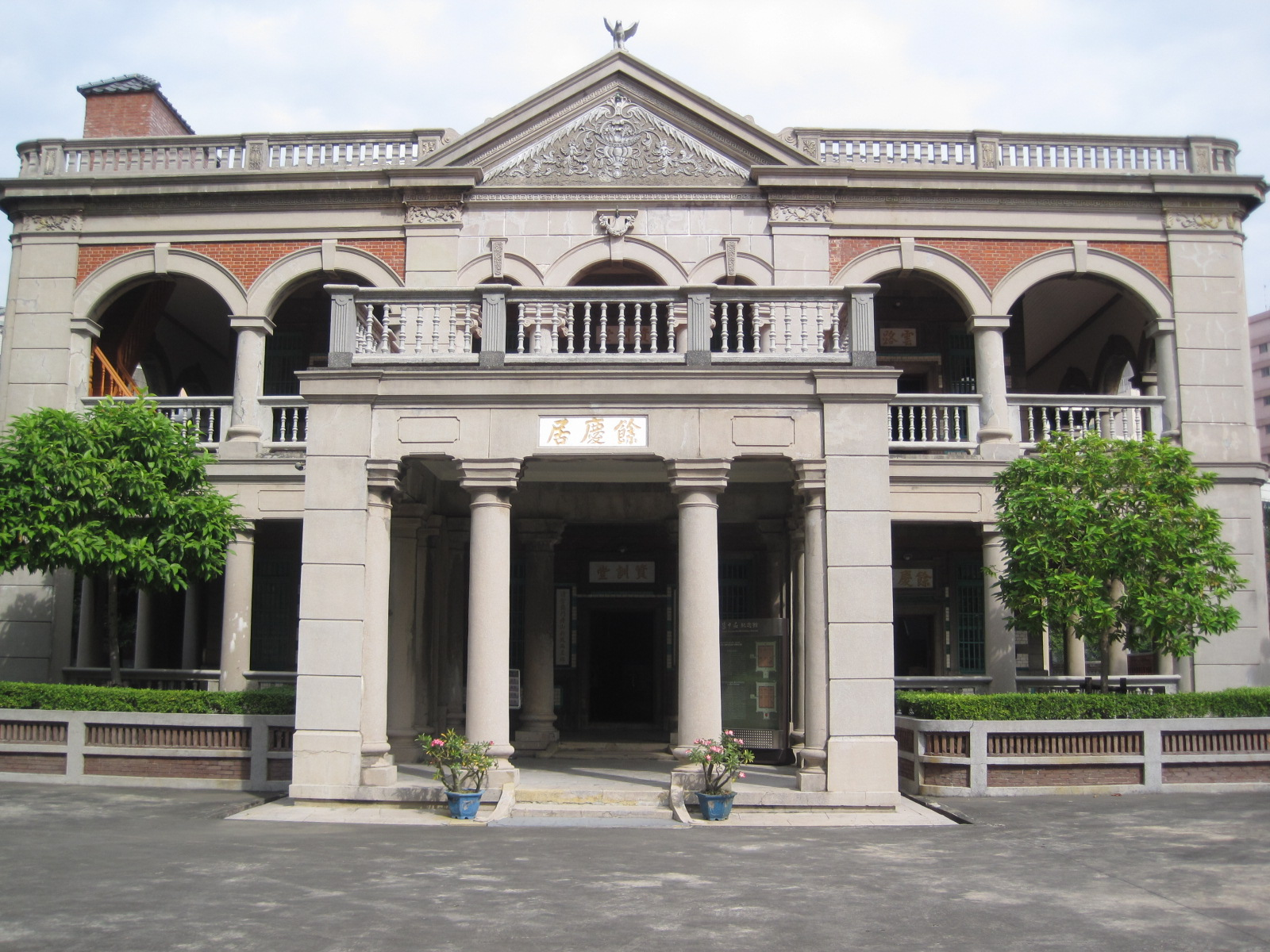
- Interactive map of the Chen Jhong-he Memorial Hall area

General information
- Type: memorial hall
- Location: Lingya, Kaohsiung, Taiwan
- Coordinates: 22°36′48.5″N 120°17′44.5″E
- Completed: 1920

Technical details
- Floor count: 2

The Chen Jhong-he Memorial Hall (traditional Chinese: 陳中和紀念館; simplified Chinese: 陈中和纪念馆; pinyin: Chén Zhōnghé Jìniànguǎn) is a memorial hall dedicated to Chen Jhong-he located in Lingya District, Kaohsiung, Taiwan.

== History ==
In 1911, Chen Jhong-he used to be the richest man in Kaohsiung. He built a Western-style terrace which was completed in 1920 which then became the first private Western residence in the city. His descendants funded renovation to the building to commemorate him and then named the building as Chen Jhong-he Memorial Hall which is now open to public.

== Architecture ==
The 2-story building was built in a European Renaissance style. However, the symmetrical layout of the main hall and patient's wards resembles traditional Taiwanese hospitals.

== Transportation ==
The building is three blocks from the Cruise Terminal light rail station.

The building is also accessible within walking distance west from Sanduo Shopping District Station of Kaohsiung MRT.

== See also ==
- List of tourist attractions in Taiwan
- Tomb of Chen Jhong-he
