= Hsu Kun-yuan =

Taiwanese politician (1957–2020)

- 許崑源
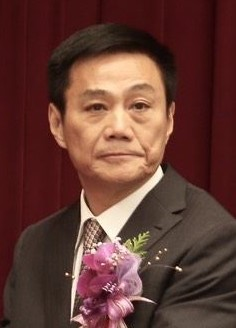

Speaker of the Kaohsiung City Council
- In office 25 December 2018 – 6 June 2020
- Preceded by: Kang Yu-cheng
- Succeeded by: Lu Shu-mei (acting); Zeng Li-yan
- Constituency: District 8
- In office 25 December 2010 – 24 December 2014
- Succeeded by: Kang Yu-cheng
- Constituency: District 8

Member of the Kaohsiung City Council
- In office 25 December 2010 – 6 June 2020
- Constituency: District 8
- In office 25 December 1994 – 25 December 2010
- Constituency: District 4

Personal details
- Born: 1 May 1957 Lingya District, Kaohsiung, Taiwan
- Died: 6 June 2020 (aged 63) Lingya District, Kaohsiung, Taiwan
- Cause of death: Suicide
- Party: Democratic Progressive Party (1986–1994); Independent (1994–2008); Kuomintang (since 2008)

Hsu Kun-yuan (Chinese: 許崑源; pinyin: Xǔ Kūnyuán; Pe̍h-ōe-jī: Khó͘ Khun-goân; 1 May 1957 – 6 June 2020) was a Taiwanese politician. He was born in Kaohsiung, Taiwan. He was a member of the Kuomintang (KMT). He was a member of the Kaohsiung City Council from 1994 until his death. From 2010 to 2014 and again from 2018 until his death, he was Speaker of the City Council.

== Biography ==
A Kaohsiung native, he and his elder brother Hsu Kun-lung (許昆龍) participated in tangwai movements in the 1980s, and they joined the Democratic Progressive Party (DPP) in 1986. However, Hsu Kun-lung's reputation was tarnished after being involved in a criminal case where two policeman were killed. As a result, Hsu Kun-yuan decided to continue his brother's deeds, and further his political career.

In 1994, Hsu was elected a Kaohsiung city councilor as an independent, having left the DPP. In 2004, in order to gain the position of speaker, Hsu wanted to form an alliance with the Kuomintang. However, Ma Ying-jeou opposed it, and Hsu was forced to be relegated to compete for the position of vice-speaker.

In 2008, after the election of Ma Ying-jeou as President of Taiwan, Hsu officially joined the KMT. He stated that the reason for joining was that his beliefs were closer to the Kuomintang. In 2010, Hsu was elected Speaker of the Kaohsiung City Council.

In 2018, he was re-elected as Speaker of the Kaohsiung City Council.

Hsu jumped to his death from his apartment in Kaohsiung on 6 June 2020, hours after the Han Kuo-yu mayoral recall vote. Hsu was known for being an ardent supporter of Han.
