= Glory Pier light rail station =

Light rail station in Kaohsiung, Taiwan

Coordinates: 22.6168°N 120.2932°E

Glory Pier C10 光榮碼頭站
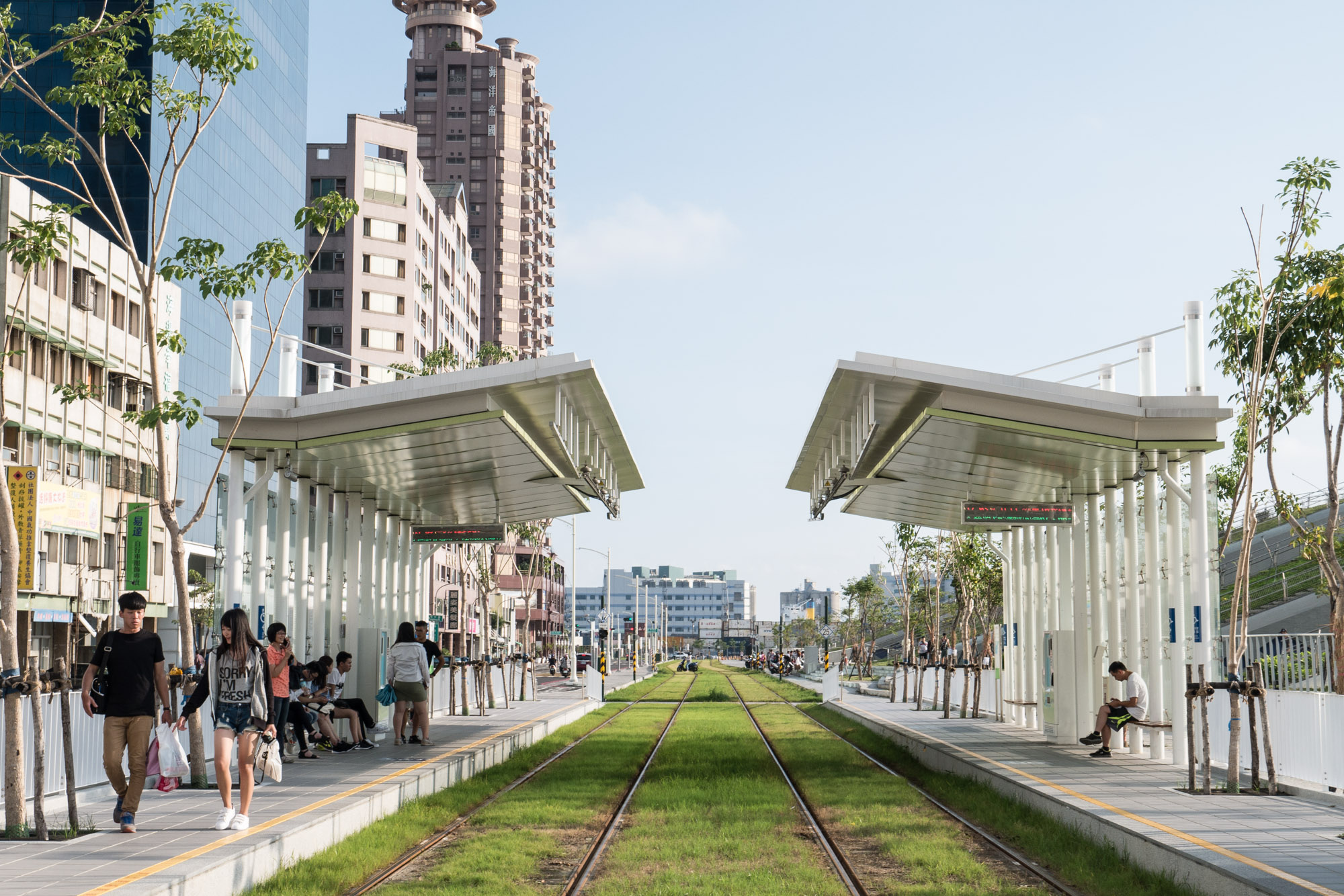

General information
- Location: Lingya, Kaohsiung; Taiwan
- Operated by: Kaohsiung Rapid Transit Corporation
- Line: Circular line
- Platforms: 2 side platforms
- Connections: Bus stop

Construction
- Structure type: At-grade
- Accessible: Yes

Other information
- Station code: C10

History
- Opened: October 16, 2015

Services
| Preceding station | Kaohsiung Metro | Following station |
|---|---|---|
| Cruise Terminal outer loop / anticlockwise | Circular light rail | Love Pier inner loop / clockwise |
Location

Glory Pier (Chinese: 光榮碼頭站; pinyin: Guāngróng Mǎtóu) is a light rail station of the Circular Line of the Kaohsiung rapid transit system. It is located in Lingya District, Kaohsiung, Taiwan.

== Station overview ==
This is a street-level station with two side platforms. It is located at the junction of Cingnian 2nd Road, Yongping Road, and Haibian Road, beside Glory Pier.

== Station layout ==
| Street level | Side platform |
| Street level | ← Circular light rail toward Hamasen (Love Pier) |
| Street level | → Circular light rail toward Lizihnei (Cruise Terminal) |
| Street level | Side platform |

== Around the station ==
- Glory Pier
- Lingya/Ziqiang Night Market
- Hanshin Department Store
- Kaohsiung Esports Arena
