= Tomb of Chen Jhong-he =

Tomb in Lingya, Kaohsiung, Taiwan

- 陳中和墓
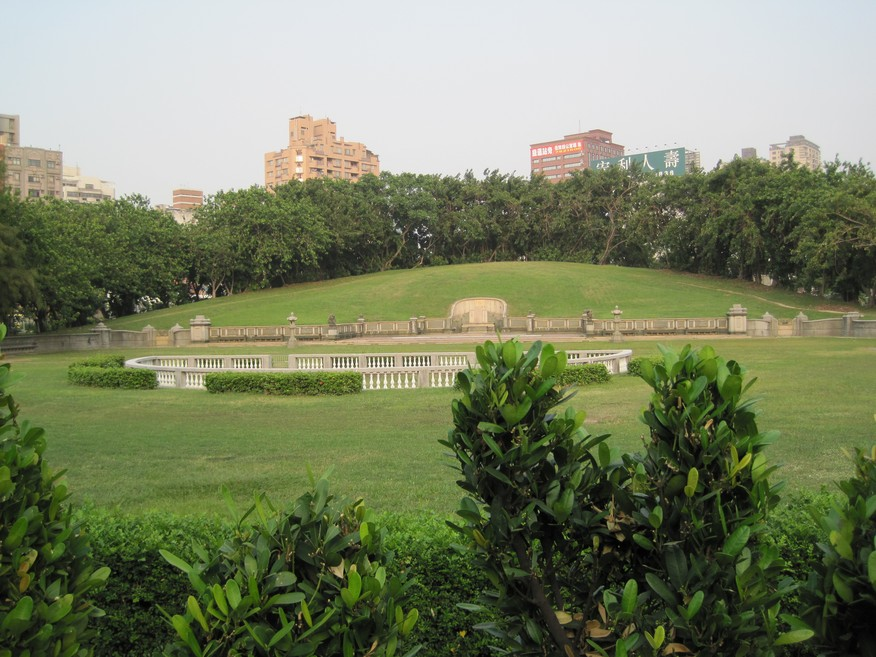
- Interactive map of Tomb of Chen Jhong-he

Details
- Established: 1935
- Location: Lingya, Kaohsiung, Taiwan
- Coordinates: 22°37′41.8″N 120°19′40.2″E
- Type: tomb
- Size: 2.235 hectares
- No. of graves: 1

The Tomb of Chen Jhong-he (traditional Chinese: 陳中和墓; simplified Chinese: 陈中和墓; pinyin: Chén Zhōnghé Mù; Pe̍h-ōe-jī: Tân Tiong-hô Bō͘) is a tomb of a prominent businessman Chen Jhong-he in Lingya District, Kaohsiung, Taiwan.

== History ==
Chen Jhong-he rose to prominence during the end of Qing Dynasty and early Japanese rule of Taiwan which made him one of the most important entrepreneurs and wealthiest businessmen. He died in 1916, and the construction of his tomb started in 1930. After five years of construction work, the tomb was completed in 1935.

== Architecture ==
The tomb covers an area of 2.235 hectares adopting a Fujian style of tomb construction and combines both Japanese and Western Baroque architecture style from the Japanese rule period.

== Transportation ==
The tomb is accessible from south of Wukuaicuo Station of Kaohsiung MRT.

== See also ==
- Chen Jhong-he Memorial Hall
