= Kaohsiung Music Center =

Music center in Lingya and Yancheng, Kaohsiung, Taiwan

- 高雄流行音樂中心
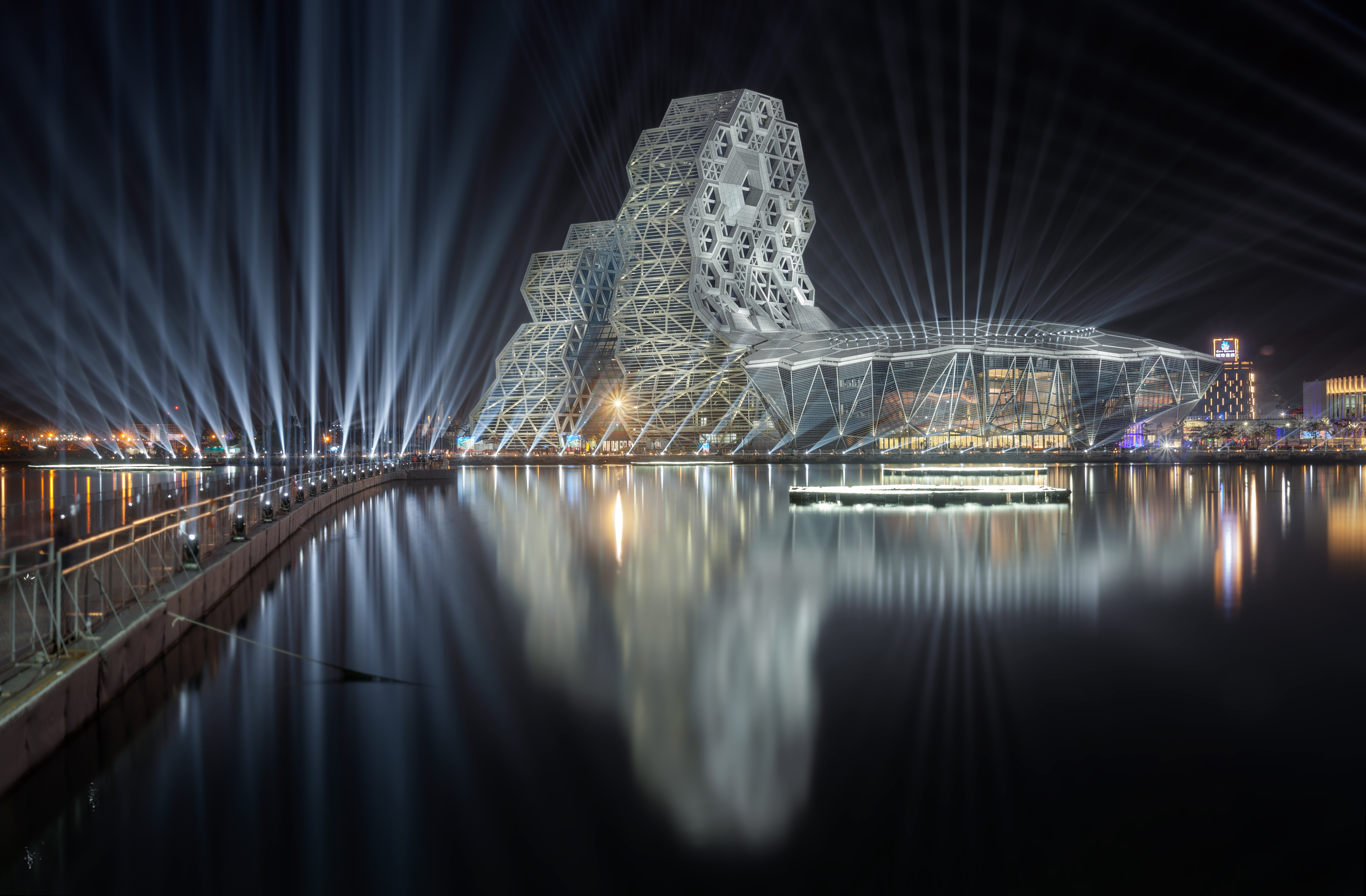
- Interactive map of Kaohsiung Music Center
- Location: Yancheng and Lingya in Kaohsiung, Taiwan
- Coordinates: 22°37′04″N 120°17′20″E
- Capacity: 6,000 (Hi-ing Music Hall); 10,000 (Hi-ing Breeze Square)
- Type: music hall
- Acreage: 11 hectares

Construction
- Opened: 31 October 2021
- Architect: Manuel Monteserin

Website
- Official website

The Kaohsiung Music Center (KMC; Chinese: 高雄流行音樂中心; pinyin: Gāoxióng Liúxíng Yīnyuè Zhōngxīn) is a music hall in Yancheng District and Lingya District in Kaohsiung, Taiwan.

== History ==
In 2009, the Executive Yuan recognized the need to establish a music center in Kaohsiung. The Council for Cultural Affairs then commissioned Kaohsiung City Government to plan, design, and construct the center. The center was officially opened on 31 October 2021 in a ceremony attended by President Tsai Ing-wen and Culture Minister Lee Yung-te.

== Architecture ==
The center was designed in 2011 by the Spanish architecture team MADE IN Architects, a group created specifically for this competition and led by architect Manuel Monteserin. The team was initially composed of Manuel Monteserin, Javier Simó, Beatriz Pachón, María Mallo, Guiomar Contreras, Nacho Álvarez Monteserin, Antonio Alejandro, Alicia Domingo, Luis Marcos, Beatriz Crespo, Ismael García, Iñigo Redondo, Jorge López, Andrés Infantes and Lain Sarustegui. The subsequent development of the project was carried out by Manuel Monteserin, Beatriz Pachón and Javier Simó, in collaboration with Eddea The project is dedicated to the pop music industry, which holds significant cultural and economic influence in this part of Asia. It comprises an outdoor amphitheater for 10,000 people, a concert hall for 6,000 people, six live houses known as the "Whales," five restaurants connected by an elevated walkway, two towers containing offices, museum spaces, and rehearsal rooms, an exhibition center, and a network of parks and promenades that link the entire site.

The design seeks to produce a heterogeneous architectural landscape, in which each building responds to its specific program and context. During the design phases the team assigned names to the different architectures, such as the "Whales" and the "Dolphins." These names were later adopted by the citizens of Kaohsiung, who now refer to the buildings in the same way.

A key objective from the competition stage was the creation of new public spaces that function independently of performances, integrating the project into the everyday life of the city. In the area of the live houses, the accessible green roofs form gentle hills overlooking the harbor and the sea. In the exhibition center, a large open shaded platform beneath hexagonal structures provides a flexible civic space that can host markets, dance events, theater, and other activities. More than a thousand trees were planted, creating a large park at the mouth of the Love River, with the expectation that the tropical humid climate will foster abundant vegetation in the coming years.

== Entertainment events ==
Entertainment events at Kaohsiung Music Center
Date	Artist	Event	Ref
2024
4–5 May	Moonbyul	Museum: An Epic of Starlit Tour	
22 June	Solar	Solar 2nd Concert "Colours" in Asia	
4 October	LANY	a beautiful blur: the world tour	
16 November	Take That	This Life On Tour	
28 December	Chanyeol	Chanyeol Live Tour: City-scapes	
2025
4 January	Cho Kyu-hyun	Kyuhyun 10th Anniversary Asia Tour [Colors]	
18–19 January	Day6	Forever Young World Tour	
25 January	Choi Min-ho	MINHO CONCERT [MEAN: of my first]	
15 February	Rain	Still Raining Tour	
22–23 March	Gfriend	GFriend 10th Anniversary Concert: Season of Memories	
24–25 May	CNBLUE	CNBLUE Live "VOYAGE into X"	
1 June	LANY	a beautiful blur: the world tour	
14 August	Camila Cabello	Yours, C Tour	
17 August	Park Bo-gum	Fan Meeting Tour 'Be With You'	
20 September	DAESUNG	D's WAVE 2025 ASIA TOUR IN KAOHSIUNG	
27 September	Sting	STING 3.0 in Kaohsiung	
2026
31 January	TWS	2025 TWS TOUR '24/7:WITH:US' in Kaohsiung	

== Gallery ==
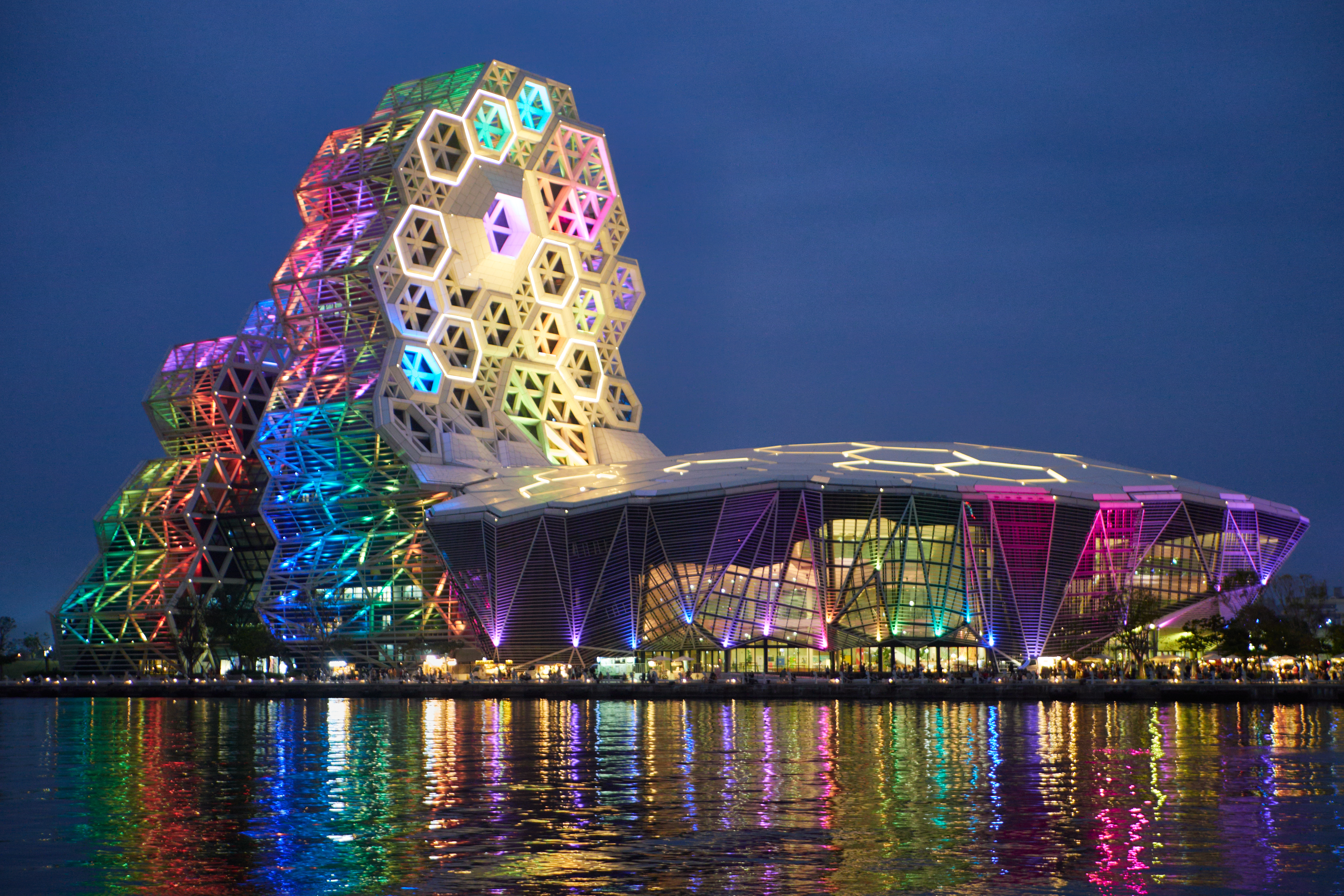
The Kaohsiung Music Center illuminated at night

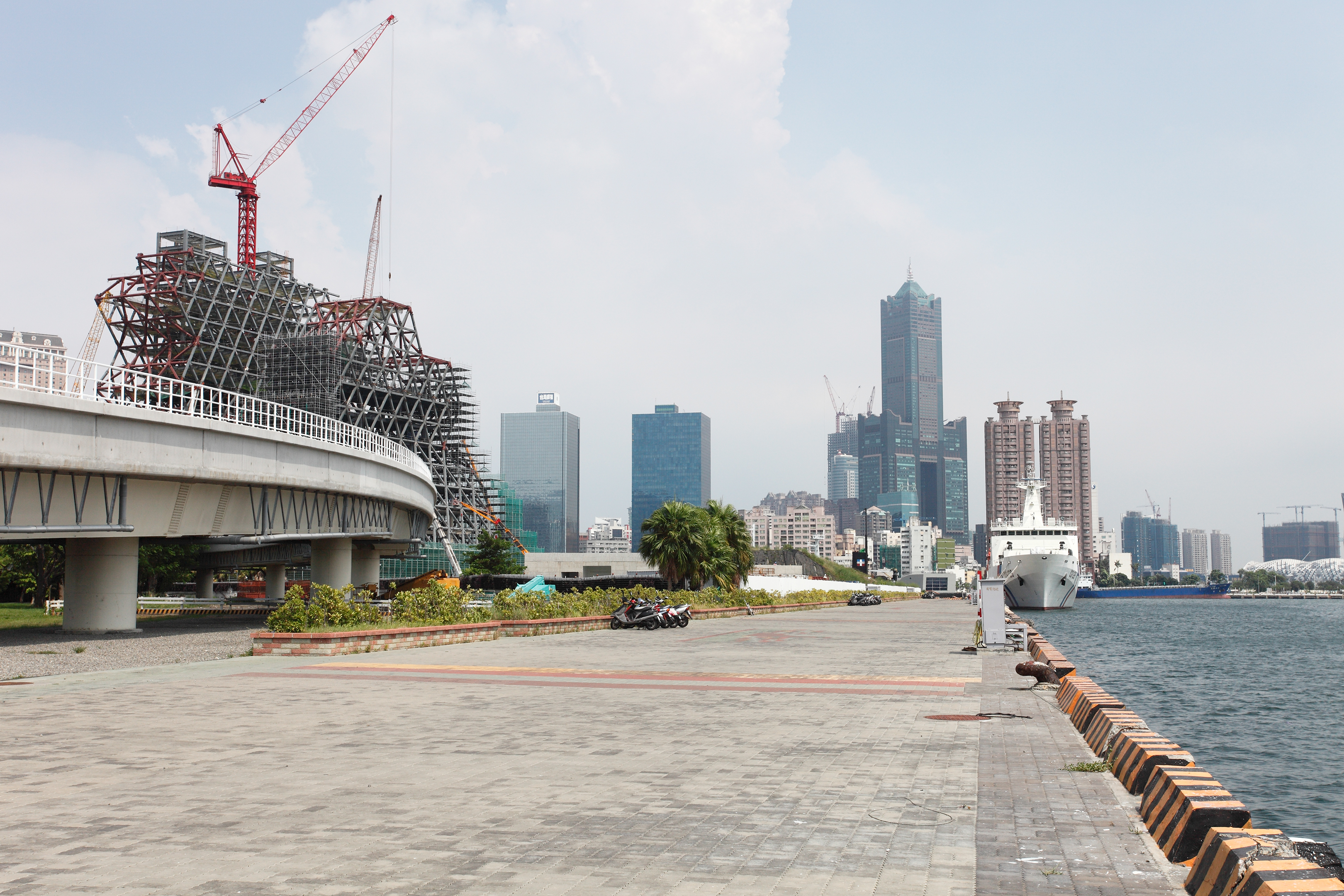
Kaohsiung Music Center under construction in 2017 from Pier 2 Art District

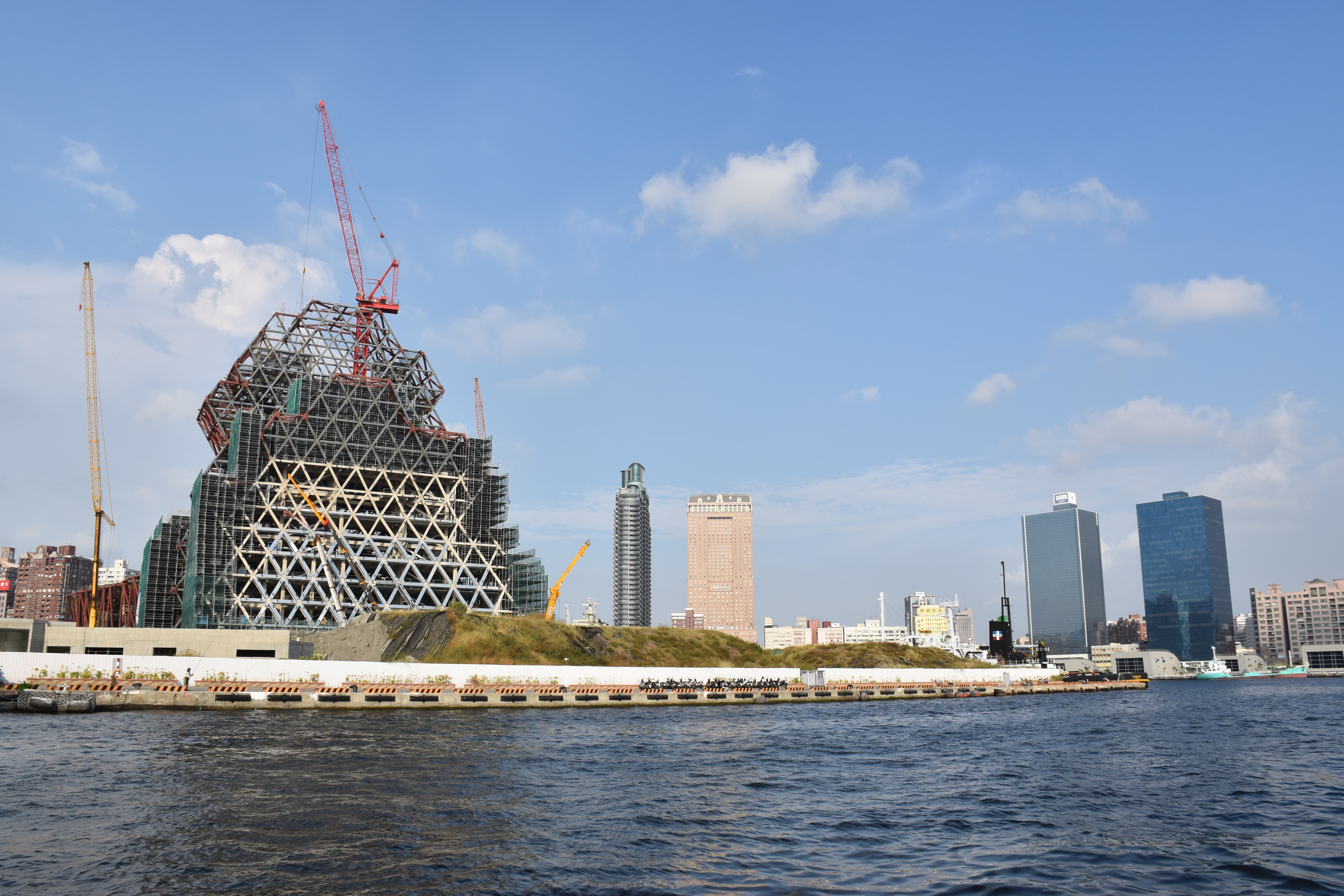
Kaohsiung Music Center under construction in October 2017

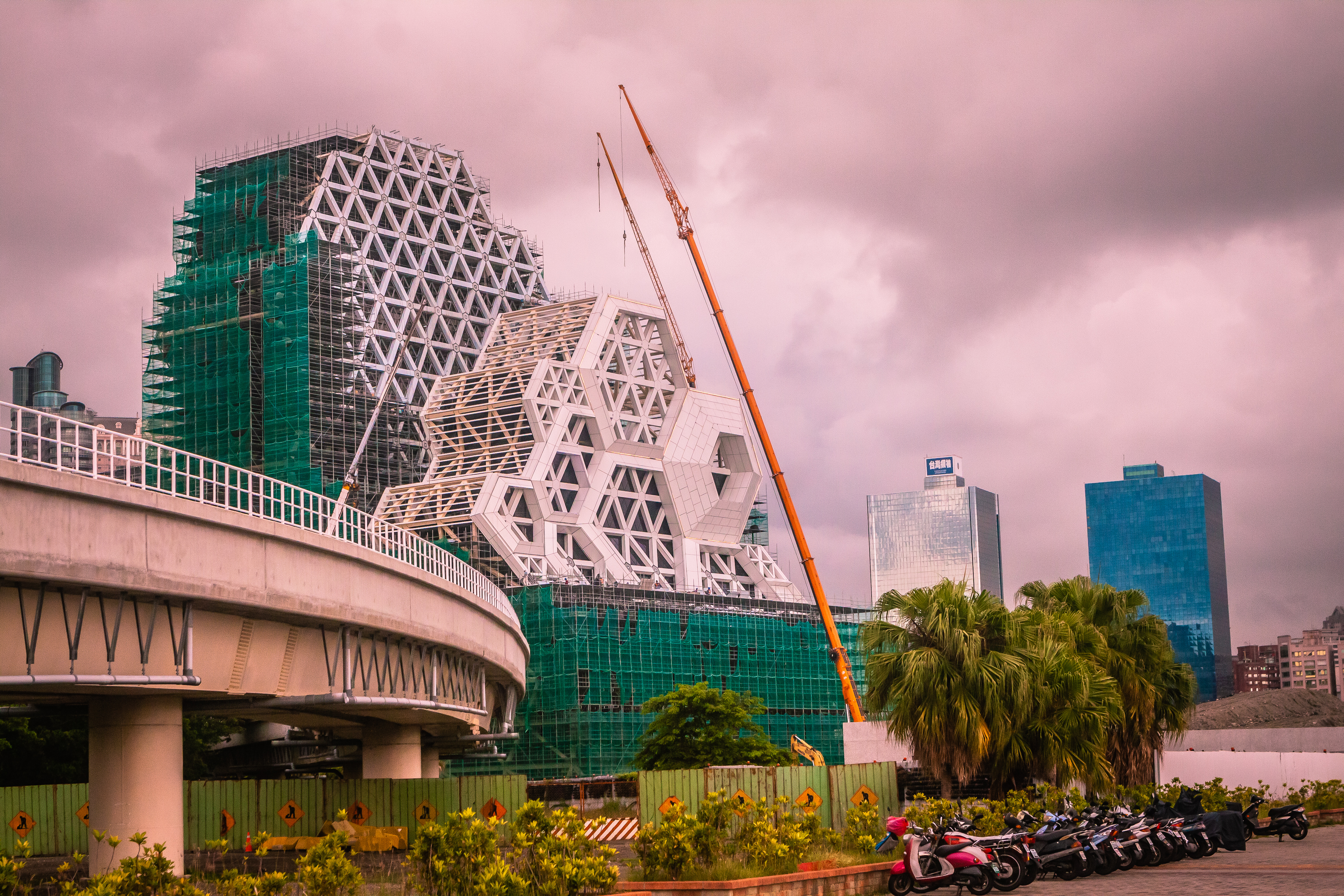
Kaohsiung Music Center under construction in July 2018

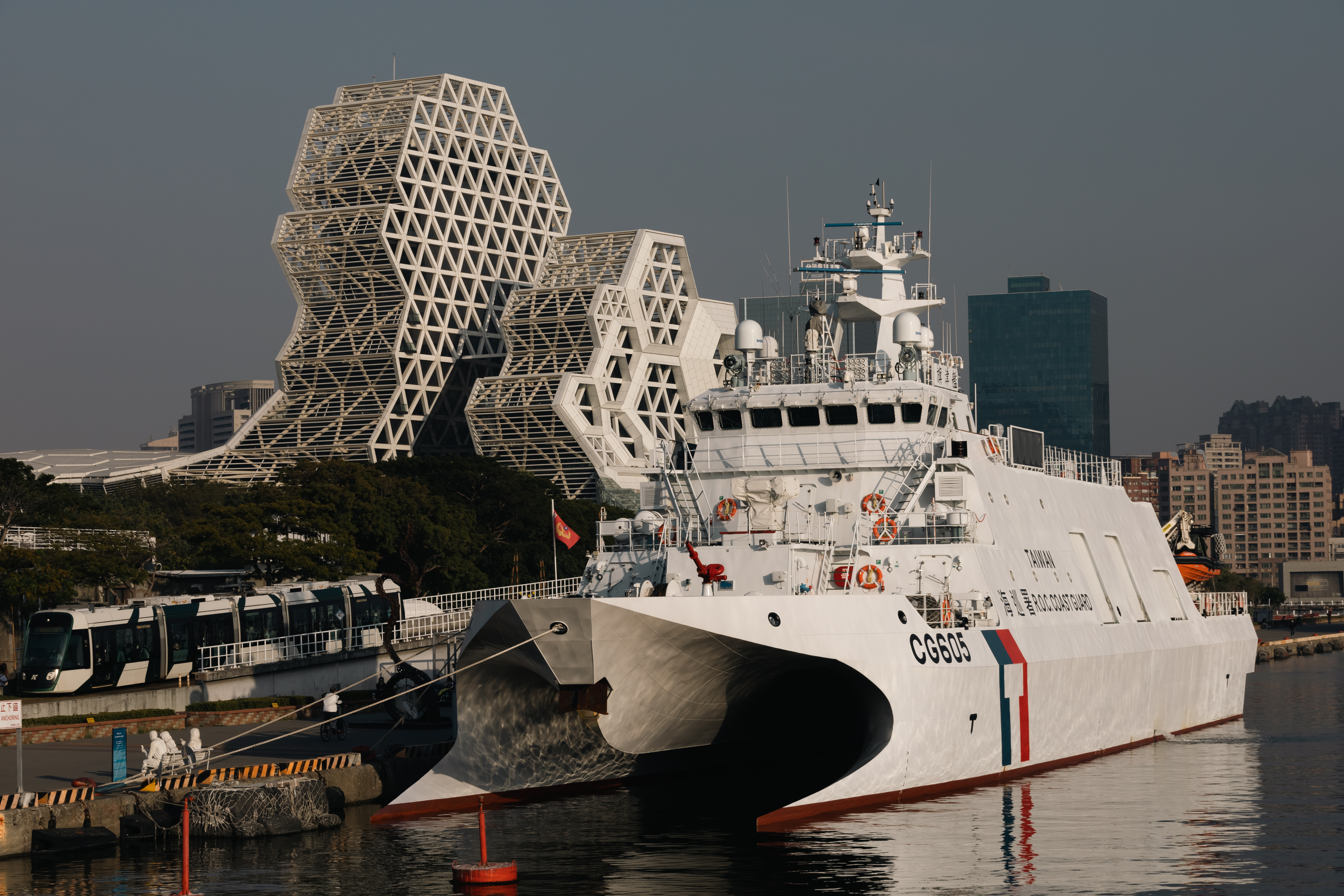
Coast Guard Administration Anping-class offshore patrol vessel in front of the Kaohsiung Music Center

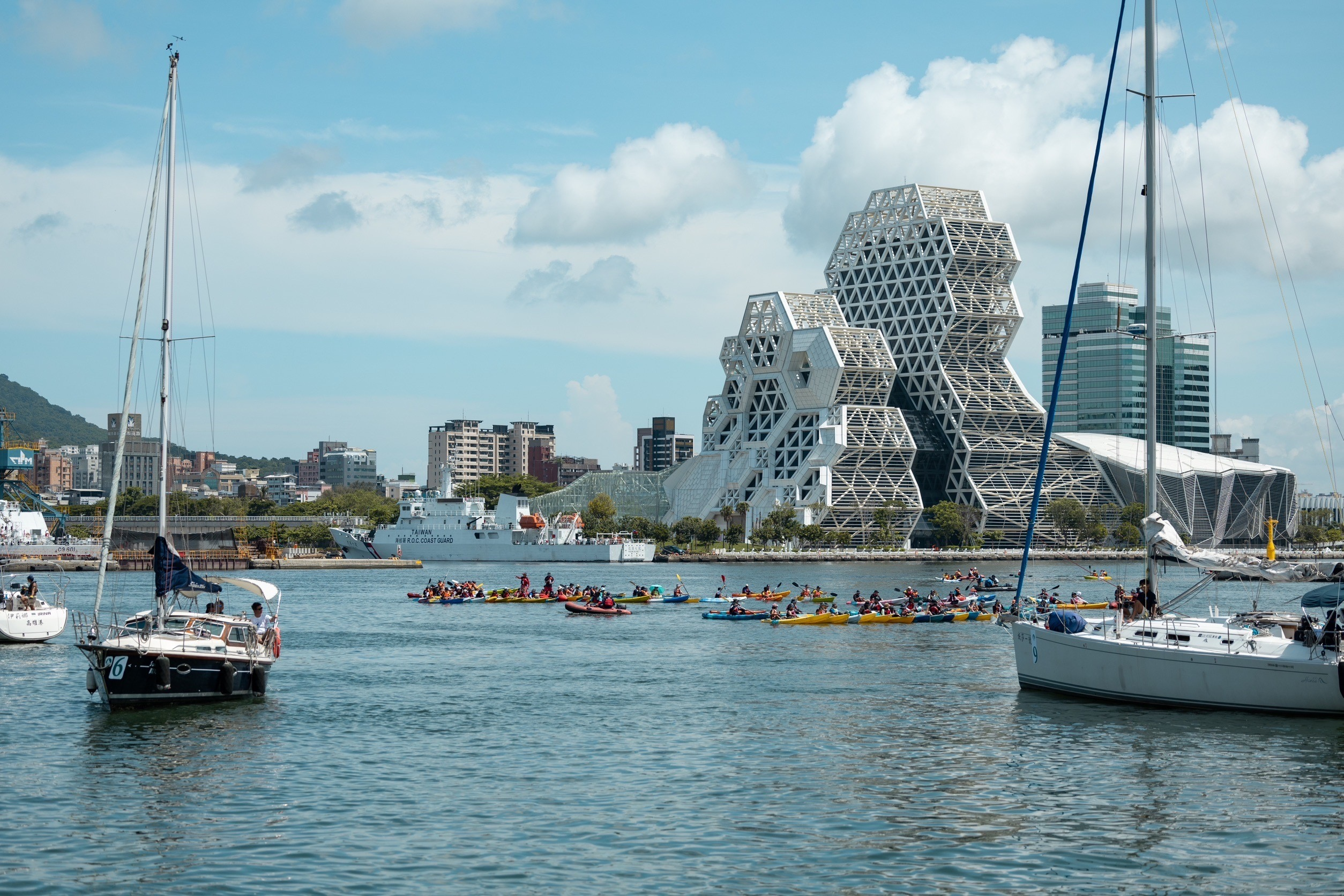
Kaohsiung Music Center from the water

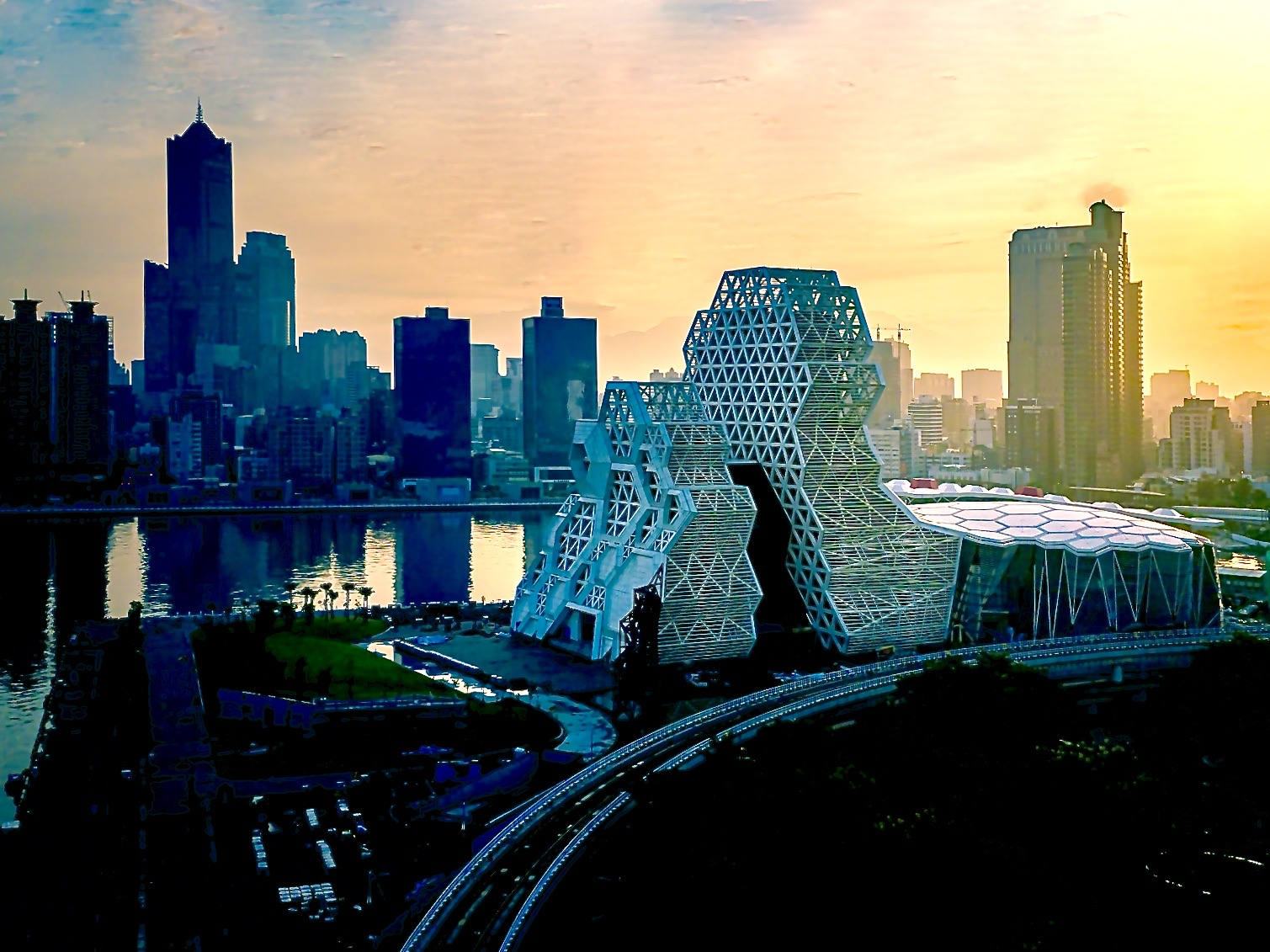
Kaohsiung sunset skyline 2019

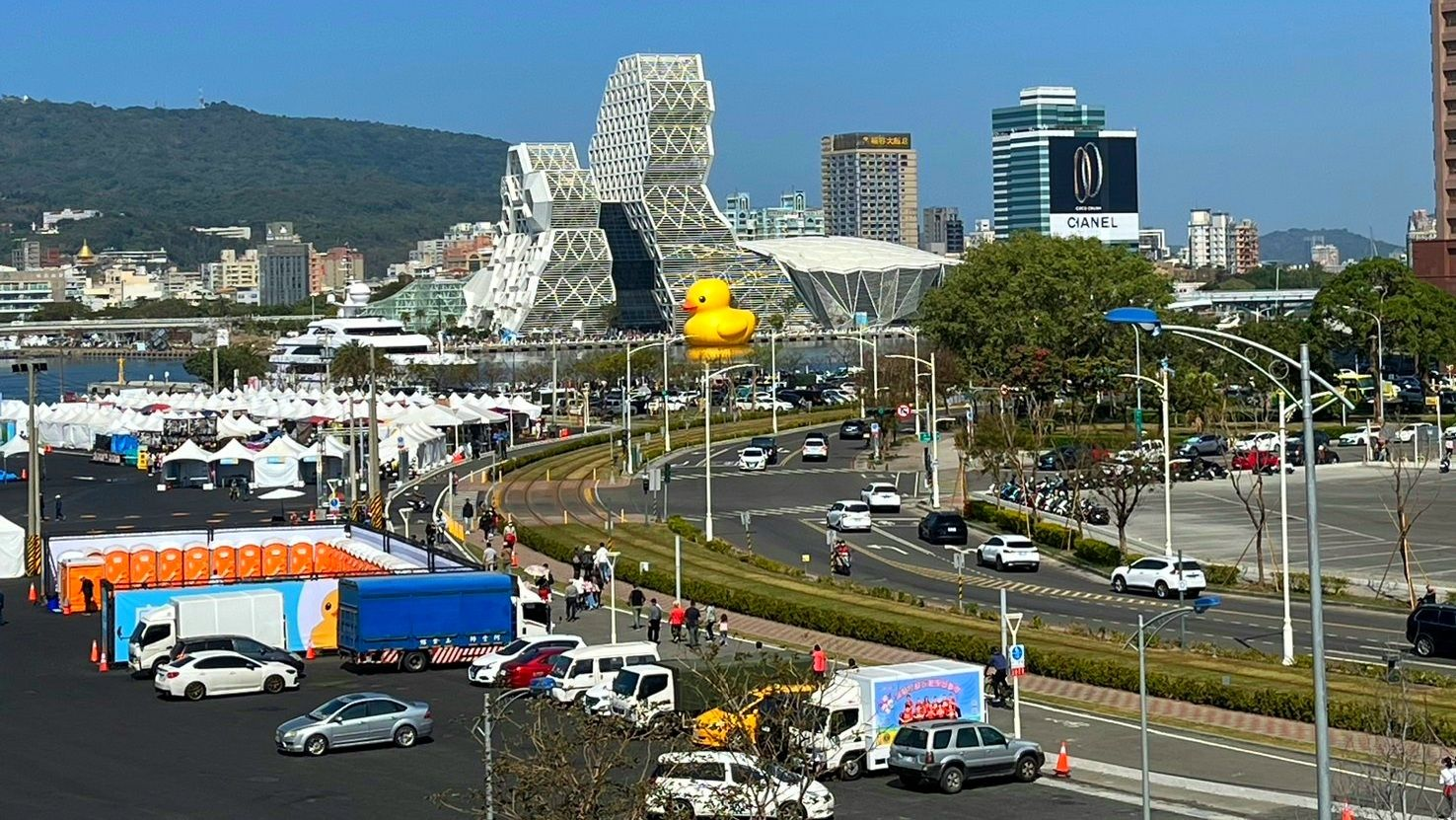
2024-Kaohsiung Music Center and Rubber Duck

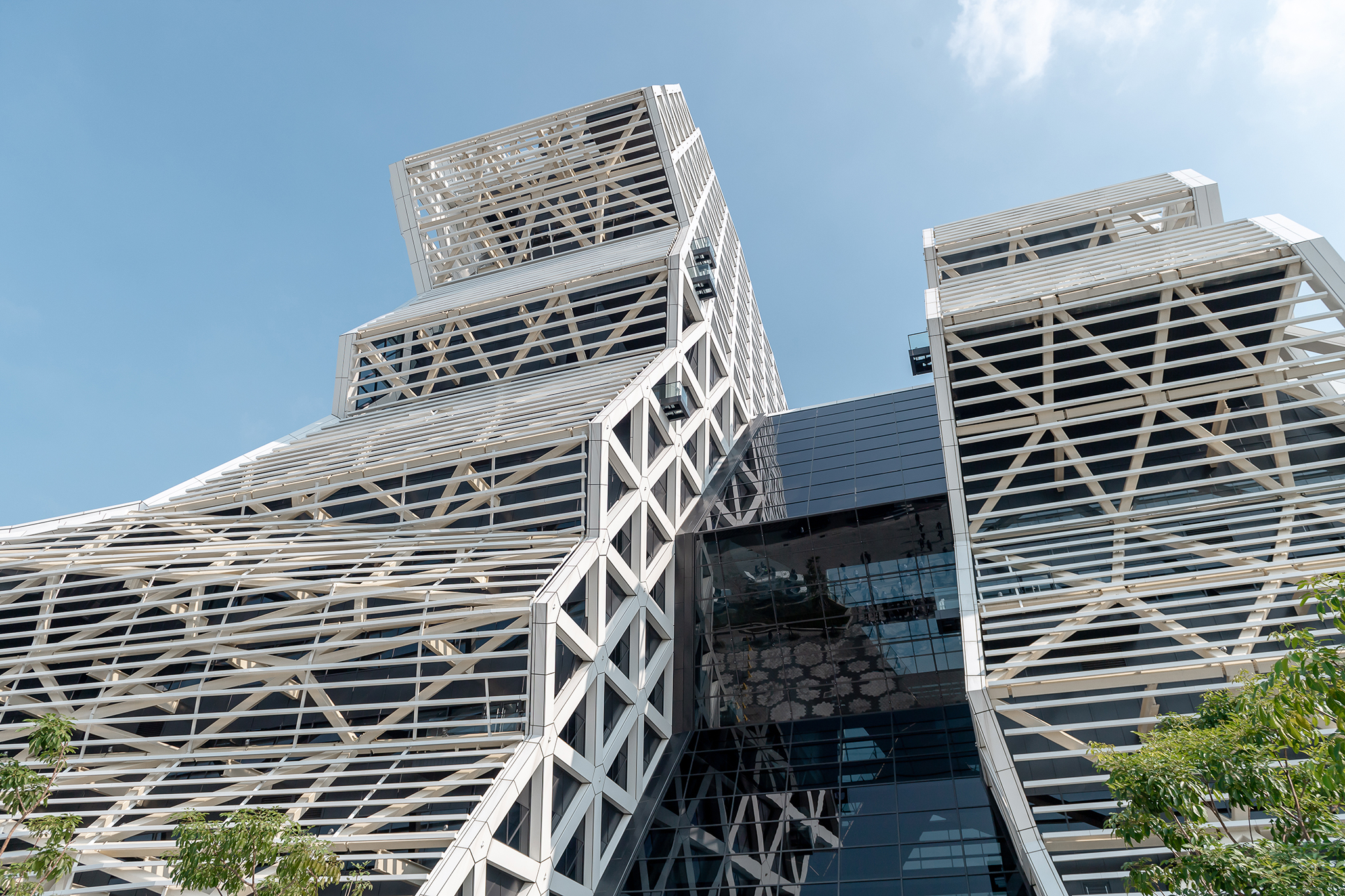
Exterior close up

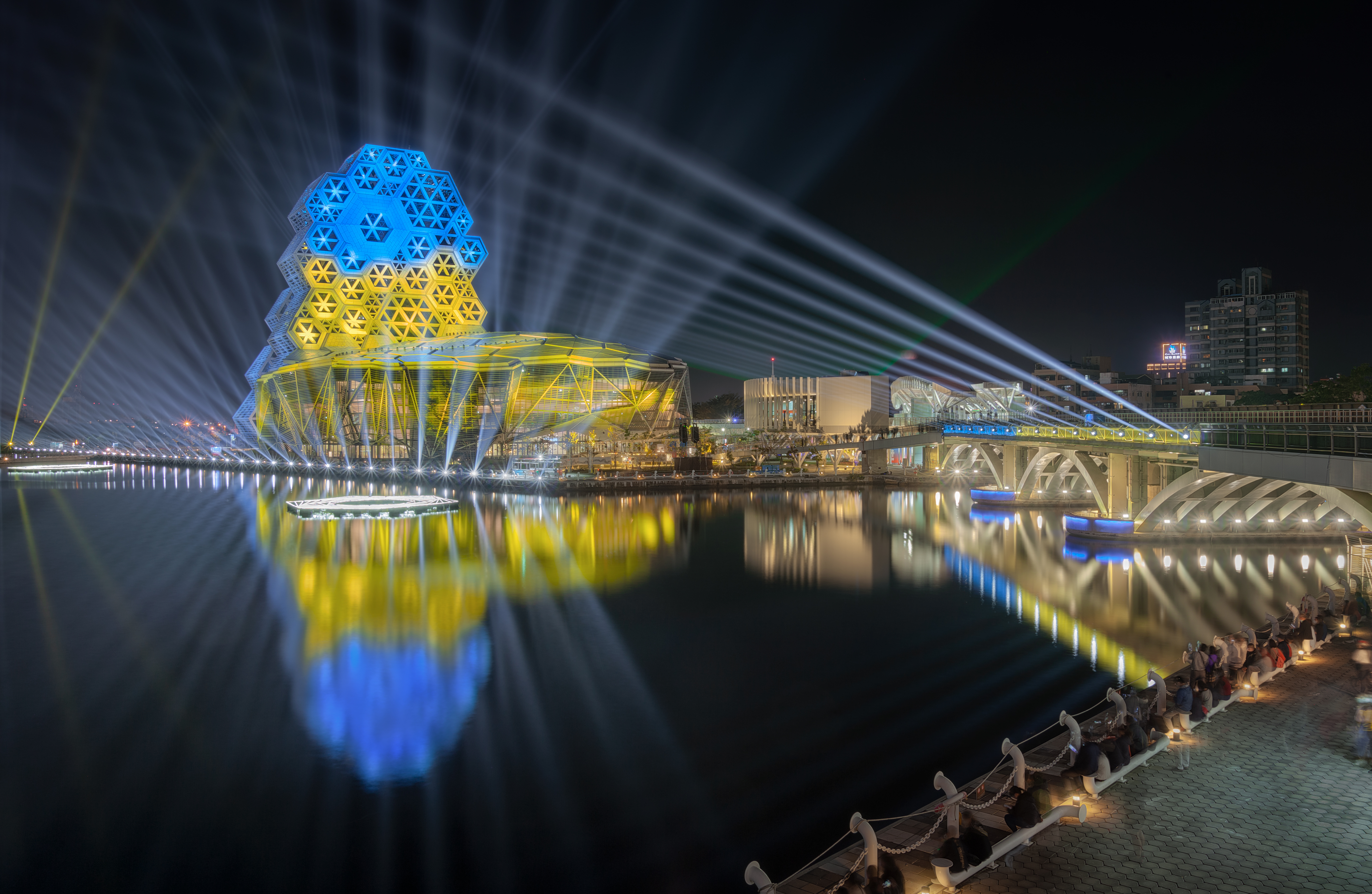
Kaohsiung Music Center and Lingyaliao Railroad Bridge lit with Ukrainian flag colors during 2022 Taiwan Lantern Festival

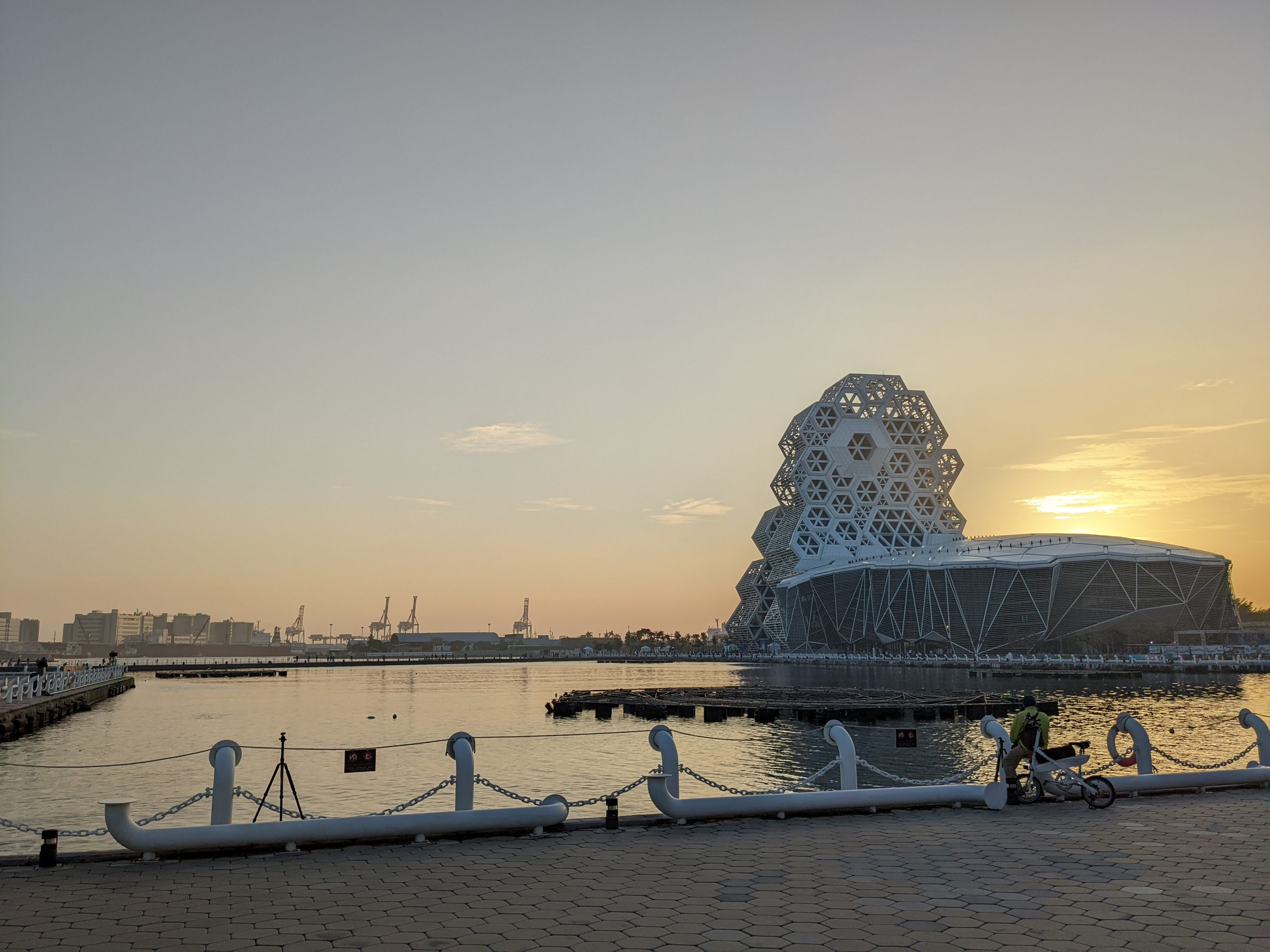
Kaohsiung Music Center with sunset photographed from Glory Pier

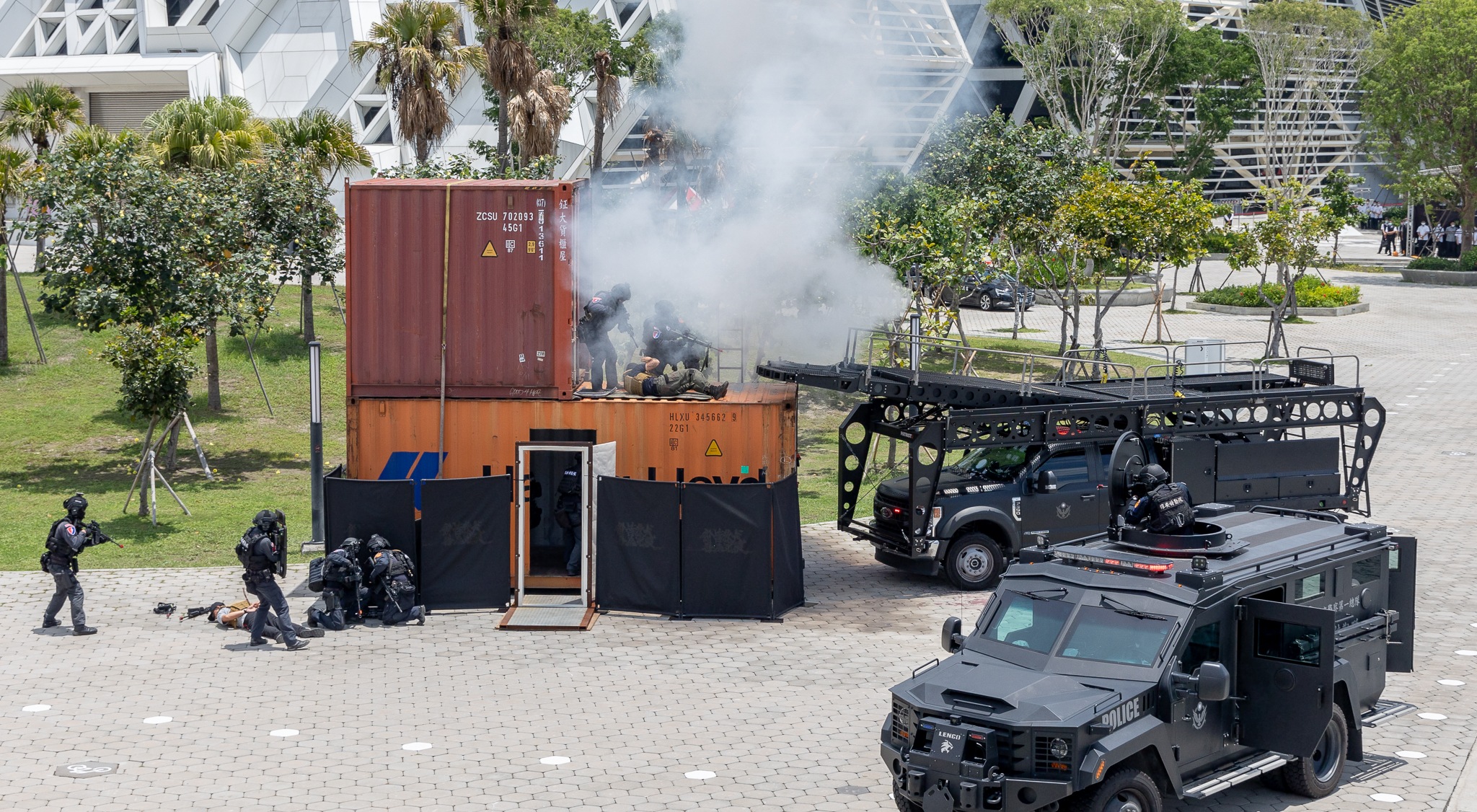
Counterterrorism drill in 2023

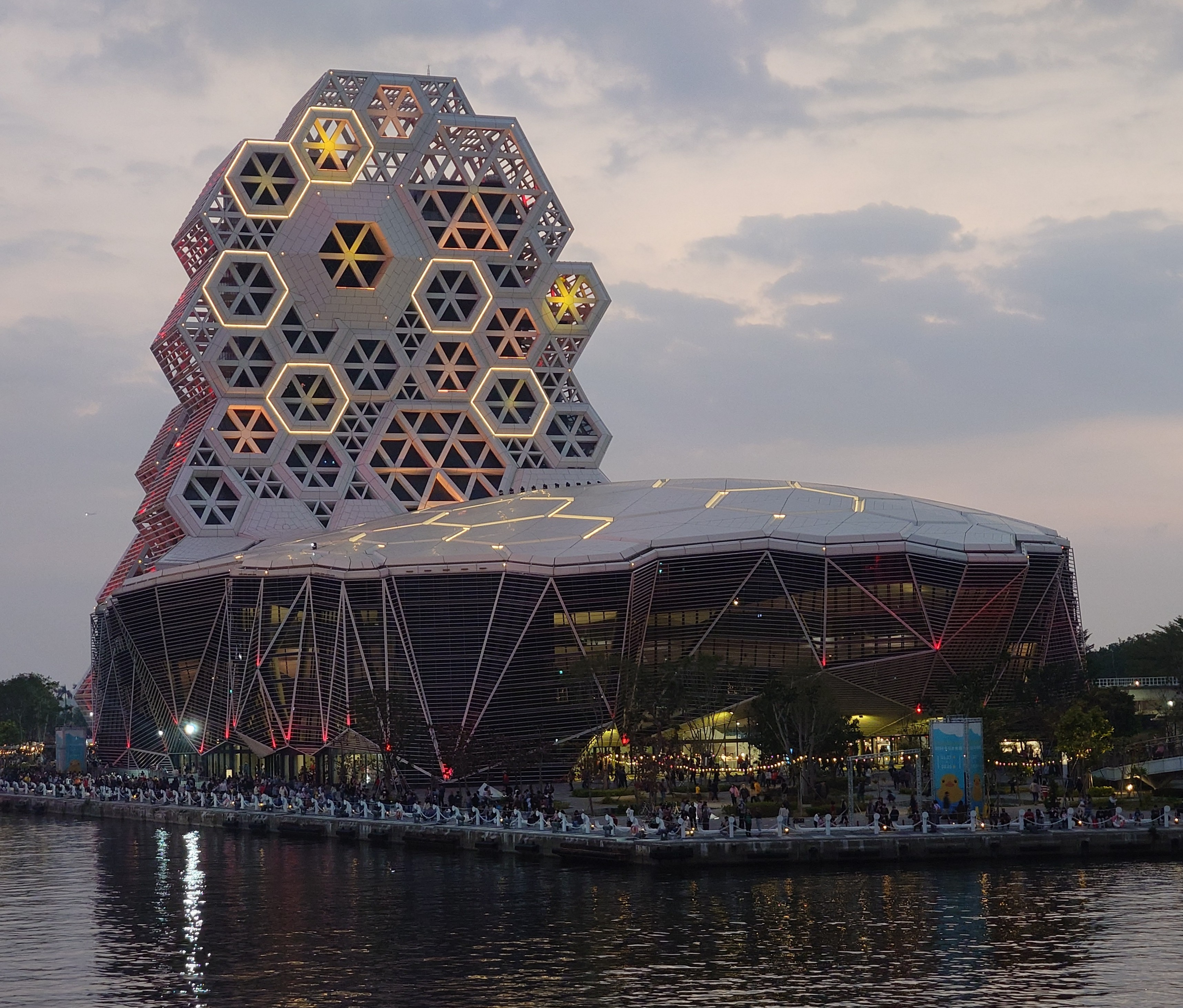
Kaohsiung Music Center at dusk in 2024

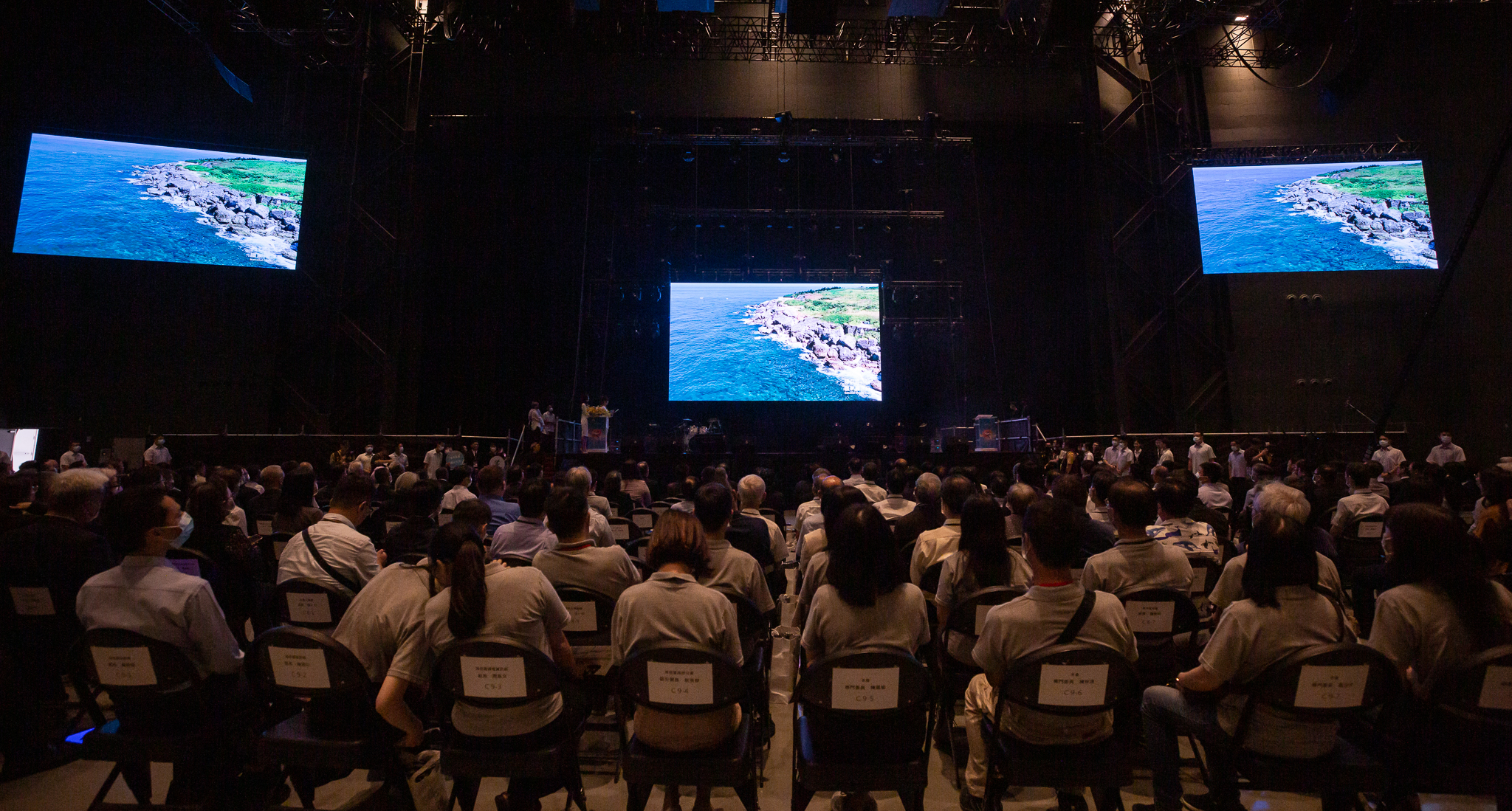
Interior

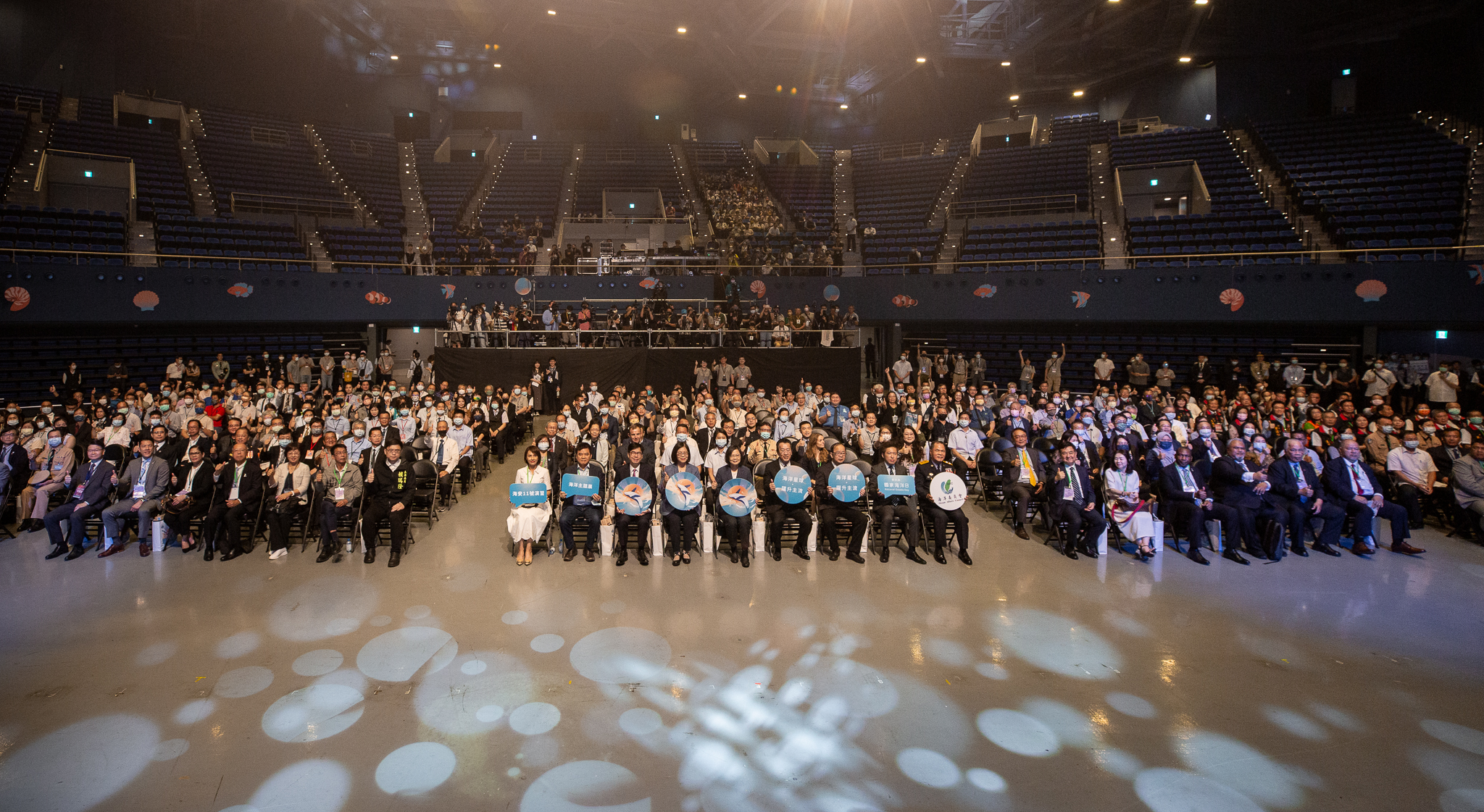
Interior

== See also ==
- List of tourist attractions in Taiwan
- National Kaohsiung Center for the Arts
- Taiwanese art
- Taiwanese music
