= Cruise Terminal light rail station =

Light rail station in Kaohsiung, Taiwan

Coordinates: 22.6116°N 120.2934°E

Cruise Terminal C9 旅運中心站
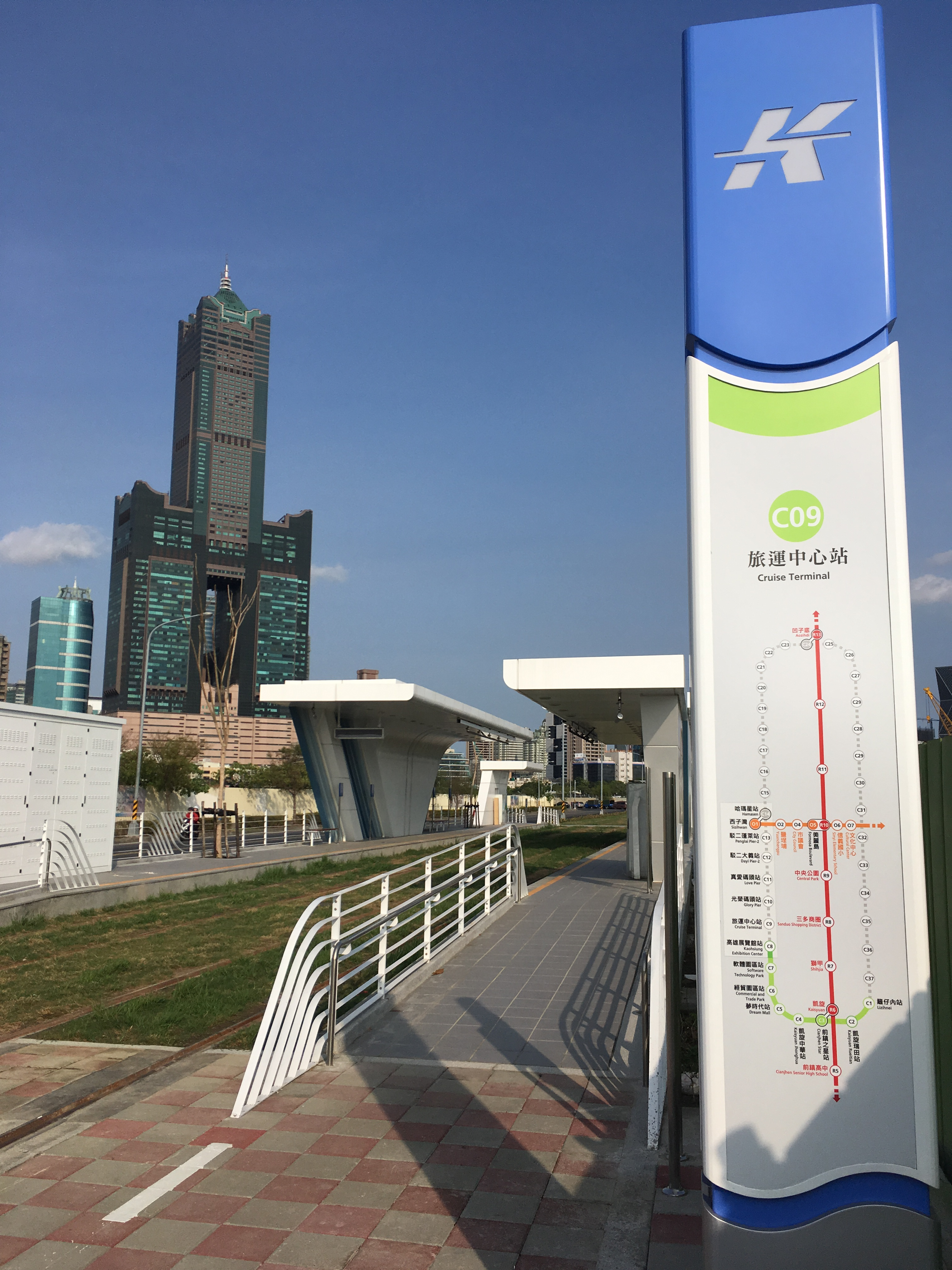

General information
- Location: Lingya, Kaohsiung; Taiwan
- Operated by: Kaohsiung Rapid Transit Corporation
- Line: Circular line
- Platforms: 2 side platforms
- Connections: Bus stop

Construction
- Structure type: At-grade
- Accessible: Yes

Other information
- Station code: C9

History
- Opened: October 16, 2015

Services
Preceding station	Kaohsiung Metro	Following station
Kaohsiung Exhibition Center outer loop / anticlockwise	Circular light rail	Glory Pier inner loop / clockwise
Location

Cruise Terminal (Chinese: 旅運中心站; pinyin: Lǚyùn Zhōngxīn) is a light rail station of the Circular Line of the Kaohsiung rapid transit system. It is located in Lingya District, Kaohsiung, Taiwan. It will be a future transfer station with the Yellow line.

== Station overview ==
This is a street-level station with two side platforms. It is located at the junction of Lingnancian Road and Haibian Road.

== Station layout ==
Street level	Side platform
Street level	← Circular light rail toward Hamasen (Glory Pier)
Street level	→ Circular light rail toward Lizihnei (Kaohsiung Exhibition Center)
Street level	Side platform

== Around the station ==
- Kaohsiung Port Cruise Terminal
- Kaohsiung Harbor Piers 17 to 20
- Chen Jhong-he Memorial Hall
