= Love River =

River in Kaohsiung, Taiwan

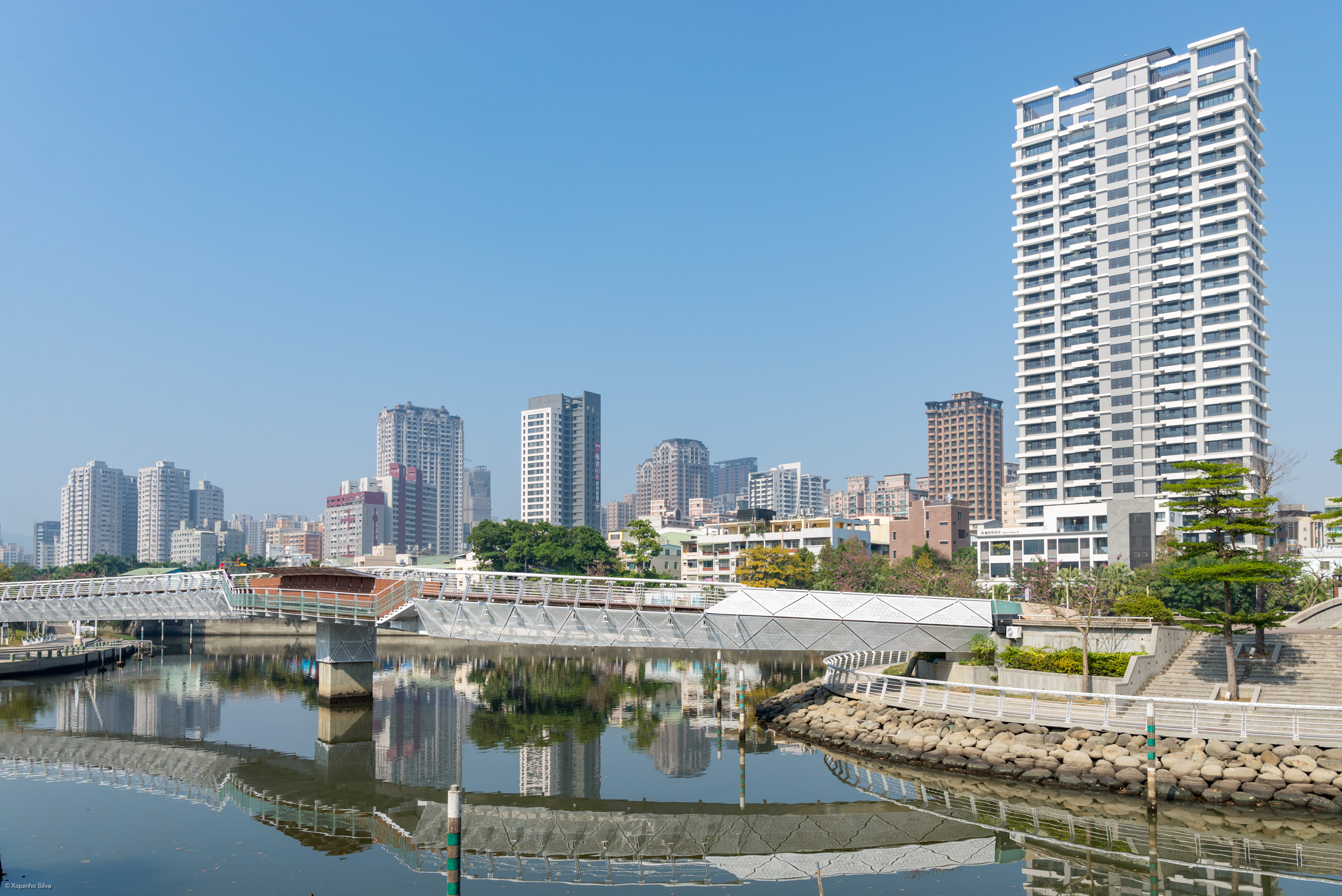
- Love River in downtown Kaohsiung
- Native name: Ai He (Chinese)

Location
- Country: Taiwan
- City: Kaohsiung

Physical characteristics
- Source
  - location: Renwu District, Kaohsiung City
- Mouth: Taiwan Strait
  - location: Kaohsiung
  - coordinates: 22°37′25″N 120°17′23″E
  - elevation: 0 ft (0 m)
- Length: 7.46 mi (12.01 km)
- Basin size: 21.62 mi^{2} (56.0 km^{2})
- Discharge
  - location: Kaohsiung Harbor

Basin features
- Tributaries
  - left: Houbi Channel
  - right: Ta Kang Creek

The Love River (simplified Chinese: 爱河; traditional Chinese: 愛河; pinyin: Ài Hé; Pe̍h-ōe-jī: Ài-hô) is a river in southern Taiwan. It originates in Renwu District, Kaohsiung City, and flows 12 kilometers (7.5 mi) through Kaohsiung to Kaohsiung Harbor. The Love River plays an important role in the city's economy and tourism. A riverside park, the Love River Park, runs along the riverbank in downtown Kaohsiung City. A night market operates in the park, and there are outdoor cafés, often with live bands. The scenery is enhanced by structures near the river, such as the Holy Rosary Cathedral, Kaohsiung Bridge, and the Kaohsiung District Court. Cultural events such as concerts and the Lantern Festival are held by the river.

The Love River was once heavily polluted, when raw sewage and industrial waste water flowed into it untreated. Efforts by the city government to divert the waste water to the treatment plant in Cijin District resulted in significantly improved water quality. The Love River is used for sightseeing, and there are boats and gondola rides for visitors. In 2018, mayor Han Kuo-yu proposed that a ferris wheel be built on the bank of the Love River.

== History ==
Before the urban development of the area, the river flowed in a wide and flat channel, used for irrigation and surrounded by farms. During the Qing dynasty, it was called the Takao River. In 1895, the Japanese dredged the river and turned it into a canal to transport lumber from Southeast Asia. Embankments (levees) were built, and in 1908, Kaohsiung Harbor was constructed at the mouth of the river, replacing the mangrove forests. In 1945, Taiwan fell under the control of the Republic of China, and the riversides became parks. As the country's economy switched from agricultural to industrial, the river became increasingly polluted. Urbanization created more waste, and in 1965, raw sewage began to flow into the river when an export processing zone was created.

=== Treatment ===
In 1979, the government began to clean the river, which was black and had a sewer-like odor. A set of floodgates were built to capture trash and sewage and send it to a treatment plant. In July 2002, the Kaohsiung City Government announced that the river had been completely cleaned up.

== Name ==
The watercourse was originally called the Takao River, from the Makatao people of the Pingpu tribe, and later the Kaohsiung River. In the late 1940s, the name Love River came into popular usage after a pair of lovers died by suicide in its depths. Also, after the KMT took over Taiwan, tourists began to gather around a newly built riverside park. Boat companies started operating on the water, with one of them named Love River Cruise. However, a typhoon blew off the signboard of the shop, with only the first two characters, "Love River", remaining.

In 1968, then-Kaohsiung mayor, Yang Chin-hu, unsuccessfully tried to have the waterway renamed Jen Ai River, to commemorate the birthday of Chiang Kai-Shek.

Love River was designated the official name in 1972.

== Tributaries ==
- Ta Kang Creek
- Houbi Channel

== Events ==
=== Dragon Boat Festival ===
Kaohsiung's annual Dragon Boat Festival is held on the Love River.

=== Kaohsiung World Games ===
During the 2009 World Games, held in Kaohsiung, the dragon boat race took place on the Love River.

=== 2018 Kaohsiung mayor's inauguration ceremony ===
On 24 November 2018, the KMT mayoral candidate Han Kuo-yu was elected mayor of Kaohsiung. On 25 December, an inauguration ceremony was held on the banks of the Love River.

== Gallery ==
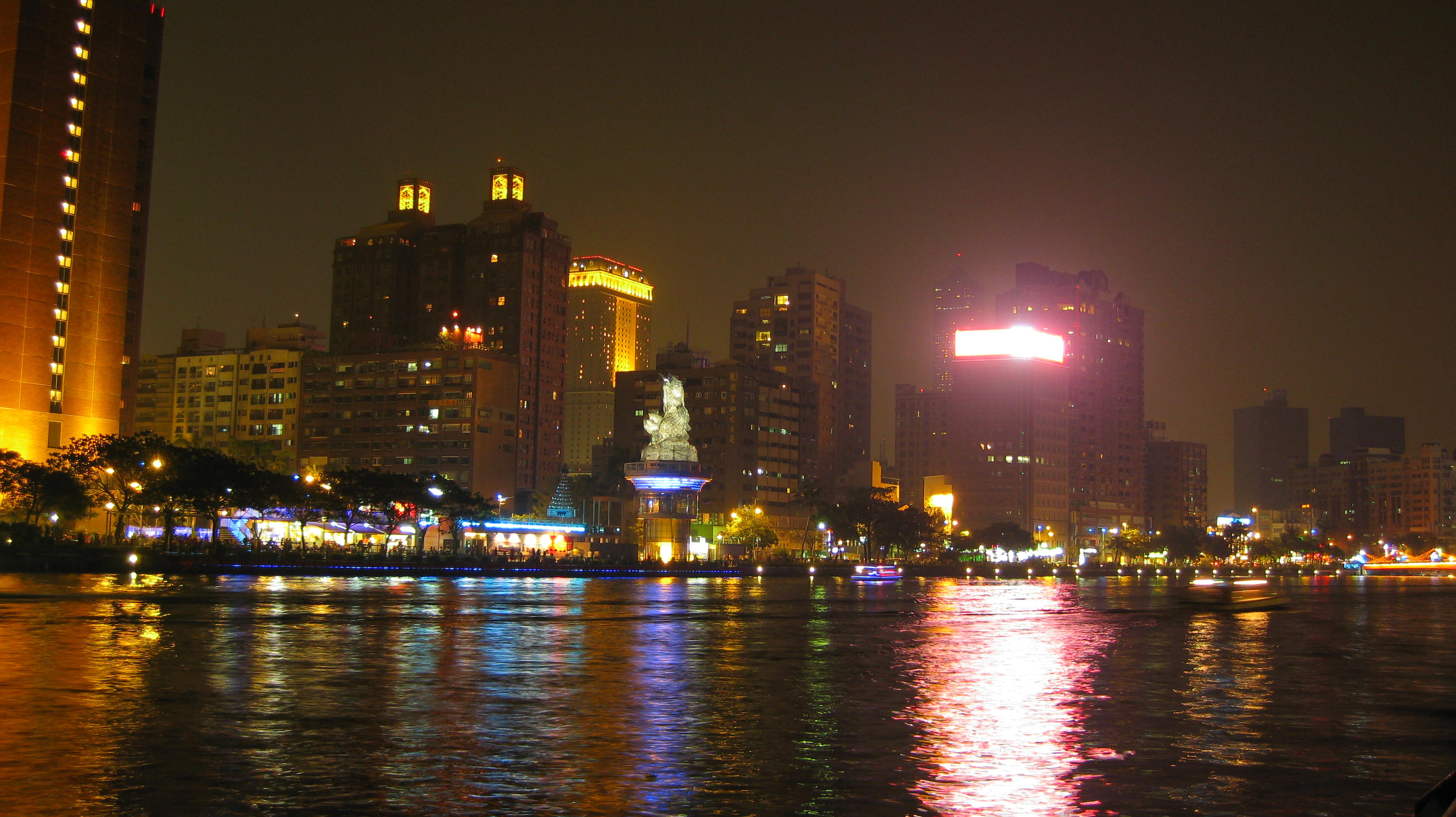
Kaohsiung night view along the Love River

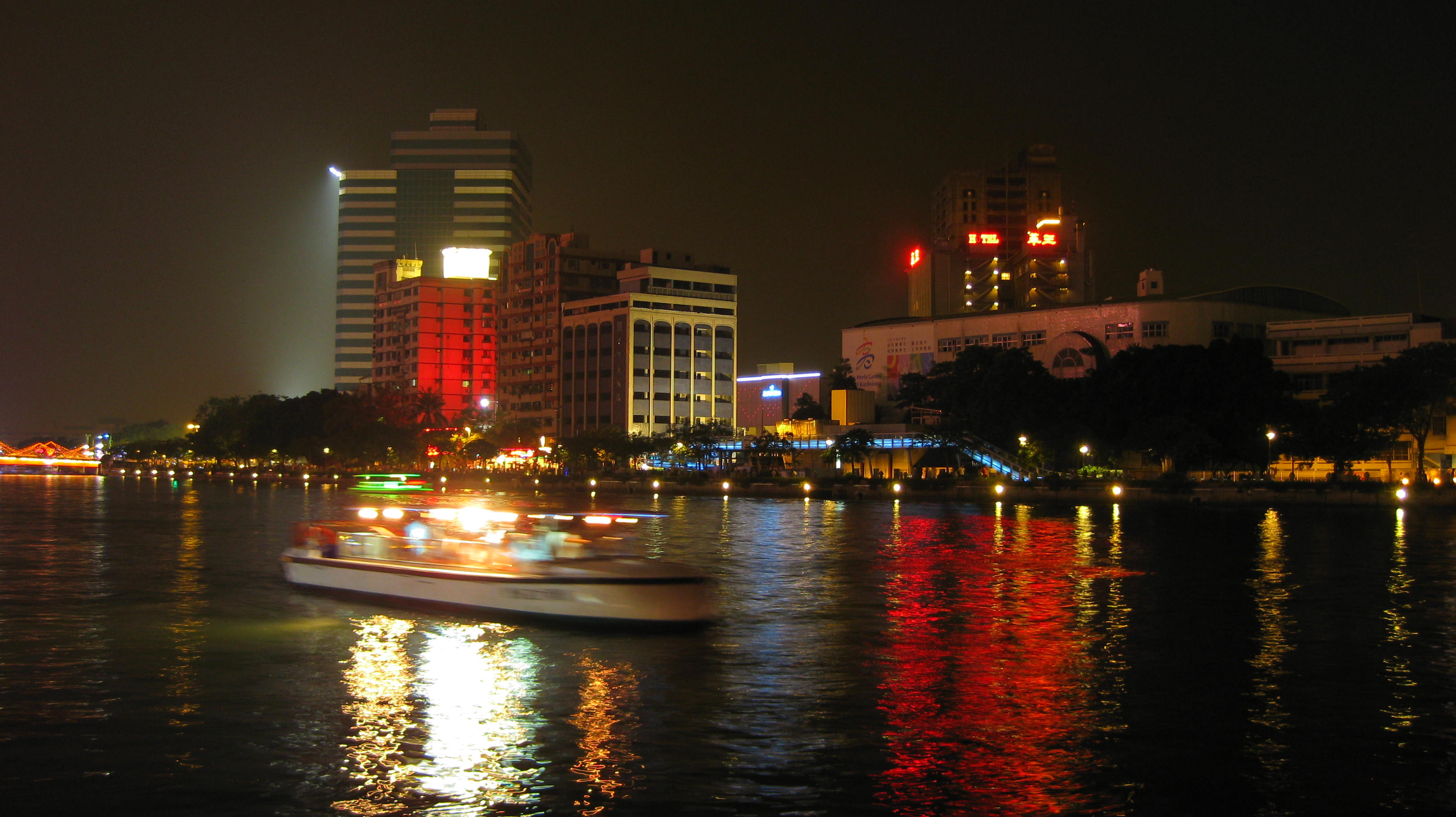
Ferry ride on the Love River

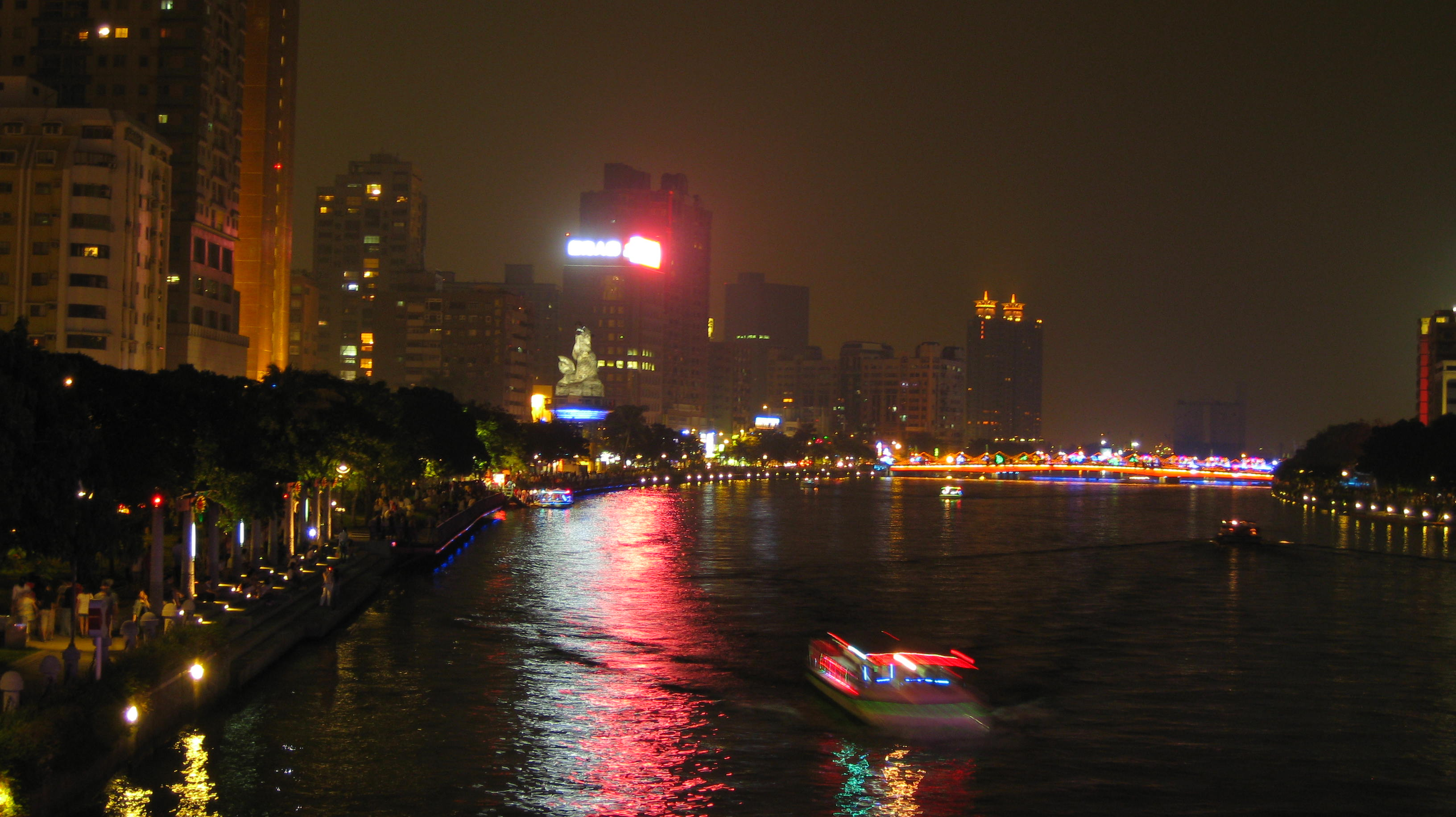
View of the river from Jhongjheng Bridge

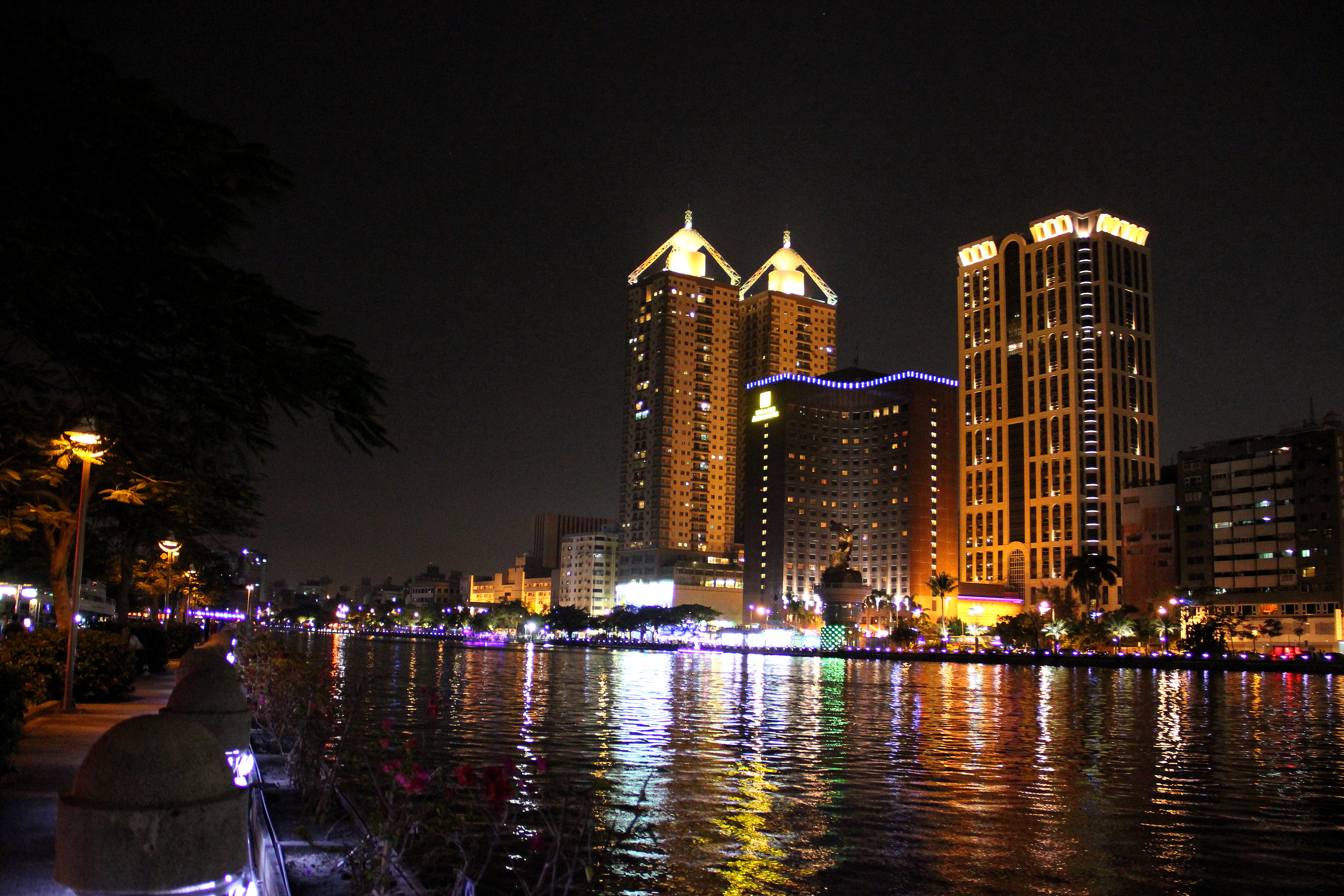
Night view

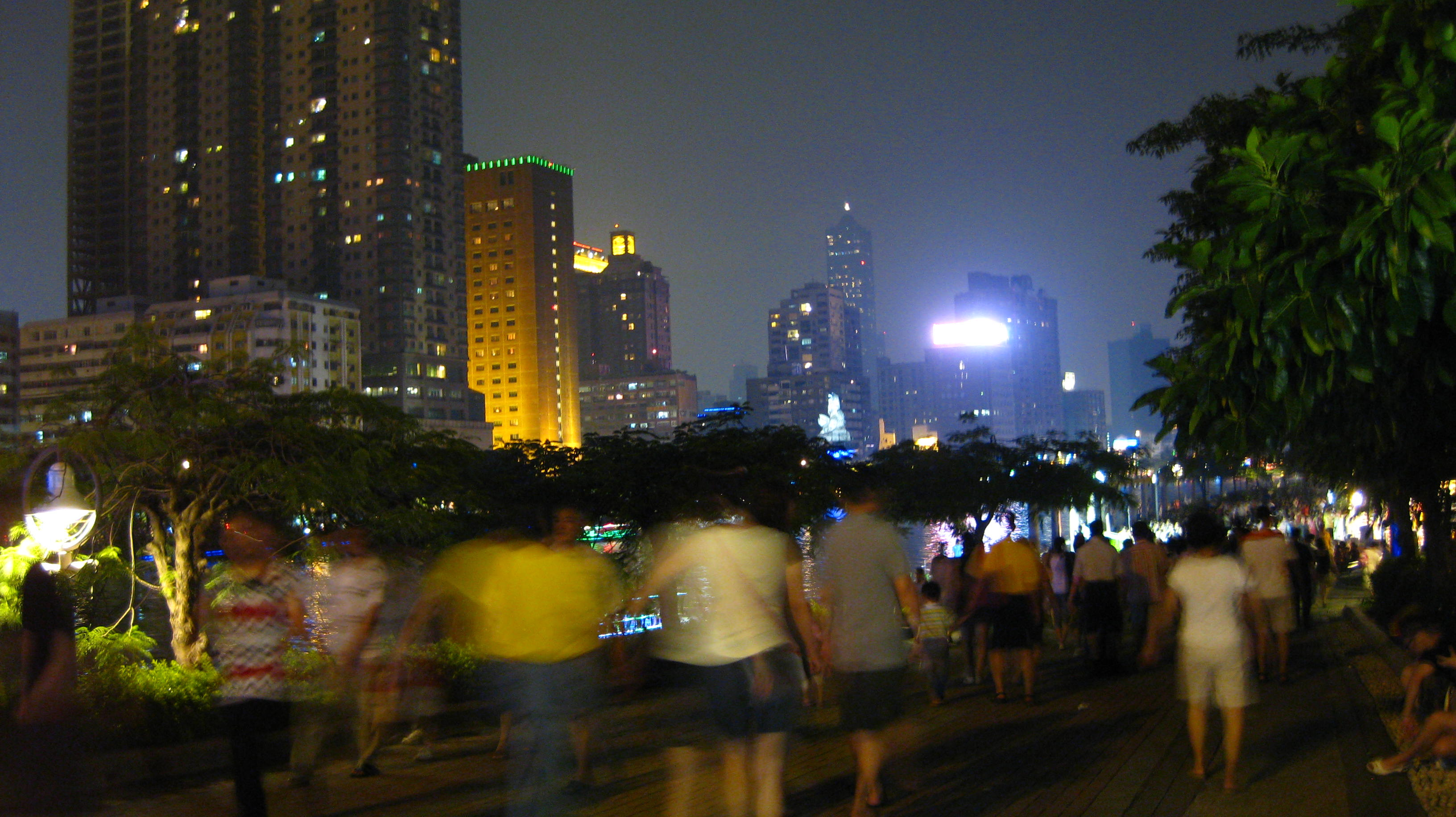
Hesi Road at night

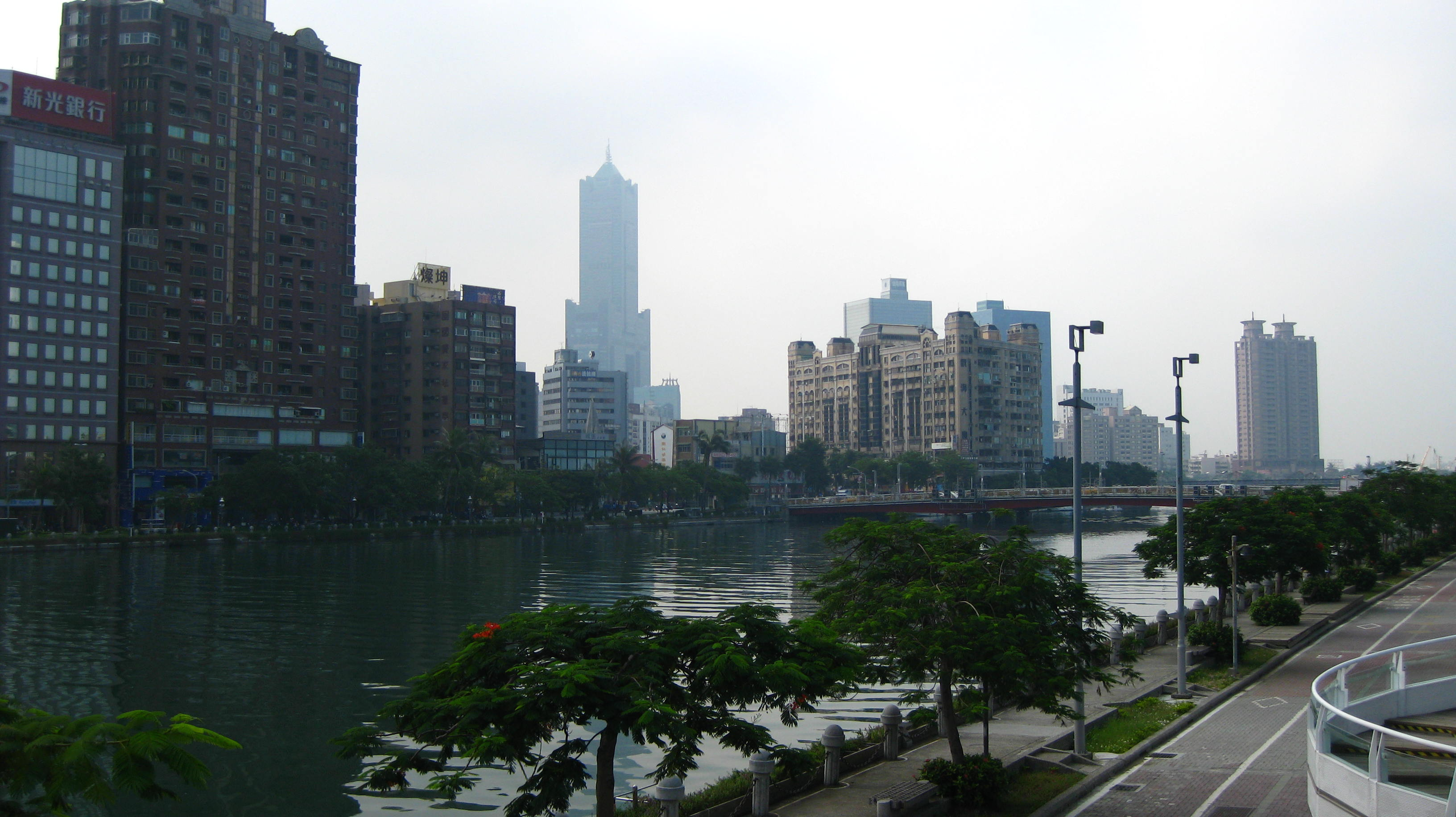
Hesi Road, early morning

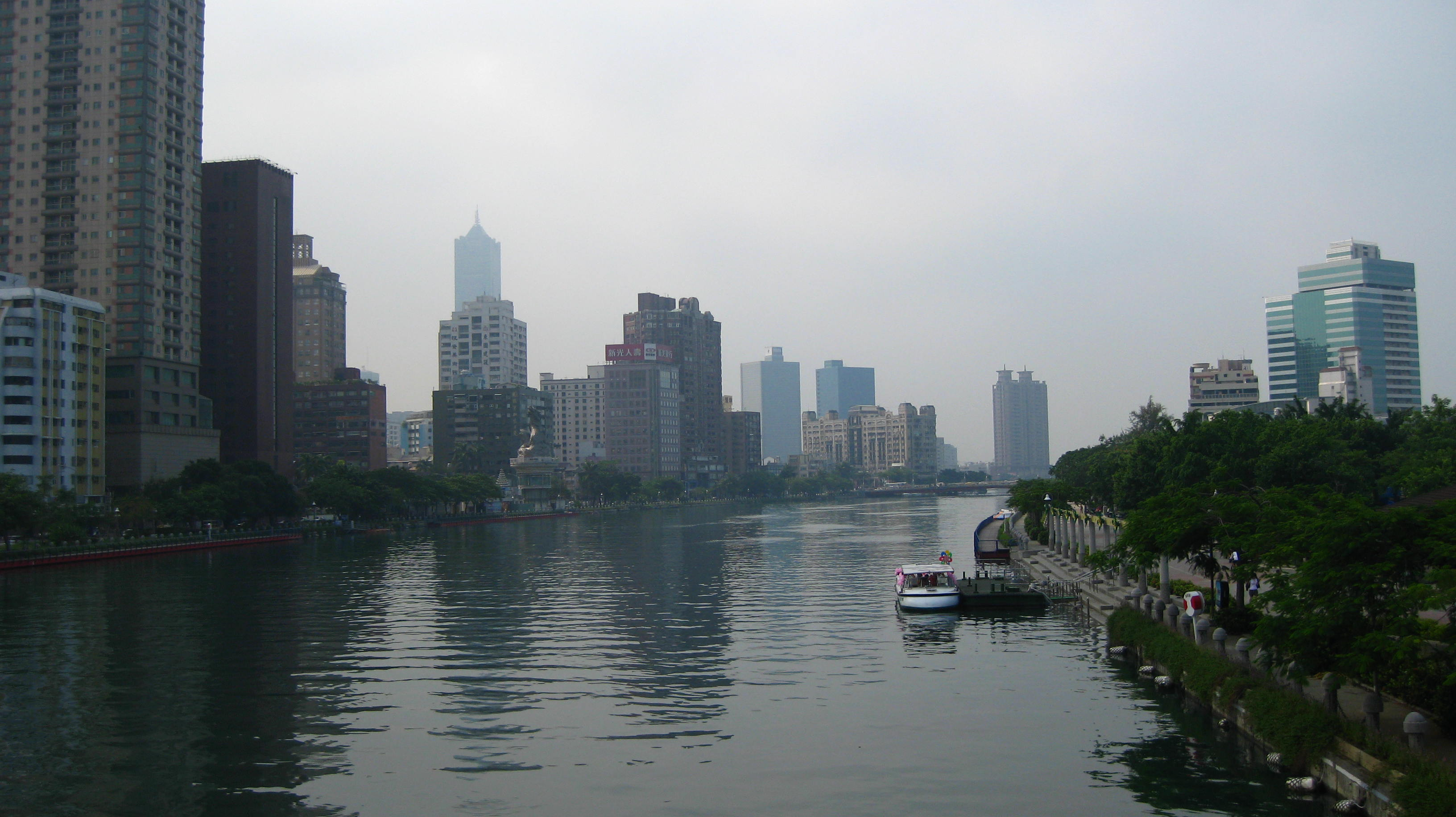
Love River, early morning

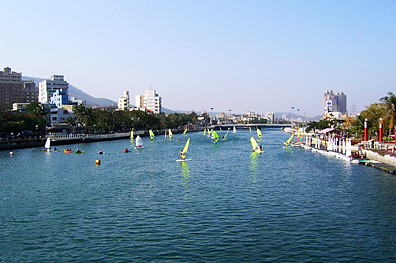
Sailboats on the Love River
