= Kaohsiung Twin Towers =

Residential twin skyscrapers in Qianjin, Kaohsiung, Taiwan

Kaohsiung Twin Towers 夢萊茵
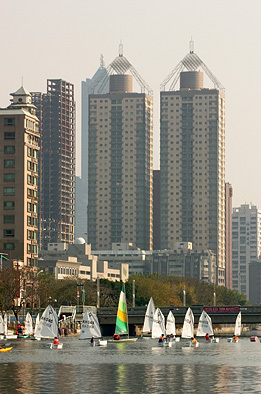
- Interactive map of the Kaohsiung Twin Towers 夢萊茵 area

General information
- Status: Completed
- Type: Residential
- Location: No.176, Hedong Road, Qianjin District, Kaohsiung, Taiwan
- Coordinates: 22°37′29″N 120°17′25″E
- Construction started: 1993
- Completed: 1996

Height
- Architectural: 142 m (466 ft)
- Roof: 128 m (420 ft)

Technical details
- Floor count: 35
- Floor area: 52,628.4 m^{2} (566,487 sq ft)

Design and construction
- Architect: Liu Architects

The Kaohsiung Twin Towers, also known as Illuna Towers (Chinese: 夢萊茵), is a complex of twin residential skyscrapers completed in 1996 and located in Qianjin District, Kaohsiung, Taiwan. The height of the buildings are 142 m (466 ft), comprising 35 floors above ground, with a floor area of 52,628.4 m^{2} (566,487 sq ft). As of February 2025, it is the 20th tallest building in Kaohsiung.

== See also ==
- List of tallest buildings in Taiwan
- List of tallest buildings in Kaohsiung
- Ba Ba - Central Park
- King's Town Hyatt
