= Next 100 =

Residential skyscraper in Qianzhen, Kaohsiung, Taiwan

Next 100 國城定潮
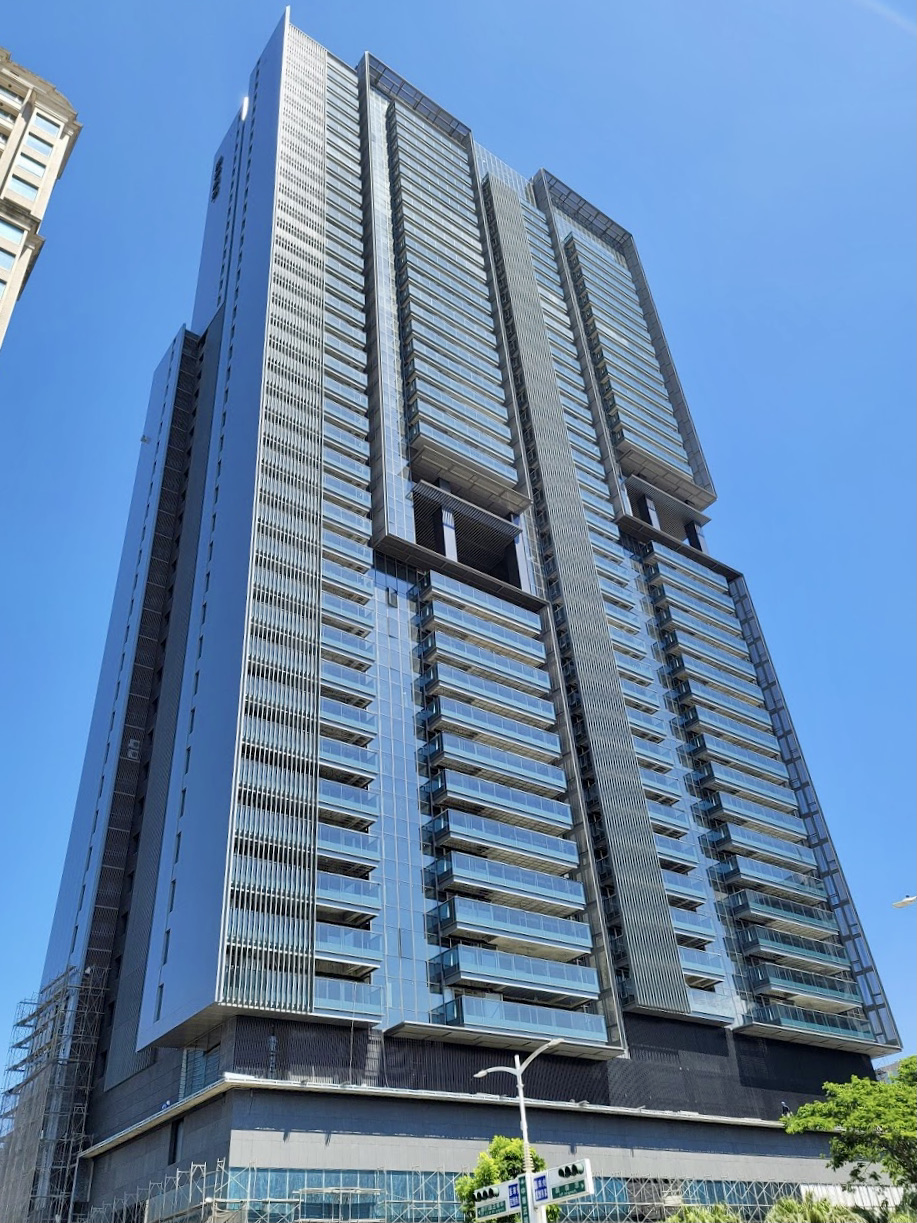
- Interactive map of the Next 100 國城定潮 area

General information
- Status: Completed
- Type: Residential
- Location: No. 66, Fuxing 3rd Road, Cianjhen District, Kaohsiung, Taiwan
- Coordinates: 22.60623390342924°N 120.30519409445593°E
- Construction started: 2015
- Completed: 2021

Height
- Architectural: 163 m (535 ft)

Technical details
- Floor count: 41
- Floor area: 83,014 m^{2} (893,560 sq ft)

Design and construction
- Architect: Soo K. Chan

The Next 100, also known as Kuo Cheng 2020, (Chinese: 國城定潮; pinyin: Guó chéng dìng cháo) is a residential skyscraper located in Cianjhen District, Kaohsiung, Taiwan. The height of the building is 163 m (535 ft), with a floor area of 83,014 m^{2} (893,560 sq ft), and it comprises 41 floors above ground, as well as four basement levels. Construction of the building began in 2015 and it was completed in 2021.

== Design ==
Designed by Singaporean architect Soo K. Chan, Next 100 offers 187 apartment units as well as 12 shops, with facilities including a lobby hall, reception room, library, banquet hall, community cinema, children's playroom, outdoor children's play area, chess room, KTV, starry sky bar and an indoor swimming pool. The building also houses two Michelin-starred restaurants: Japanese restaurant Den and French restaurant Liberté, which opened in December 2020.

== See also ==
- List of tallest buildings in Taiwan
- List of tallest buildings in Kaohsiung
- Kingtown King Park
