= Ba Ba - Central Park =

Skyscraper in Qianjin, Kaohsiung, Taiwan

- 巴巴中央花園
- Interactive map of the Ba Ba - Central Park area

General information
- Status: Completed
- Type: Residential
- Location: No.102, Zhonghua 3rd Road, Qianjin District, Kaohsiung, Taiwan
- Coordinates: 22.628951297373344°N 120.2964048975214°E
- Completed: 2015

Height
- Architectural: 144.4 metres (474 ft)

Technical details
- Floor count: 39

The Ba Ba - Central Park (Chinese: 巴巴中央花園; pinyin: Bābā zhōngyāng huāyuán) is a residential skyscraper located in Qianjin District, Kaohsiung, Taiwan. As of December 2020, it is the 15th tallest building in Kaohsiung. The height of the building is 144.4 m (474 ft), and it comprises 39 floors above ground, as well as seven basement levels. The building was completed in 2015.

The building is situated adjacent to the Central Park in Kaohsiung, providing residents with extensive green views and convenient access to public transportation, including three nearby metro stations. Its luxury amenities include a sky lounge, fitness facilities, and multipurpose communal spaces designed for high-end residential living.

== See also ==
- List of tallest buildings in Taiwan
- List of tallest buildings in Kaohsiung
- Guo-Yan Building BC
- Kingtown King Park
- Xin-Fu-Hwa
