= Sinyi Elementary School metro station =

Metro station in Kaohsiung, Taiwan

Sinyi Elementary School O6/Y11 信義國小
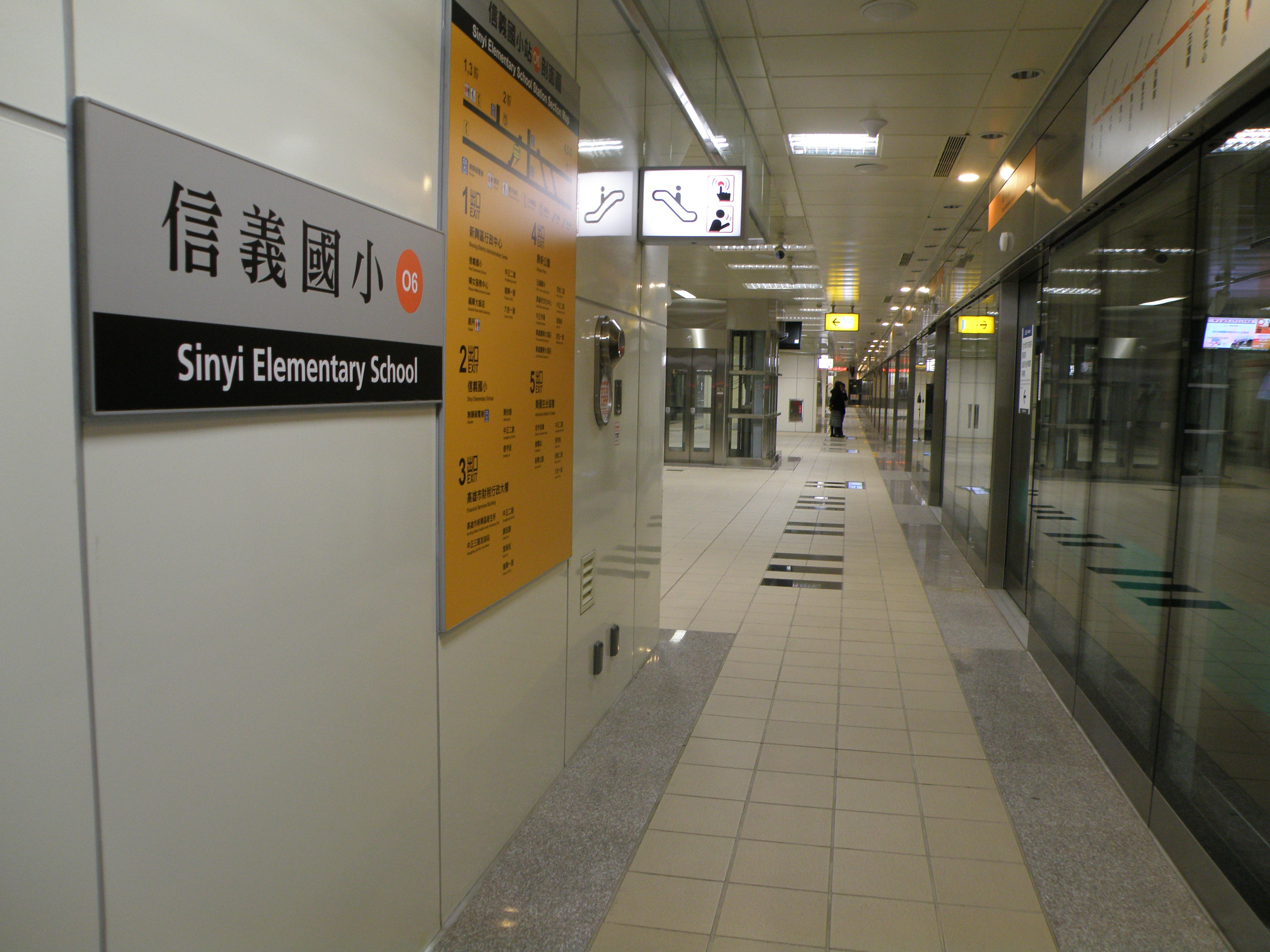
- Platform of Sinyi Elementary School station

General information
- Location: Sinsing, Kaohsiung; Taiwan
- Coordinates: 22°37′51″N 120°18′40″E
- Operated by: Kaohsiung Rapid Transit Corporation
- Line: Orange line (O6); Yellow line (Under Construction)
- Platforms: 1 island platform
- Connections: Bus stop

Construction
- Structure type: Underground
- Accessible: Yes

History
- Opened: 2008-09-14

Passengers
- 3,147 daily (Jan. 2011)

Services
Preceding station	Kaohsiung Metro	Following station
Formosa Boulevard towards Hamasen	Orange line	Cultural Center towards Daliao
Under Construction
Sihwei Administration Centre towards Cruise Terminal or Cianjhen Senior High School	Yellow line	Minzu towards Dipu
Location

Sinyi Elementary School metro station
- Traditional Chinese: 信義國小站
Transcriptions
Standard Mandarin
- Hanyu Pinyin: Xìnyì Guóxiaǒ Zhàn
- Bopomofo: ㄒㄧㄣˋ 一ˋ ㄍㄨㄛˊ ㄒㄧㄠˇ ㄓㄢˋ
- Wade–Giles: Hsin^{4}-yi^{4} Kuo^{2}hsiao^{3} Chan^{4}
- Tongyong Pinyin: Sìnyì Guósiaǒ Jhàn
Southern Min
- Tâi-lô: Sìn-gī kok-sió Tsām

Sinyi Elementary School is a station on the Orange line of Kaohsiung Metro in Sinsing District, Kaohsiung, Taiwan. It will be a future transfer station with the Yellow line.

== Station overview ==
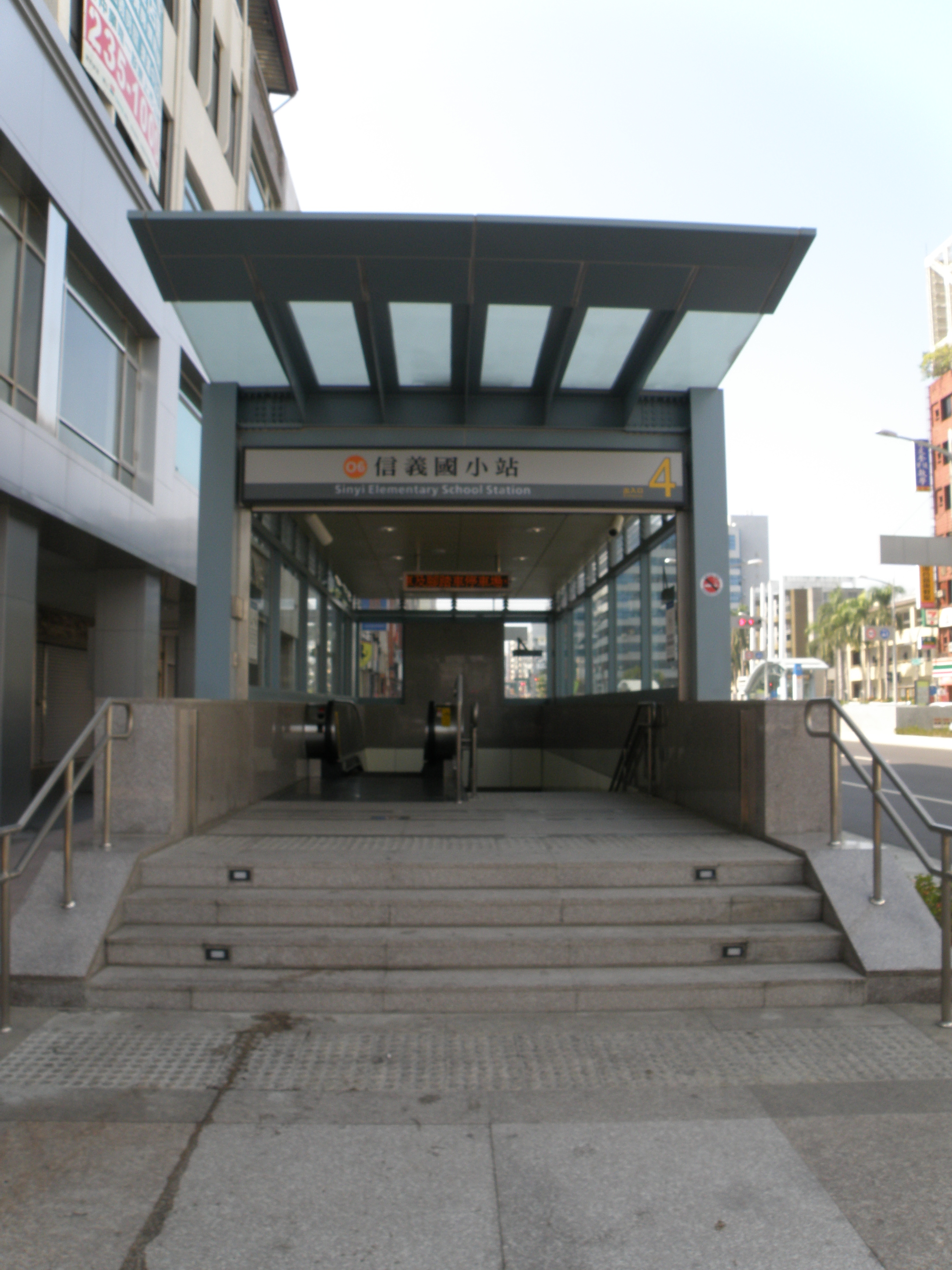
Exit 4 of Sinyi Elementary School station

This is a two-level, underground station with an island platform and five exits. The station is 215 meters long and is located at the intersection of Jhongjheng 2nd Rd. and Minzu 2nd Rd.

=== Station layout ===
Street level	Entrance/exit	Entrance/exit
B1	Concourse	Lobby, information desk, automatic ticket machines, one-way faregates, restrooms (near exit 1)
B2	Platform 1	← KMRT Orange Line toward Hamasen (Formosa Boulevard)
B2	Island platform, doors will open on the left
B2	Platform 2	KMRT Orange Line toward Daliao (Cultural Center) →

=== Exits ===
- Exit 1: Sinyi Elementary School (west), Jintian Rd., Sinsing District Administrative Center
- Exit 2: Sinyi Elementary School (east), Kaifeng Rd.
- Exit 3: Jintian Rd.,
- Exit 4: Minzu 2nd Rd., Dingsin Park
- Exit 5: Minzu 2nd Rd., Cathay Jhongjheng Building, Cafe Hondo

== Around the station ==
- Sinyi Elementary School
- Kaohsiung City Government Fire Department
- The Lees Hotel
- PEG Asia org / TC English Ltd.
- Woman Service Center of Social Affairs Bureau
- Cathay Jhongjheng Building
- Vepsi Tower
- Cafe Hondo
- Hong Fa Temple
- Water Tower Park
