= Cultural Center metro station =

Metro station in Kaohsiung, Taiwan

Cultural Center O7 文化中心
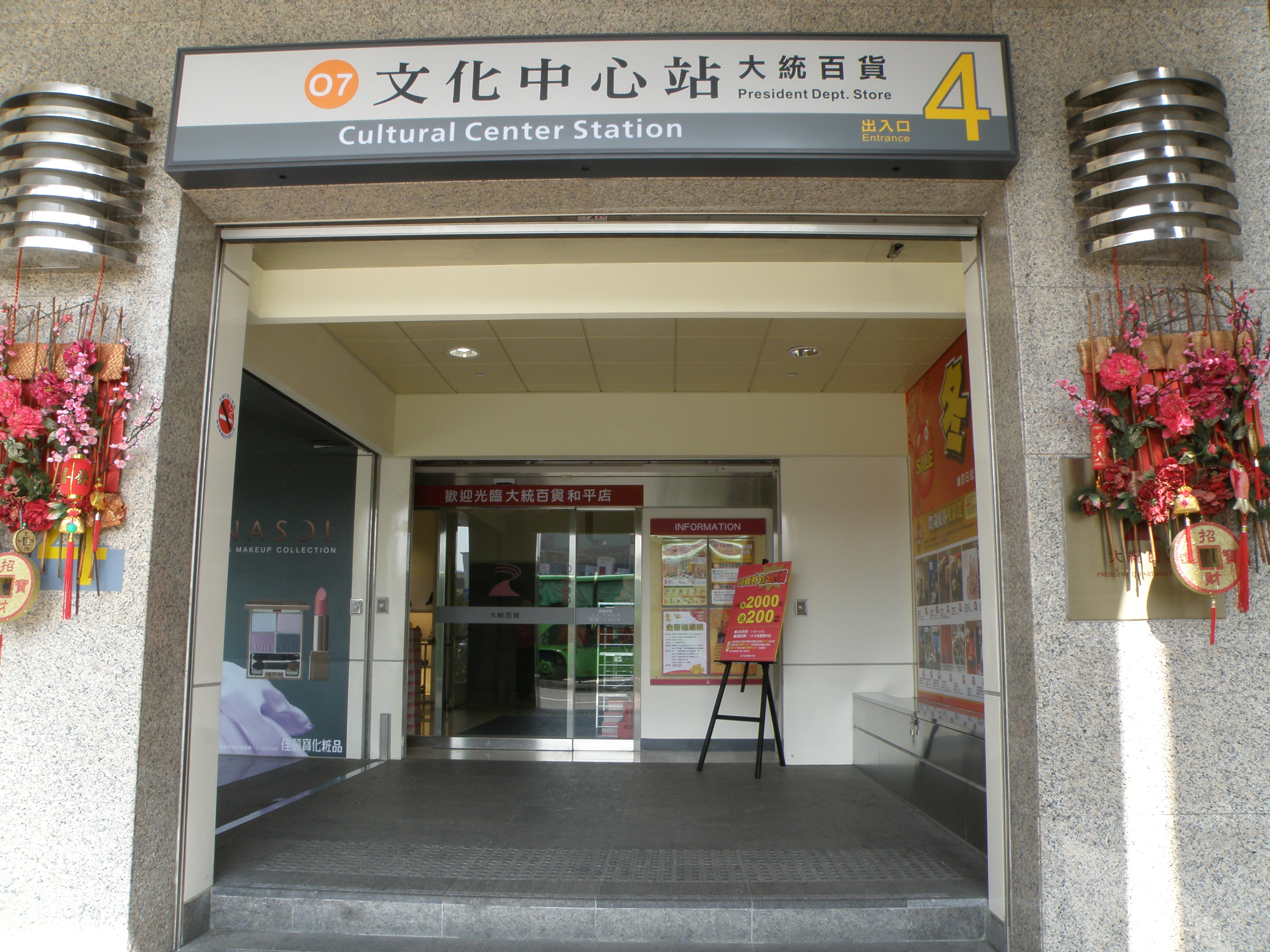
- Cultural Center station exit 4 (Note: The door in the middle of the picture is the entrance to the department store, and the escalator on the left leads to the MRT station.)

Chinese name
- Traditional Chinese: 文化中心車站
- Simplified Chinese: 文化中心车站
Transcriptions
Standard Mandarin
- Hanyu Pinyin: Wénhuà Zhōngxīn Chēzhàn
- Bopomofo: ㄨㄣˊ ㄏㄨㄚˋ ㄓㄨㄥ ㄒㄧㄣ ㄔㄜ ㄓㄢˋ
- Wade–Giles: Wên^{2}-hua^{4} Chung^{1}-hsin^{1} Ch'ê^{1}chan^{4}
- Tongyong Pinyin: Wúnhuà Jhongsin Chejhàn

General information
- Location: Sinsing and Lingya, Kaohsiung; Taiwan
- Coordinates: 22°37′49″N 120°19′03″E
- Operator: Kaohsiung Rapid Transit Corporation
- Line: Orange line (O7)
- Platforms: 1 island platform
- Connections: Bus stop

Construction
- Structure type: Underground

History
- Opened: 2008-09-14

Passengers
- 5,952 daily (Jan. 2011)

Services
Preceding station	Kaohsiung Metro	Following station
Sinyi Elementary School towards Hamasen	Orange line	Wukuaicuo towards Daliao
Location

Cultural Center is a station on the Orange line of Kaohsiung MRT on the edge of Sinsing District and Lingya District, Kaohsiung, Taiwan.

== Station overview ==
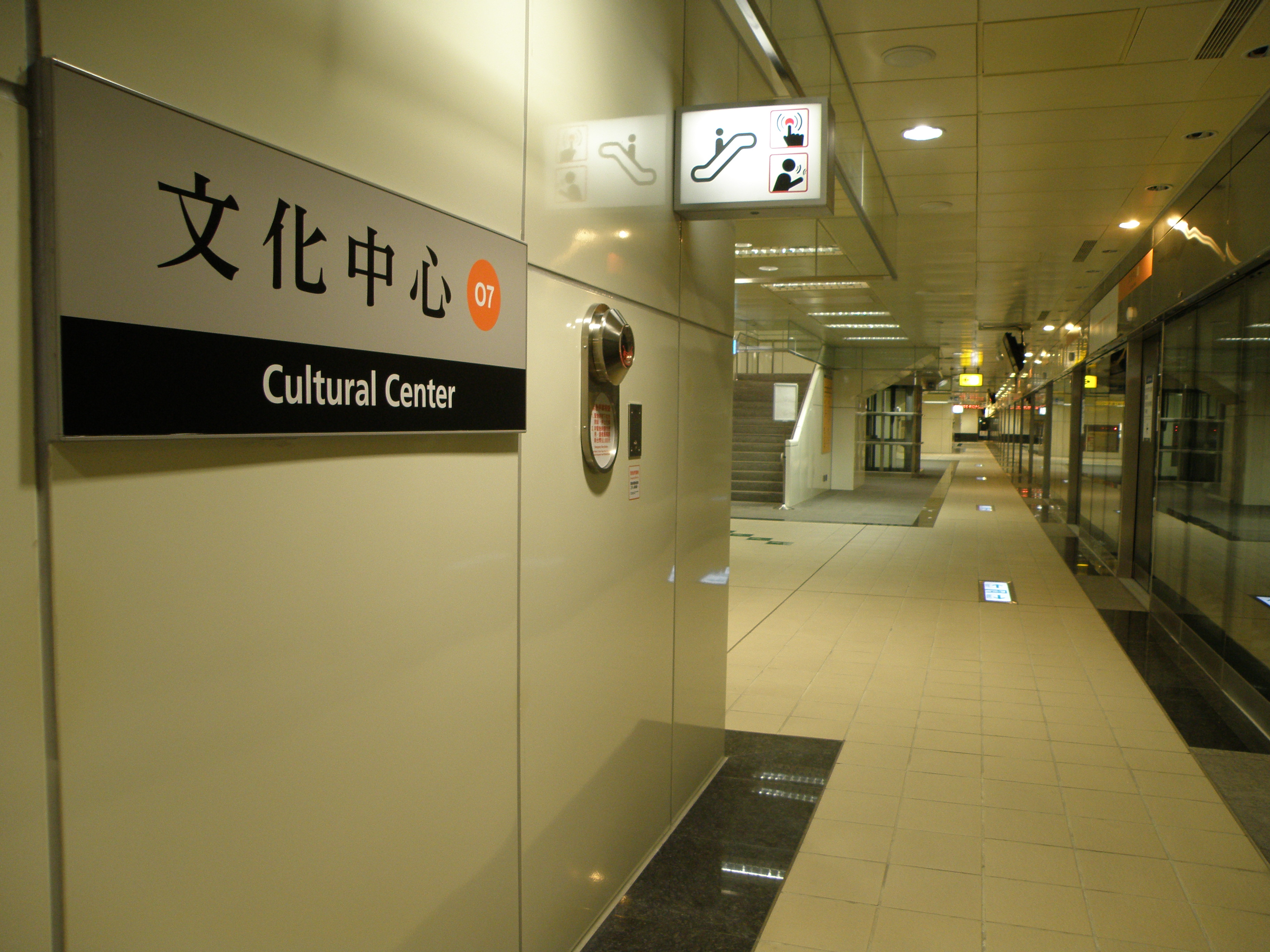
Cultural Center station platform

This is a two-level, underground station with an island platform and four exits. The station is 199 metres long and is located at the intersection Jhongjheng 2nd Rd and Heping 1st Rd.

=== Station layout ===
Street level	Entrance/exit	Entrance/exit
B1	Concourse	Lobby, information desk, automatic ticket machines, one-way faregates, restrooms (near exits 3)
B2	Platform 1	← KMRT Orange line toward Hamasen (Sinyi Elementary School)
B2	Island platform, doors will open on the left
B2	Platform 2	KMRT Orange line toward Daliao (Wukuaicuo) →

=== Exits ===
- Exit 1: Jhongjheng 2nd Rd. (west)
- Exit 2: Shangyi St., Wufu Junior High School
- Exit 3: Kaohsiung Cultural Center, National Kaohsiung Normal University
- Exit 4: President Department Store Heping branch, (Note: The department store was closed and auctioned in 2019. Currently, only the gym on the 10th and 11th floors and the underground parking lot are in operation.) Rainbow Park

== Co-located building ==
The station is intentionally co-located with a building formerly used as a department store.

Building
Levels	Status
11	Gym
10	Gym
9	For rent
8	For rent
7	For rent
6	For rent
5	For rent
4	For rent
3	For rent
2	For rent
1	For rent
B1	Parking lot
B2	Parking lot

== Around the station ==
- Kaohsiung Cultural Center
- National Kaohsiung Normal University
- President Department Store
- Water Tower Park
- Wufu Junior High School
