= List of tallest buildings in Kaohsiung =

Tall buildings in Kaohsiung
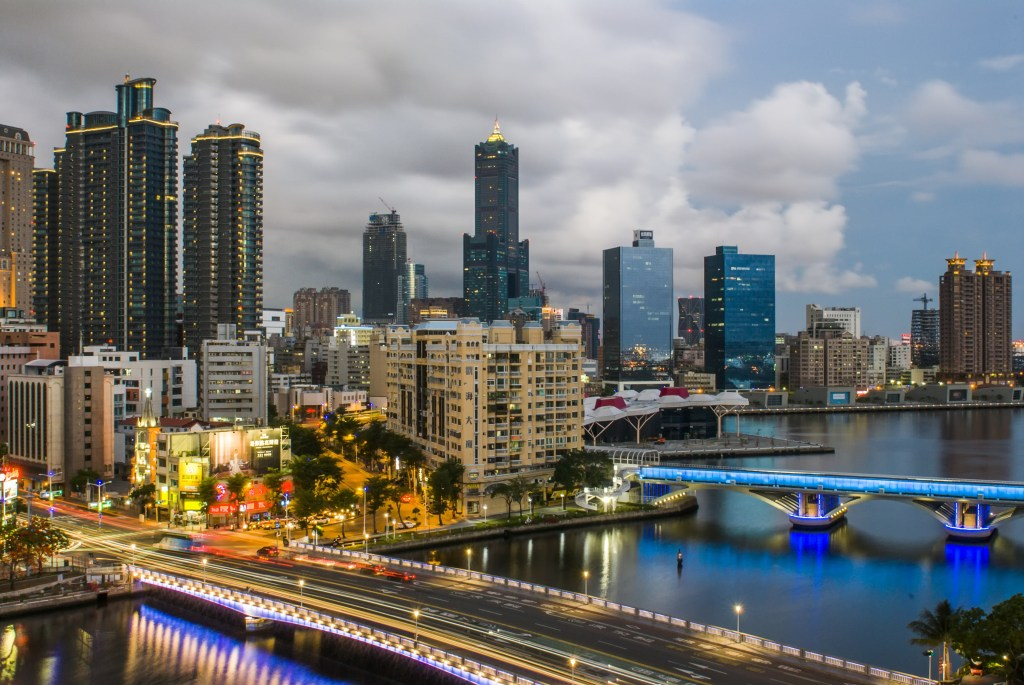
- Skyline of Kaohsiung in 2018
- Tallest building: 85 Sky Tower (1997)
- Tallest building height: 347.5 m (1,140 ft)
- First 150 m+ building: Chang-Gu World Trade Center (1992)

Number of tall buildings
- Taller than 100 m (328 ft): 153 (2025)
- Taller than 150 m (492 ft): 12 (2025)
- Taller than 200 m (656 ft): 3 (2025)
- Taller than 300 m (984 ft): 1

This list of tallest buildings in Kaohsiung ranks skyscrapers in the southern Taiwanese city of Kaohsiung, the third largest city in Taiwan, by height. As of March 2024, Kaohsiung has 12 buildings reaching 150 metres (492 ft) in height.

The tallest building in Kaohsiung is currently the 85-story 85 Sky Tower, which rises 378 metres (1,240 ft), including the antenna. Completed in 1997, it is also the second tallest building in Taiwan.

Most of the tallest buildings in Kaohsiung were completed in 1990s at the time Kaohsiung's local economy reached a peak. Entering 2000s, many proposed plans were suspended as a result of the continuing economic downturn in southern Taiwan.

== Overview ==
Located at the heart of the Asia-Pacific transportation hub, Kaohsiung has a world-class international port and Taiwan's largest deep-water port. In the 1990s, the Kaohsiung Harbor was once the world's third largest integrated port by cargo throughput (it is now currently the 13th in the world), second only to that of New York and Rotterdam. The Kaohsiung Harbor was important in the development of Taiwan's basic industry and helped the rapid increase in the Taiwanese economy in the 1960s. Its landmark skyscrapers also directly witnessed Taiwan's economic peak in the 1990s, which led to the first wave of skyscraper construction. Amongst them, the 85 Sky Tower has created many unprecedented innovations in Taiwan at that time. In the later period, with the decline of Taiwan's economy and competition from other Asian ports located in emerging countries, the Kaohsiung economy has turned from prosperity to decline. Thus, the construction of skyscrapers in Kaohsiung has gradually receded, and many of the buildings in the project have been put on hold. After 2013, with the implementation of Kaohsiung's public construction and policies, the trend of skyscraper construction has gradually recovered. Some of the planned buildings that have been put on hold have also been relaunched. More than 100 buildings exceeding 100 meters have been completed. The tallest buildings are mostly concentrated in downtown Kaohsiung, which was the original Kaohsiung city before it was merged with Kaohsiung County in 2010.

== Cityscape ==
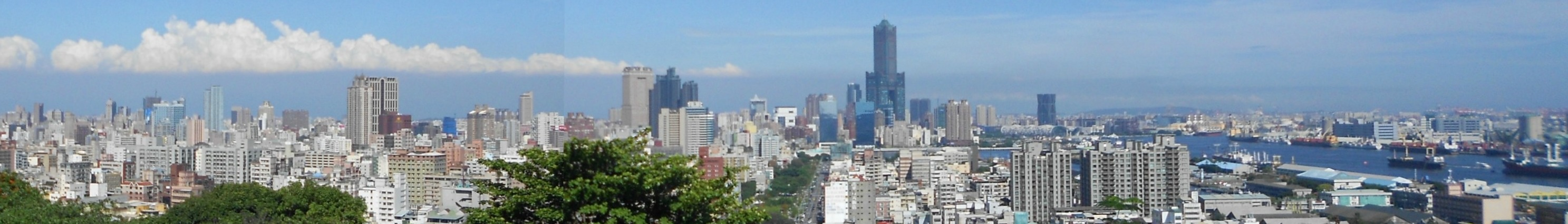
Panorama of Kaohsiung's skyline with 85 Sky Tower in the centre.

== Tallest buildings ==
Only buildings over 120 m (390 ft) are included. An equal sign (=) following a rank indicates the same height between two or more buildings. The "Year" column indicates the year of completion. The list includes only habitable buildings, as opposed to structures such as observation towers, radio masts, transmission towers and chimneys.

Rank	Name	Image	Height m (ft)	Floors	Year	District	Notes
1	85 Sky Tower (高雄85大樓)		347.5 m (1,140 ft)	85	1997	Lingya District	50th tallest in the world, 27th in Asia and tallest in Kaohsiung. First building in Taiwan to reach 300 m and was the tallest from 1997 to 2004.
2	Farglory THE ONE (遠雄THE ONE)		268.6 m (881 ft)	70	2019	Cianjhen District	Tallest residential building in Taiwan.
3	Chang-Gu World Trade Center (長谷世貿大樓)		222 m (728 ft)	50	1992	Sanmin District	Tallest building in Taiwan from 1992 to 1993 and first building in Taiwan to reach 200 m.
4	Han-Lai New World Center (漢來新世界中心)		186 m (610 ft)	42	1995	Qianjin District	
5	Guo-Yan Building BC (國揚國硯 BC)		171 m (561 ft)	41	2013	Lingya District	
6	Asia-Pacific Financial Plaza (宏總亞太財經廣場)		169.8 m (557 ft)	42	1992	Lingya District	
7	Next 100 (國城定潮)		163 m (535 ft)	41	2021	Cianjhen District	
8	Han-Hsien International Hotel (寒軒國際大飯店)		160.3 m (526 ft)	42	1994	Lingya District	
9	Kaohsiung Marriott Hotel (高雄萬豪酒店)		156 m (512 ft)	31	2019	Gushan District	
10	Kingtown King Park (京城京城)		154 m (505 ft)	36	2015	Gushan District	
11	Highwealth - City of Leadership A (興富發華人匯 A棟)		150 m (490 ft)	38	2016	Gushan District	
11=	Highwealth - City of Leadership B (興富發華人匯 B棟)		150 m (490 ft)	38	2016	Gushan District	
13	Xin-Fu-Hwa (馨馥華)		149 m (489 ft)	41	2000	Sinsing District	
13=	Vespi Tower (維士比大樓)		149 m (489 ft)	32	1998	Lingya District	
15	Kaohsiung Main Public Library Phase II (高雄市圖書總館第二期文創會館)		148 m (486 ft)	27	2020	Cianjhen District	
16	Ba Ba - Central Park (巴巴中央花園)		144 m (472 ft)	38	2015	Qianjin District	
17	Guo-Yan Building A (國揚國硯 A)		144 m (472 ft)	38	2013	Lingya District	
18	Highwealth - The Only Royal B (興富發國王一號院 B棟)		143 m (469 ft)	33	2014	Lingya District	
18=	Highwealth - The Only Royal A (興富發國王一號院 A棟)		143 m (469 ft)	33	2014	Lingya District	
20	Kaohsiung Twin Towers 1 (夢萊茵 1)		142 m (466 ft)	35	1996	Qianjin District	
20=	Kaohsiung Twin Towers 2 (夢萊茵 2)		142 m (466 ft)	35	1996	Qianjin District	
20=	Dali Palace (達麗宮廷)		141.8 m (465 ft)	35	2014	Zuoying District	Tallest in Zuoying District.
23	Highwealth - King Castle (興富發國王城堡)		141 m (463 ft)	36	2014	Gushan District	
24	King's Town Hyatt (京城凱悅)		137 m (449 ft)	35	2009	Qianjin District	
25	Bao-Cheng Enterprise Tower (寶成企業大下)		135 m (443 ft)	37	1997	Qianjin District	
25=	Cathay Pacific Central Plaza (國泰中央廣場)		135 m (443 ft)	30	2000	Cianjhen District	
25=	China Steel Corporation Headquarters (中鋼集團總部大樓)		135 m (443 ft)	29	2013	Cianjhen District	
28	Shr-Hwa Financial Center (世華金融大樓)		129 m (423 ft)	30	1996	Sinsing District	
29	Cathay Shi-Wei Financial Center (國泰四維財經大樓)		126 m (413 ft)	27	2001	Lingya District	
29=	Hsiung Kang Sin Yi Art Museum (雄崗信義美術館)		126 m (413 ft)	33	2018	Gushan District	
31	Times Regal Tower (時代富豪優生企業大樓)		122 m (400 ft)	29	1999	Zuoying District	

== Tallest under construction ==
Rank	Name	District	Height (m)	Floors	Expected completion year						
Rank	Name	District	Height (m)	Floors	Expected completion year	1	Fubon Aozihdi (富邦凹子底開發案)	Gushan	239.8	48	2026
2	Eskyland B (義享天地B)	Gushan	156	29	2025						

== Gallery ==
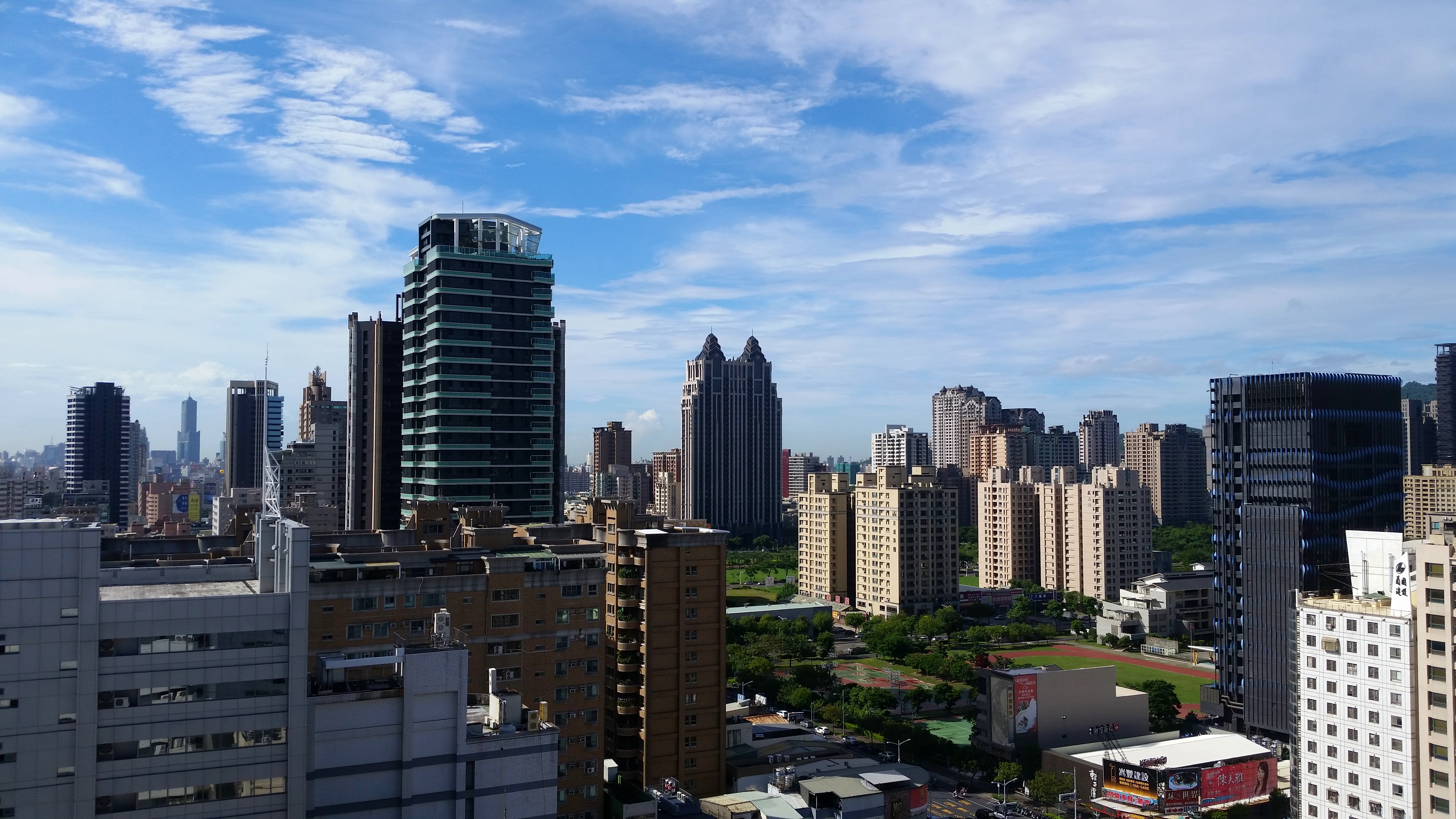
Kaohsiung skyline in Zuoying District and Gushan District.

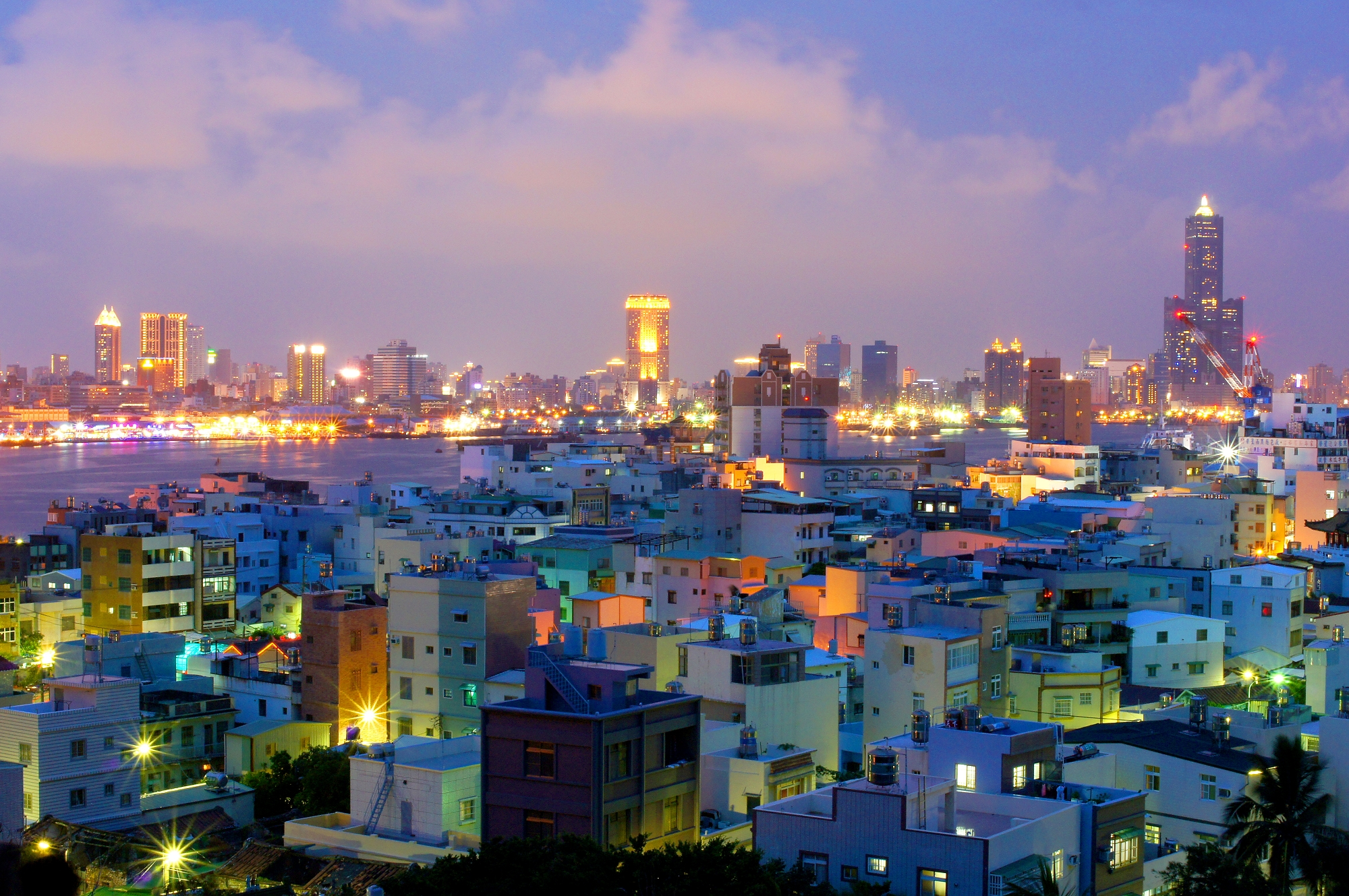
Kaohsiung skyline at dusk viewed from Cijin District.

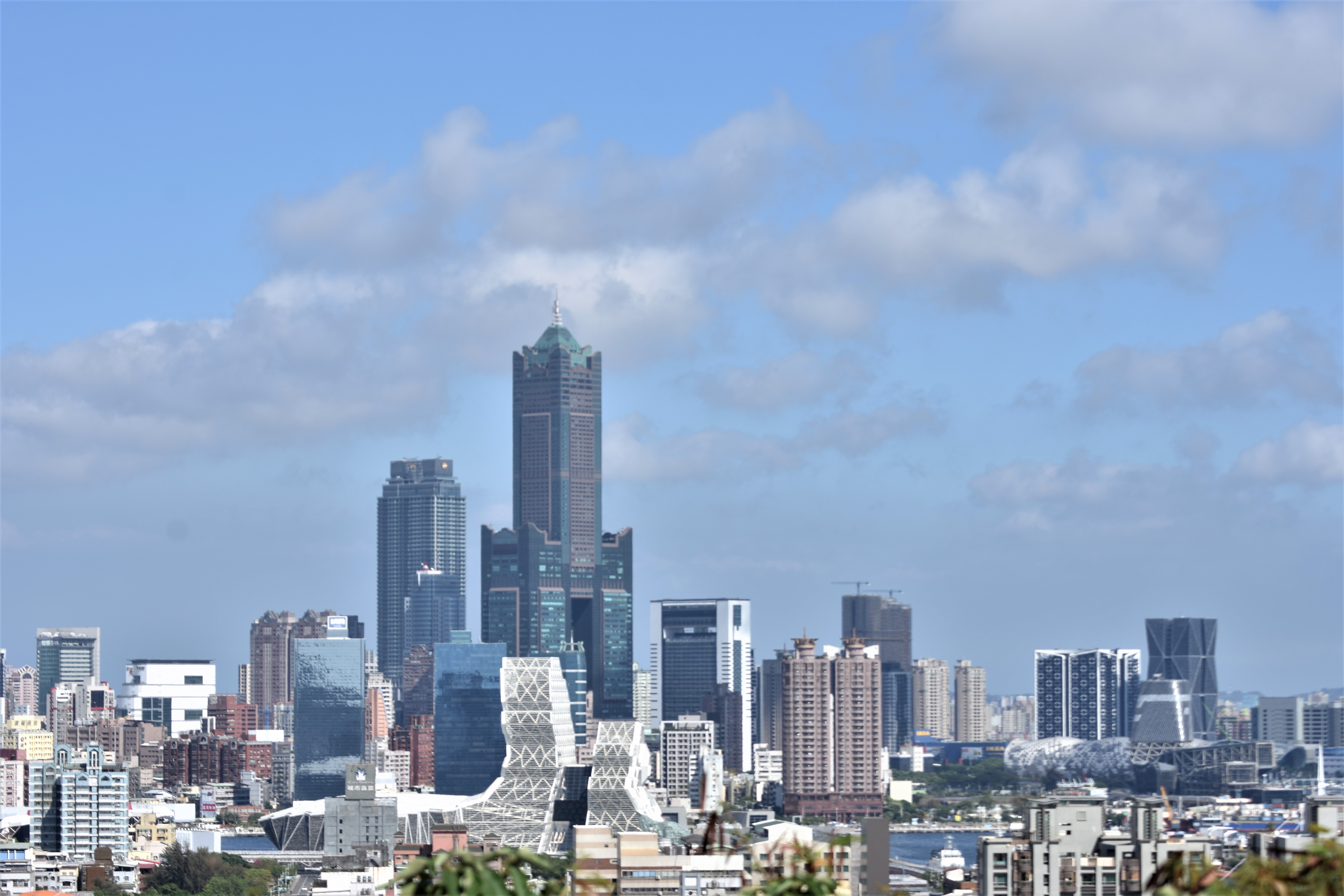
Kaohsiung skyline in May 2020.

== See also ==
- Skyscraper
- List of tallest buildings
- List of tallest buildings in Taiwan
- List of tallest buildings in New Taipei City
- List of tallest buildings in Taichung
- List of tallest buildings in Taipei
