= Cathay Central Plaza =

Skyscraper office building in Qianzhen, Kaohsiung, Taiwan

Cathay Central Plaza 國泰中央廣場
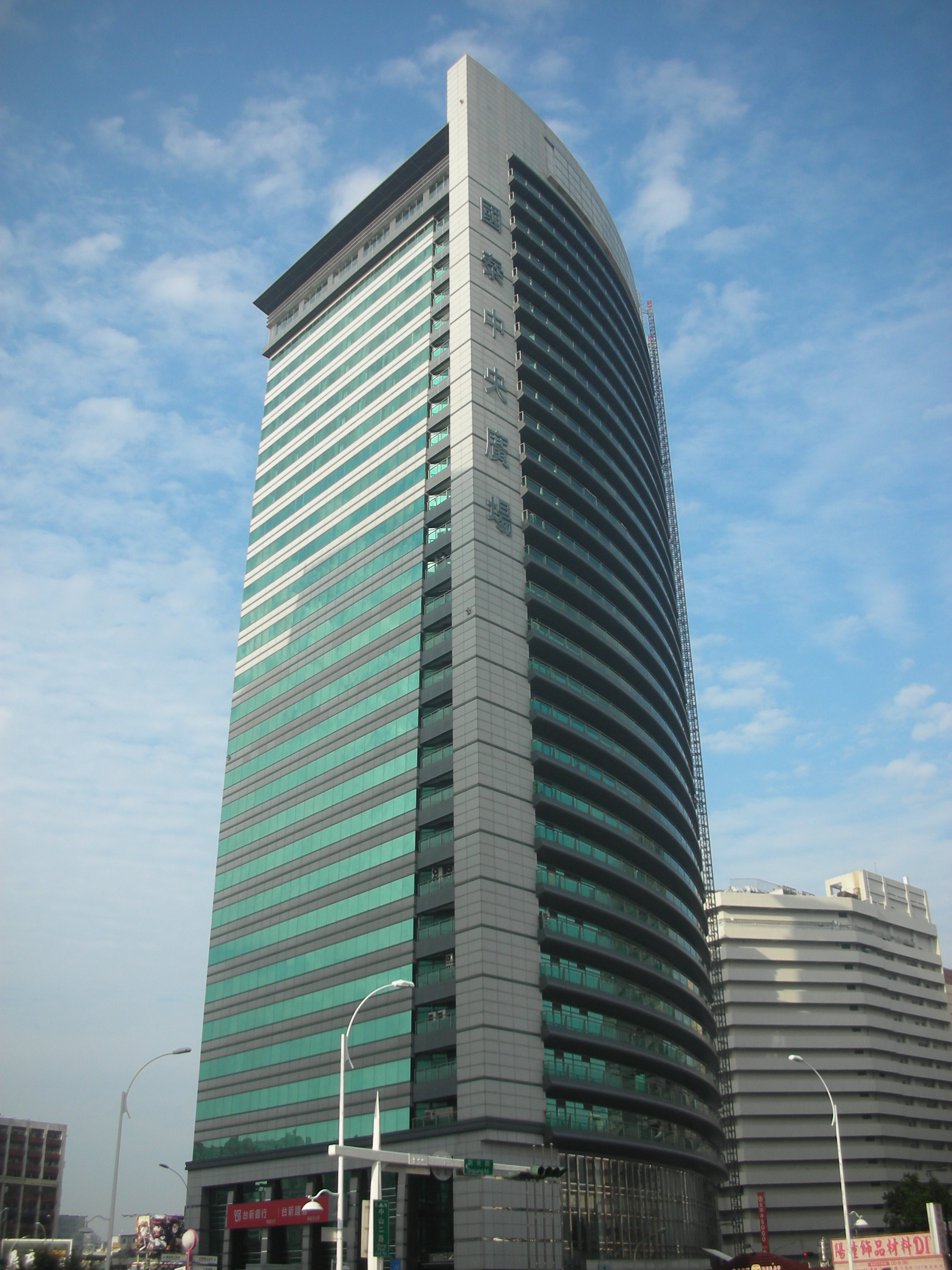
- Interactive map of the Cathay Central Plaza 國泰中央廣場 area

General information
- Status: Completed
- Type: Office building
- Classification: Office, Hotel
- Location: No. 260, Zhongshan 2nd Road, Cianjhen District, Kaohsiung, Taiwan
- Coordinates: 22°36′48.02″N 120°18′18.76″E
- Construction started: 1998
- Completed: 2000

Height
- Tip: 135 m (443 ft)
- Roof: 118 m (387 ft)

Technical details
- Floor count: 30

Design and construction
- Architect: Liu Associates

The Cathay Central Plaza, formerly known as Wang-Xiang Central Plaza (Chinese: 國泰中央廣場), is a 30-story, 135 metres (443 ft) skyscraper office building completed in 2000 in Cianjhen District, Kaohsiung, Taiwan. Designed by Liu Associates, this building has a triangular footprint and is topped by a pyramid. It is owned by the Mountain Group, which also owns the Shr-Hwa Financial Center in Kaohsiung. As of February 2021, it is the 24th tallest building in Kaohsiung.

== The Hotel ==
Other than office spaces, the 22nd to 29th floors of the building houses the Hotel Cozzi Zhongshan Kaohsiung. The four-star hotel has a total of 182 rooms including premium suites, themed restaurants, a café. From the Cozzi the Roof Restaurant on the 30th floor, one can overlook the night skyline of the city, including the famous landmark 85 Sky Tower.

== See also ==
- List of tallest buildings in Taiwan
- List of tallest buildings in Kaohsiung
- Cathay Shi-Wei Financial Center
