= Shr-Hwa Financial Center =

Skyscraper office building in Xinxing, Kaohsiung, Taiwan

Shr-Hwa Financial Center 國泰世華金融大樓
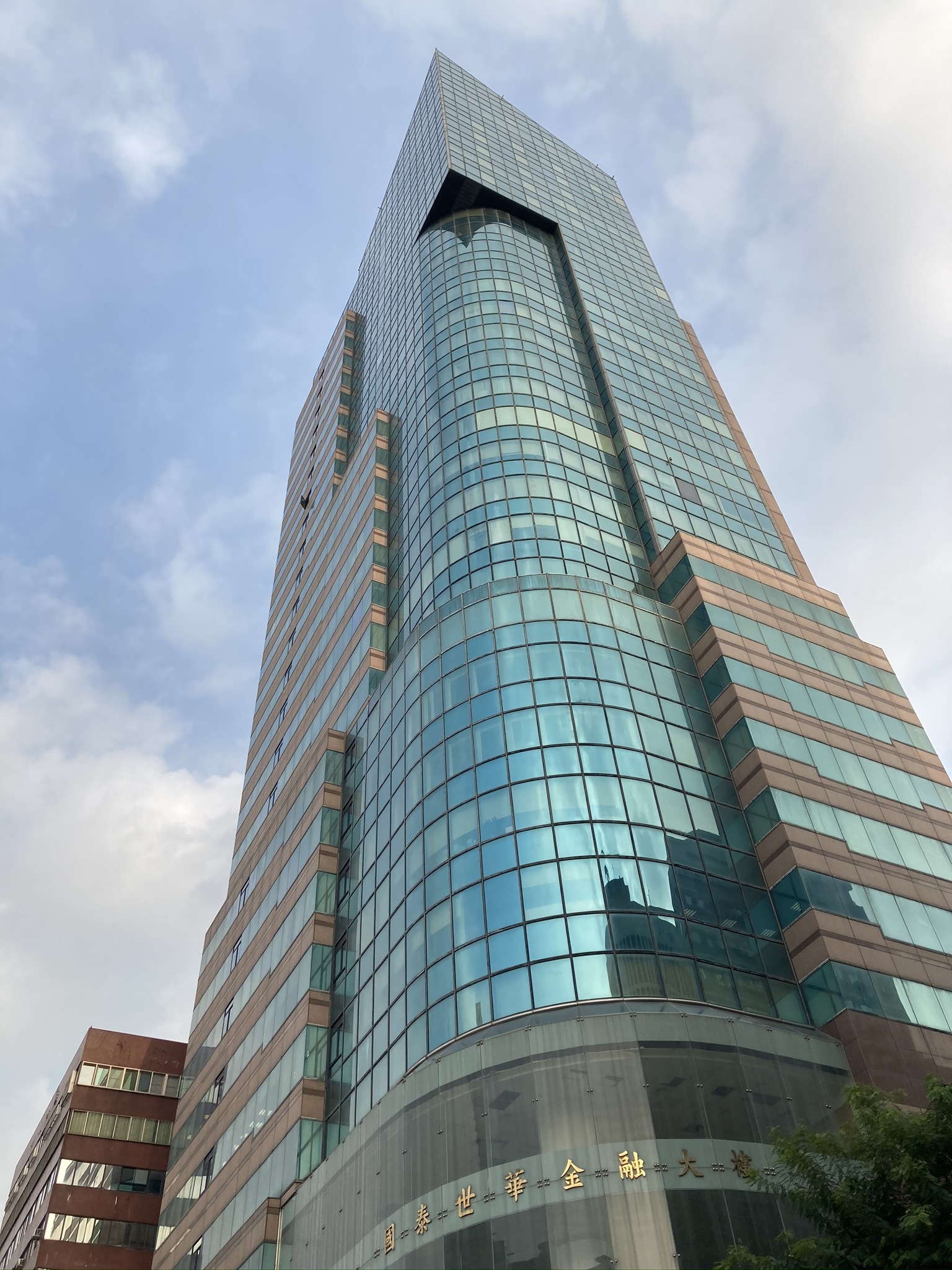
- Interactive map of the Shr-Hwa Financial Center 國泰世華金融大樓 area

General information
- Status: Completed
- Type: Office building
- Classification: Office
- Location: No. 55, Zhongzheng 3rd Road, Sinsing District, Kaohsiung, Taiwan
- Coordinates: 22.630921351221907°N 120.30831206864012°E
- Completed: 1996

Height
- Roof: 129 m (423 ft)

Technical details
- Floor count: 30

The Shr-Hwa Financial Center, also known as United World Chinese Bank (Chinese: 國泰世華金融大樓), is a 30-story, 129 metres (423 ft) skyscraper office building completed in 1996 in Sinsing District, Kaohsiung, Taiwan. The top floor of the building is the Mountain Group Museum, which displays arts and other collections by the Mountain Group, which also owns the Cathay Pacific Central Plaza in Kaohsiung. In November 2020, the corporate headquarters of the ecKare group owned by Eastern Media International was established in the building. As of February 2021, it is the 26th tallest building in Kaohsiung.

== See also ==
- List of tallest buildings in Taiwan
- List of tallest buildings in Kaohsiung
