= Highwealth - City of Leadership =

Residential twin skyscrapers in Gushan, Kaohsiung, Taiwan

Highwealth - City of Leadership 興富發華人匯
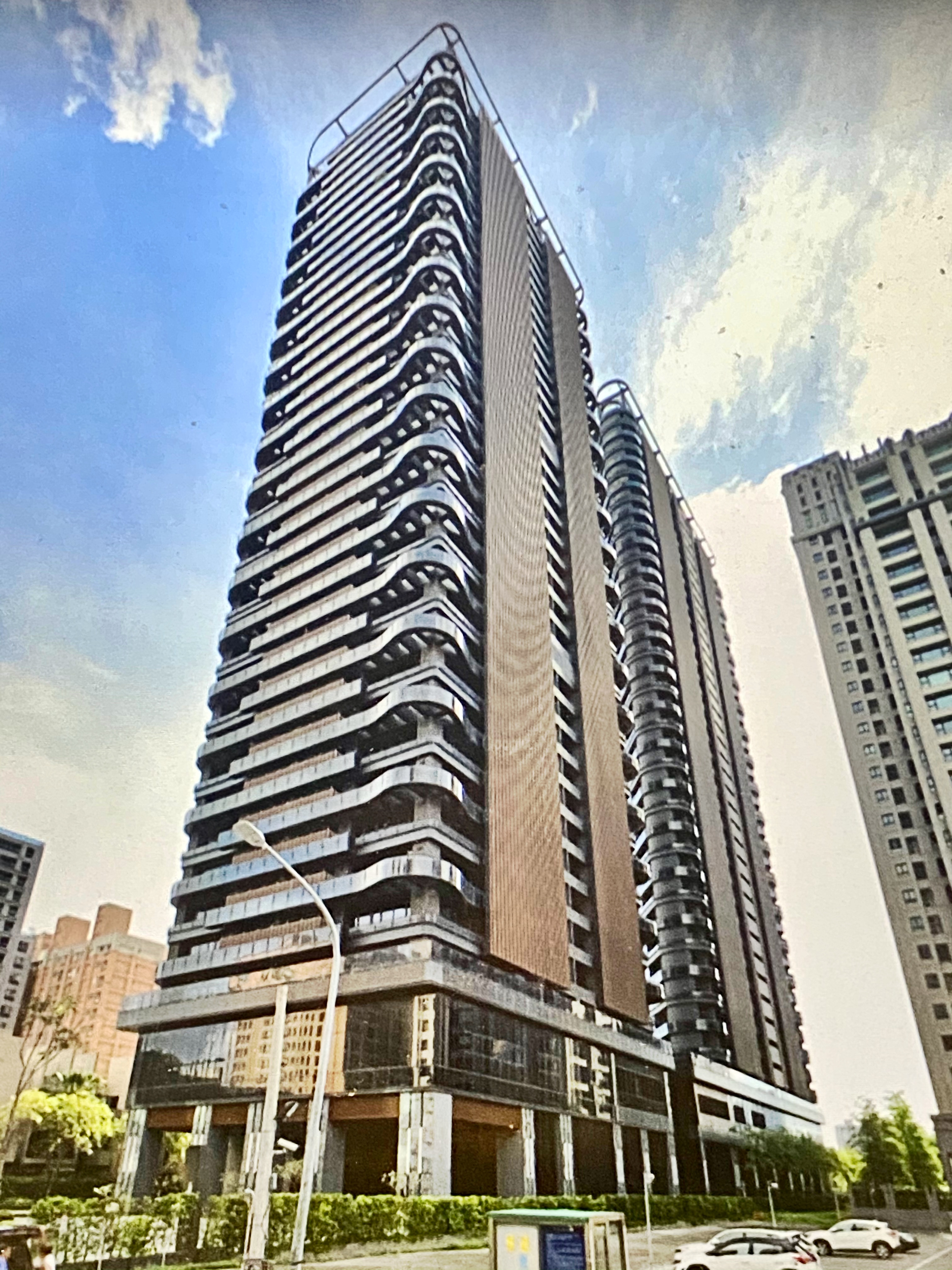
- Interactive map of the Highwealth - City of Leadership 興富發華人匯 area

General information
- Status: Completed
- Type: Residential
- Location: No. 287, Longsheng Road, Gushan District, Kaohsiung, Taiwan
- Coordinates: 22.660011403533623°N 120.29497861096907°E
- Completed: 2016

Height
- Architectural: 150 m (490 ft)

Technical details
- Floor count: 38

Design and construction
- Architect: T. D. LEE Architects

The Highwealth - City of Leadership (Chinese: 興富發華人匯) is a complex of twin residential skyscrapers located in Gushan District, Kaohsiung, Taiwan. The height of the buildings is 150 m (490 ft), each comprising 38 floors above ground. The buildings were completed in 2016. As of March 2025, the buildings are the 11th tallest in Kaohsiung. Designed by T. D. LEE Architects, the buildings were constructed under strict requirements of preventing damage caused by earthquakes and typhoons common in Taiwan.

== See also ==
- List of tallest buildings in Taiwan
- List of tallest buildings in Kaohsiung
- Kingtown King Park
