= Bao-Cheng Enterprise Tower =

Skyscraper office building in Qianzhen, Kaohsiung, Taiwan

Bao-Cheng Enterprise Tower 寶成企業大樓
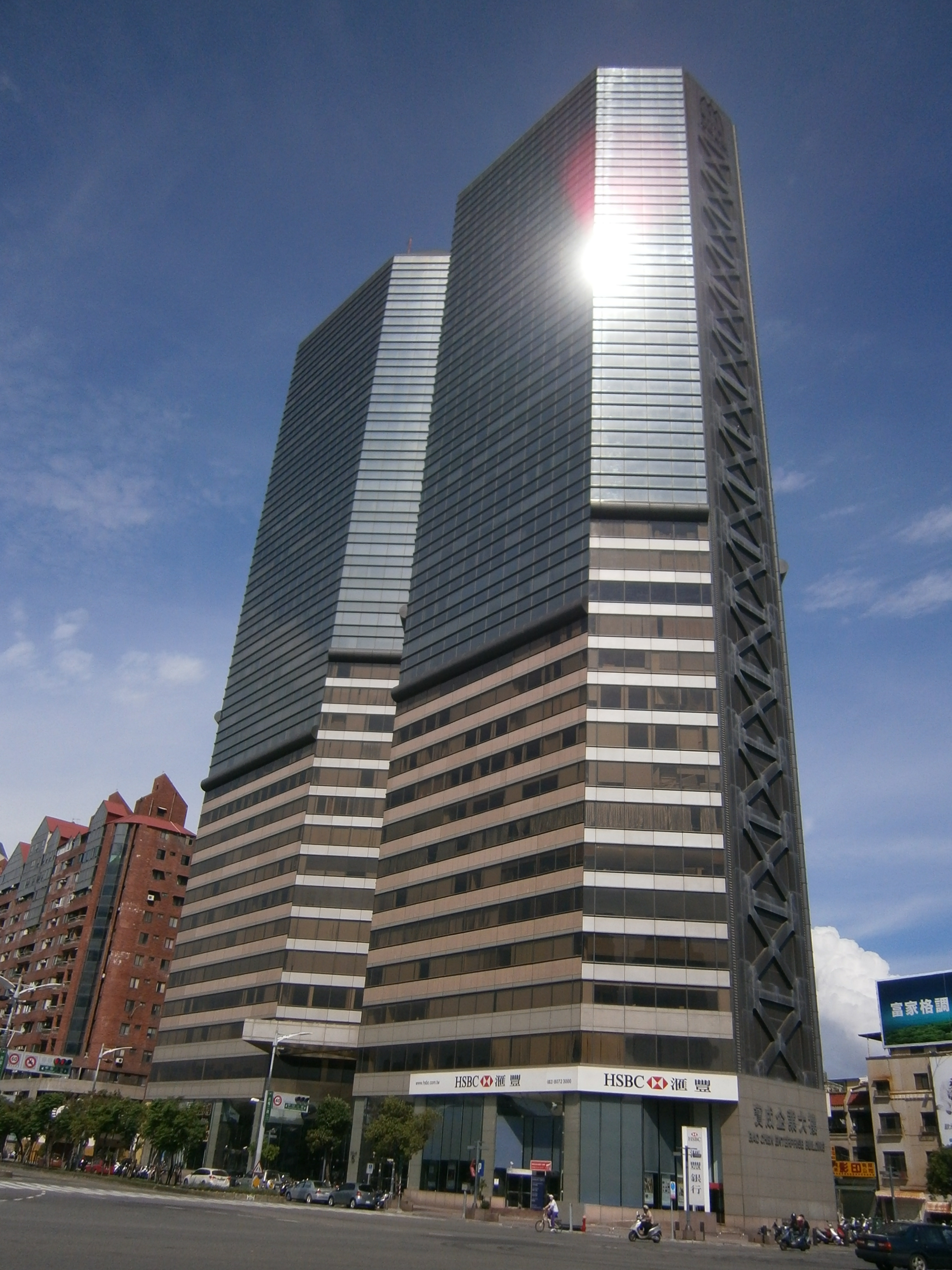
- Interactive map of the Bao-Cheng Enterprise Tower 寶成企業大樓 area

General information
- Status: Completed
- Type: Office
- Location: No. 6-8, Min-Chuan 2nd Road, Cianjhen District, Kaohsiung, Taiwan
- Coordinates: 22°36′18″N 120°18′35″E
- Construction started: 1988
- Completed: 1991

Height
- Architectural: 135 m (443 ft)

Technical details
- Floor count: 34
- Floor area: 96,100 m^{2} (1,034,000 sq ft)

The Bao-Cheng Enterprise Tower (Chinese: 寶成企業大樓; pinyin: Bǎo chéng qǐyè dàlóu) is a skyscraper office building located in Cianjhen District, Kaohsiung, Taiwan. Construction of the building began in 1988 and it was completed in 1991, making it one of the earliest skyscrapers in Kaohsiung. The building was designed by Taiwanese architect Yong-Hong Hwang (Chinese: 黃永洪) and has a total floor area of 96,100 m^{2} (1,034,000 sq ft), with a height of 135 m (443 ft) that comprise 37 floors above ground, as well as five basement levels. It houses the corporate headquarters of Pou Chen Corporation.

== See also ==
- List of tallest buildings in Taiwan
- List of tallest buildings in Kaohsiung
- Pou Chen Corporation
