= Fubon Aozihdi =

Skyscraper complex in Gushan, Kaohsiung, Taiwan

Coordinates: 22°39′25″N 120°18′07″E

Fubon Aozihdi Development Project 富邦凹子底開發案
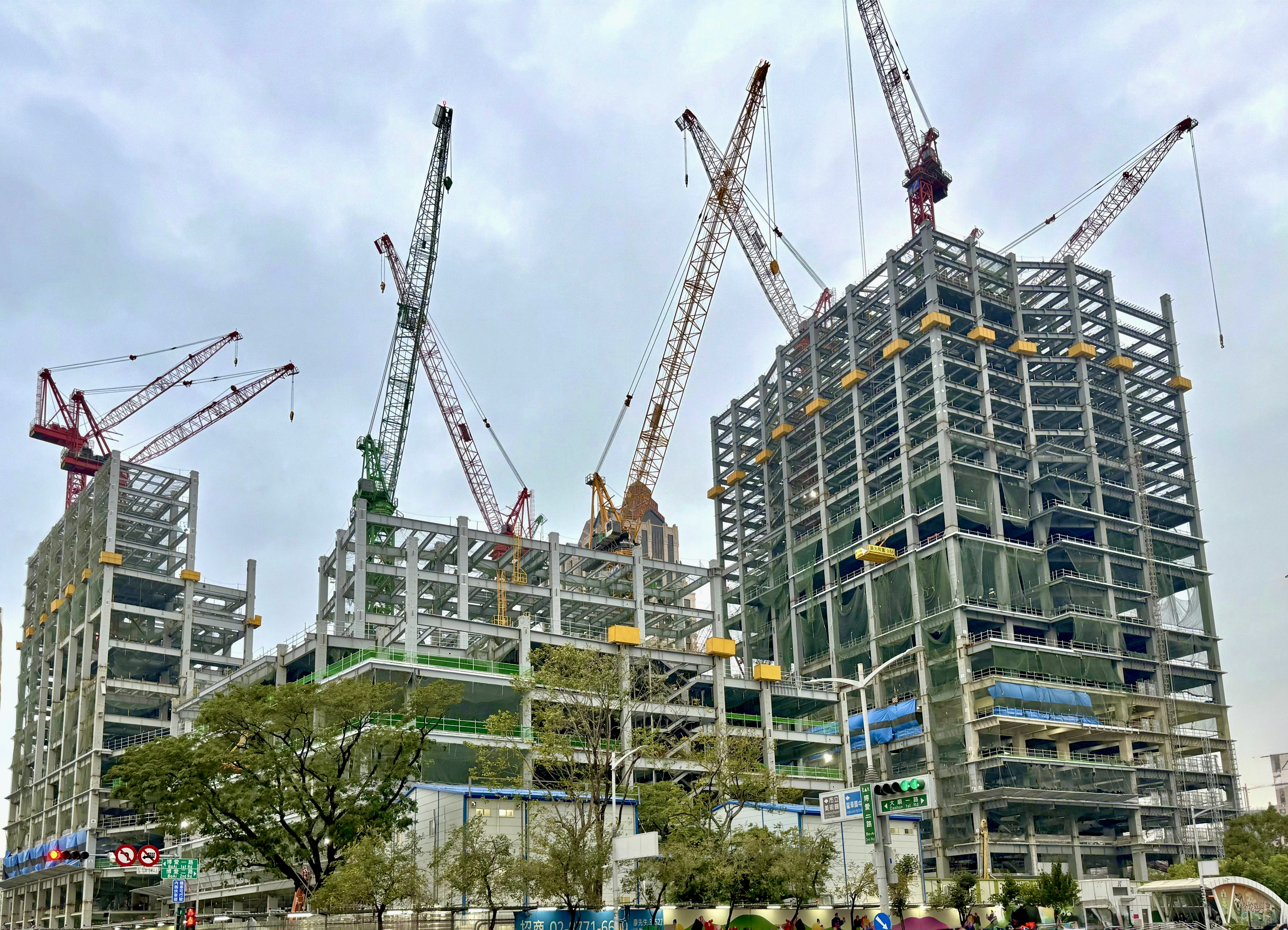
- Under construction in March 2025

General information
- Status: Under construction
- Type: Office building, Shopping mall, Hotel
- Location: Gushan District, Kaohsiung, Taiwan
- Construction started: May 13, 2021
- Estimated completion: 2025

Height
- Roof: North Tower: 239.8 m (787 ft); South Tower: 148.2 m (486 ft)

Technical details
- Floor count: North Tower: 48; South Tower: 25
- Floor area: 509,722.41 m^{2} (5,486,606.4 ft^{2})
- Grounds: 38,466.17 m^{2} (414,046.4 ft^{2})

Design and construction
- Structural engineer: Samsung C&T

The Fubon Aozihdi Development Project (Chinese: 富邦凹子底開發案) is an under-construction skyscraper complex located in Gushan District, Kaohsiung, Taiwan. Upon completion, it will be the third-tallest building in Kaohsiung, and the eighth-tallest in Taiwan. The complex consists of two skyscrapers, the height of taller building is 239.8 m (787 ft), and it comprises 48 floors above ground, as well as 6 basement levels. The height of the shorter building is 148.2 m (486 ft), and it comprises 25 floors above ground. Construction of the complex began on May 13, 2021, and it is expected to be completed in 2025.

The site of the development project has an area of 38,466.17 m^{2} (414,046.4 sq ft) and was formerly used by Longhua Elementary School. The project will create a commercial complex integrating shopping malls, a hotel, office spaces and an aquarium. The architectural design is designed by Mitsubishi Land. South Korean construction company Samsung C&T established a joint venture with a Taiwanese construction company to carry out this project. Samsung C&T'share of the project’s total estimated cost of approximately 1 trillion won is estimated at approximately 750 billion won.

== Gallery ==
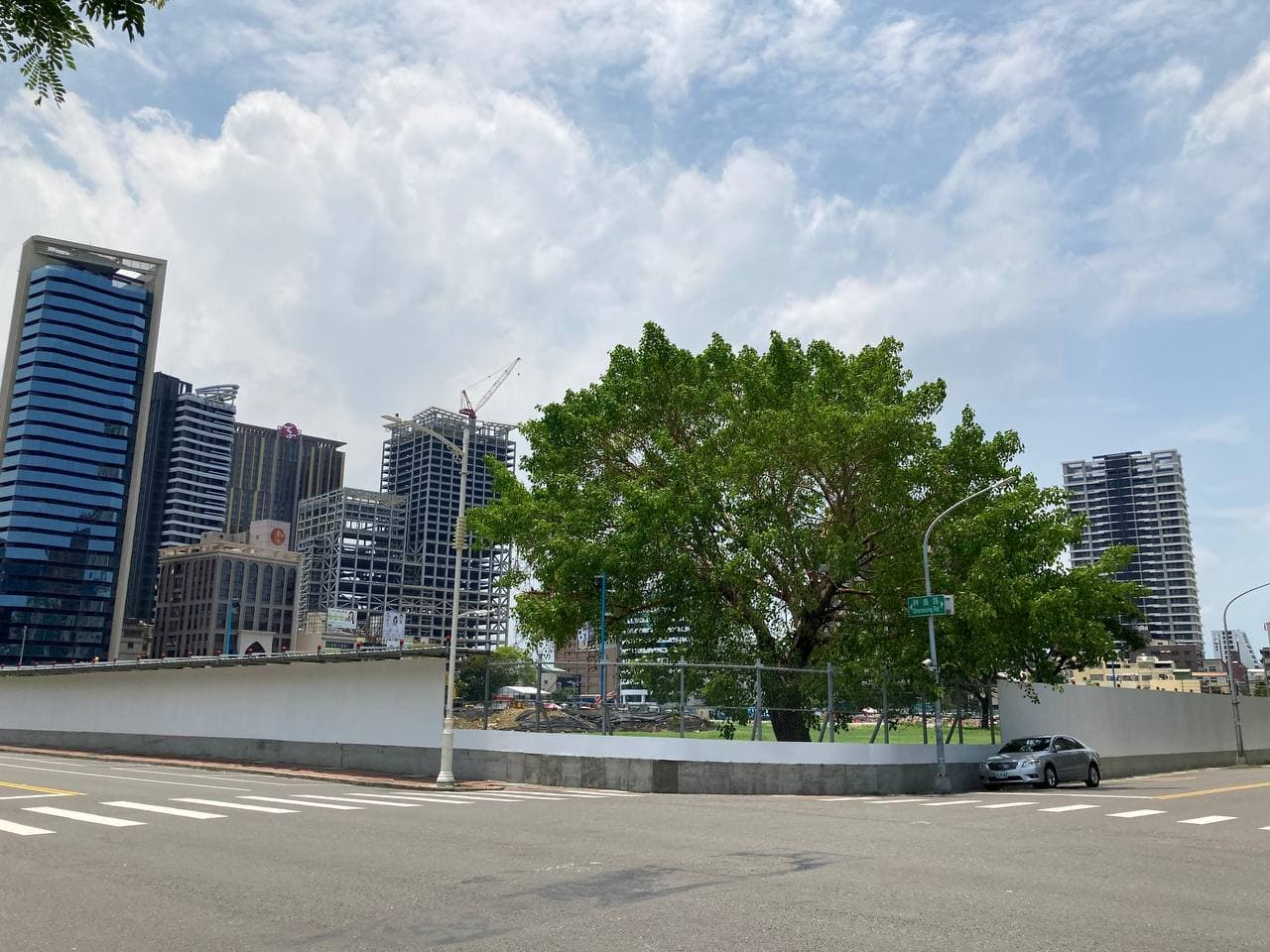
June 2021

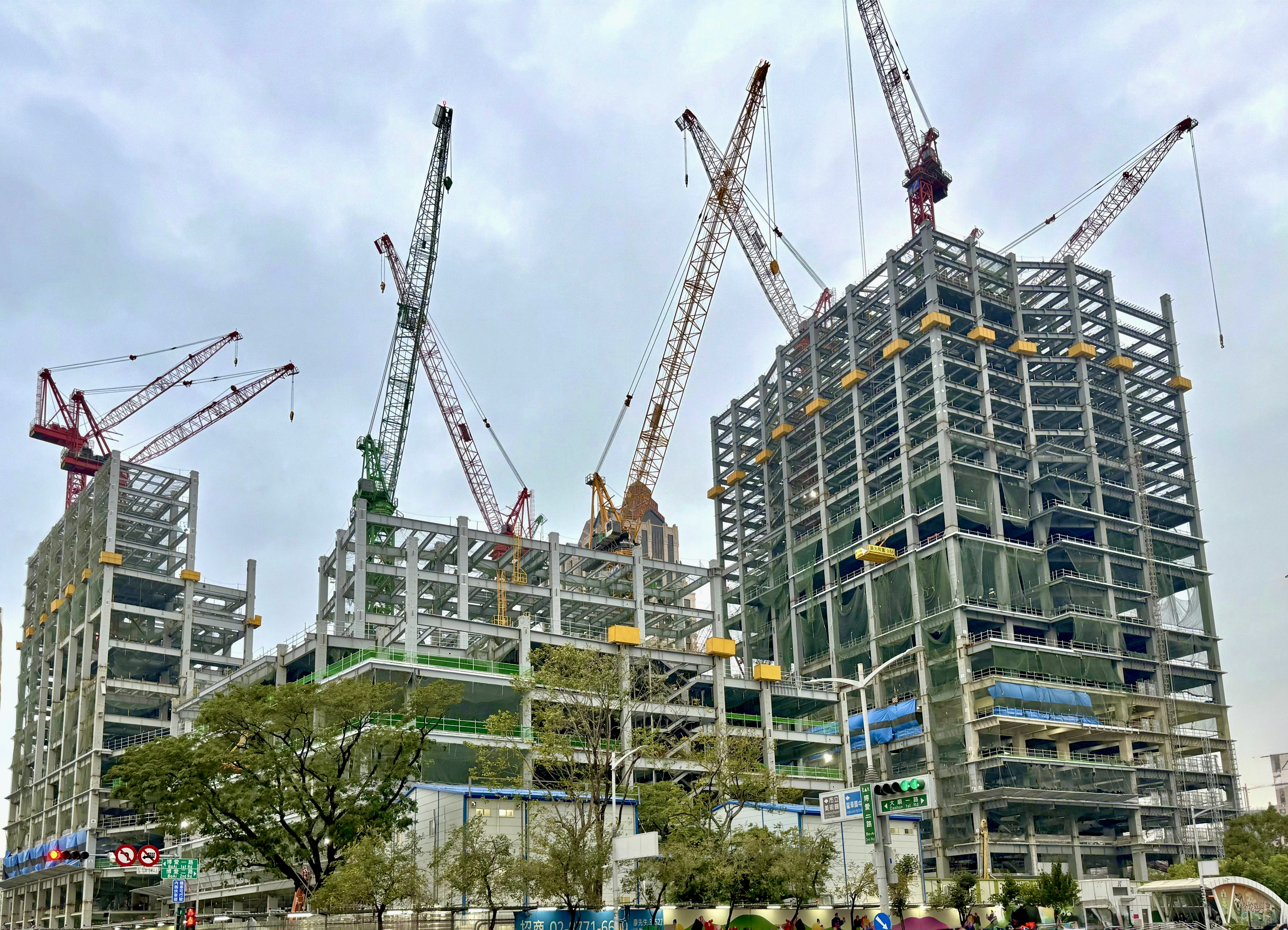
March 2025

== See also ==
- List of tallest buildings in Taiwan
- List of tallest buildings in Kaohsiung
- Fubon Xinyi A25
