= Hsiung Kang Sin Yi Art Museum =

Residential skyscraper in Gushan, Kaohsiung, Taiwan

Hsiung Kang Sin Yi Art Museum 雄崗信義美術館
- Interactive map of the Hsiung Kang Sin Yi Art Museum 雄崗信義美術館 area

General information
- Status: Completed
- Type: Residential
- Location: No. 308, Funong Road, Gushan District, Kaohsiung, Taiwan
- Coordinates: 22.65704324411648°N 120.29493697721762°E
- Construction started: 2012
- Completed: 2018

Height
- Architectural: 126 m (413 ft)

Technical details
- Floor count: 33 above ground 5 below ground
- Floor area: 43,771 m^{2} (471,150 sq ft)

Hsiung Kang Sin Yi Art Museum (Chinese: 雄崗信義美術館; pinyin: Xióng Gǎng Xìnyì Měishùguǎn) is a 33-story, 126 m (413 ft) tall residential skyscraper located in Gushan District, Kaohsiung, Taiwan. Construction of the skyscraper began in 2012 and it was completed in 2018, under strict requirements of preventing damage caused by earthquakes and typhoons common in the country. With a total floor area of 43,771 m^{2} (471,150 sq ft), the residential building provides 98 units of luxury apartments, with facilities such as a swimming pool, banquet hall, fitness center and a sky lounge on its topmost floor.

== See also ==
- List of tallest buildings in Taiwan
- List of tallest buildings in Kaohsiung
