= Xin-Fu-Hwa =

Residential skyscraper in Xinxing, Kaohsiung, Taiwan

Xin-Fu-Hwa 馨馥華
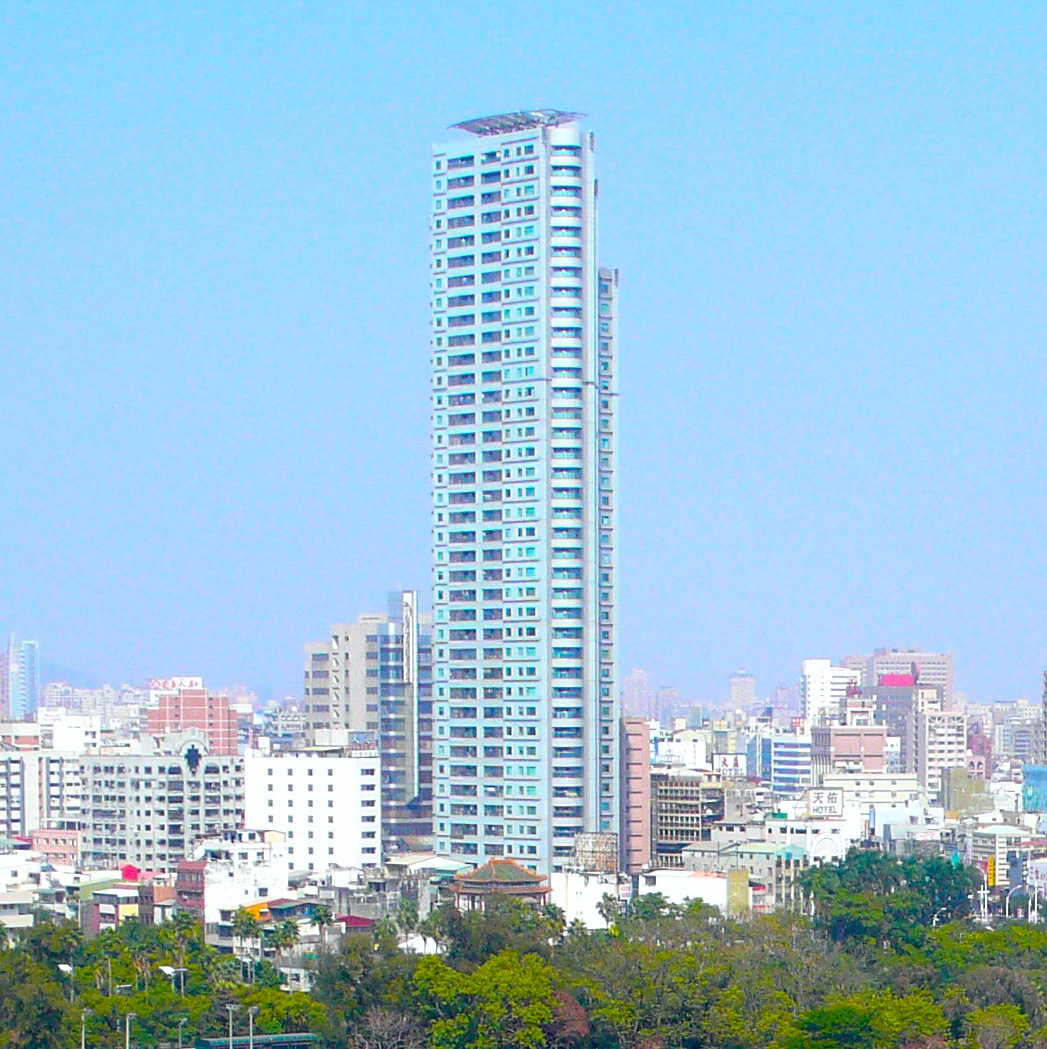
- Interactive map of the Xin-Fu-Hwa 馨馥華 area

General information
- Status: Completed
- Type: Residential
- Location: No. 36, Minsheng 2nd Road, Sinsing District, Kaohsiung, Taiwan
- Coordinates: 22°37′40″N 120°18′2″E
- Construction started: 1998
- Completed: 2000

Height
- Architectural: 149 m (489 ft)

Technical details
- Floor count: 41

The Xin-Fu-Hwa (Chinese: 馨馥華大樓; pinyin: Xīn fù huá dàlóu), is a residential skyscraper located in Sinsing District, Kaohsiung, Taiwan. Construction of the building began in 1998 and it was one of the tallest residential buildings in Kaohsiung when it was completed in 2000. The height of the building is 149 m (489 ft), and it comprises 41 floors above ground. The building is located close to Kaohsiung Central Park, with a view of the cityscape of Kaohsiung on its top floors.

== See also ==
- List of tallest buildings in Taiwan
- List of tallest buildings in Kaohsiung
- Peace Palace (Taipei)
- 55 Timeless
- Central Park (Kaohsiung)
