= Dali Palace =

Residential skyscraper in Zuoying, Kaohsiung, Taiwan

Dali Palace 達麗宮廷
- Interactive map of the Dali Palace 達麗宮廷 area

General information
- Status: Completed
- Type: Residential
- Location: No. 1386, Huaxia Road, Zuoying District, Kaohsiung, Taiwan
- Coordinates: 22.686863351793406°N 120.31292553984065°E
- Construction started: 2012
- Completed: 2014

Height
- Architectural: 141.8 m (465 ft)

Technical details
- Floor count: 35
- Floor area: 46,947 m^{2} (505,330 sq ft)

The Dali Palace (Chinese: 達麗宮廷) is a 35-story, 141.8 m (465 ft) residential skyscraper completed in 2014 and located in Zuoying District, Kaohsiung, Taiwan. Construction of the building began in 2012 and it was completed in 2014. The building has a total of 138 apartment units, with six basement levels and a floor area of 46,947 m^{2} (505,330 sq ft). As of March 2021, the building is the tallest in the district and the 19th tallest in Kaohsiung. Constructed under strict requirements of preventing damage caused by earthquakes and typhoons common in Taiwan, the building includes facilities such as a chess room, KTV, gym, outdoor swimming pool, sauna room, saloon, and a lounge bar.

== See also ==
- List of tallest buildings in Taiwan
- List of tallest buildings in Kaohsiung
- Zuoying District
