= Times Regal Tower =

Skyscraper office building in Zuoying, Kaohsiung, Taiwan

Times Regal Tower 時代富豪優生企業大樓
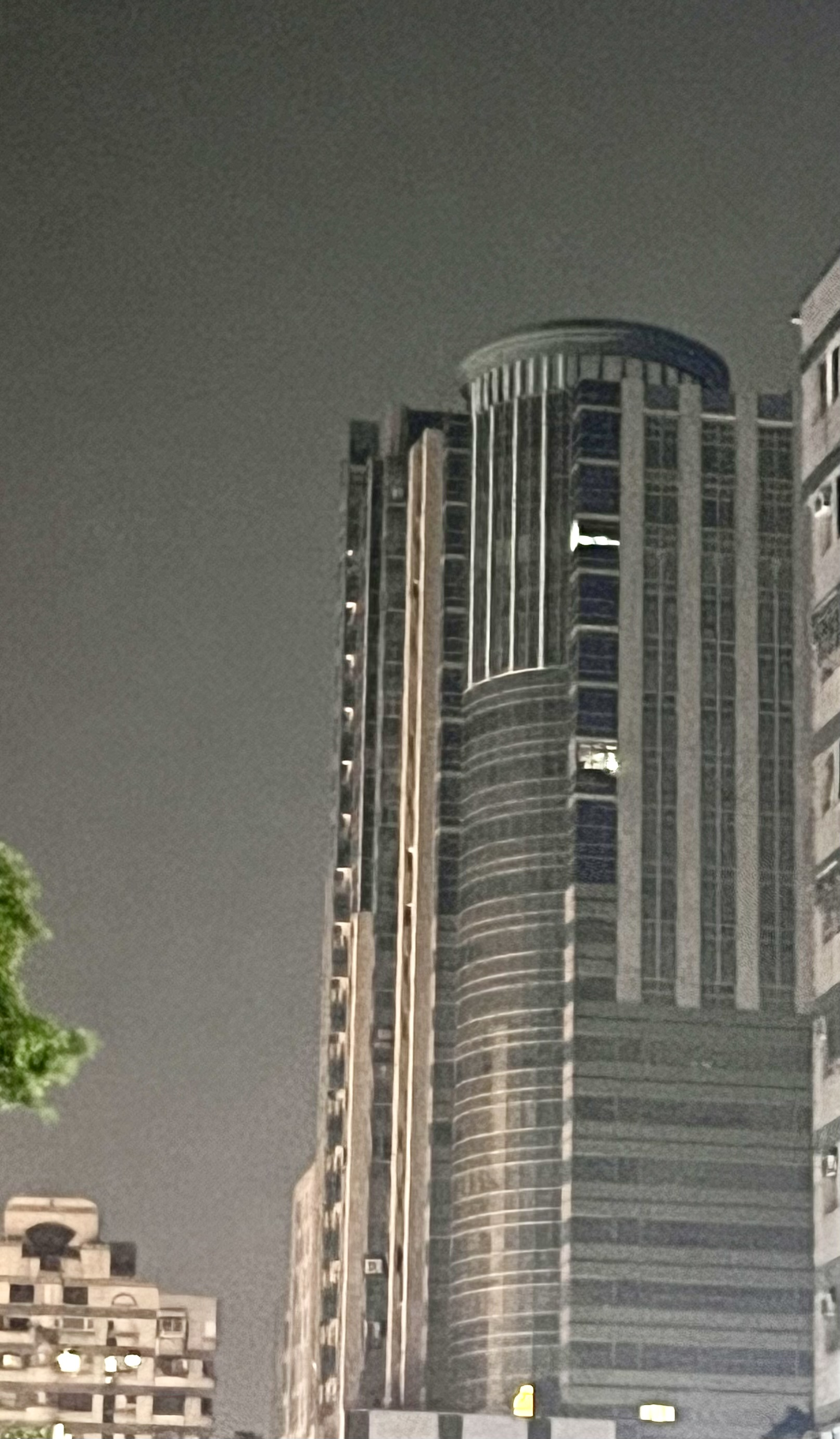
- Interactive map of the Times Regal Tower 時代富豪優生企業大樓 area

General information
- Status: Completed
- Type: Office building
- Classification: Office
- Location: No. 37, Zhengxin Street, Zuoying District, Kaohsiung, Taiwan
- Coordinates: 22.664966384557832°N 120.30397789328158°E
- Completed: 1999

Height
- Roof: 122 m (400 ft)

Technical details
- Floor count: 29

The Times Regal Tower (Chinese: 時代富豪優生企業大樓) is a 29-story, 122 metres (400 ft) skyscraper office building completed in 1999 in Zuoying District, Kaohsiung, Taiwan.

== Incidents ==
On May 24, 2006, the girlfriend of a man surnamed Huang, who had been with him for two years, proposed to break up. Huang went to the building where his girlfriend lived in an attempt to recover the relationship, but was rejected. At 9 pm, Huang, who was mentally unstable, ascended to the top floor of the Times Regal Tower on Zhengxin Road, Zuoying District, Kaohsiung City, and leapt down. After receiving reports from witnesses, the fire department dispatched three teams of ladder trucks to the scene for rescue. The police tried in vain to dissuade Huang from committing suicide. Fortunately, Huang survived after he hit the roof of a car in the parking lot first before hitting the ground.

== See also ==
- List of tallest buildings in Taiwan
- List of tallest buildings in Kaohsiung
