= Kaohsiung Cultural Center =

Cultural center in Lingya, Kaohsiung, Taiwan

- 高雄市文化中心
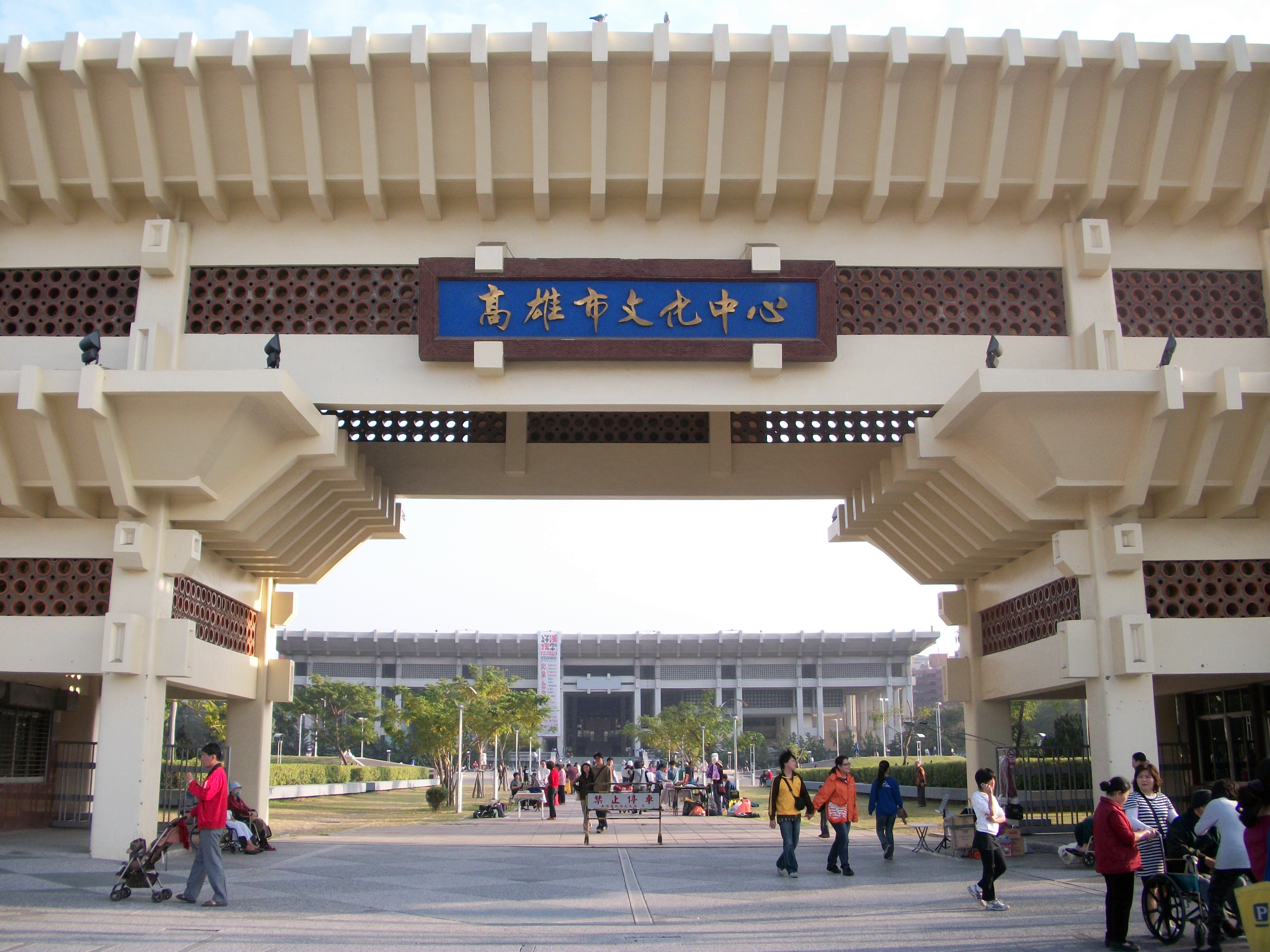
- Interactive map of Kaohsiung Cultural Center
- Former names: Kaohsiung Chiang Kai-shek Cultural Center
- Location: Lingya, Kaohsiung, Taiwan
- Coordinates: 22°37′36″N 120°19′04″E
- Type: cultural center
- Acreage: 13,884 m^{2}

The Kaohsiung Cultural Center (Chinese: 高雄市文化中心; pinyin: Gāoxióngshì Wénhuà Zhōngxīn) is a cultural center located in Lingya District of Kaohsiung, Taiwan. It was founded by the city government in 1981. The main building of the center is a complex of two concert halls, many galleries, and a library. The office of Kaohsiung Bureau of Cultural Affairs is also located in Kaohsiung Cultural Center.

== History ==
The cultural center was originally built as a memorial hall for Chiang Kai-shek; its former name was Kaohsiung Chiang Kai-shek Cultural Center (高雄市立中正文化中心). The memorial function was abolished by the city government in 2007, and the name was then changed to the current name.

== Structure ==
The main building is 13,884 m^{2}, the main audience hall located in the center called Jhihde Hall (至德堂) seats an audience of 1672. This hall is the cultural center for Kaohsiung city. The next largest hall Jhihshan Hall (至善廳) seats 483 people, this hall is available for other performances, rehearsals and speech. There are also Chih-Chen Hall (至真堂) and Chih-Mei Galleries (至美軒), for artists and students.

== Notable events ==
- Golden Horse Film Festival and Awards (18th, 20th, 22nd, 33rd, 39th)

== Transportation ==
The cultural center is accessible within walking distance South from Cultural Center Station of Kaohsiung Metro.

== See also ==
- List of museums in Taiwan
- List of tourist attractions in Taiwan
