= Han-Hsien International Hotel =

Hotel in Lingya, Kaohsiung, Taiwan

- 寒軒國際大飯店
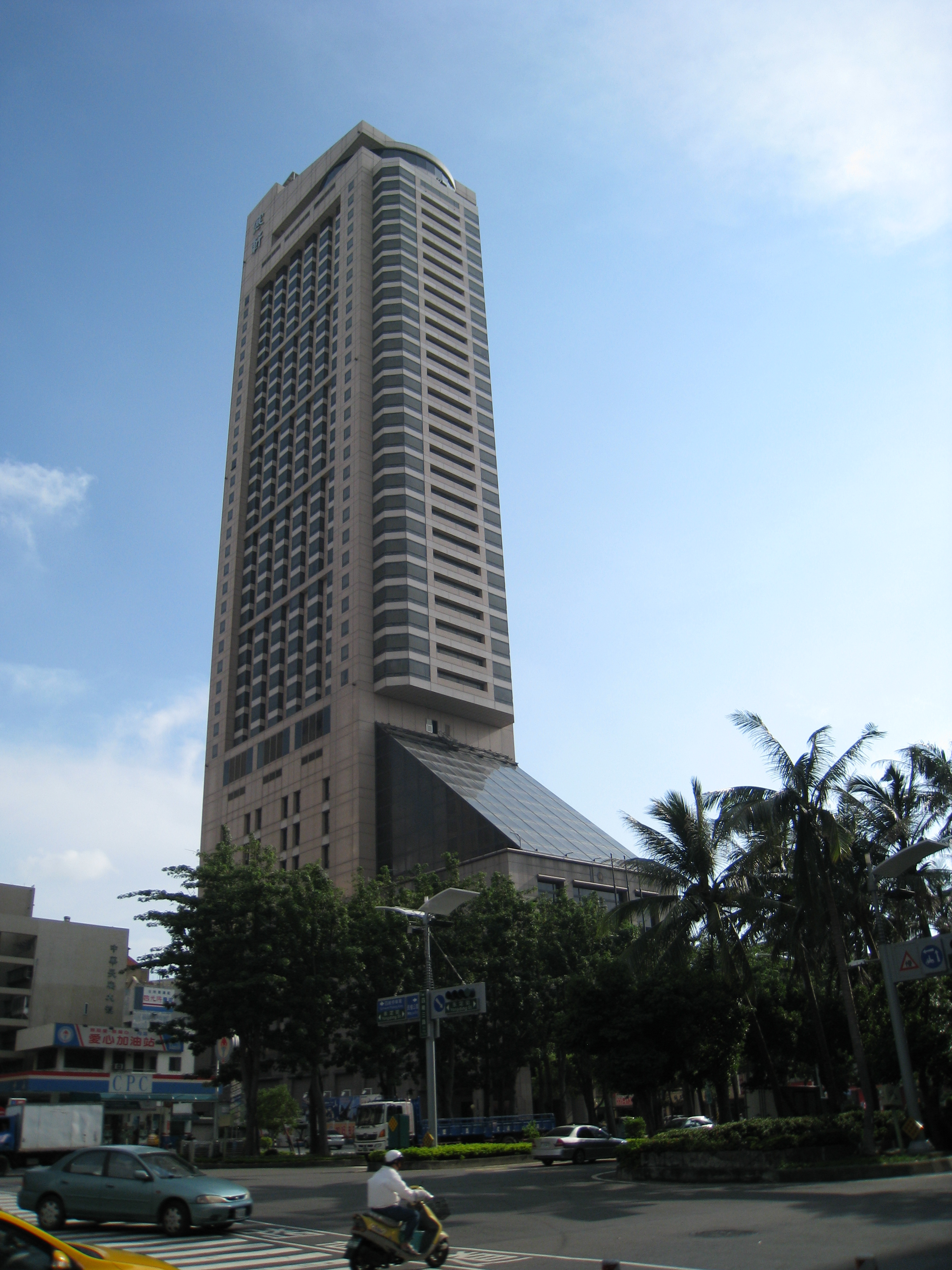

- Location within Taiwan
- Alternative names: Linden Hotel

General information
- Status: Completed
- Type: Skyscraper
- Classification: hotel
- Location: Lingya District, 33 Siwei 3rd Road, Kaohsiung City, Taiwan
- Coordinates: 22°37′07″N 120°18′39″E
- Completed: 1994

Height
- Architectural: 160.3 metres (526 ft)
- Tip: 160.3 metres (526 ft)

Technical details
- Floor count: 42
- Grounds: 69,815 square metres (751,480 sq ft)

Design and construction
- Architect: Kris Yao

The Han-Hsien International Hotel (traditional Chinese: 寒軒國際大飯店; simplified Chinese: 寒轩国际大饭店; pinyin: Hánxuān Guójì Dà Fàndiàn), also known as Linden Hotel, is a 160.3-metre (526 ft) tall skyscraper located in Lingya District of Kaohsiung, Taiwan. It was completed in 1994 and was designed by Kris Yao. The building is 42 stories tall and has a total floor space of 69,815 m^{2}. When it was completed in 1994, it was the third tallest buildings in Kaohsiung at the time after Chang-Gu World Trade Center and Asia-Pacific Financial Plaza.

== See also ==
- List of tallest buildings in Asia
- List of tallest buildings in Taiwan
- List of tallest buildings in Kaohsiung
