= Vespi Tower =

Skyscraper office building in Qianzhen, Kaohsiung, Taiwan

Vespi Tower 維士比大樓
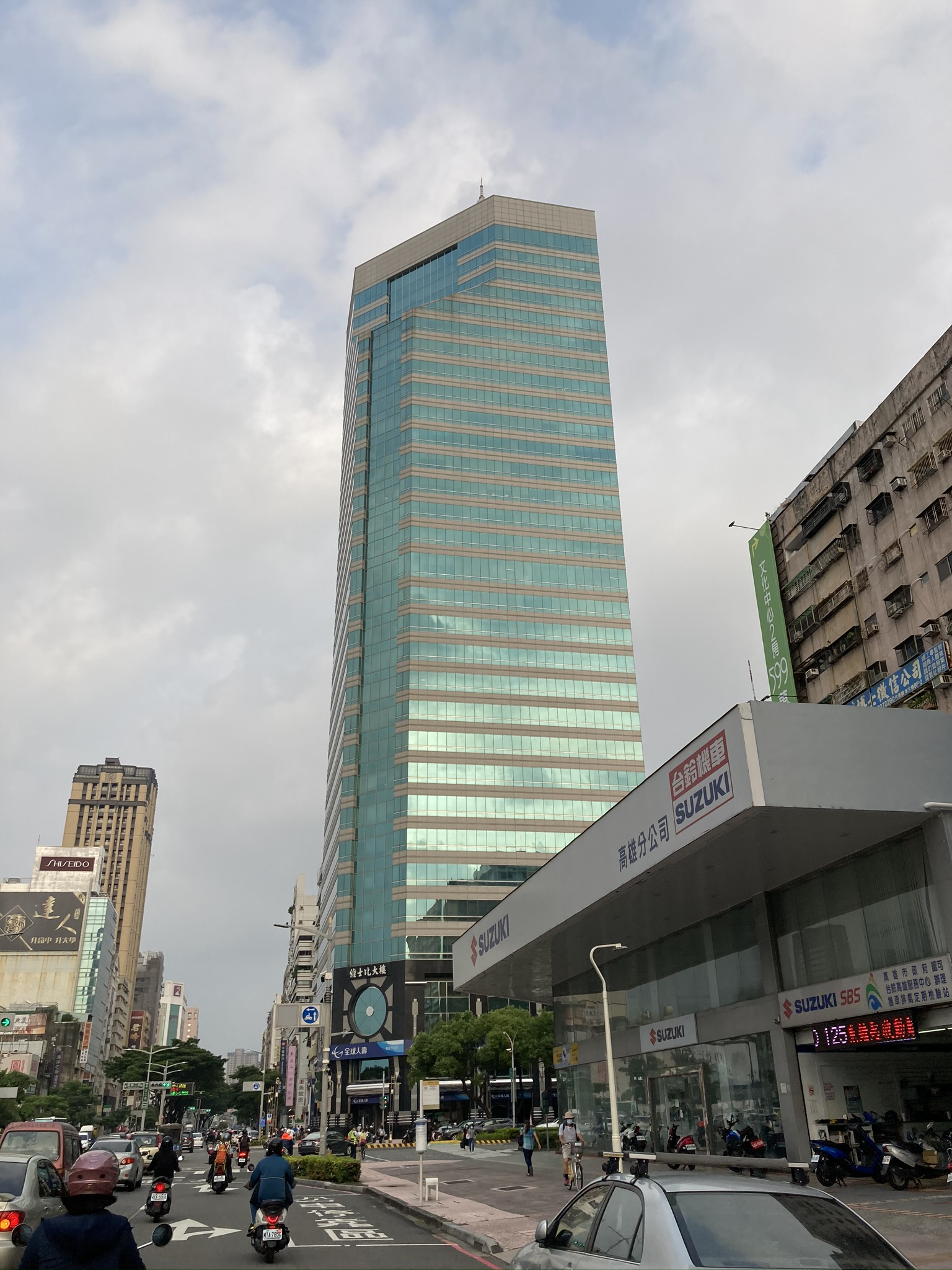
- Interactive map of the Vespi Tower 維士比大樓 area

General information
- Type: Office
- Location: 175 Zhongzheng 2nd Road, Cianjin District, Kaohsiung, Taiwan
- Coordinates: 22°37′49″N 120°18′48″E
- Completed: 1998

Height
- Architectural: 149 m (489 ft)

Technical details
- Floor count: 32

The Vespi Tower (Chinese: 維士比大樓; pinyin: Wéi shì bǐ dàlóu) is a skyscraper office building completed in 1998 in Cianjin District, Kaohsiung, Taiwan. The architectural height of the building is 149 m (489 ft), with a roof height of 130 m (430 ft), and it comprises 32 floors above ground.

== See also ==
- List of tallest buildings in Asia
- List of tallest buildings in Taiwan
- List of tallest buildings in Kaohsiung
