= Hong Fa Temple =

Temple in Xinxing, Kaohsiung, Taiwan

- 宏法寺
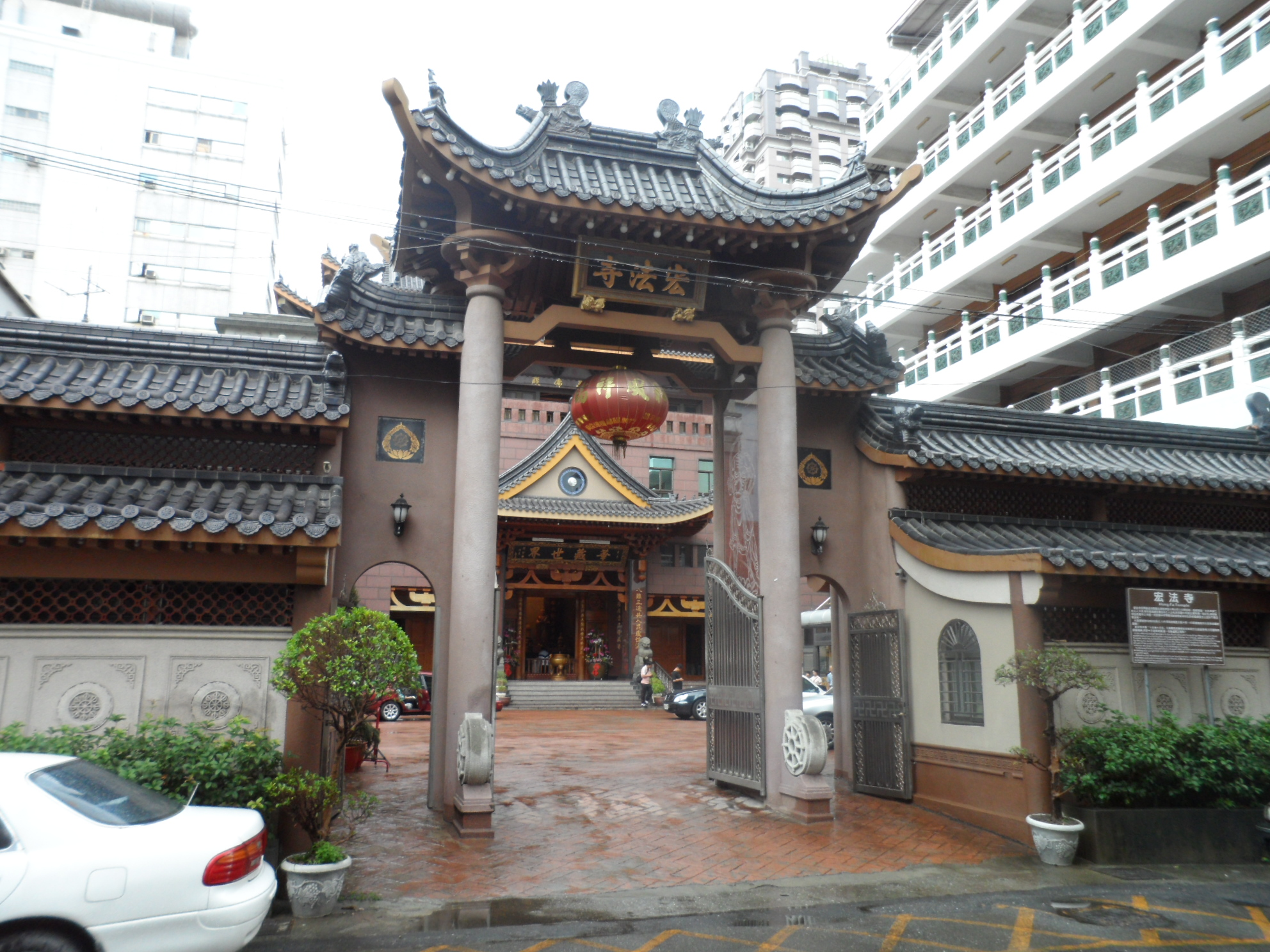

- Location within Kaohsiung

Religion
- Affiliation: Buddhism

Location
- Location: Xinxing, Kaohsiung, Taiwan
- Coordinates: 22.635158°N 120.308054°E

Architecture
- Type: temple
- Completed: 1964

The Hong Fa Temple (Chinese: 宏法寺; pinyin: Hóngfǎ Sì) is a temple in Xinxing, Kaohsiung, Taiwan.

== Transportation ==
The temple is accessible within walking distance North West from Sinyi Elementary School Station of Kaohsiung MRT.

== See also ==
- Buddhism in Taiwan
- List of temples in Taiwan
- List of tourist attractions in Taiwan
