= Soo K. Chan =

Singaporean architect

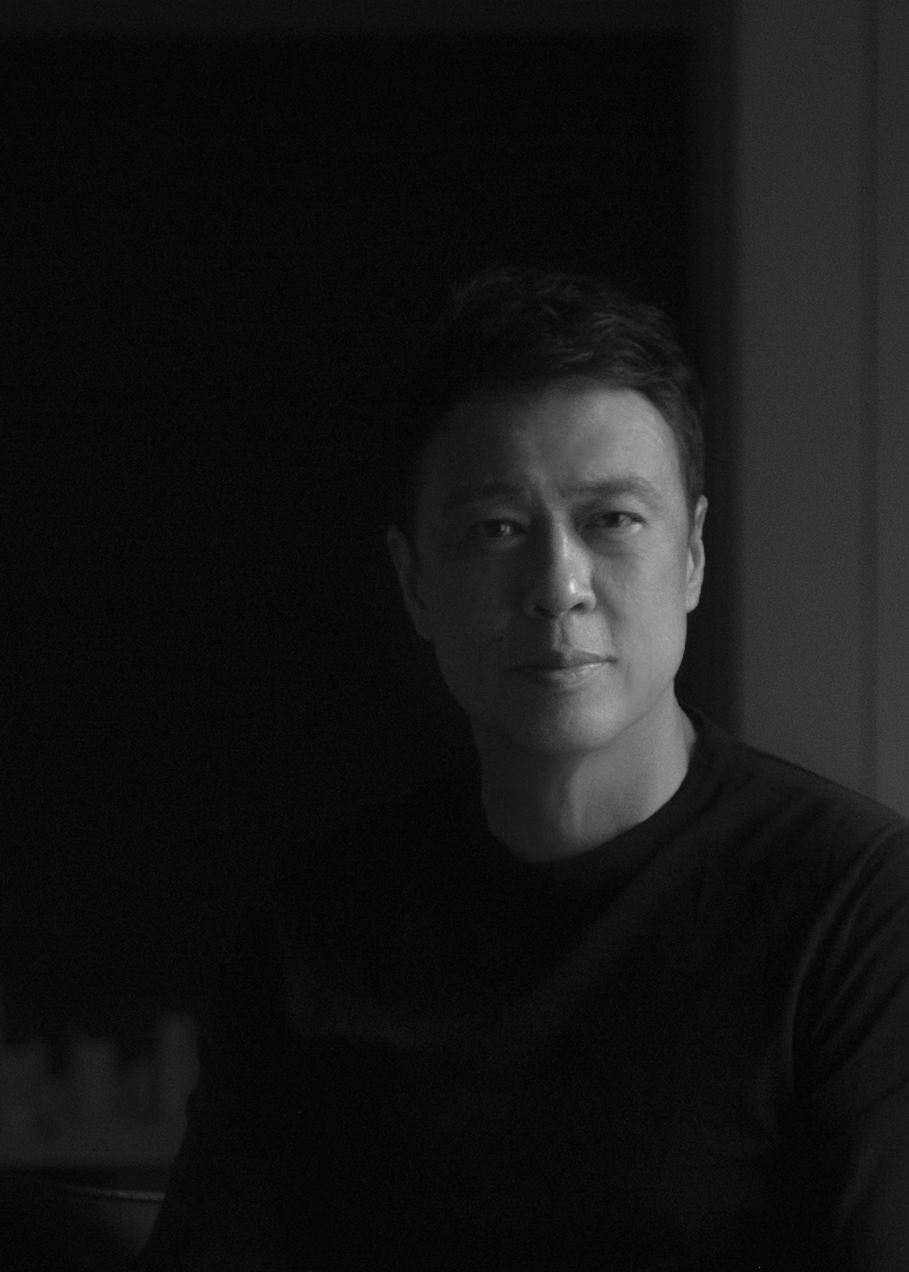
- Born: Soo Khian Chan; 7 January 1962 (age 64); Penang, Federation of Malaya (now Malaysia)
- Education: Washington University in St. Louis; Yale University
- Occupation: Architect
- Practice: SCDA Architects
- Projects: Soori High Line New York, USA 2012; National Design Centre, Singapore, 2011; SkyTerrace@Dawson, Singapore, 2009; Dhoby Ghaut Green, Singapore, 2007; Soori Bali, Indonesia, 2005; OneKL, Malaysia, 2004; Lincoln Modern, Singapore, 1999

Soo Khian Chan (Note: Chinese: 曾仕乾; Pe̍h-ōe-jī: Chan Sū-khiân; pinyin: Zēng Shìqián) (born 7 January 1962) is an architect based in Singapore. He is the founding principal and design director of SCDA Architects Pte Ltd, a multi-disciplinary firm engaging in the practice of architecture and interior, landscape and product design.

== Academic career ==
Chan obtained his Bachelor of Arts degree from Washington University in St. Louis and Master of Architecture degree at Yale University. He has taught and lectured in several international architectural schools including National University of Singapore, Syracuse University, Tamkang University, Taipei, University of Paris and Notre Dame University. He is currently a practicing professor at the National University of Singapore. Chan cites Louis Kahn, Otto Wagner, Le Corbusier, and Mies van der Rohe as design inspirations.

== Other career ==
Chan has served on the Singapore Design Council and the Singapore Design Advisory Panel for the Urban Redevelopment Authority and the Housing Development Board.

He is listed as one of the designers of Poliform and has a line of furniture called Soori.

Chan is also a developer for his debut NYC project Soori High Line New York and is the owner-designer-manager of Soori Bali.

== Personal life ==
Chan was born and raised in Khoo Kongsi, Penang, Malaysia. He currently resides in Singapore with his wife Ling, a designer, and their children.

== Accolades and mentions ==
Chan was the recipient of the inaugural Singapore President's Design Award.

Chan was conferred as a Fellow of the Singapore Institute of Architects in recognition for his standing in the profession and advancement of architecture. His works have been published in international architecture and design journals and books, including Architectural Review, Architectural Record, Interni, Lotus, Monument, World Architecture and SURFACE.

Chan and SCDA projects have also been featured in The New York Times, Wall Street Journal, BBC News, and the Financial Times.

=== Awards received ===
- AIA New York Design Award 2019 (Merit)—Cluny Park Residence, Singapore
- Singapore President's Design Award 2016—National Design Centre, Singapore
- RIBA Award for International Excellence 2016—Skyterrace@Dawson, Singapore
- Singapore President's Design Award—Designer of the Year 2006
- RIBA Worldwide Awards 2005—Lincoln Modern, Singapore
