= Guo-Yan Building BC =

Skyscraper in Lingya, Kaohsiung, Taiwan

Guo-Yan Building BC 國揚國硯
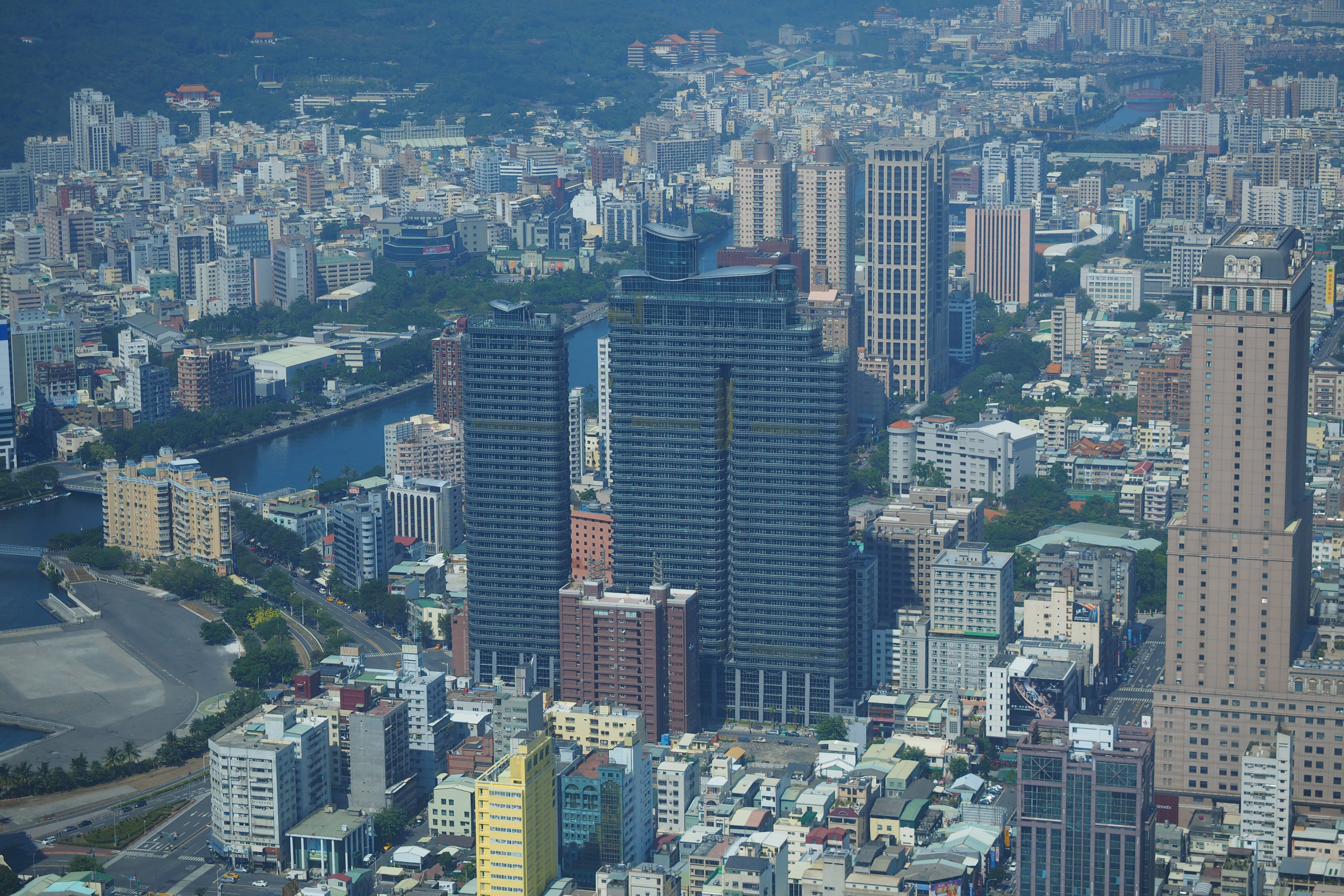
- Interactive map of the Guo-Yan Building BC 國揚國硯 area

General information
- Status: Completed
- Type: Residential
- Location: Lingya District, Kaohsiung, Taiwan
- Coordinates: 22°37′12″N 120°17′24″E
- Construction started: 2010
- Completed: 2013

Height
- Architectural: 171 metres (561 ft)
- Tip: 174.8 metres (573 ft)

Technical details
- Floor count: 41
- Floor area: 82,499 m^{2} (888,010 sq ft)

The Guo-Yan Building BC (Chinese: 國揚國硯; pinyin: Guó yáng guó yàn) is a residential skyscraper located in Lingya District, Kaohsiung, Taiwan. As of December 2020, it is the fifth tallest building in Kaohsiung and the 20th tallest in Taiwan. The height of the building is 171 m (561 ft), the floor area is 82,499 m^{2} (888,010 sq ft), and it comprises 41 floors above ground, as well as five basement levels.

== See also ==
- List of tallest buildings in Taiwan
- List of tallest buildings in Kaohsiung
