= King's Town Hyatt =

Residential skyscraper in Qianjin, Kaohsiung, Taiwan

King's Town Hyatt 京城凱悅
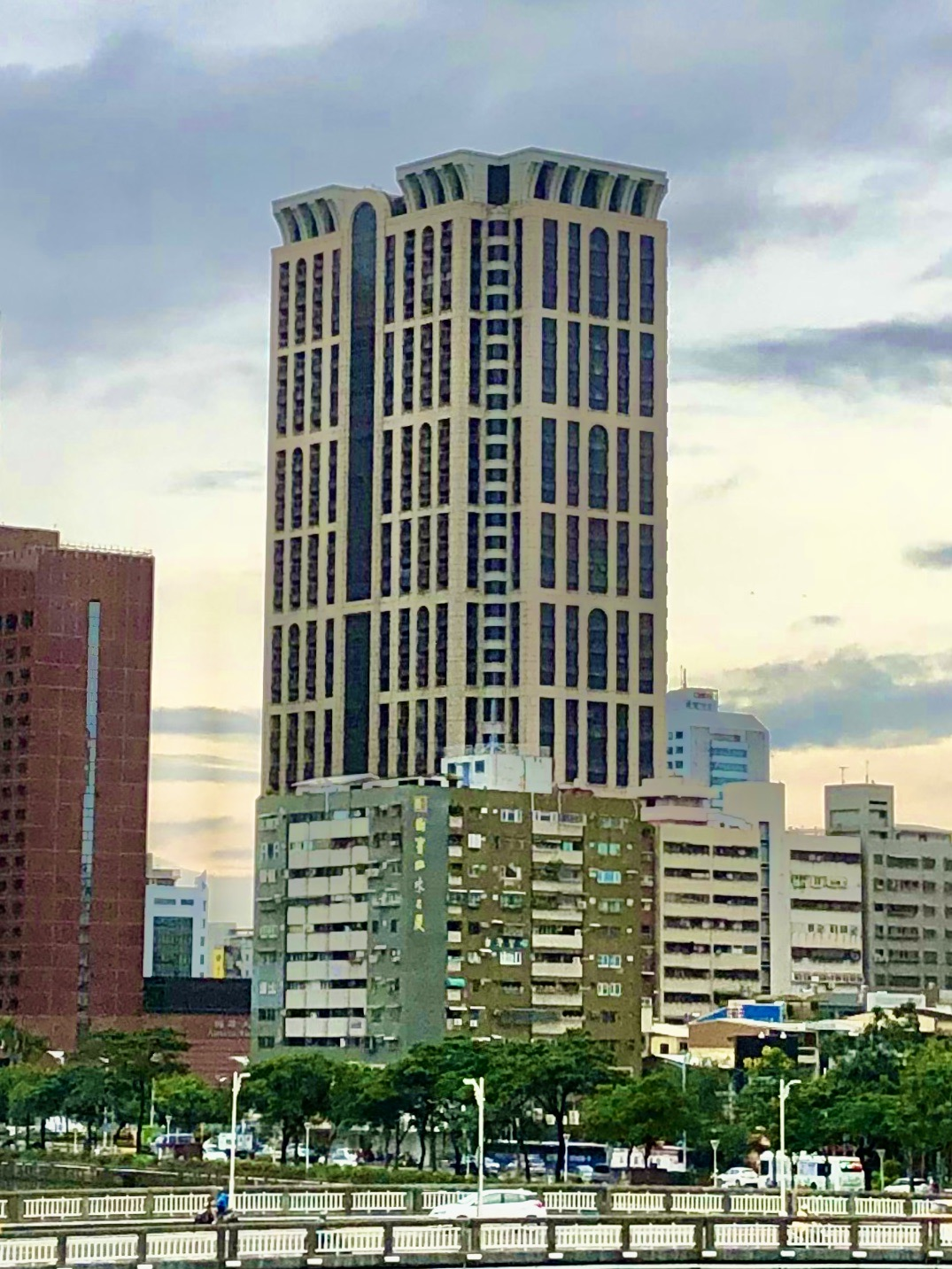
- Interactive map of the King's Town Hyatt 京城凱悅 area

General information
- Status: Completed
- Type: Residential
- Location: No. 200, Minsheng 2nd Road, Qianjin District, Kaohsiung, Taiwan
- Coordinates: 22.624765203859155°N 120.29141362631323°E
- Construction started: 2005
- Completed: 2009

Height
- Architectural: 137 m (449 ft)

Technical details
- Floor count: 35 above ground 5 below ground
- Floor area: 55,700 m^{2} (600,000 sq ft)

Design and construction
- Architect: P&T Group

King's Town Hyatt (Chinese: 京城凱悅; pinyin: Jīngchéng Kǎiyuè) is a 35-story, 137 m (449 ft) tall residential skyscraper located in Qianjin District, Kaohsiung, Taiwan. Construction of the skyscraper began in 2005 and it was completed in 2009. Designed by the Hong Kong based architectural firm P&T Group, the residential building provides 174 units of luxury apartments, with facilities such as a swimming pool, banquet hall, fitness center and a sky lounge on its topmost floor. As of December 2021, it is the 23rd tallest building in Kaohsiung.

== See also ==
- List of tallest buildings in Taiwan
- List of tallest buildings in Kaohsiung
- Kingtown King Park
