= Water Tower Park =

Park in Lingya, Kaohsiung, Taiwan

- 自來水公園
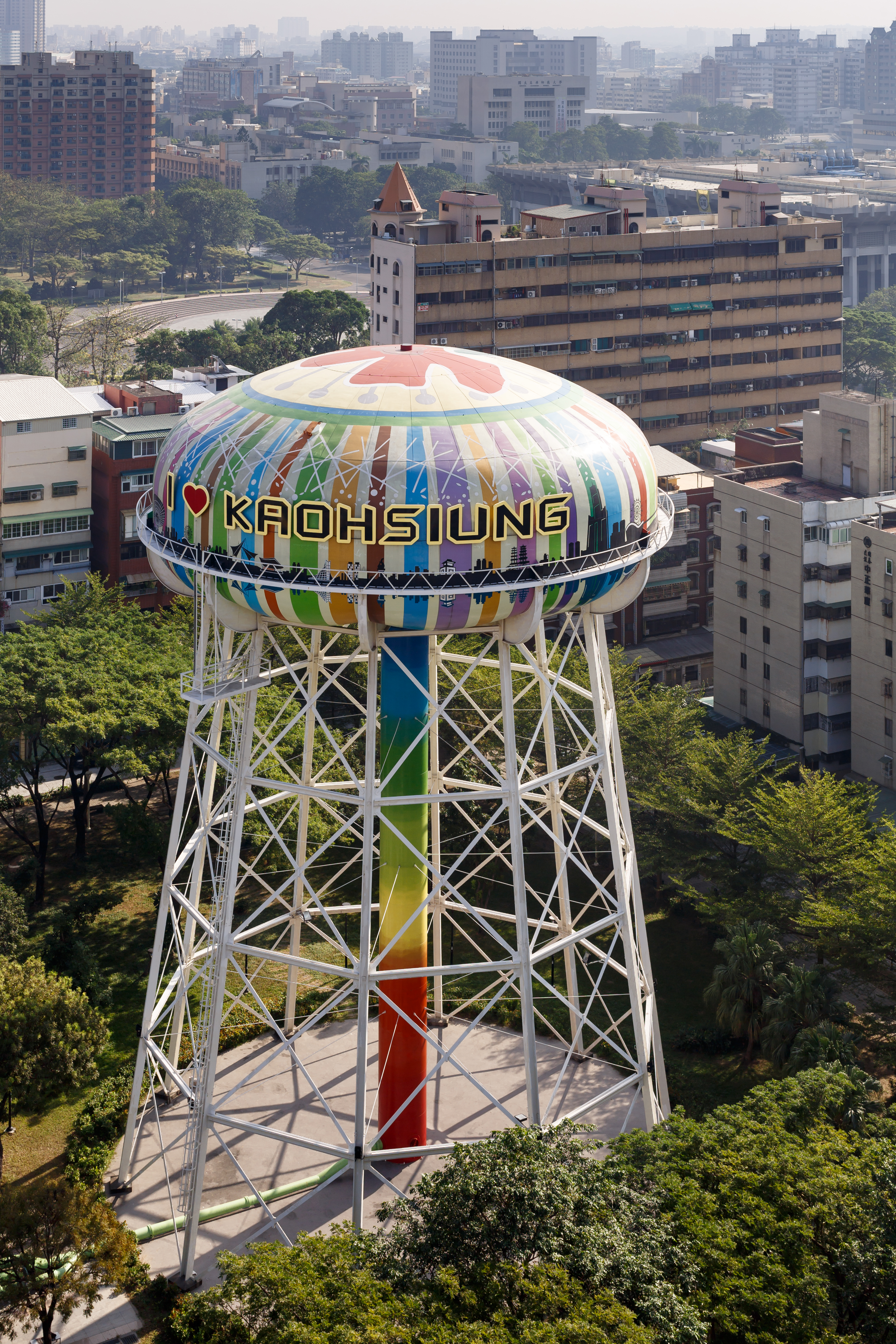
- Interactive map of Water Tower Park
- Type: park
- Location: Lingya, Kaohsiung, Taiwan
- Coordinates: 22°37′38.3″N 120°18′53.6″E
- Public transit: Cultural Center Station

The Water Tower Park (traditional Chinese: 自來水公園; simplified Chinese: 自来水公园; pinyin: Zìláishuǐ Gōngyuán) is a park in Lingya District, Kaohsiung, Taiwan.

== History ==
The water tower was constructed in the 1960s.

== Architecture ==
The main entrance of the park is shown by the arch shaped entrance located at the north east corner. It features optical fiber strips connected to a glass mosaic map of Kaohsiung. The sidewalk features plantation and LED lights. The existing water piping is painted and transformed into installation art to accentuate the theme of the park.

== Technical specifications ==
The water tower stands at a height of 38 meters.

== Transportation ==
The park is accessible within walking distance south west of Cultural Center Station of Kaohsiung Metro.

== See also ==
- List of parks in Taiwan
