= Cathay Shi-Wei Financial Center =

Skyscraper office building in Lingya, Kaohsiung, Taiwan

Cathay Shi-Wei Financial Center 國泰四維財經大樓
- Interactive map of the Cathay Shi-Wei Financial Center 國泰四維財經大樓 area

General information
- Status: Completed
- Type: Office building
- Classification: Office
- Location: No. 6, Siwei 3rd Road, Lingya District, Kaohsiung, Taiwan
- Coordinates: 22°37′11.83″N 120°18′39.89″E
- Construction started: 1999
- Completed: 2001

Height
- Roof: 126.2 m (414 ft)

Technical details
- Floor count: 27

The Cathay Shi-Wei Financial Center (Chinese: 國泰四維財經大樓) is a 27-story, 126.2 metres (414 ft) skyscraper office building completed in 2001 in Lingya District, Kaohsiung, Taiwan. The plan of Cathay Shi-Wei Financial Center is a horizontal T shape, forming a square and rectangular structure respectively. The space connected by the two areas serves as the building's elevator equipment, stairs, and logistics equipment. The building is covered with pink tiles and reinforced glued heat-insulating glass. Located in close proximity to the Kaohsiung City Government, the building houses the Kaohsiung branch of Mitsubishi Electric.

== See also ==
- List of tallest buildings in Taiwan
- List of tallest buildings in Kaohsiung
