= Kingtown King Park =

Residential skyscraper in Gushan, Kaohsiung, Taiwan

- 京城 King Park
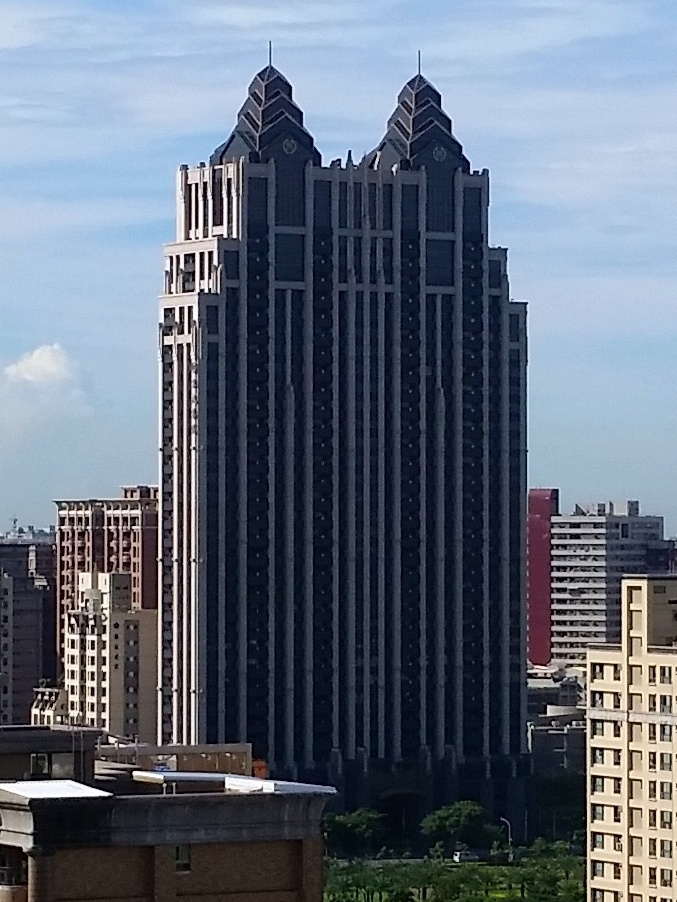
- Interactive map of the Kingtown King Park area

General information
- Status: Completed
- Type: Residential
- Location: No. 89, Shennong Road, Gushan District, Kaohsiung, Taiwan
- Coordinates: 22.65782884850936°N 120.30074016868573°E
- Completed: 2016

Height
- Architectural: 154 m (505 ft)

Technical details
- Floor count: 36

The Kingtown King Park, also known as King's Residence (Chinese: 京城 King Park; pinyin: Jīngchéng King Park), is a residential skyscraper located in Gushan District, Kaohsiung, Taiwan. It was completed in 2016 and houses 118 apartment units. As of March 2025, it is the 10th tallest building in Kaohsiung. The height of the building is 154 m (505 ft), and it comprises 36 floors above ground, as well as five basement levels.

== See also ==
- List of tallest buildings in Taiwan
- List of tallest buildings in Kaohsiung
- King's Town Hyatt
