= Sinsing District, Kaohsiung =

District in Kaohsiung, Taiwan

Coordinates: 22°37′29″N 120°18′4.7″E

Sinsing 新興區 Xinxing
- District
- Sinsing District
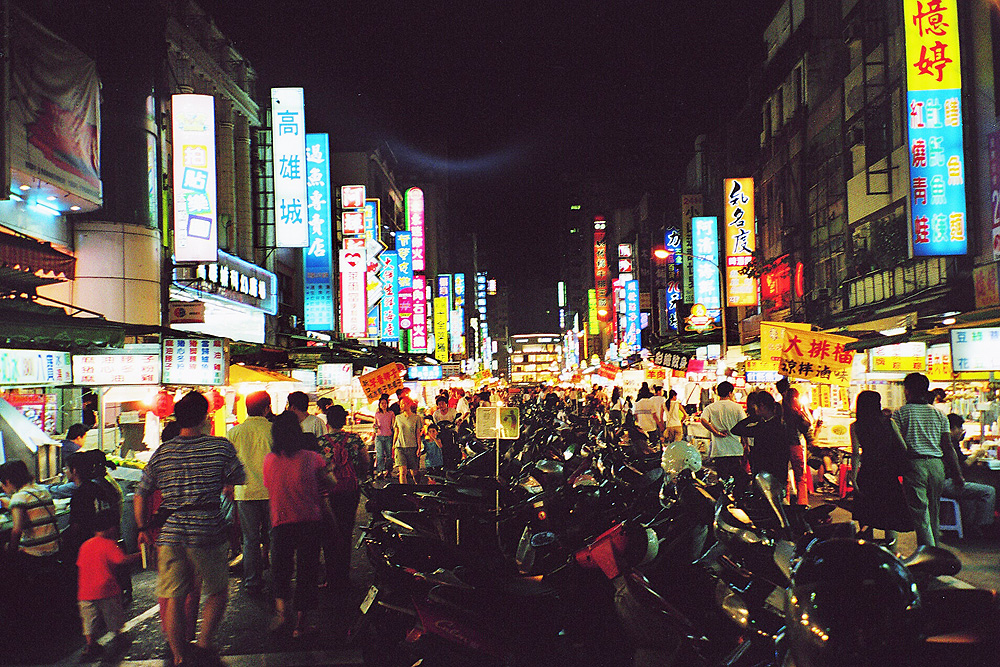
- Sinsing District

- 高雄市新興區公所; SINSING DISTRICT OFFICE; KAOHSIUNG CITY SINSING

- Sinsing District in Kaohsiung City
- Country: Taiwan
- Region: Southern Taiwan

Population (October 2023)
  - Total: 49,478
- Website: hsingsin.kcg.gov.tw/en/

Sinsing District (Chinese: 新興區; Hanyu Pinyin: Xīnxīng Qū; Tongyong Pinyin: Sinsing Cyu; Wade–Giles: Hsin^{1}-hsing^{1} Ch'ü^{1}) is a downtown district of Kaohsiung City, Taiwan.

== Name ==
Sinsing means new prosperity in Mandarin Chinese.

== History ==
Sinsing used to be called Tāi-káng-po͘ (Chinese: 大港埔) in early days where it was filled with endless wilderness before. During the Japanese rule of Taiwan, residents in the area used to make a living from farming and lived a simple life. Due to the nature of agriculture industry, people deployed water conservation methods in the area, thus irrigation system was spread all over the area. Fields became fertile and they grew rice, sweet potato, sugarcane or corn.

After the handover of Taiwan from Japan to the Republic of China in 1945, the area grew gradually and was renamed Sinsing District.

== Administrative divisions ==
Map of villages in Sinsing District

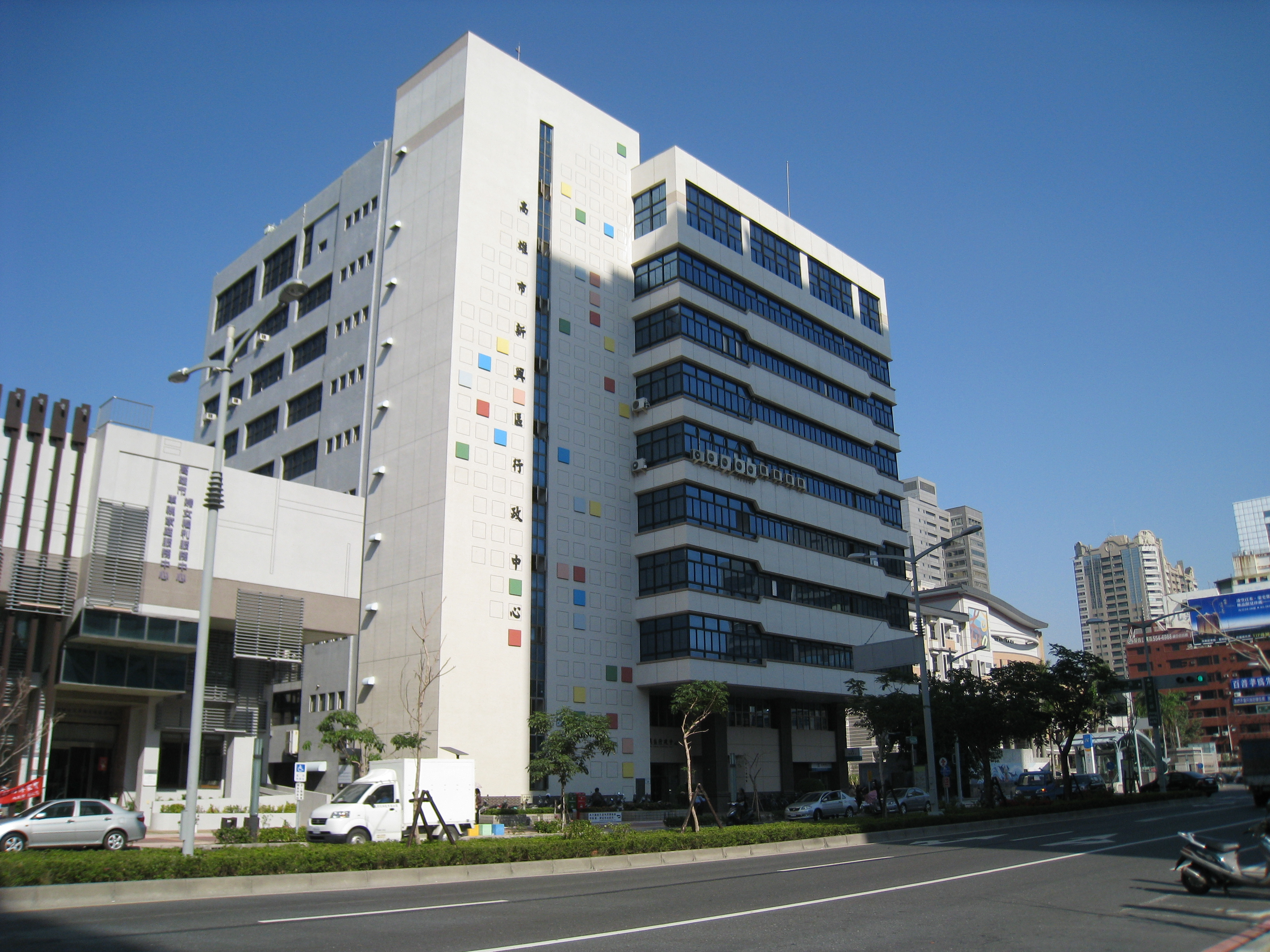
Sinsing District Office

The district consists of Haoran, Zhencheng, Desheng, Zhenhua, Zhengqi, Dezheng, Rensheng, Dewang, Huasheng, Jiaoyuan, Yongning, Yuheng, Shunchang, Wenchang, Guangyao, Xingchang, Kaiping, Chenggong, Xinjiang, Liming, Aiping, Nangang, Zhongtung, Mingzhuang, Daming, Qiushan, Zhangyi, Jianxing, Jianhua, Hanmin, Rongzhi and Tungpo Village.

== Tourist attractions ==
- Hong Fa Temple (宏法寺)
- Liuhe Night Market
- Dingxin Park
- Hsin Chueh Chian Shopping Area
- Jhongsiao Park
- Nanhua Shopping Center
- Park Number 11
- Sinsing Park
- Old Japanese Villa逍遙園
