= Pier 2 =

Pier 2 or Pier-2 may refer to:

- Pier 2 (Brooklyn)
- Pier 2, Halifax
- Pier 2, Seattle
- Pier-2 Art Center

== See also ==
- Dayi Pier-2 light rail station
- Penglai Pier-2 light rail station
