= Great Harbor Bridge =

Swing bridge in Yancheng, Kaohsiung, Taiwan

Great Harbor Bridge 大港橋
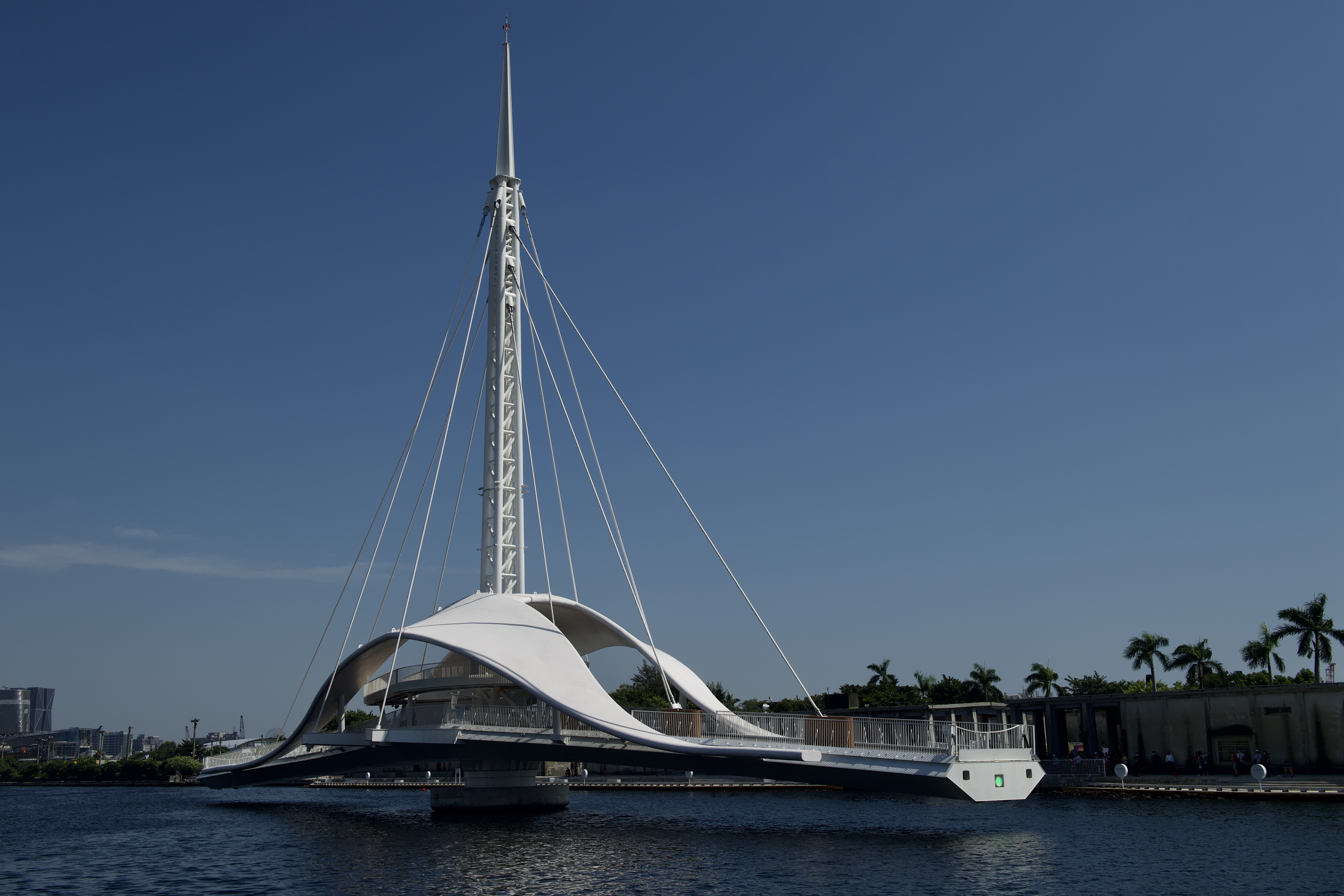
- Great Harbor Bridge during its rotation
- Coordinates: 22°37′3.72″N 120°17′1.68″E
- Crosses: Port of Kaohsiung Basin Dock No.3
- Locale: Yancheng, Kaohsiung, Taiwan

Characteristics
- Design: swing bridge
- Total length: 109.5 metres (359 ft)
- Width: 5 metres (16 ft)~11 metres (36 ft)

History
- Construction cost: NT$320 million
- Opened: July 6, 2020

Location
- Interactive map of Great Harbor Bridge

The Great Harbor Bridge (traditional Chinese: 大港橋; simplified Chinese: 大港桥; pinyin: Dàgǎng Qiáo) is a pedestrian bridge in Yancheng District, Kaohsiung, Taiwan. It is the first horizontally rotating landscape bridge in Taiwan and the longest cross-port rotating bridge in Asia.

== History ==
The bridge started construction on September 22, 2018, and was inaugurated on July 6, 2020.

The bridge spans across Port of Kaohsiung Basin Dock No.3, connecting the Pier-2 Art Center to the Penglai Commercial Area. It allows visitors to walk directly across from the art exhibitions and the Dayi Pier-2 Station to the commercial area, where the shops and restaurants are located. The bridge reduces the original walking time between the two sides of the dock from 30 minutes to 3 minutes.

The bridge can accommodate 550 people and cyclists at the same time. The rotation operation takes around 5 minutes for each 90-degree swing. When the bridge is fully opened, there would be a 40-meter-wide channel for the ships’ passage.

The arch of the bridge is made of fibreglass reinforced plastic (FRP), which is the same material used in the fibreglass hull of luxury yachts. This material was chosen as to showcase the yacht manufacturing industry in the Port of Kaohsiung, hence the arch of the bridge was manufactured by Atech Composites of Horizon Group, who is a prominent yacht manufacturer based in Kaohsiung.

== Gallery ==
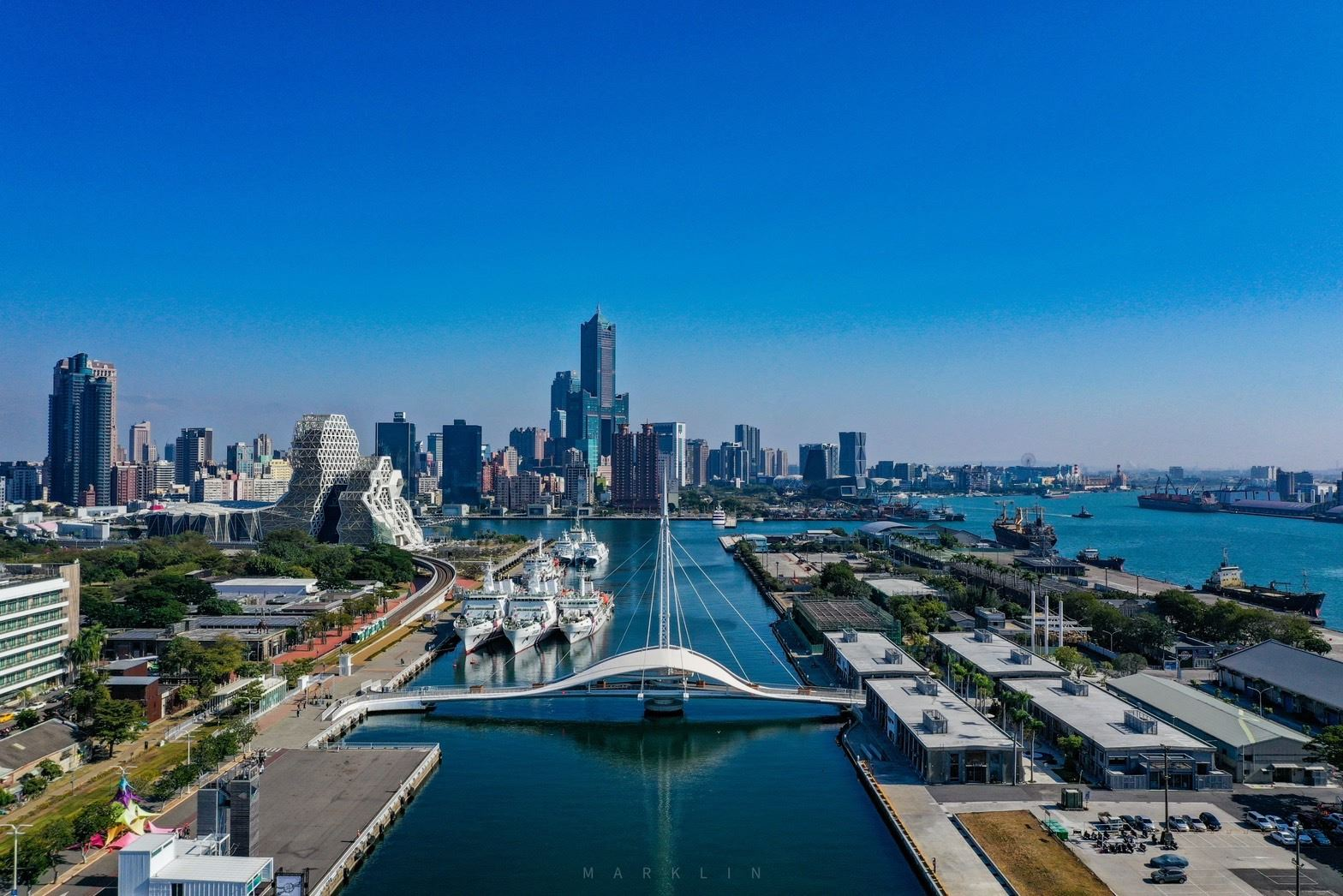
Kaohsiung skyline with the Great Harbor Bridge

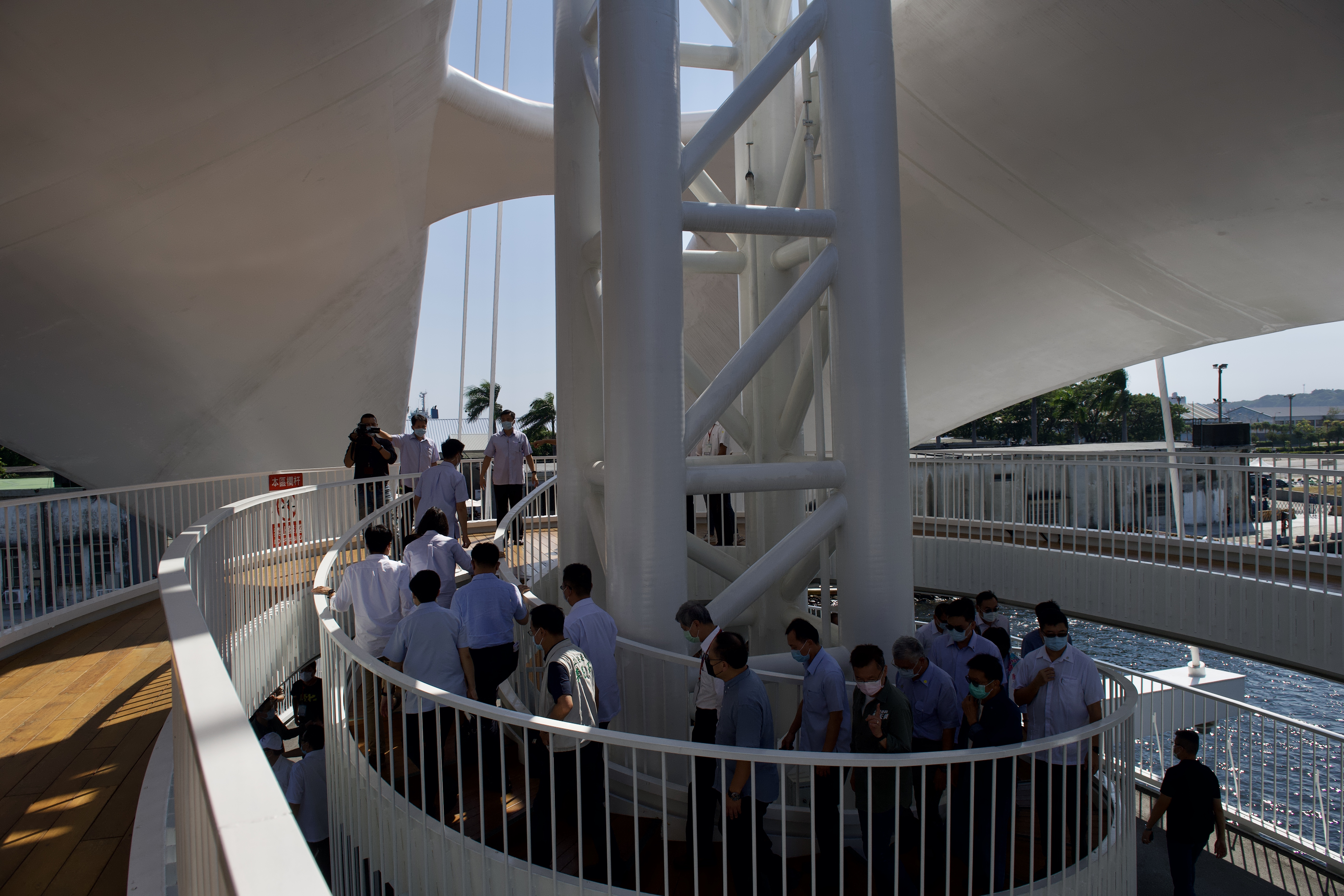
Viewing platform above the bridge

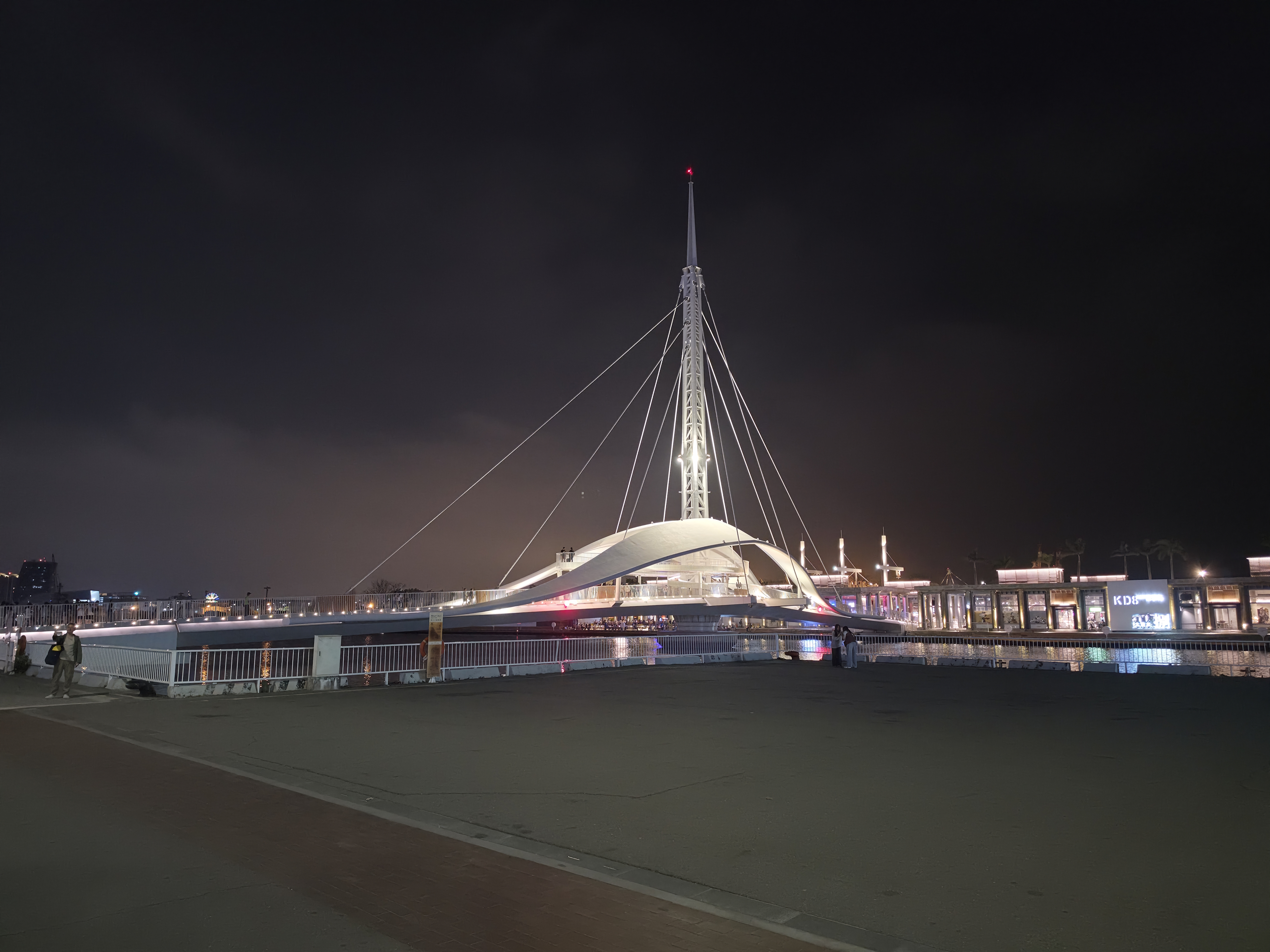
Great Harbor Bridge at dusk, viewed from the waterfront promenade

== See also ==
- List of bridges in Taiwan
