= Taiwan Love Story⁵ =

2024 video game

- The game's intro in Chinese. Clockwise from centre: Amy Lin, Lil' Blu, Zoe Hai, Sarah Wang, and Amanda Zhang
- Developers: HappyMonster; Mr.Chihua; Maker
- Publishers: LewdLoco; Mango Party
- Director: Chihuahua
- Producer: Siupong (Note: Chinese: 蕭邦仲, also known as the pen name "Kametou Hoyaro" (龜頭生野郎))
- Designer: Siupong
- Programmer: Maker
- Artist: Siupong
- Writer: Siupong
- Composers: Neon Voice, SenSonus Records
- Engine: RPG Maker
- Platform: Windows (Steam)
- Release: 18 Dec 2024
- Genre: Dating sim
- Mode: Single-player

Taiwan Love Story⁵ (Chinese: 臺灣戀愛物語⁵) is an adult dating sim released in 2024, developed by HappyMonster, Mr. Chihua, and Maker, and published by LewdLoco and Mango Party. The game was produced by Siupong. The story follows a Taiwanese American called David, who attempts to build a relationship with the main heroines in Taiwan. Critics have praised the game for its depiction of Taiwan and its art style.

== Gameplay ==
A delivery mini-game in the game. In the mini-game, cars only notify players by honking when switching lanes

Taiwan Love Story⁵ is a dating sim in which the player takes the role of David Lee (Note: The name can be renamed), a Taiwanese-American studying at a university in Taiwan. Each round of the game covers one week at a time, beginning on Valentine's Day of the first year and ending on the same day next year.

The goal is to raise the affection of one of the five heroines to a maximum of 8 by arranging dates and improving David's abilities with power and money. Power can be increased by purchasing items, while money can be earned by writing a thesis and doing deliveries. The ability can be retained in the next game when replaying.

Activities during the date include catching toys in claw machine, shooting balloons, watching films, and visiting special locations. Although relationships with all heroines might be developed over the year, only one heroine's ending can be chosen in a game.

== Plot ==
David Lee is a Taiwanese-American college student majoring in "humanities psychology" at a university in Taiwan. At school, David is a researcher working with a renowned professor on relationship development. As part of his research, David meets five heroines at a campsite.

=== Characters ===
David Lee (王大衛)
The protagonist, David is a Taiwanese-American who studied in Taiwan. As part of his research, he meets the main heroines at a campsite and tries to find the one who kissed him in his dream.
Ryan Yang (楊宇威)
Ryan is David's friend who is a huge VTuber fan. At the campsite, he mistakenly identified David as his favourite VTuber, whom he had seen in a dream, and kissed him. Classmates mistakenly believed that Ryan had romantic feelings for David after the kissing video spread. As a result, Ryan ends up without a girlfriend, and harasses David when he knows David has one on Valentine's Day. In the end, Ryan befriends a policewoman who investigated his behaviour.
Amy Lin (林姿婷)
Voiced by: Suiyobi (Chinese), Hiyori Amaki (Japanese)
Amy is an honest but clumsy insurance broker works in Eastern District, Taipei. Noticing her struggles at work, David joined her company to help. Impressed by David's remarkable working skills, Amy begins following his lead by contacting clients at nightclubs. The couple fought when David discovered that Amy had been sexually harassed there. Realising that he must care for her feelings when helping, David protected Amy from an attempted rape and suggested changing her work approach. They also sleep together at a hotel near Taipei 101, and Amy's career improved after David's advice. Amy's route ends at the campsite where they first met.
In earlier development, there were two design drafts for Amy: a thinner one and a more developed one. While Siupong preferred a developed design, he eventually chose a thinner draft after considering her office lady style. He also stated that Amy is his favourite character in the game.
Lil' Blu (小咘) (Note: The surname is Huang according to a dialogue in the game, but her real name remains unknown.)
Voiced by: Risako Kurihara (Chinese), Yutaka Yuuki (Japanese)
Lil' Blu is a Betel nut beauty from Taichung with a rough way of speaking, but is passionate underneath. As a daughter of a local gangster, Blu was bullied and once dated a model student who betrayed her in middle school, leaving her not believing in love until she met David. Attracted by his honesty, Blu developed a deeper relationship, but was upset after an argument. While dating another man online, she discovers the man is the student who betrayed her; he attempts to rape her during the date, until David stops him. As a result, they have decided to get back together. The route ends with their visit to Xinshe, Taichung.
Sarah Wang (王秋霞)
Voiced by: Saye (Chinese), Ichi Hatori (Japanese)
Sarah was a restaurant owner in Tainan with her husband who passed away at the beginning of the story. As their relationship developed, David helped run the restaurant after Sarah was injured, but he was injured as well. Afraid of losing her loved one, Sarah left David. Wanting to win her back, David confesses his feelings to her on TV. The story ends with a romantic walk on an old Tainan street.
Siupong suggested that Sarah was based on a restaurant owner whom he often visits.
Amanda Zhang (張書嫚)
Voiced by: Rain (Chinese), Shizuku Hoshiai (Japanese)
Amanda is the daughter of a prominent business owner based in Kaohsiung. She loves singing and visiting Pier-2 Art Center, and dreams of becoming a singer, but her father constantly opposes it, so she hides her dream until David encourages her to pursue it again. When her first album was released, Amanda's father forced her to accept an arranged marriage, but David rescued her before she accepted. They later plan a concert with a business strategy, and Amanda's father finally accepts Amanda's dream and appoints David as his successor. The route ends with the couple walking along Love River.
Zoe Hai (海蘇兒)
Voiced by: Yawai (Chinese), Kiiro Tsukino (Japanese)
Zoe is aalcoholic diver from Penghu. In her childhood, Zoe's father had disappeared while rescuing a drowning person, and Zoe's mother waited for him for years. As a result, Zoe never left her home without her mother. When Zoe and David dive into the sea where her father disappeared, they confirmed that Zoe's father has died, allowing Zoe and her mother to find peace. She later participated in diving competitions and became a popular sports star.

== Development ==
In August 2023, HappyMonster and SlothGamer, developers of Waifu Fighter, announced that they are developing a new game called Taiwan Love Story⁵, and the game's producer is Siupong. That same year, Siupong designed drafts for four heroines except Amanda Zhang, whose design was released in May 2024.

In an interview, Siupong mentioned his background as a Hong Kong person living in Taiwan, letting him discover aspects foreigners find interesting but locals may overlook. He believes that when emphasising aspects with a fresh perspective, exporting local culture to foreign markets can be easier. The development team conducted considerable research for the purpose. Siupong also stated that the game was designed for foreign players unfamiliar with Taiwan. Developers also indicated that the game is influenced by Taiwanese television drama and online games. One of the examples is the game's theme song, I Want to Say I Love You Loudly (我要大聲說喜歡你).

== Release ==
A demo game of Taiwan Love Story⁵ was released at G-EIGHT in December 2023. On 26 July 2024, LewdLoco and Mango Party announced that the game will be released on 19 December 2024, with adult content provided in a free DLC. The playing time is estimated to be eight to ten hours. A further demo was released at Tokyo Game Show in September 2024. The game was released on 19 December 2024 on time.

A Japanese Dub was announced by the developer on 4 March 2025. A spin-off novel and a setting book were also announced on 24 June.

== Reception ==
Y-li on 4gamers pointed out that although the game's artwork is gorgeous compared to real life Taiwan, it can create a player's interest in Taiwanese culture. He also stated that although its plot was simple, twists can successfully build players' emotions, and expressed regret that the story was too short.

Yaju Senpai on Murax2 praises Siupong's erotic artwork, noting that despite not being extensive in quantity, their style is detailed, stimulating in visual, and paired with arousing and teasing dialogue. Based on these observations, he recommends the game to players who value storytelling or art style and interested in Taiwanese culture.

Both also praise the depiction of Taiwan, which can make Taiwanese players "smile and understand". They also take a delivery mini-game as an example of this. Despite the game depicting transportation in Taiwan well, they comment that the game is too hard and hurts the playing experience.
