= Kaohsiung Film Archive =

Archive in Yancheng, Kaohsiung, Taiwan

- 高雄市電影館
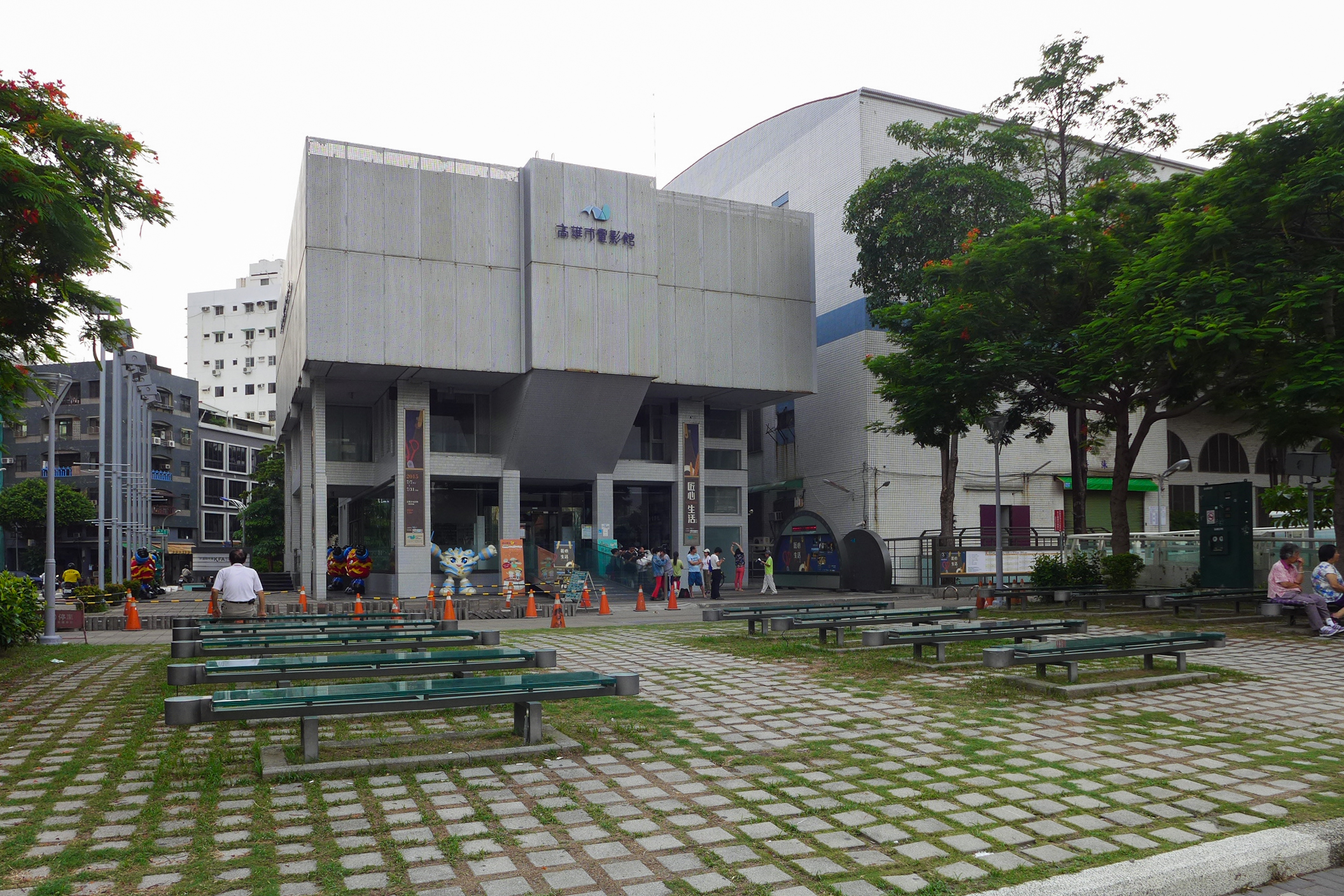
- Interactive map of Kaohsiung Film Archive
- Location: Yancheng, Kaohsiung, Taiwan
- Coordinates: 22°37′39.5″N 120°17′12.6″E
- Operator: Liu Shiu-ying (Director)
- Type: archive

Construction
- Opened: 2001

Website
- Official website

The Kaohsiung Film Archive (KFA; traditional Chinese: 高雄市電影館; simplified Chinese: 高雄市电影馆; pinyin: Gāoxióng Shì Diànyǐng Guǎn) is a movie center in Yancheng District, Kaohsiung, Taiwan.

== History ==
Kaohsiung Film Archive was established in 2001. The building of Kaohsiung Film Archive was originally used as the campus building of Yancheng Junior High School and public service station of Kuomintang. It was then transferred to Kaohsiung City Chinese Orchestra. Once the orchestra had moved to Kaohsiung City Music Hall, the building was left idle. After confirming the location at the building, Kaohsiung Mayor Frank Hsieh and his team searched for financial support and subsidy from the Executive Yuan and finally obtained subsidy from the Ministry of the Interior and Council for Cultural Affairs.

== Architecture ==
Kaohsiung Film Archive was designed based on the concept of image design and it looks like a large screen projecting the busy city.

== Activities ==
Kaohsiung Film Archive regularly organizes film-related activities all year round. It plays free diversified artistic films every day.

== Transportation ==
The center is accessible within walking distance north east of Yanchengpu Station of Kaohsiung Metro.

== See also ==
- List of tourist attractions in Taiwan
