= Penglai Pier-2 light rail station =

Light rail station in Kaohsiung, Taiwan

Coordinates: 22.6205°N 120.2799°E

Penglai Pier-2 C13 駁二蓬萊站
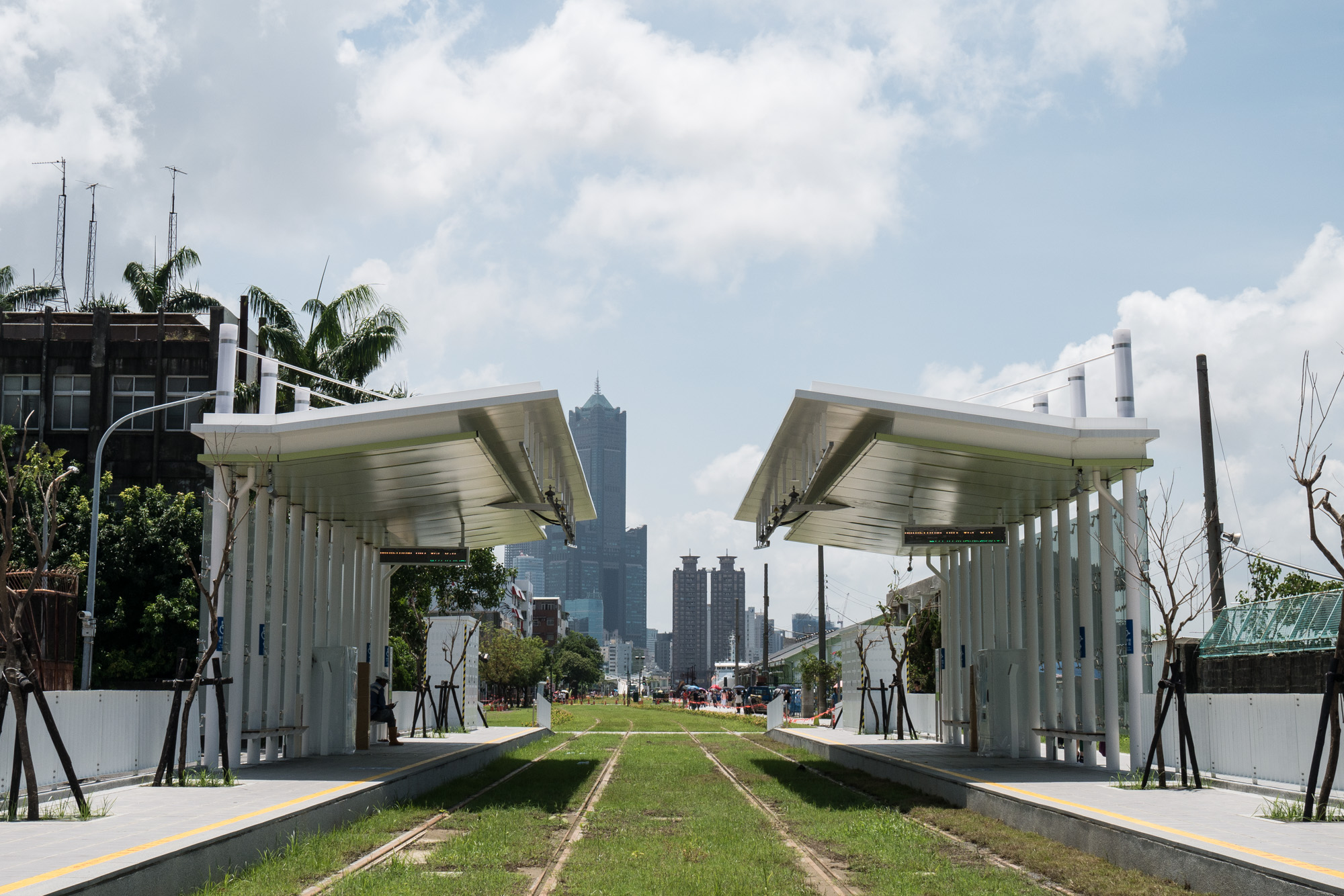

General information
- Location: Yancheng, Kaohsiung; Taiwan
- Operated by: Kaohsiung Rapid Transit Corporation
- Line: Circular line
- Platforms: 2 side platforms
- Connections: Bus stop

Construction
- Structure type: At-grade
- Accessible: Yes

Other information
- Station code: C13

History
- Opened: October 16, 2015

Services
Preceding station	Kaohsiung Metro	Following station
Dayi Pier-2 outer loop / anticlockwise	Circular light rail	Hamasen inner loop / clockwise
Location

Penglai Pier-2 (Chinese: 駁二蓬萊站; pinyin: Bóèr Pénglái) is a light rail station of the Circular Line of the Kaohsiung rapid transit system. It is located in Yancheng District, Kaohsiung, Taiwan.

== Station overview ==
This is a street-level station with two side platforms. It is located inside Pier-2 Art Center.

== Station layout ==
Street level	Side platform
Street level	← Circular light rail toward Hamasen
Street level	→ Circular light rail toward Lizihnei (Dayi Pier-2)
Street level	Side platform

== Around the station ==
- Pier-2 Art Center
- Penglai Area of The Pier-2 Art Center
- Hamasen Museum of Taiwan Railway
- Kaohsiung Harbor Museum
- Kaohsiung Experimental Theater
- Kaohsiung Harbor No.2 Wharf
- Arch of Kaohsiung Port
- Yanchengpu Night Market
