= K.R.T. Girls =

Transportation mascots in Taiwan

The K.R.T. Girls, from left to right: Ann, Sora, Emelia and Nana.

The K.R.T. Girls (Chinese: 高捷少女; pinyin: Gāo Jié Shàonǚ) are four anime-styled characters that serve as mascots for the Kaohsiung Mass Rapid Transit, a rapid transit system which covers metropolitan Kaohsiung, Taiwan. The girls consist of Sora (小穹), who is depicted as a station worker at Yanchengpu Station; Amelia (艾米莉亞), a half-Taiwanese, half-German girl who works as a train driver; Ann (婕兒), a train mechanic; and Nana (耐耐), a Vocaloid-powered train announcer.

Drawn in the "moe" art style popular throughout the region and Japan, the first of the girls was introduced in November 2014. They have since been the focus of various promotional efforts by the metro system, through the mediums of songs, posters, merchandise, as well as social media. A light novel and visual novel featuring the girls have also been produced. Riders of the system, as well as internet commentators, have reviewed the characters positively, with many finding them to be cute. Designed to be iconic representations of animated comics, the girls have brought in revenue of NT$2 million (US$61,576) in just seven months to the KMRT through merchandising.

== The girls ==
The K.R.T. Girls are composed of four mascots. By order of their date of introduction, they are:

- Sora, also spelled Siao Chung (Chinese: 小穹), who is depicted as a station attendant at Yanchengpu Station, located on the KMRT Orange Line. She was debuted at a two-day event for independent comic and video game creators in Kaohsiung in November 2014. Her official biography lists her as being 163 centimetres (64 in) tall, with a weight of 45.625 kilograms (100.59 lb). Sora also sports a unique hair accessory, which is inspired by the famous "Dome of Light" at Formosa Boulevard Station, a station ranked one of the most beautiful in the world by Metrobits.org. Sora has a native Kaohsiung Mandarin accent, with the KMRT wanting her voice to sound "approachable" and "down to earth".
- Emelia, also spelled Amelia(艾米莉亞), a blonde half-Taiwanese, half-German girl who works as a train driver for the KMRT. She was revealed in December 2014 and was received positively by Taiwanese netizens. Rocket News 24 pointed out similarities between Amelia's character design and that of Atago from Kantai Collection. A life-size cut-out of the character was shown on display at Kaisyuan Station on the KMRT Red Line.
- Ann, also spelled Jie'er (婕兒), a "young-looking but fully grown" girl who works as a train maintenance engineer and mechanic.
- Nana, also spelled Nainai (耐耐), a Vocaloid-powered girl who works as a train announcer and customer service employee.

== Conception and creation ==
The first of the K.R.T. Girls, Sora, debuted in early November 2014 at two-day event for independent comic and video game creators hosted in Kaohsiung. They were created through a joint effort between the transport company and a team of animated artists to promote the subway and increase revenue. Following popular and positive reception from commuters, the other characters were later revealed independently at different dates. They were created to be "iconic representations of animated comics", and, according to then chairperson of the Kaohsiung Rapid Transit Corporation, Hao Chien-sheng (郝建生), this was as the company sought only to "transport passengers to their destinations, but also aspires to be mobile platforms of cultural creativity."

The characters are drawn with a "moe" art style, which is becoming increasingly popular across Taiwan and Japan. The K.R.T. Girls have been positively reviewed by Japanese netizens as well. Even before the mascots debuted in 2014, the Taiwan Railways Administration had already been incorporating "moe" mascots into its promotional efforts, through five girl characters dubbed the "Miss Taiwan Railway". This is reflective of the phenomenon to use anime-styled characters to promote products in East Asia, such as Hikaru Aizawa for Microsoft Silverlight; Simon, the company which conceptualized the K.R.T. Girls, had worked on such "moe" characters before in the past, such as Xuanying (絢櫻) of Pingtung County, and Air (also spelled Ai'er)(艾兒), who was created for an advocacy campaign by the Vehicle Engineering Faculty of the National Pingtung University of Science and Technology.

The promotional campaign, titled "Let's Go! K.R.T. Girls!" (前進吧！高捷少女！), has been commercially very successful. According to Focus Taiwan, the girls have brought in additional revenue of NT$2 million (US$61,576) in just the first seven months of 2015, and have also drawn the interest of a local video game firm and Japanese publishers. The KMRT has also stated that revenue from official K.R.T. Girls merchandise could reach NT$4 million by the end of 2015.

== Promotion and popularity ==
The girls have featured in various promotional efforts and official merchandise of the Kaohsiung Mass Rapid Transit. This includes PSA posters for subway etiquette, lifesize cardboard cutouts, as well as being temporarily plastered over trains on the Orange Line, which has been likened to "itasha carriages" by the Taipei Times. These special carriages feature three distinct art themes to allow travelers to "interact" with the girls, and have attracted several fans and cosplayers, including ones from Japan. The timetables for the carriages are posted on the company's website and updated daily. A song featuring Sora, titled Next Station. With You (下一站．與你) has also been released. Containing a "vibrant" and "happy" vibe, the song talks about traveling together with a loved one on board the Kaohsiung's MRT, with the Formosa Boulevard, Sizihwan, Weiwuying, and Cingpu stations being featured.

Various products featuring the K.R.T. Girls have been released. These include objects such as shopping bags, backpacks, fans, postcards, bookmarks and badges with images of the four fictional women, which have been sold in collaboration between the metro operator and the National Pingtung University of Science and Technology. A serial light novel featuring the K.R.T. Girls has been published online by GA Bunko in Japanese since September 2015, with printing beginning at the end of the year. There is also an official Facebook page for the girls.

As reported by the Taipei Times, an online video featuring Sora had amassed more than 10,000 Facebook likes in one day, as well as generating a long discussion thread. The Kaohsiung Rapid Transit Corporation said that it considers online discourse and responses about the characters to be positive, as different opinions and perspectives allow them to better understand their fanbase. A visual novel featuring the K.R.T. Girls, titled Let's Go! K.R.T. Girls Initiating Station (前進吧！高捷少女 Initiating Station) was released on January 30 in Taiwan.

A song album, titled K.R.T. Girls Character Image Songs Station.1 (高捷少女角色形象歌曲 Station.1) has also been released. A sequel, Station.2, was released on January 27, 2018.
