= Kaohsiung Museum of Labor =

Museum in Qianjin, Kaohsiung, Taiwan

- 高雄市勞工博物館
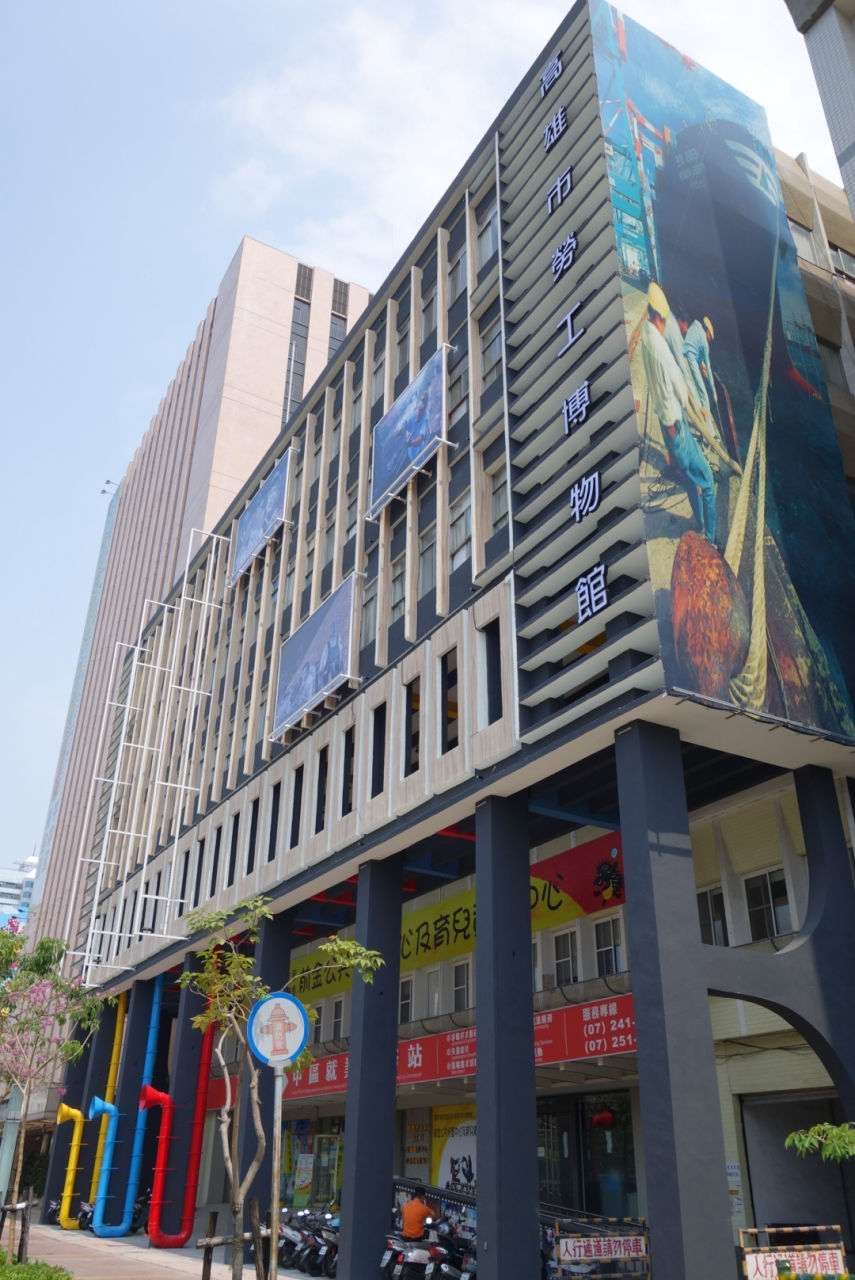
- Established: 1 May 2010 (original building); 25 July 2015 (current building)
- Location: Cianjin, Kaohsiung, Taiwan
- Coordinates: 22°37′13″N 120°16′54″E
- Type: museum
- Owner: Labor Affairs Bureau of Kaohsiung City Government
- Public transit access: City Council Station
- Website: Official website

The Kaohsiung Museum of Labor (traditional Chinese: 高雄市勞工博物館; simplified Chinese: 高雄市劳工博物馆; pinyin: Gāoxióngshì Láogōng Bówùguǎn) is a museum about labor in Cianjin District, Kaohsiung, Taiwan.

== History ==
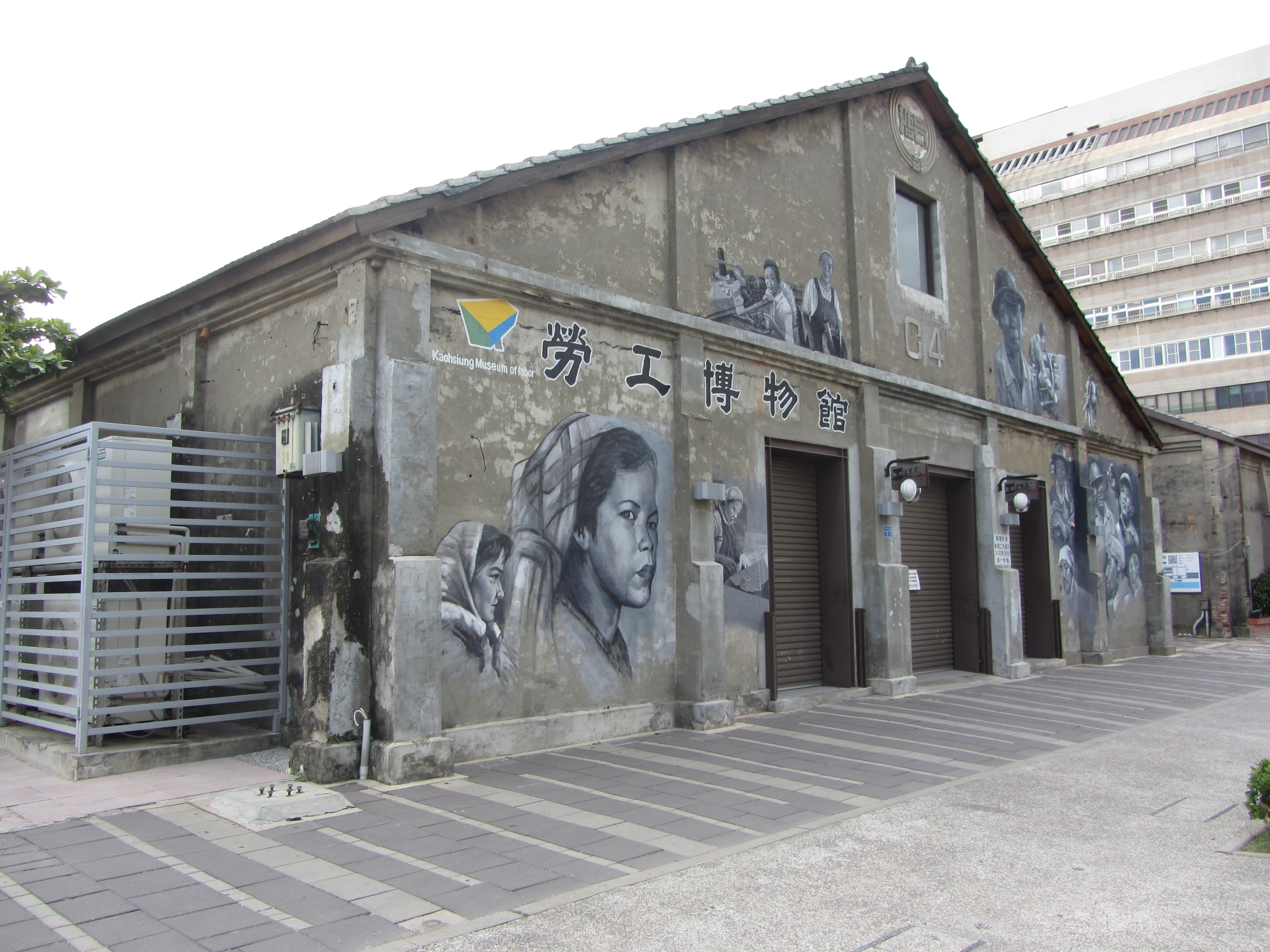
Former Kaohsiung Museum of Labor in Pier-2 Art Center

The museum was originally officially opened in conjunction with the International Workers' Day on 1 May 2010 in Pier-2 Art Center. However, the soft opening was earlier, on 26 December 2009. In 2015, the museum was relocated from Yancheng to Cianjin District and was reopened on 25 July the same year. During the opening ceremony, various events and displays were held, such as retro marketplace and storytelling.

== Exhibitions ==
The museum features the evolution of the labor force in the city, Taiwan's labor movement and the recent animation, comics and video games sectors.

== Transportation ==
The museum is accessible within walking distance west from Cianjin Station of the Kaohsiung MRT.

== See also ==
- List of museums in Taiwan
