= KCMH =

KCMH may refer to:

- the ICAO airport code for John Glenn Columbus International Airport, outside Columbus, Ohio, United States
- Kaohsiung City Music Hall in Kaohsiung, Taiwan
- KCMH (FM), a radio station (91.5 FM) licensed to Mountain Home, Arkansas, United States
- King Chulalongkorn Memorial Hospital in Bangkok, Thailand
