= International Convention Center Kaohsiung =

Convention center in Yancheng, Kaohsiung, Taiwan

International Convention Center Kaohsiung 高雄國際會議中心
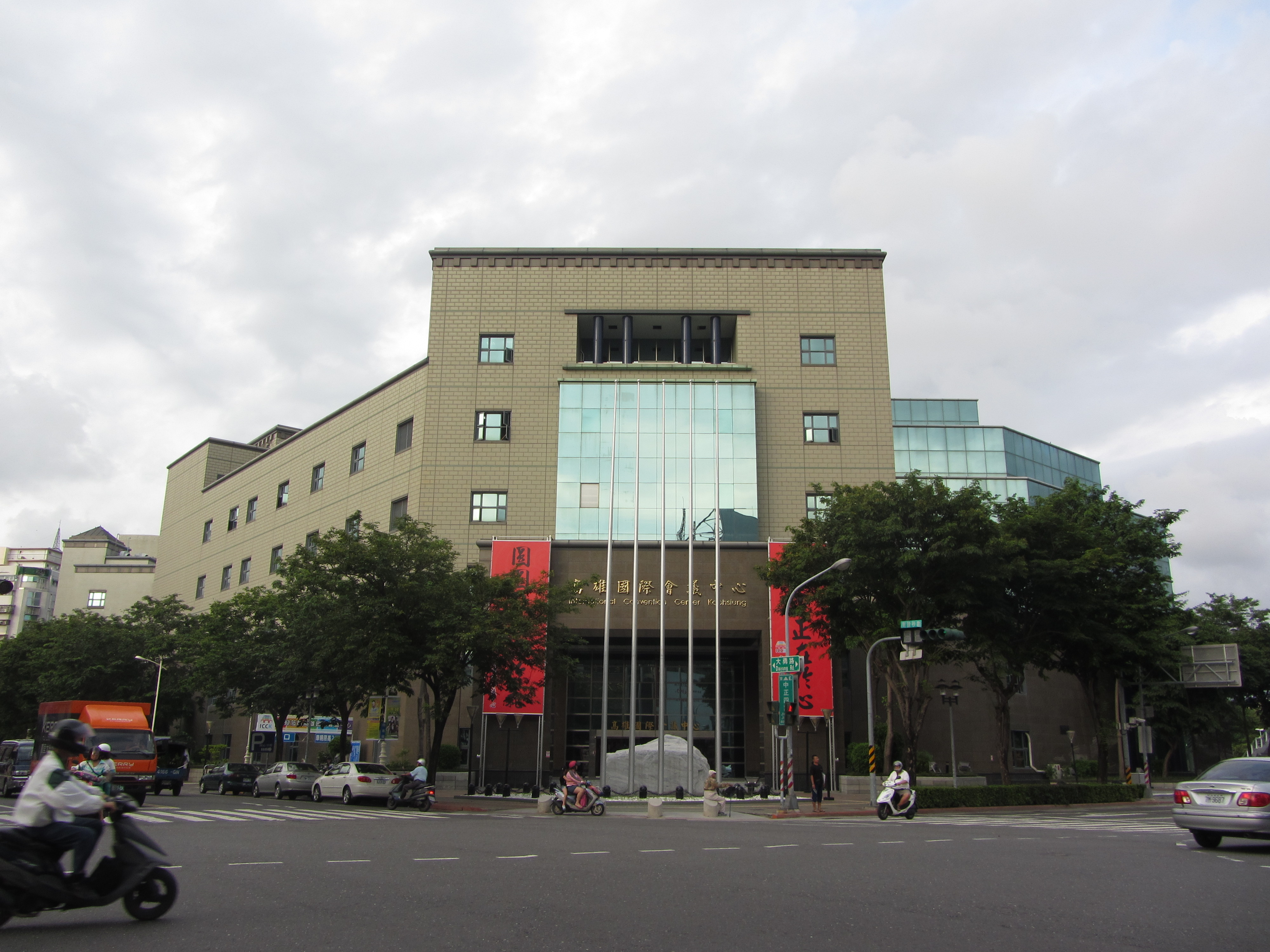
- Interactive map of International Convention Center Kaohsiung 高雄國際會議中心
- Former names: Kaohsiung Business Exhibition Center
- Location: Yancheng, Kaohsiung, Taiwan
- Coordinates: 22°37′35.1″N 120°17′08.6″E
- Public transit: Yanchengpu Station

Construction
- Opened: 2000 (Kaohsiung Business Exhibition Center); 2013

The International Convention Center Kaohsiung (ICCK; traditional Chinese: 高雄國際會議中心; simplified Chinese: 高雄国际会议中心; pinyin: Gāoxióng Guójì Huìyì Zhōngxīn) is a convention center in Yancheng District, Kaohsiung, Taiwan.

== History ==
In early 1991, Kaohsiung City Government started a plan to build a convention center in Yancheng District. In 2000, the construction of Kaohsiung Business Exhibition Center was completed. The center was run by a private sector from then until 13 March 2007. In May 2010, the city government took over the operation of the center. In January 2012, the Grand Conference Management Company was commissioned to operate and manage the center.

In July 2012, the city government transformed the Kaohsiung Business Exhibition Center into the International Convention Center Kaohsiung. Major renovations were made including expanding the 6 conference rooms to 26. A total up to 200 tables for banquet style dining can now be accommodated on its first floor, as well as parking spaces for 500 cars. The convention center was finally completed and trial operation started on 4 November 2012. It was then officially opened in 2013.

== Architecture ==
The building is a six-story structure with a total floor area of 163,180 m^{2}. Each floor has a maximum exhibition area of 2,800 m^{2}. The center can accommodate meetings for up to 1,500 people and exhibitions of up to 380 booths.

== Transportation ==
The center is accessible within walking distance North East from Yanchengpu Station of Kaohsiung MRT.

== See also ==
- Kaohsiung Exhibition Center
- Taipei International Convention Center
- ICC Tainan
- List of convention centers in Taiwan
- List of tourist attractions in Taiwan
