= Dayi Pier-2 light rail station =

Light rail station in Kaohsiung, Taiwan

Coordinates: 22.6185°N 120.2842°E

Dayi Pier-2 C12 駁二大義站
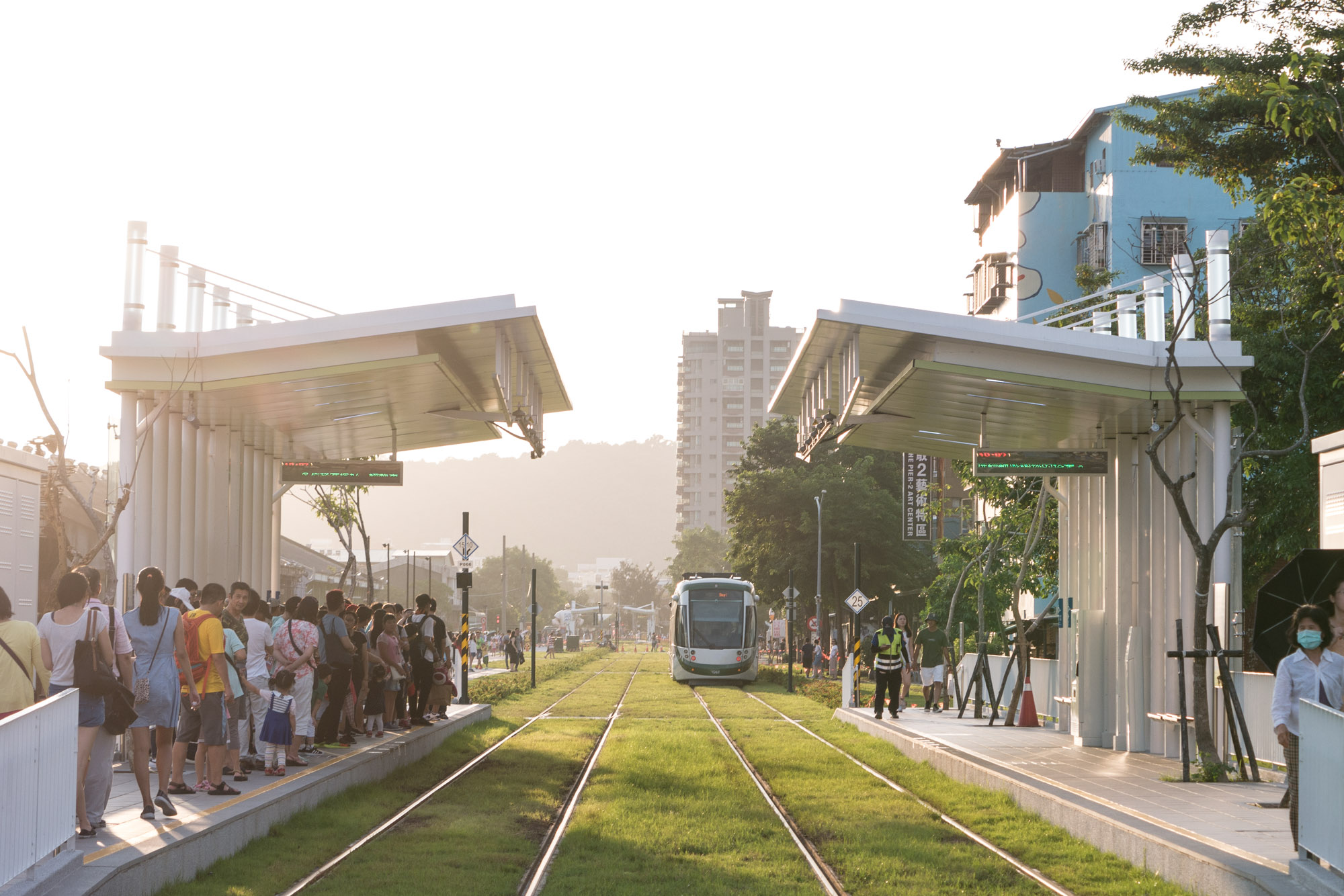

General information
- Location: Yancheng, Kaohsiung; Taiwan
- Operated by: Kaohsiung Rapid Transit Corporation
- Line: Circular line
- Platforms: 2 side platforms
- Connections: Bus stop

Construction
- Structure type: At-grade
- Accessible: Yes

Other information
- Station code: C12

History
- Opened: October 16, 2015

Services
Preceding station	Kaohsiung Metro	Following station
Love Pier outer loop / anticlockwise	Circular light rail	Penglai Pier-2 inner loop / clockwise
Location

Dayi Pier-2 (Chinese: 駁二大義站; pinyin: Bóèr Dàyì) is a light rail station of the Circular Line of the Kaohsiung rapid transit system. It is located in Yancheng District, Kaohsiung, Taiwan.

== Station overview ==
This is a street-level station with two side platforms. It is located inside Pier-2 Art Center.

== Station layout ==
Street level	Side platform
Street level	← Circular light rail toward Heart of Love River (Penglai Pier-2)
Street level	→ Circular light rail toward Kaisyuan Park (Love Pier)
Street level	Side platform

== Around the station ==
- Pier-2 Art Center
- Great Harbor Bridge
- Dayi Warehouse (大義倉庫)
- Holo Park
- Kaohsiung Harbor Piers 5-10
