= Lee Chiao-ju =

Taiwanese politician

- 李喬如

Member of the Kaohsiung City Council
- Incumbent
- Assumed office 25 December 2010
- Constituency: Gushan, Yancheng, and Cijin districts

Personal details
- Born: June 24, 1957 (age 68) Pingtung County, Taiwan
- Party: Democratic Progressive Party
- Education: National Sun Yat-sen University (BA, MA)

Chinese name
- Traditional Chinese: 李喬如
- Simplified Chinese: 李乔如
Transcriptions
Standard Mandarin
- Hanyu Pinyin: Lǐ Qiáorú
- Bopomofo: ㄌㄧˇ ㄑㄧㄠˊ ㄖㄨˊ
- Gwoyeu Romatzyh: Lii Chuau'ru
- Wade–Giles: Li^{3} Ch'iao^{2}-Ju^{2}
- Tongyong Pinyin: Lǐ Ciáorú
- Yale Romanization: Li^{3} Chyau^{2}-ru^{2}
Yue: Cantonese
- Jyutping: Lei^{5} Kiu^{4}-jyu^{4}

Lee Chiao-ju (Chinese: 李喬如; born 24 June 1957) is a Taiwanese politician. She is a member of the Kaohsiung City Council for the constituencies of Gushan District, Yancheng District, and Cijin District.

== Political policies ==
In a 2012 district council meeting, Lee proposed that public servants should be assessed by their marital status and whether they have children. She suggested banning single men or women older than 30 years old from running for office, allegedly as a means to address Taiwan's low birth rate. Lee's suggestion was immediately dismissed by Mayor Chen Chu in the meeting, with Chen pointing out that the government must respect human rights.

The incident triggered heated debates in internet chatrooms as to the merits of having children, whilst some individuals called for Lee's dismissal from the DPP. However, Lee defended her proposal, saying that, "Those with such selfish ideas as not wanting to get married and not wanting to have children should shoulder some social responsibility."

Lee has supported regional measures to limit the number of Mainland Chinese tourists to the Sizihwan Scenic Area after complaints by citizens.

== Bribery charges ==
In 2003, accusations were made that 34 members of the City Council had accepted NT$5 million each from the speaker Chu An-hsiung (朱安雄), founder of An Feng Steel, to vote for him in the 2002 election. 24 councillors were convicted, but Lee was found not guilty by a district court. In early 2004, the court rejected the prosecution's appeal against Lee's sentence, whilst seven other councillors were forced to leave their jobs.

In a 2008 court case, the Kaohsiung District Prosecutor's Office alleged that members of the council had taken bribes. This prompted an investigation, which resulted in the prosecution charging Lee and 22 other city council members with corruption in April 2011. The charges focussed on the "assistance fees" that council members had billed people for between 2002-2008 and then not declared. In 2015, the Kaohsiung branch of Taiwan's High Court ruled that the council members had technically accepted bribes and, meanwhile, had attempted to pervert the course of justice. All members received different sentences, with Lee given 1 year and 10 months; the sentence could be exchanged for a fine.
