= Cianjin metro station =

Metro station in Qianjin, Kaohsiung, Taiwan

Cianjin O4 前金
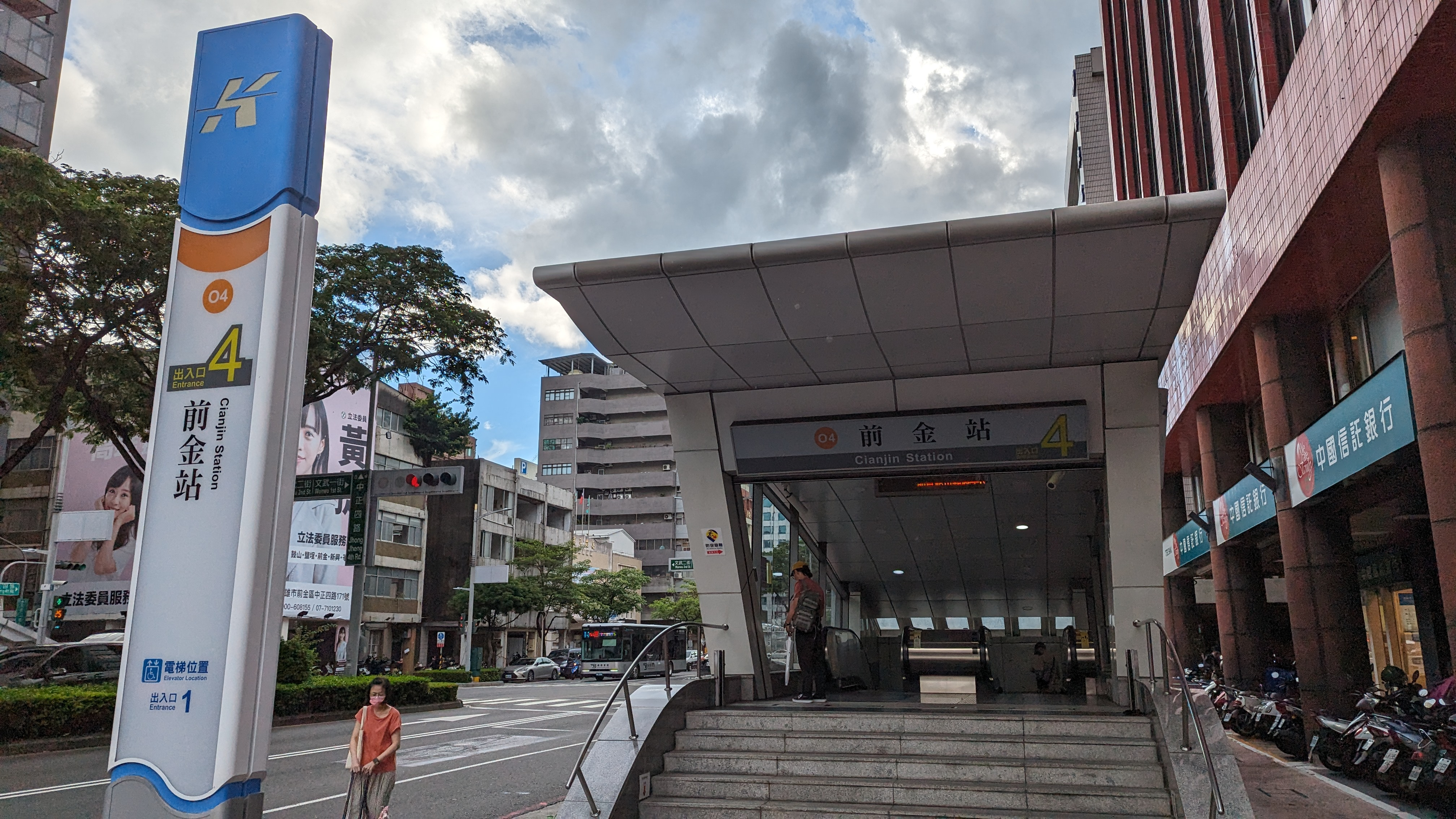
- Cianjin station exit 4

General information
- Location: Cianjin, Kaohsiung; Taiwan
- Coordinates: 22°37′44″N 120°17′40″E
- Operated by: Kaohsiung Rapid Transit Corporation
- Line: Orange line (O4)
- Platforms: 1 island platform
- Connections: Bus stop

Construction
- Structure type: Underground
- Accessible: Yes

History
- Opened: 2008-09-14

Passengers
- 4,566 daily (Jan. 2011)

Services
Preceding station	Kaohsiung Metro	Following station
Yanchengpu towards Hamasen	Orange line	Formosa Boulevard towards Daliao
Location

Cianjin metro station
- Traditional Chinese: 前金車站
- Simplified Chinese: 前金车站
Transcriptions
Standard Mandarin
- Hanyu Pinyin: Qiánjīn Chēzhàn
- Bopomofo: ㄑㄧㄢˊ ㄐㄧㄣ ㄔㄜ ㄓㄢˋ
- Wade–Giles: Ch'ien^{2}-chin^{1} Ch'ê^{1}-chan^{4}
- Tongyong Pinyin: Ciánjin Chējhàn

Cianjin is a station on the Orange line of Kaohsiung Metro in Cianjin District, Kaohsiung, Taiwan.

== Station overview ==
This is a two-level, underground station with an island platform and four exits. It is 206 metres long and is located at the intersection of Jhongjheng 4th Rd and Jhonghua 3rd Rd.

During the opening of the station, it was named City Council station. However, after the merging of Kaohsiung City and Kaohsiung County in 2010, the Kaohsiung City Council was relocated to the original Kaohsiung County Council, located near Fongshan West metro station, so it was marked with "former site" at the end of the station name to avoid confusion. However, the name of the station remains unchanged.

It was renamed Cianjin station in 2024.

=== Station layout ===
Street level	Entrance/exit	Entrance/exit
B1	Concourse	Lobby, information desk, automatic ticket machines, one-way faregates, restrooms (near exits 1)
B2	Platform 1	← KMRT Orange line toward Hamasen (Yanchengpu)
B2	Island platform, doors will open on the left
B2	Platform 2	KMRT Orange line toward Daliao (Formosa Boulevard) →

=== Exits ===
- Exit 1: Kaohsiung City Government Department of Education, Southern Taiwan Joint Services Center of the Executive Yuan
- Exit 2: Cianjin District Administrative Center, Cianjin Elementary School
- Exit 3: Datong Elementary School
- Exit 4: Jianguo Elementary School, Liuhe Night Market

== Around the station ==
- Cianjin Market
- Cianjin Junior High School
- Kaohsiung City Government Police Bureau
- Kaohsiung City Government Fire Bureau
- Kaohsiung Li De Baseball Stadium
- Kaohsiung Museum of Labor
- Kaohsiung Ta-tung Hospital
