= Kaohsiung Museum of History =

Museum in Yancheng, Kaohsiung, Taiwan

- 高雄市立歷史博物館
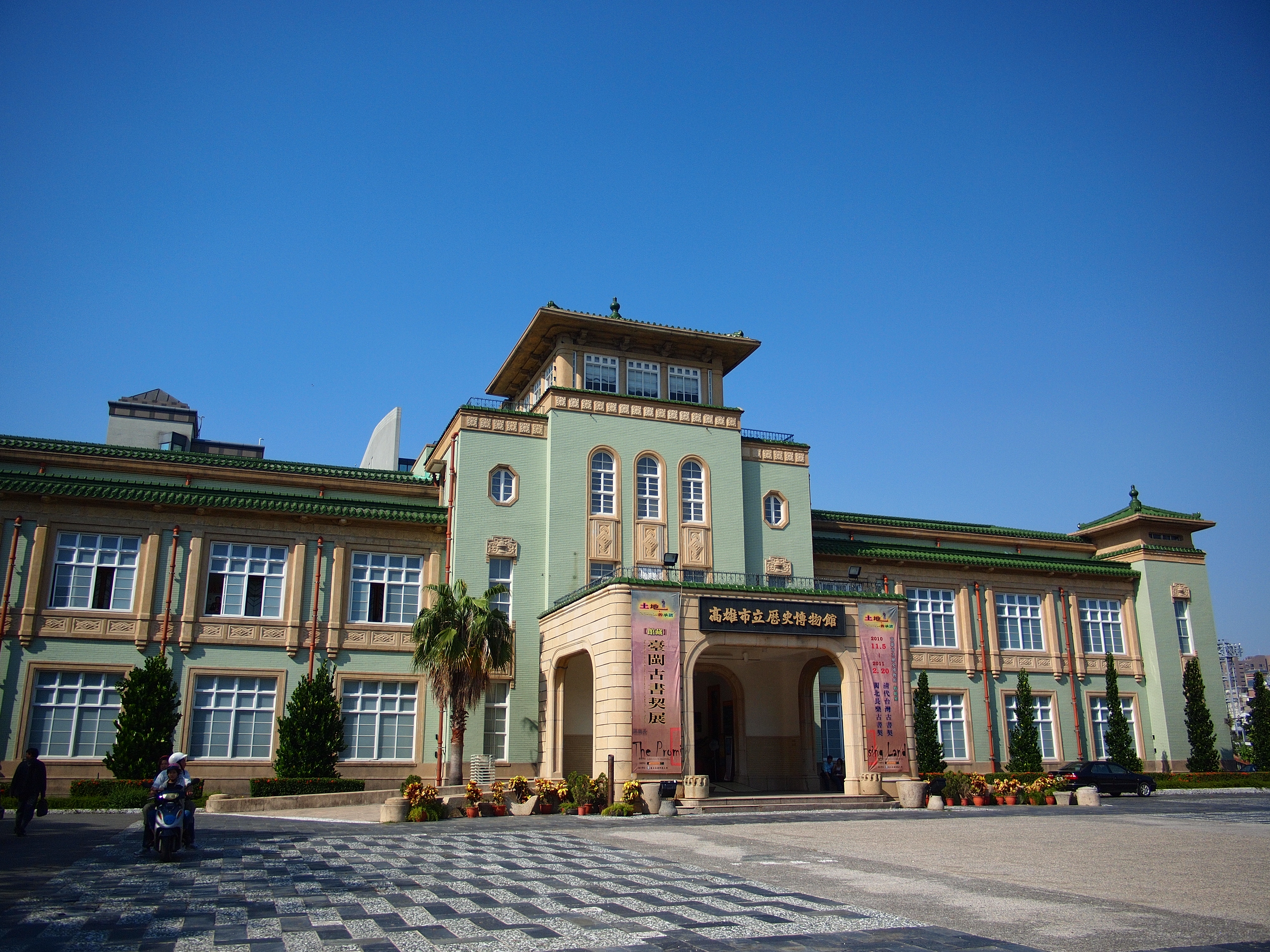
- Former name: Kaohsiung City Hall
- Established: 16 September 1939 (as Kaohsiung City Hall); 25 October 1998 (as Kaohsiung Museum of History)
- Location: Yancheng, Kaohsiung, Taiwan
- Coordinates: 22°37′36.3″N 120°17′12.8″E
- Type: Museum
- Architect: Oono Yonezirou
- Website: khm.org.tw

The Kaohsiung Museum of History (traditional Chinese: 高雄市立歷史博物館; simplified Chinese: 高雄市立历史博物馆; pinyin: Gāoxióng Shìlì Lìshǐ Bówùguǎn) is a museum located in Yancheng District, Kaohsiung, Taiwan. It is administered by the Kaohsiung City Government.

== History ==
The building of the museum was originally the Kaohsiung City Hall. It was designed by Japanese architect Oono Yonezirou, working with the Shimizu Corporation under the Japanese government, and completed in 1939. After 1945, the city hall was renamed to Kaohsiung Municipal Government. On 18 January 1992, the municipal government moved to Union Office Building and the old building was turned into the Kaohsiung Museum of History which was opened on 25 October 1998.

== Architecture ==
The building's architecture is an example of the Japanese Imperial Crown style. It was built with reinforced concrete for seismic resistance, as Taiwan is prone to earthquakes.

The exterior of the building used the military base color of light green. It overall adopted the main tower with bilaterally symmetrical sub-towers style. The main tower is located on the top of the fourth floor. Both of the main tower and sub-towers at both sides were added with traditional Japanese four sharp corner top and glazed tile roof. They were decorated with Aquarius style spire, plum flowers patterns of raindrops and Japanese chrysanthemum pattern of ribbons. The walls of the building were sculpted with all kinds of decorations and the windows were made with exquisite and ingenuity handicraft.

The interior of the building features the Y-shaped staircases in the luxurious lobby, the aesthetic arched corridors on the sides, the bright high-ceilinged patio and the eastern and western patterns of the grand columns. These decorations symbolize the prestigious ruling power of Japan and the harmonious architectural mixture of the east and the west.

== Collection ==
Kaohsiung Museum of History (KMH) is expected to be the historical repository of Kaohsiung area by establishing the collection based on “Kaohsiung City development”. To preserve the local background knowledge and emphasize the characteristics of the area meanwhile share it with the public, KMH systematically analyzes, collects and maintains the history track and multiculturalism of Kaohsiung, shows the essential meaning of people living in Kaohsiung and represents the cultural relics and historical data of contemporary social events or issues as the basis of research, exhibitions and education promotion.

== Transportation ==
The museum is accessible within walking distance North East from Yanchengpu Station of the Kaohsiung MRT or by city bus or by taking city bike.

== See also ==
- List of museums in Taiwan
