= Fuxing Suspension Bridge =

Suspension bridge in Taichung, Taiwan

Fuxing Suspension Bridge 福興吊橋
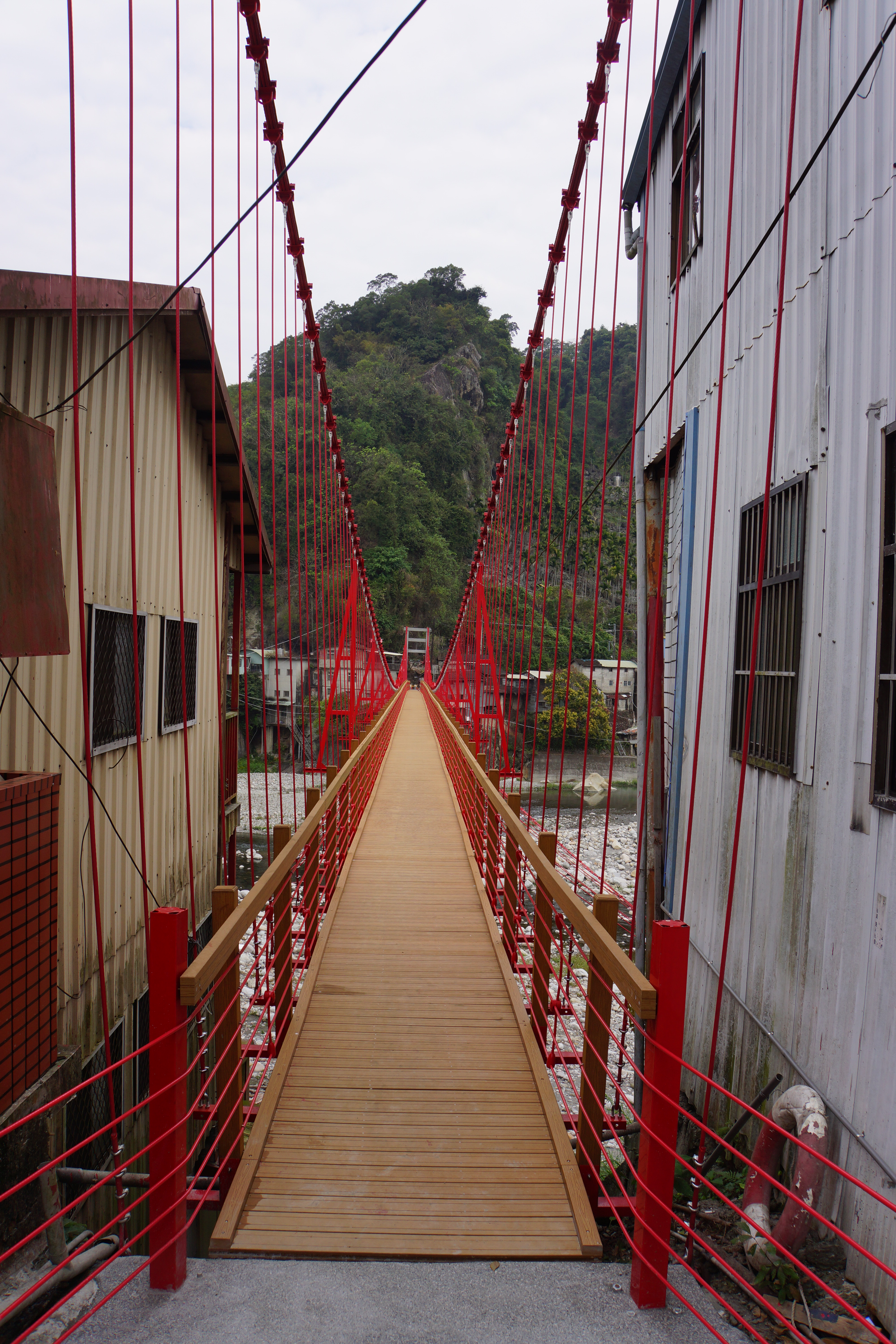
- Coordinates: 24°09′38.5″N 120°51′40.2″E
- Crosses: Dajia River
- Locale: Taichung, Taiwan

Characteristics
- Design: suspension bridge
- Total length: 150 meters

History
- Opened: 2013

Location
- Interactive map of Fuxing Suspension Bridge

The Fuxing Suspension Bridge (traditional Chinese: 福興吊橋; simplified Chinese: 福兴吊桥; pinyin: Fúxìng Diàoqiáo) is a suspension bridge connecting Dongshi District and Xinshe District in Taichung, Taiwan.

== History ==
The bridge was opened in 2013.

== Technical specifications ==
The bridge spans over a length of 150 meters over Dajia River.

== See also ==
- List of bridges in Taiwan
