= Hamasen Museum of Taiwan Railway =

Museum in Yancheng, Kaohsiung, Taiwan

- 哈瑪星台灣鐵道館
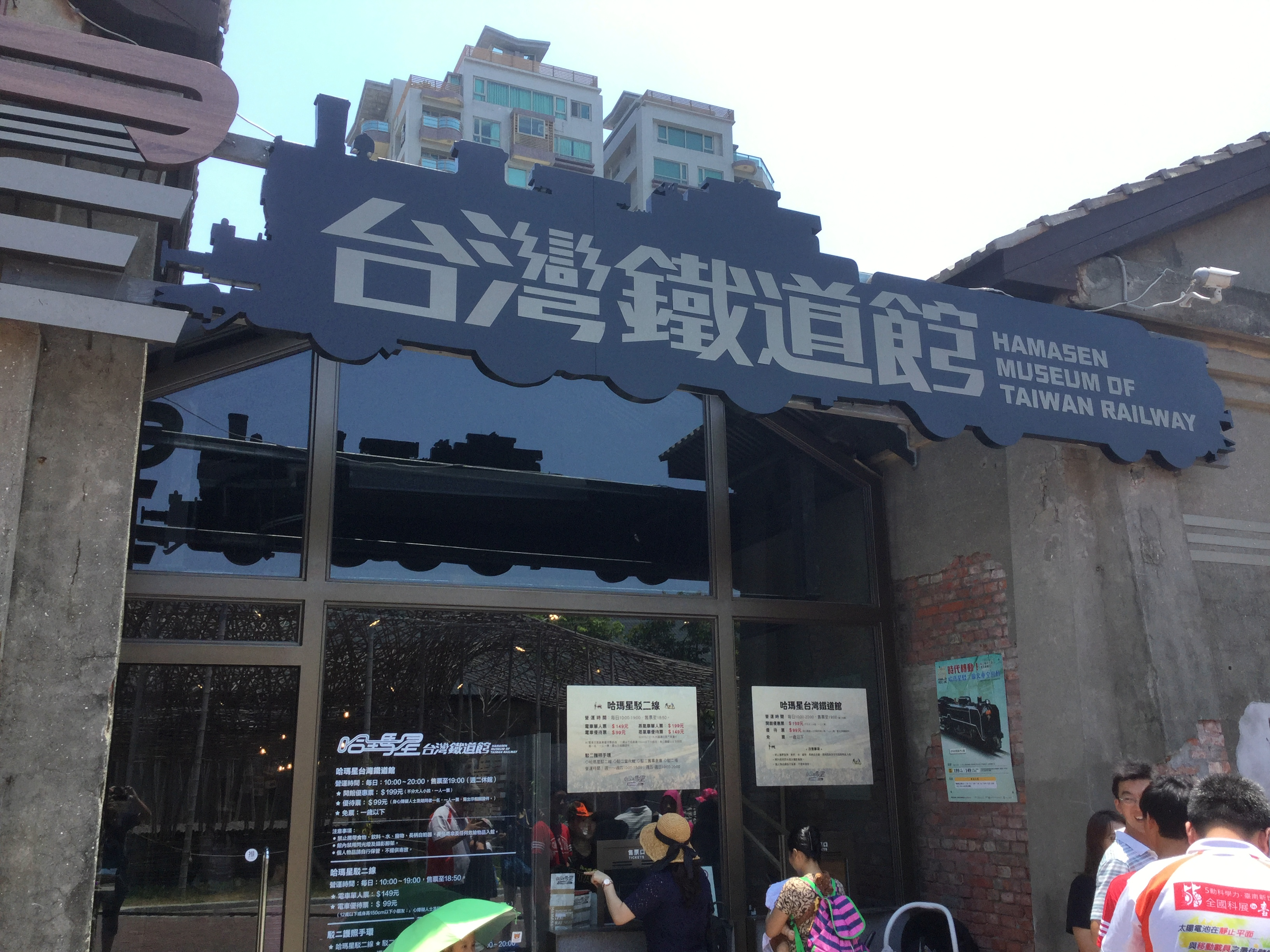
- Established: 3 July 2016
- Location: Yancheng, Kaohsiung, Taiwan
- Coordinates: 22°37′14.7″N 120°16′42.2″E
- Type: railway museum
- Website: Official website

The Hamasen Museum of Taiwan Railway (traditional Chinese: 哈瑪星台灣鐵道館; simplified Chinese: 哈玛星台湾铁道馆; pinyin: Hāmǎxīng Táiwān Tiědào Guǎn) is a railway museum in Pier-2 Art Center, Yancheng District, Kaohsiung, Taiwan.

== History ==
The museum building was originally constructed as a railway station. In 2003, the museum building was declared a historical building by the Kaohsiung City Government. On 9 November 2008, the last train departed from the station and soon later the station was closed down and the city government took over the ownership of the building. On 24 October 2010, the government granted the permit to Railway Culture Society to transform the building into a museum. The museum was opened on 3 July 2016.

== Architecture ==
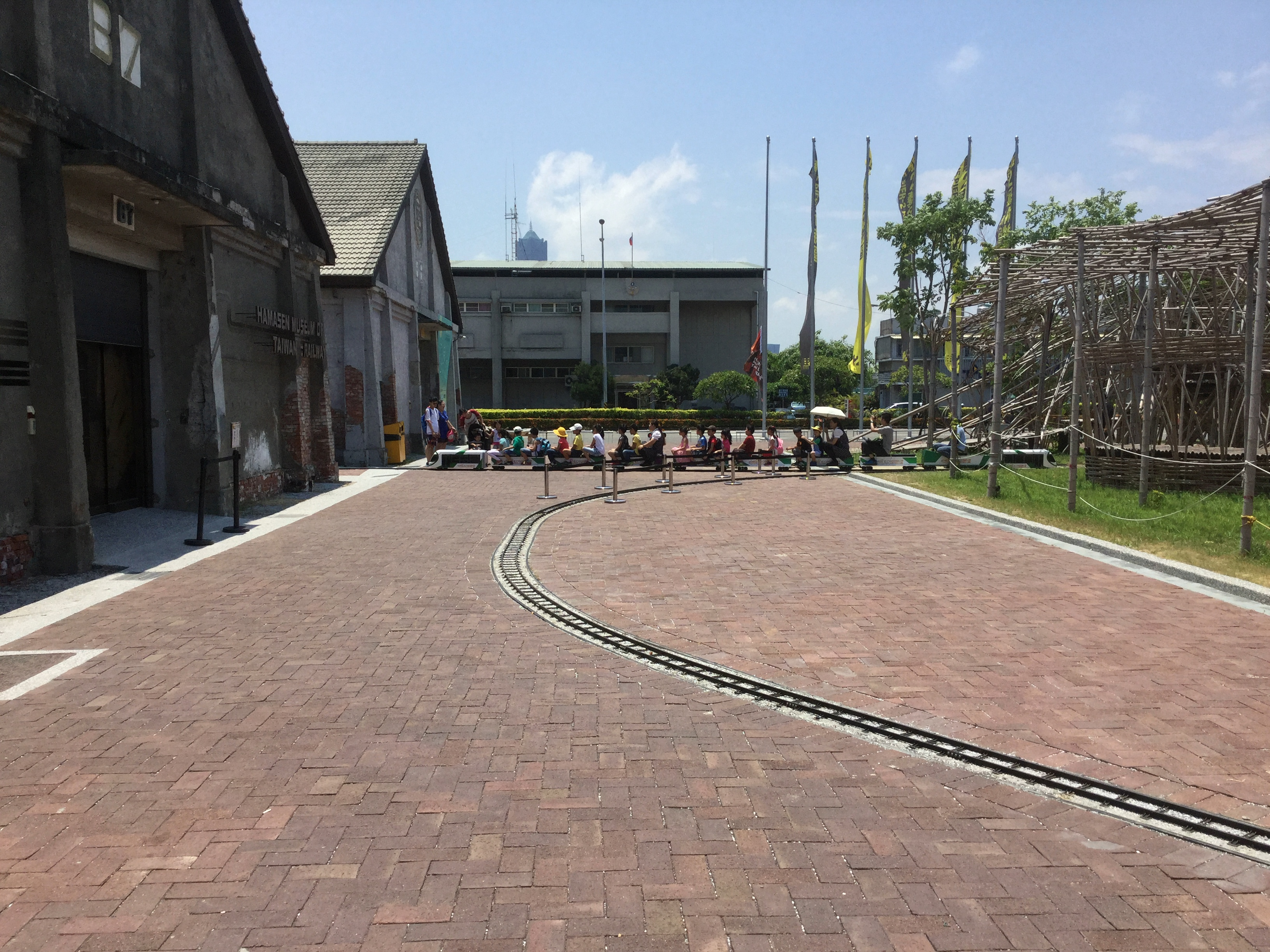
Hamasen Pier-2 Line

The museum consists of the interactive exhibition, classic scene and Hamasen Pier-2 Line. It is located inside Warehouse B7 and B8.

== Transportation ==
The museum is accessible within walking distance east from Hamasen Station of Kaohsiung MRT.

== See also ==
- List of museums in Taiwan
