= Yanchengpu metro station =

Metro station in Kaohsiung, Taiwan

Yanchengpu O2 鹽埕埔
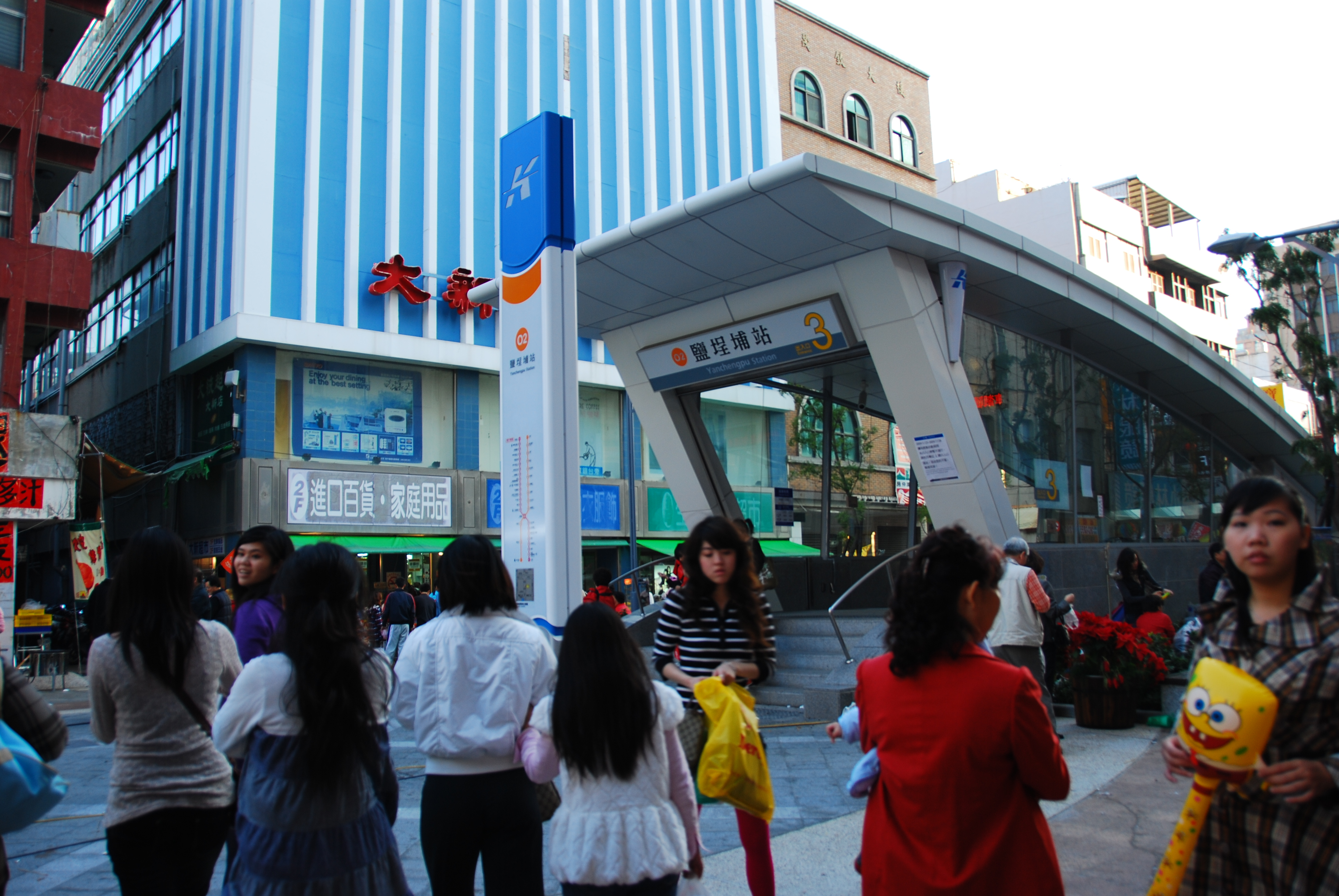
- Yanchengpu station exit 3

General information
- Location: Yancheng, Kaohsiung; Taiwan
- Coordinates: 22°37′27″N 120°17′03″E
- Operated by: Kaohsiung Rapid Transit Corporation
- Line: Orange line (O2)
- Platforms: 1 island platform
- Connections: Bus stop

Construction
- Structure type: Underground
- Accessible: Yes

History
- Opened: 2008-09-14

Passengers
- 6,023 daily (Jan. 2011)

Services
Preceding station	Kaohsiung Metro	Following station
Hamasen Terminus	Orange line	Cianjin towards Daliao
Location

Yanchengpu metro station
- Traditional Chinese: 鹽埕埔站
Transcriptions
Standard Mandarin
- Hanyu Pinyin: Yánchéngpǔ zhàn
- Bopomofo: ㄧㄢˊ ㄔㄥˊ ㄆㄨˇ ㄓㄢˋ
- Wade–Giles: Yen^{2}-ch'êng^{2}-p'u^{3} chan^{4}
- Tongyong Pinyin: Yánchéngpǔ jhàn
Southern Min
- Hokkien POJ: Iâm-tiâⁿ-po͘ chām
- Tâi-lô: Iâm-tiânn-poo tsām

Yanchengpu is a station on the Orange line of Kaohsiung Metro in Yancheng District, Kaohsiung, Taiwan.

== Station overview ==
This is a two-level, underground station with an island platform and four exits. The station is 288 metres (945 ft) long and is at the intersection of Dayong Road and Wufu 4th Road.

=== Station layout ===
Street level	Entrance/exit	Entrance/exit
B1	Concourse	Lobby, information desk, automatic ticket machines, one-way faregates, restrooms (near exit 1)
B2	Platform 1	← KMRT Orange line toward Hamasen (Terminus)
B2	Island platform, doors will open on the left
B2	Platform 2	KMRT Orange line toward Daliao (Cianjin) →

=== Exits ===
- Exit 1: Yancheng Elementary School, Shinkuchan Shopping District
- Exit 2: Kaohsiung Museum of History, Kaohsiung Business Exhibition Center
- Exit 3: Yancheng Junior High School
- Exit 4: Jhongsiao Elementary School

== Around the station ==
- International Convention Center Kaohsiung
- Kaohsiung City Music Hall
- Kaohsiung Film Archive
- Kaohsiung Museum of History
- Love Pier
- Love River
- Pier-2 Art Center
- Shinkuchan Shopping District
- Kaohsiung Business Exhibition Center
- Kaohsiung Bridge
