= Xinshe District =

District in Taichung, Taiwan

Coordinates: 24°15′51.5″N 120°48′1.2″E

Xinshe 新社區
- District
- Xinshe District
- Location in the city
- Country: Taiwan
- Special municipality: Taichung
- Established (District): 2010

Area
  - Total: 68.8874 km^{2} (26.5976 sq mi)

Population (February 2023)
  - Total: 23,256
  - Density: 337.59/km^{2} (874.37/sq mi)
- Time zone: UTC+8 (CST)
- Website: www.xinshe.taichung.gov.tw (in Chinese)

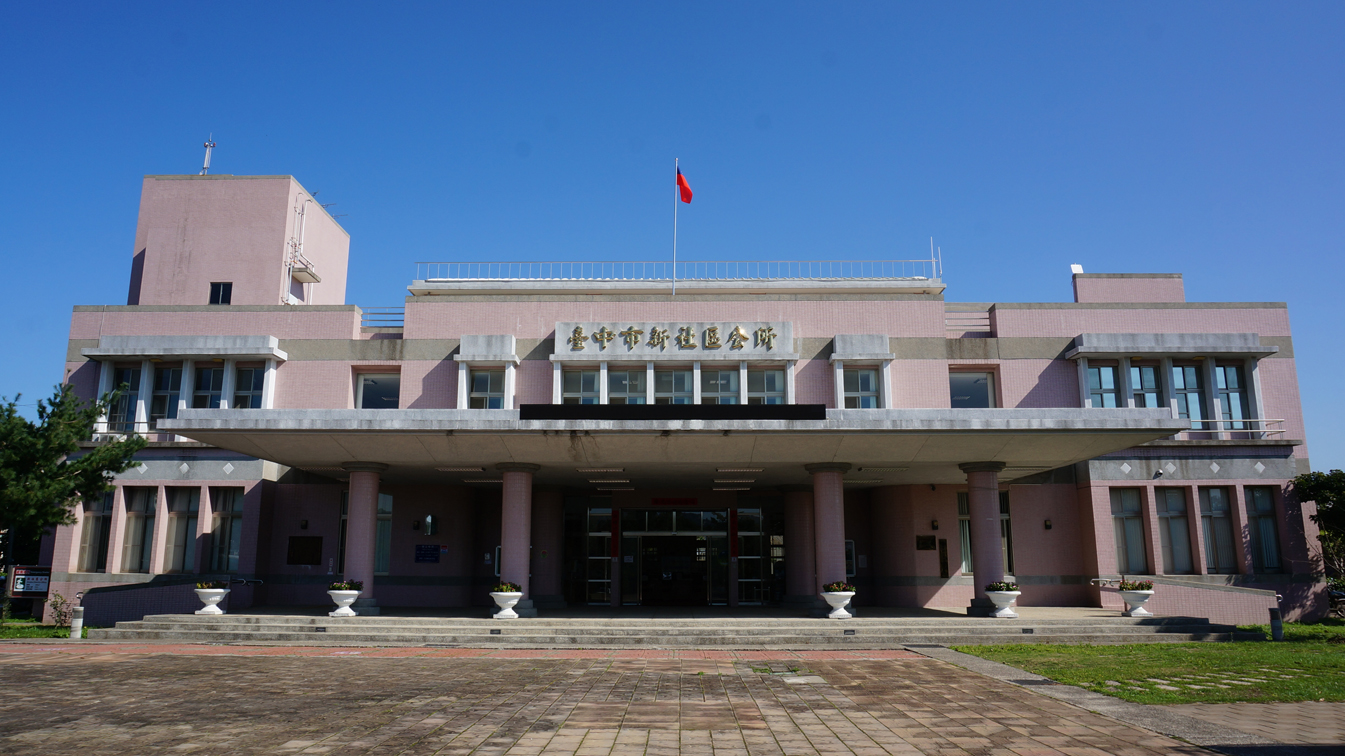
Xinshe District office

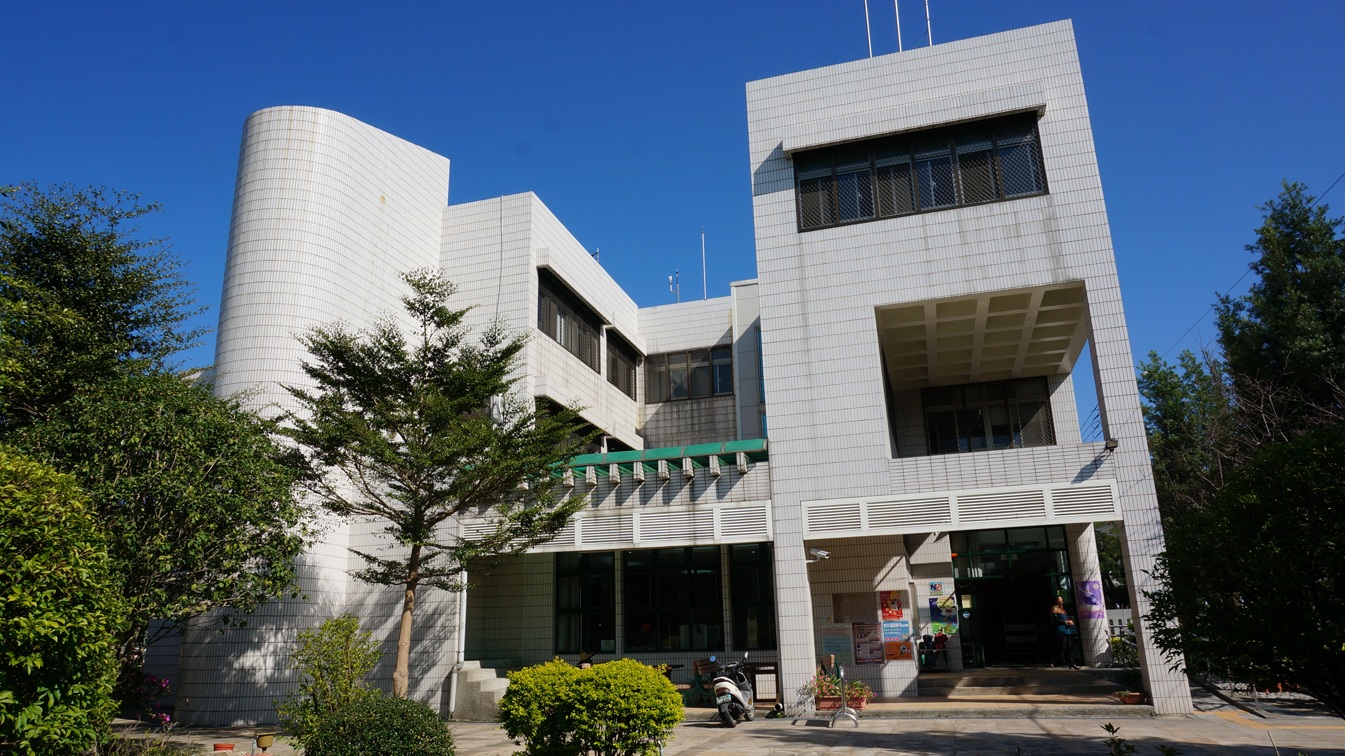
Xinshe District library

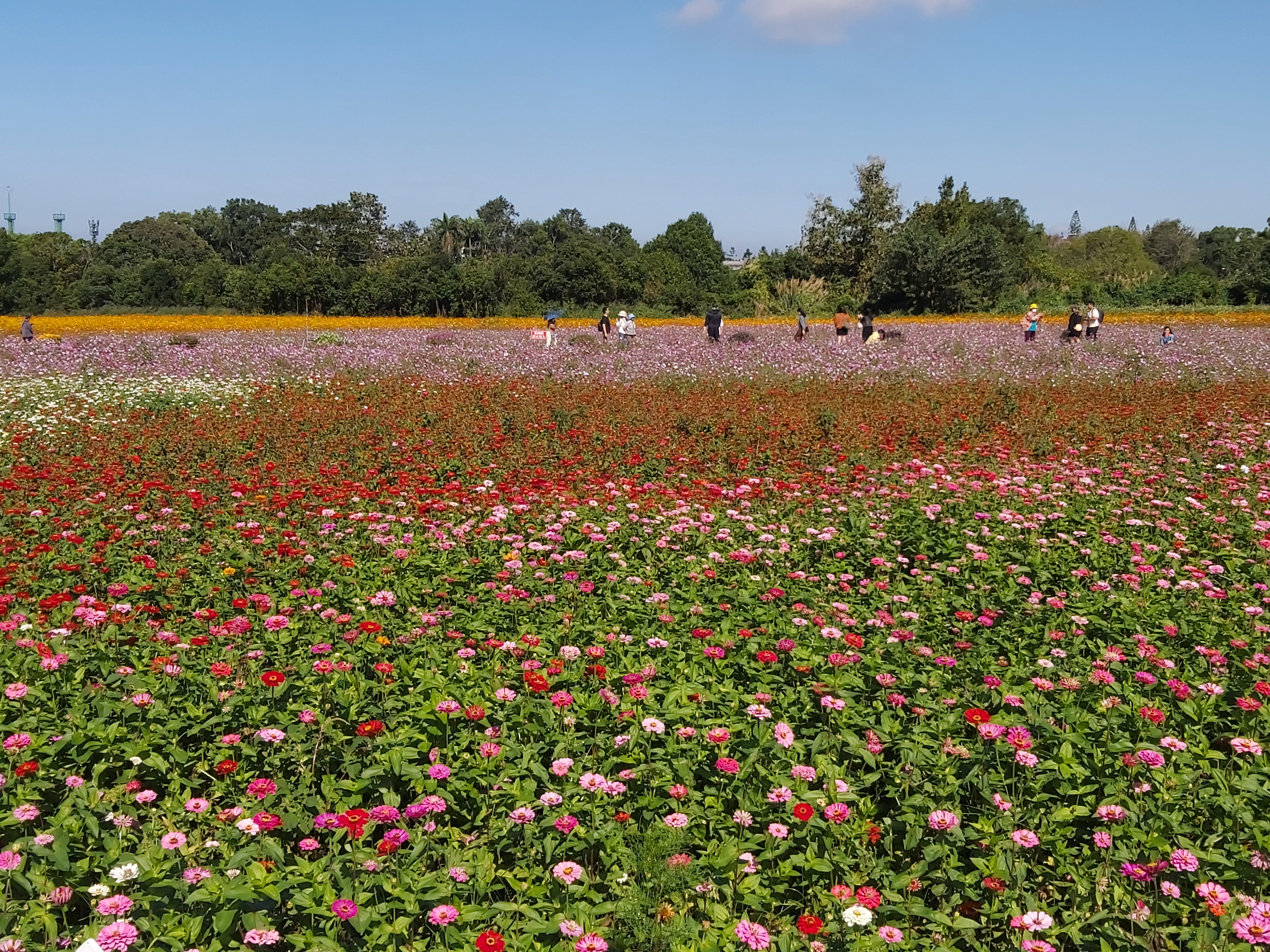
Taichung International Flower Carpet Festival in Xinshe District

Xinshe District (Chinese: 新社區; pinyin: Xīnshè Qū) is a rural district in Taichung, Taiwan. It is also called "Taichung's back garden". The city is home to many military bases. However, the district's hillside houses were destroyed by 1999 Chi-Chi earthquake.

== Administrative divisions ==
Danan, Yuehu, Zhongzheng, Zhonghe, Zhongxing, Yongyuan, Dongxing, Xiecheng, Kunshan, Xinshe, Fuxing, Fusheng and Qixi Village.

== Education ==
=== Senior High School ===
- Taichung Municipal Xinshe Senior High School

== Native products ==
Xinshe township fruits: Citrus, Grape, Carambola, Gaojie Pears, Loquats, Mushrooms, Sugar-apple, flowers, Bonsais

== Tourist attractions ==
- Fuxing Suspension Bridge

== Transport ==
- Provincial Highway No.21
- County Road 129 (Shigang － Xinshe － Beitun － Taiping, Taichung City)

== Climate ==
Climate data for Xinshe District, elevation 470 m (1,540 ft), (1991–2010 normals, extremes 1995–present)
Month	Jan	Feb	Mar	Apr	May	Jun	Jul	Aug	Sep	Oct	Nov	Dec	Year
Record high °C (°F)	27.7 (81.9)	31.1 (88.0)	31.2 (88.2)	33.7 (92.7)	34.3 (93.7)	33.5 (92.3)	36.0 (96.8)	33.8 (92.8)	34.3 (93.7)	32.4 (90.3)	31.0 (87.8)	29.3 (84.7)	36.0 (96.8)
Mean daily maximum °C (°F)	19.3 (66.7)	19.9 (67.8)	22.1 (71.8)	24.9 (76.8)	27.3 (81.1)	28.7 (83.7)	30.0 (86.0)	29.6 (85.3)	28.8 (83.8)	26.9 (80.4)	24.3 (75.7)	20.9 (69.6)	25.2 (77.4)
Daily mean °C (°F)	14.2 (57.6)	15.2 (59.4)	17.7 (63.9)	21.0 (69.8)	23.7 (74.7)	25.3 (77.5)	26.2 (79.2)	25.9 (78.6)	24.9 (76.8)	22.6 (72.7)	19.6 (67.3)	15.9 (60.6)	21.0 (69.8)
Mean daily minimum °C (°F)	10.3 (50.5)	11.6 (52.9)	14.1 (57.4)	17.9 (64.2)	20.7 (69.3)	22.6 (72.7)	23.3 (73.9)	23.1 (73.6)	21.9 (71.4)	19.1 (66.4)	15.6 (60.1)	11.7 (53.1)	17.7 (63.8)
Record low °C (°F)	−0.5 (31.1)	1.5 (34.7)	1.0 (33.8)	5.8 (42.4)	13.6 (56.5)	16.0 (60.8)	18.8 (65.8)	19.0 (66.2)	17.1 (62.8)	10.1 (50.2)	5.9 (42.6)	0.0 (32.0)	−0.5 (31.1)
Average precipitation mm (inches)	36.2 (1.43)	91.3 (3.59)	105.0 (4.13)	147.0 (5.79)	297.5 (11.71)	420.4 (16.55)	365.3 (14.38)	448.2 (17.65)	179.1 (7.05)	46.4 (1.83)	28.5 (1.12)	34.0 (1.34)	2,198.9 (86.57)
Average relative humidity (%)	77.1	78.1	78.4	81.6	79.8	80.2	80.3	80.5	78.7	76.2	75.3	75.0	78.4
Mean monthly sunshine hours	167.7	141.1	140.8	125.3	151.4	146.3	188.1	165.4	158.0	184.7	169.6	175.0	1,913.4
Source: Central Weather Administration (precipitation 1991–2015)
