= Kaohsiung City Music Hall =

Music hall in Yancheng, Kaohsiung, Taiwan

- 高雄市音樂館
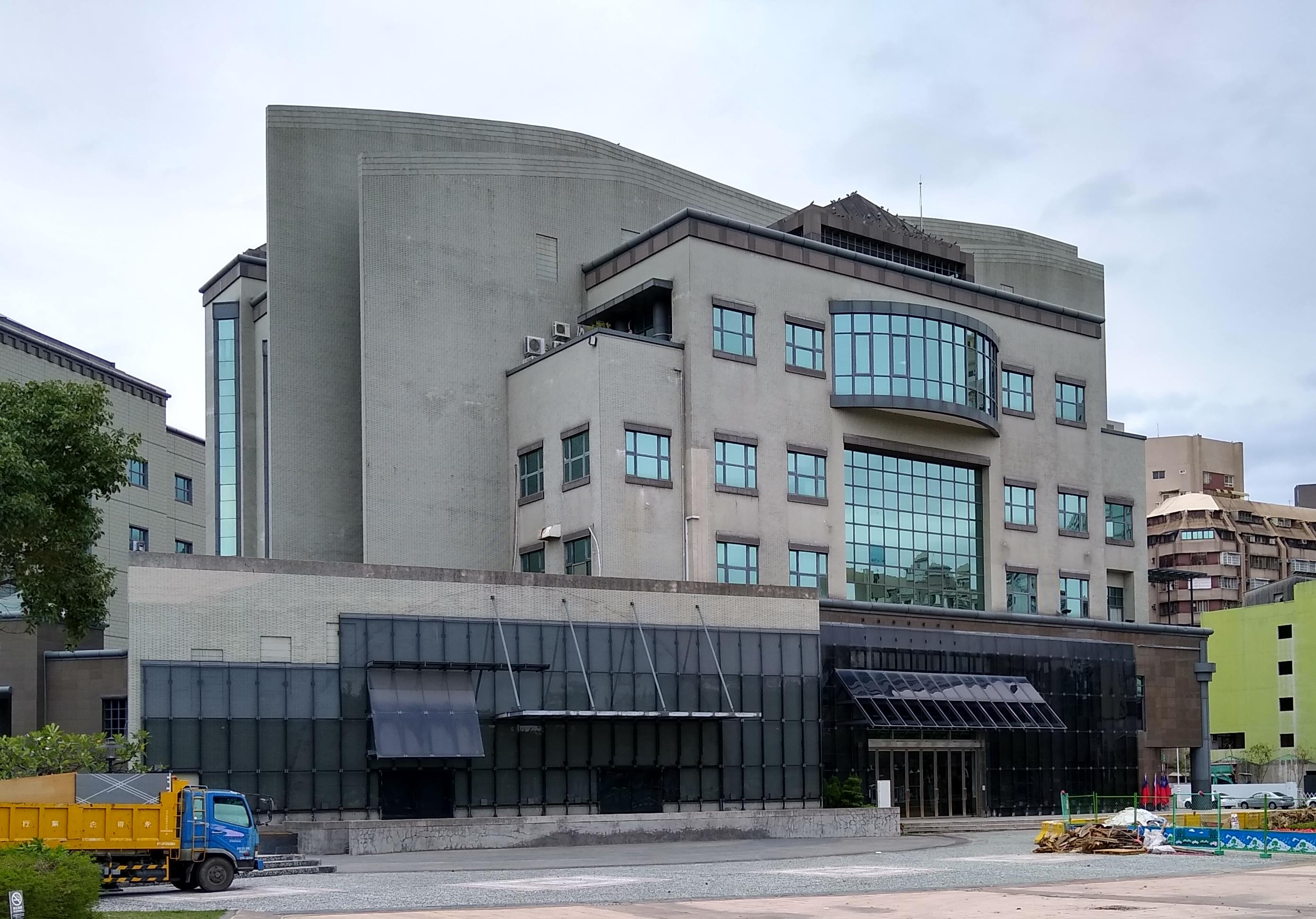
- Interactive map of Kaohsiung City Music Hall
- Location: Yancheng, Kaohsiung, Taiwan
- Coordinates: 22°37′39.6″N 120°17′13.0″E
- Type: music hall

Construction
- Opened: November 2000

Website
- Official website (in Chinese)

The Kaohsiung City Music Hall (KCMH; traditional Chinese: 高雄市音樂館; simplified Chinese: 高雄市音乐馆; pinyin: Gāoxióng Shì Yīnyuè Guǎn) is a music hall in Yancheng District, Kaohsiung, Taiwan.

== Architecture ==
The hall can accommodate up to 400 audience.

== History ==
The music hall was opened in November 2000.

== Transportation ==
The building is accessible within walking distance north east from Yanchengpu Station of Kaohsiung MRT.

== See also ==
- List of tourist attractions in Taiwan
