= Yancheng District, Kaohsiung =

District in Kaohsiung, Taiwan

Yancheng 鹽埕區 Entei, Iâm-tiânn
- District
- Yancheng District
- View down Xinhua Street

- Yancheng District in Kaohsiung City
- Coordinates: 22°37′28.798″N 120°17′12.462″E
- Country: Taiwan
- City: Kaohsiung

Area
  - Total: 1.4161 km^{2} (0.5468 sq mi)
- Elevation: 2 m (6.6 ft)

Population (October 2023)
  - Total: 22,524
  - Rank: 28
  - Density: 15,906/km^{2} (41,195/sq mi)
- Postal code: 803
- Website: yancheng.kcg.gov.tw (in Chinese)

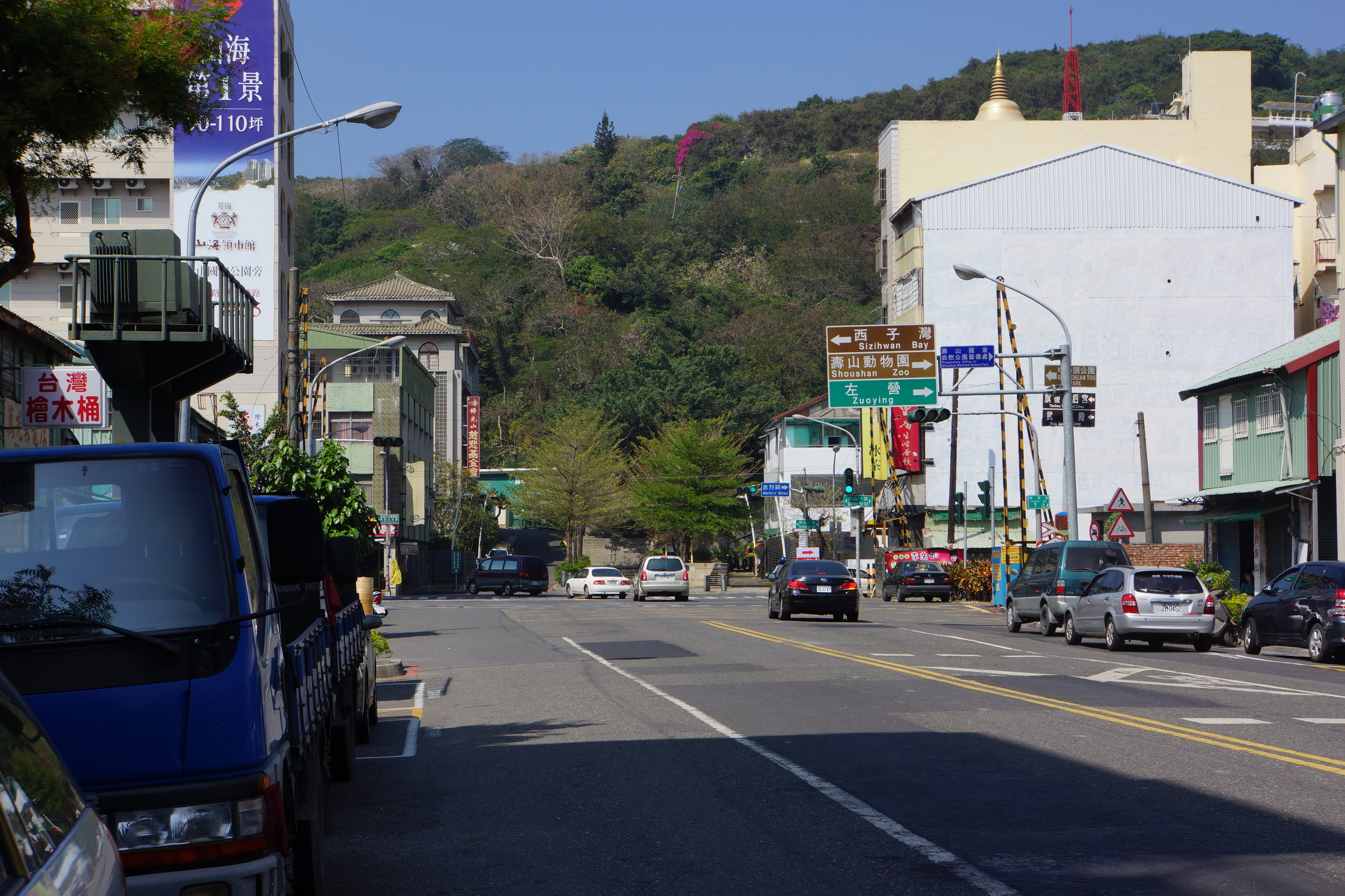
Street scene

Yancheng District (Chinese: 鹽埕區; pinyin: Yánchéng Qū; Wade–Giles: Yen²-chʻêng² Chʻü¹) is a district in Kaohsiung City, Taiwan. It is the smallest district in Kaohsiung City. It has been the least populous district of Kaohsiung since 2004. Yancheng District is also an old town of Kaohsiung.

== Geography ==
- Area: 1.416 square kilometres (0.547 sq mi)
- Population: 22,524 (October 2023)

== Administrative divisions ==
The district consists of Lanqiao, Ciai, Boai, Shouxing, Zhongshan, Jiaoren, Xinle, Zhongyuan, Guangming, Yuren, Hebin, Shade, Nanduan, Gangdou, Jiangxi, Xinfeng, Fubei, Liuqiao, Lainan, Xinhua and Jiangnan Village.

== Government ==
The representative for Yancheng on the city council is Lee Chiao-Ju.

== Tourist attractions ==
- International Convention Center Kaohsiung
- Kaohsiung City Music Hall
- Kaohsiung Film Archive
- Kaohsiung Museum of History
- Kaohsiung Music Center
- Love Pier
- Love River
- Pier-2 Art Center
  - Hamasen Museum of Taiwan Railway
- Yanchengpu Night Market

== Transportation ==
The district is accessible from Yanchengpu Station of the Kaohsiung Mass Rapid Transit. Five stations of the Circular light rail, Love Pier, Dayi Pier-2, Penglai Pier-2, Shoushan Park, and Wenwu Temple, serve the district.

== Notable natives ==
- Tiger Huang, singer.
- Yu Chen Yueh-ying, Magistrate of Kaohsiung County (1985-1993)
