= Pier-2 Art Center =

Art center in Yancheng, Kaohsiung, Taiwan

- 駁二藝術特區

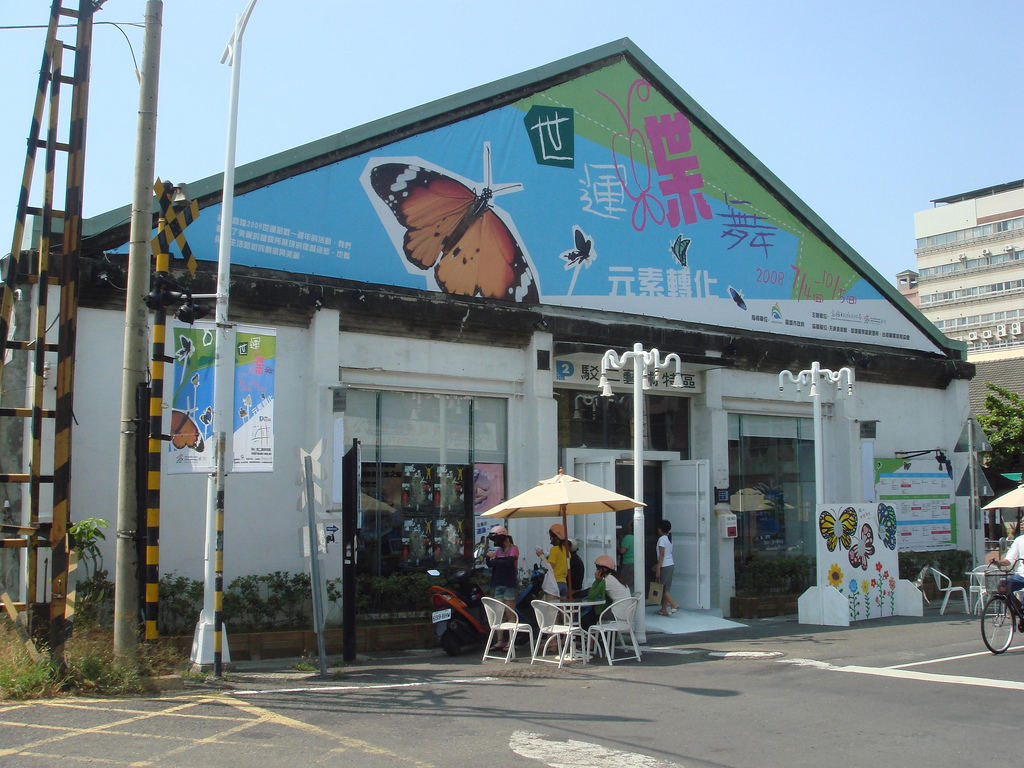
- Interactive map of the Pier-2 Art Center area

General information
- Type: arts center
- Location: Yancheng, Kaohsiung, Taiwan
- Coordinates: 22°37′11.6″N 120°16′54.2″E
- Completed: 1973

Website
- Official website

The Pier-2 Art Center (traditional Chinese: 駁二藝術特區; simplified Chinese: 驳二艺术特区; pinyin: Bó Èr Yìshù Tèqū) is an art center in Yancheng District, Kaohsiung, Taiwan.

== History ==
The arts center was originally an abandoned warehouse site due to Kaohsiung's shift from industrial city to service city. The warehouses were built in 1973. Due to the persistence of local artists, the area was finally released and remade to be an arts center. In 2006, the Bureau of Cultural Affairs of Kaohsiung City Government and under management of the Kaohsiung Pier-2 Art Development Association and Shu-Te University's art development workshop took over the center, starting a series of exhibitions.

On 9 March 2021 at 1:04 a.m., a fire broke out at one of the warehouse building of the center. The fire was extinguished two hours later which left the building with only its concrete walls and metal frames.

== Buildings ==
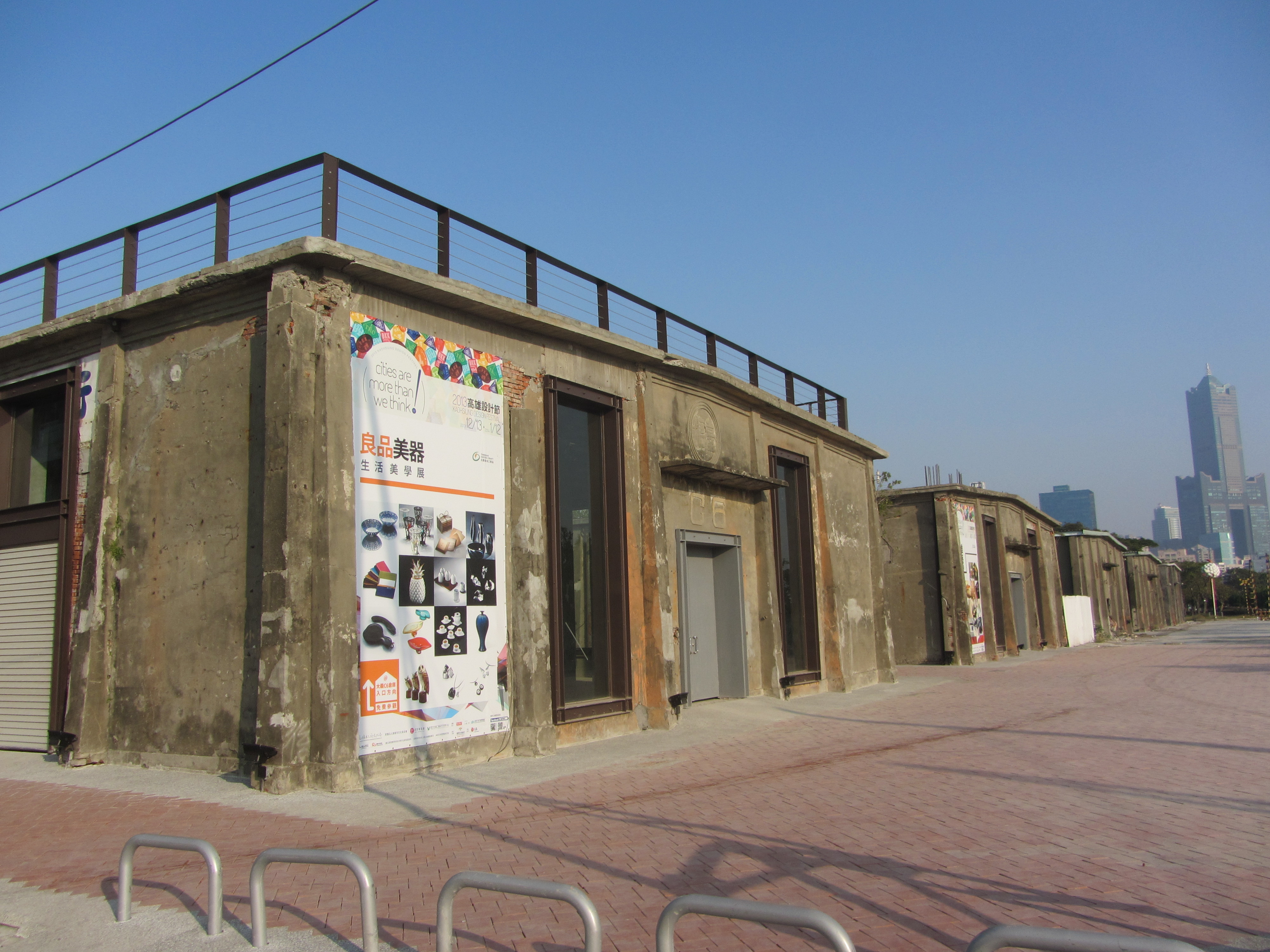
Dayi Warehouse

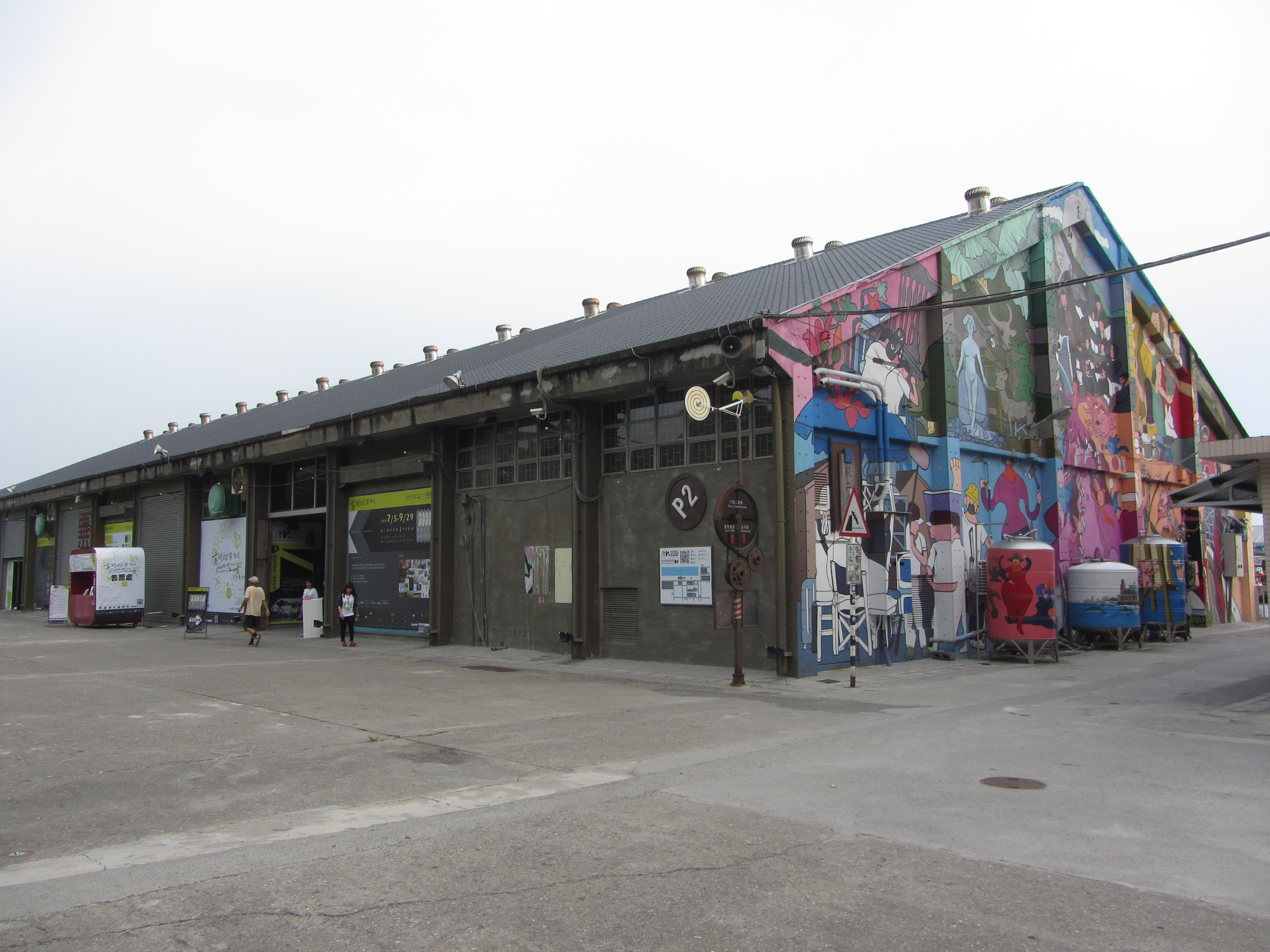
P2 Warehouse

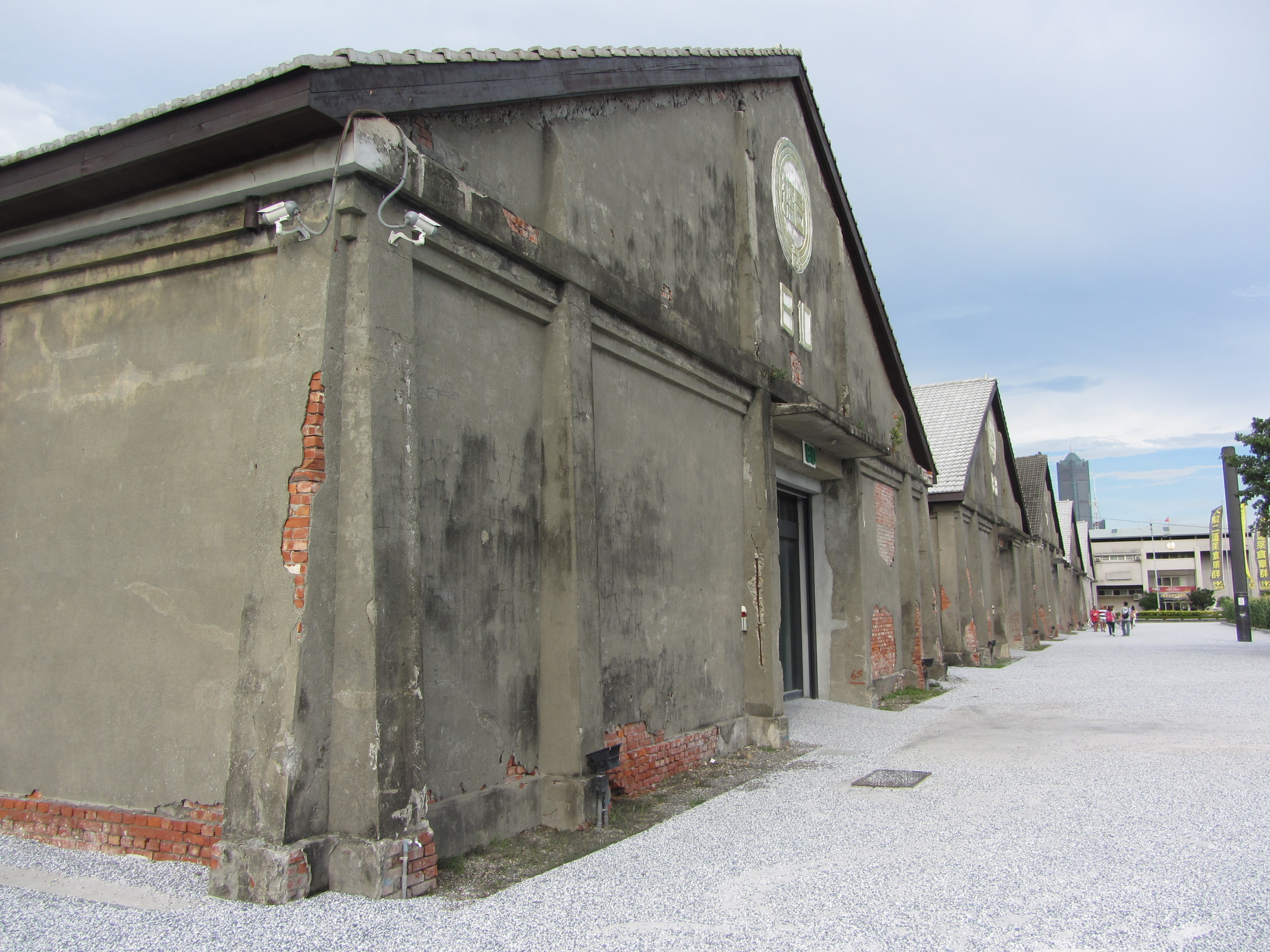
Penglai Warehouse

- Art Plaza
- Bicycle Warehouse
- C1+C2 Warehouse (In89 Cinemax)
- C3 Warehouse
- C5 Warehouse
- Dayi Warehouse
- Hamasen Museum of Taiwan Railway, located at Warehouse 7 and 8
- Moonlight Theater
- P2 Warehouse
- Penglai Warehouse
- Warehouse 9
- West Coast Bike Path

== Transportation ==
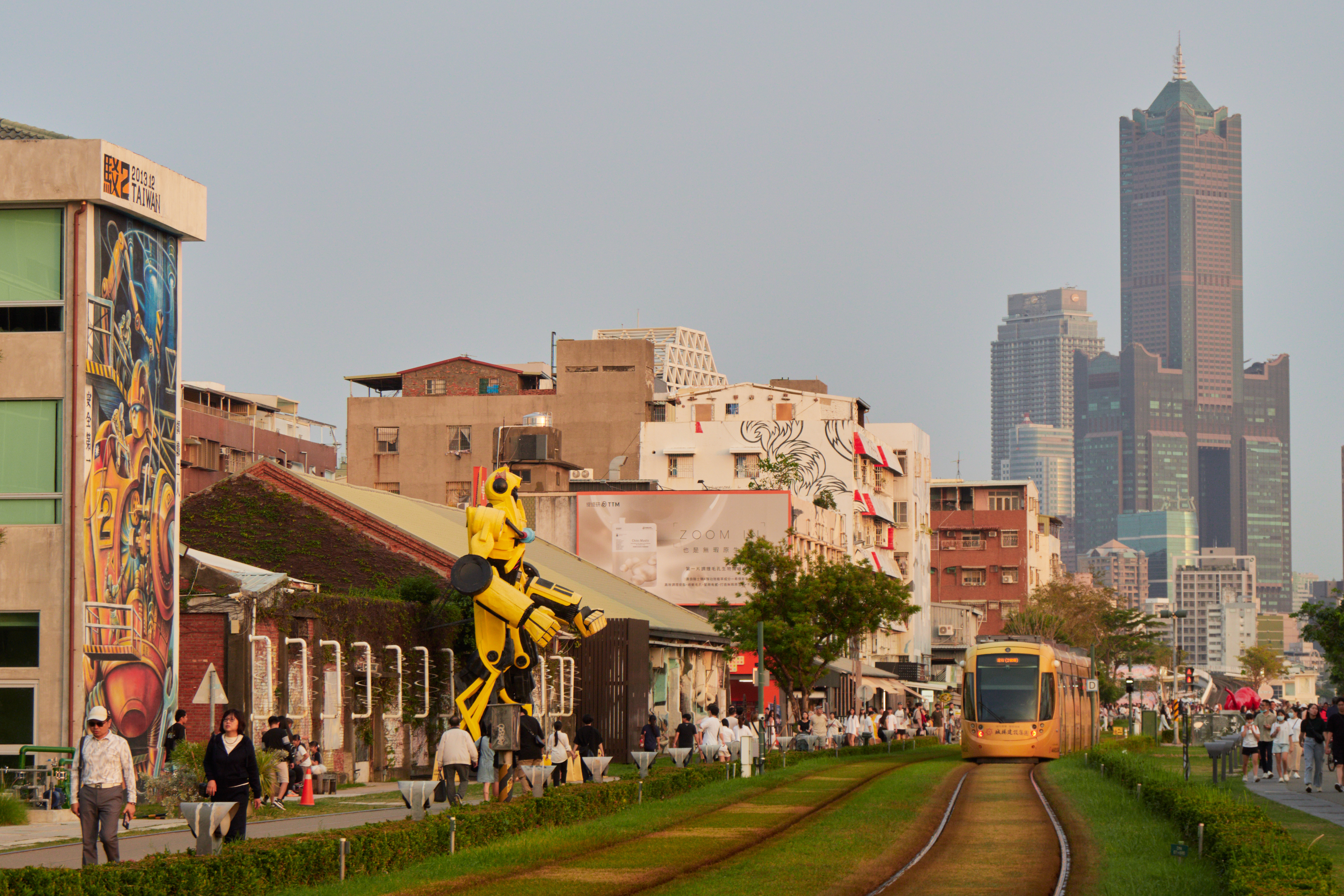
The Pier-2 Art Center with Kaohsiung LRT.

Since 2017, Pier-2 has included two stations of the Kaohsiung LRT:

- Dayi Pier-2 Station (駁二大義)
- Penglai Pier-2 Station (駁二蓬萊)

The center is also within walking distance of Yanchengpu Station, of the Kaohsiung MRT.

== See also ==
- List of tourist attractions in Taiwan
- Shu-Te University
