= Qianzhen =

Qianzhen may refer to:

- Qianzhen (乾貞; 927–929), the era name of the Emperor Rui of Yang Wu
- Shen Qianzhen (沈前珍), the school secretary of Jiangsu Qingjiang Middle School
- Tian Qianzhen (田乾真), An Lushan's general
- Chienchen River, Kaohsiung, Taiwan
- Cianjhen District, Kaohsiung, Taiwan

== See also ==
- Cianjhen Senior High School metro station, Kaohsiung Metro, Taiwan
- Cianjhen Star light rail station, Kaohsiung Metro, Taiwan
