= Kaixuan =

Kaixuan may refer to:

- Kaixuan (凱旋里), Lingya District, Kaohsiung, Taiwan
- Kaixuan (凱旋里), Yilan City, Yilan, Taiwan
- Kaixuan Subdistrict (凯旋街道), Jianggan District, Hangzhou, Zhejiang Province, China
- Wang Kaixuan (王凯旋), a character in Chinese film Mojin: The Lost Legend and Chronicles of the Ghostly Tribe
- Zhang Kaixuan (张凯旋), a character in Chinese film Vanguard
- Alice Tzeng (曾愷玹; pinyin: Zēng Kǎixuán; born 1984), a Taiwanese actress
- Kaisyuan metro station, Kaohsiung Metro, Taiwan
- Kaisyuan Night Market, Kaohsiung, Taiwan

== See also ==
- Kaisyuan Ersheng light rail station, Kaohsiung Metro, Taiwan
- Kaisyuan Jhonghua light rail station, Kaohsiung Metro, Taiwan
- Kaisyuan Park light rail station, Kaohsiung Metro, Taiwan
- Kaisyuan Rueitian light rail station, Kaohsiung Metro, Taiwan
- Kaisyuan Wuchang light rail station, Kaohsiung Metro, Taiwan
