= Caoya =

Caoya may refer to:

- Caoya, Kaohsiung, Taiwan
- Caoya metro station, Taiwan
