= Science and Technology Museum =

Science and Technology Museum may refer to:

== Asia ==
- Israel National Museum of Science, Technology, and Space in Haifa, Israel
- National Science and Technology Museum in Kaohsiung, Taiwan
- China Science and Technology Museum in Beijing, China
- Shanghai Science and Technology Museum in Shanghai, China
- Sichuan Science and Technology Museum in Sichuan, China

== Europe ==
- Museo Nazionale Scienza e Tecnologia Leonardo da Vinci in Milan, Italy
- National Museum of Science and Technology in La Coruña and Alcobendas, Spain
- Norwegian Museum of Science and Technology in Oslo, Norway
- Swedish National Museum of Science and Technology in Stockholm, Sweden

== North America ==
- Canada Science and Technology Museum in Ottawa, Ontario, Canada
- Milton J. Rubenstein Museum of Science and Technology in Syracuse, New York, USA
- Science & Technology Museum of Atlanta (SciTrek) in Atlanta, Georgia, USA

== South America ==
- Museum of Science and Technology in Rio Grande do Sul, Brazil

== Oceania ==
- Questacon in Canberra, Australia
- Scienceworks in Melbourne, Australia

== See also ==
- Science and Technology Museum railway station
