= Kaohsiung Museum of Fisheries Civilization =

Museum in Qianzhen, Kaohsiung, Taiwan

- 高雄市漁業文化館
- Established: April 2002
- Location: Cianjhen, Kaohsiung, Taiwan
- Coordinates: 22°34′20.3″N 120°19′00.4″E
- Type: museum
- Founder: Kaohsiung City Government
- Public transit access: Caoya MRT station

The Kaohsiung Museum of Fisheries Civilization (traditional Chinese: 高雄市漁業文化館; simplified Chinese: 高雄市渔业文化馆; pinyin: Gāoxióng Shì Yúyè Wénhuàguǎn) is a museum in Cianjhen District, Kaohsiung, Taiwan.

== History ==
The origin of the museum can be traced to the establishment of a cultural museum of squid fishery in April 2002 by the Taiwan Squid Association and a cultural museum of tuna fishery in November 2003 by the Taiwan Tuna Association. Later on, the Kaohsiung City Government combined the two museums to form the Kaohsiung Museum of Fisheries Civilization after obtaining a fund of NT$20 million from the Fisheries Agency.

== Exhibitions ==
The museum is divided into four exhibition areas, which are:

- Area A, for the far sea trawl fisheries zone, coastal and offshore fisheries zone, aquaculture zone
- Area B, tuna exhibition zone
- Area C, for the fisheries products processing zone, fisheries conservation and utilization zone
- Area D, squid exhibition zone

== Transportation ==
The museum is accessible within walking distance southwest of Caoya Station of Kaohsiung MRT.

== See also ==
- List of museums in Taiwan
