= KRTC =

KRTC may refer to:

- KRTC (FM), a radio station (88.7 FM) licensed to serve Truth or Consequence, New Mexico, United States; see List of radio stations in New Mexico
- Kaohsiung Rapid Transit Corporation
- Caoya metro station, of which name of secondary station is KRTC
