= Museum of Technology =

Museum of Technology may refer to:

- Technology museum, a type of museum
- Cambridge Museum of Technology, an industrial heritage museum in Cambridge, England
- German Museum of Technology, a museum in Berlin, Germany
- Mimms Museum of Technology and Art, a computer museum in Roswell, Georgia, USA
- Museum of Technology, Helsinki, a museum in Helsinki, Finland
- The Museum of Technology, a museum in Throckenholt, Lincolnshire, UK
- Technical Museum of the Empordà, a technology museum in Girona, Spain

== See also ==
- Science and Technology Museum, a set index article
