= Minzu railway station (Taiwan) =

Railway station in Sanmin, Kaohsiung, Taiwan

Minzu Station 民族車站
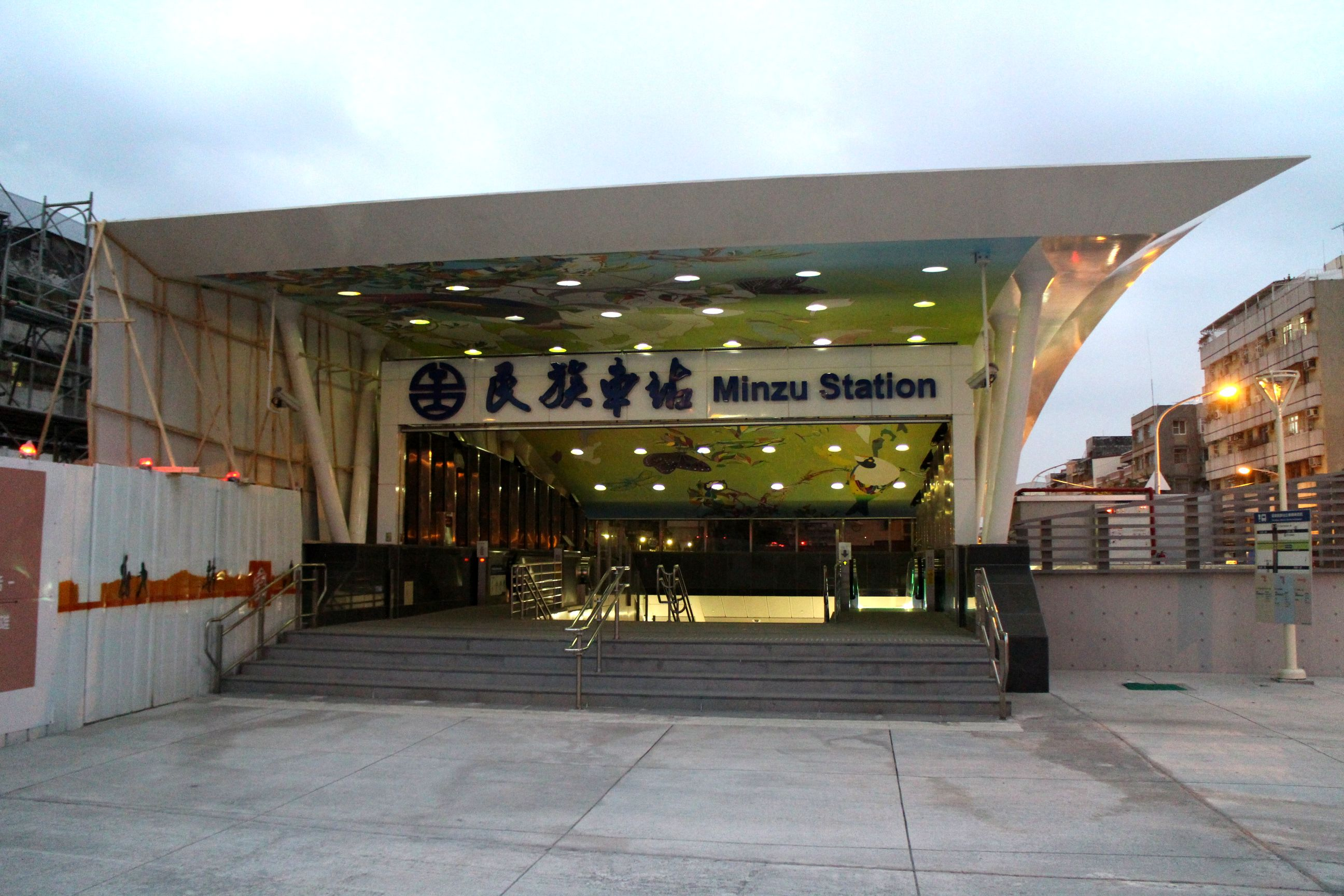

Chinese name
- Traditional Chinese: 民族車站
Transcriptions
Standard Mandarin
- Hanyu Pinyin: Mínzú Chēzhàn
- Bopomofo: ㄇㄧㄣˊ ㄗㄨˊ ㄔㄜ ㄓㄢˋ

General information
- Location: Sanmin, Kaohsiung; Taiwan
- Coordinates: 22°38′19.5″N 120°18′53.4″E
- System: Taiwan Railway railway station
- Line: Pingtung line
- Distance: 1.4 km to Kaohsiung
- Platforms: 2 side platforms
- Connections: Rapid transit (under construction); Local bus

Construction
- Structure type: Underground

Other information
- Station code: 337

History
- Opened: 14 October 2018; 7 years ago

Services
Preceding station	Taiwan Railway	Following station
Kaohsiung Terminus	Western Trunk line (Pingtung)	Science and Technology Museum towards Pingtung
Preceding station	Kaohsiung Metro	Following station
Under construction
Sinyi Elementary School towards Cruise Terminal or Cianjhen Senior High School	Yellow line	Dagang towards Dipu
Location

Minzu railway station (Chinese: 民族車站; pinyin: Mínzú Chēzhàn, "ethnic group") is a railway station located in Sanmin District, Kaohsiung, Taiwan. It is located on the Pingtung line and is operated by the Taiwan Railway. It is served by all local trains. It will be a future transfer station with the Yellow line of the Kaohsiung Metro.
