= Zhengyi railway station =

Railway station in Lingya, Kaohsiung, Taiwan

Zhengyi 正義
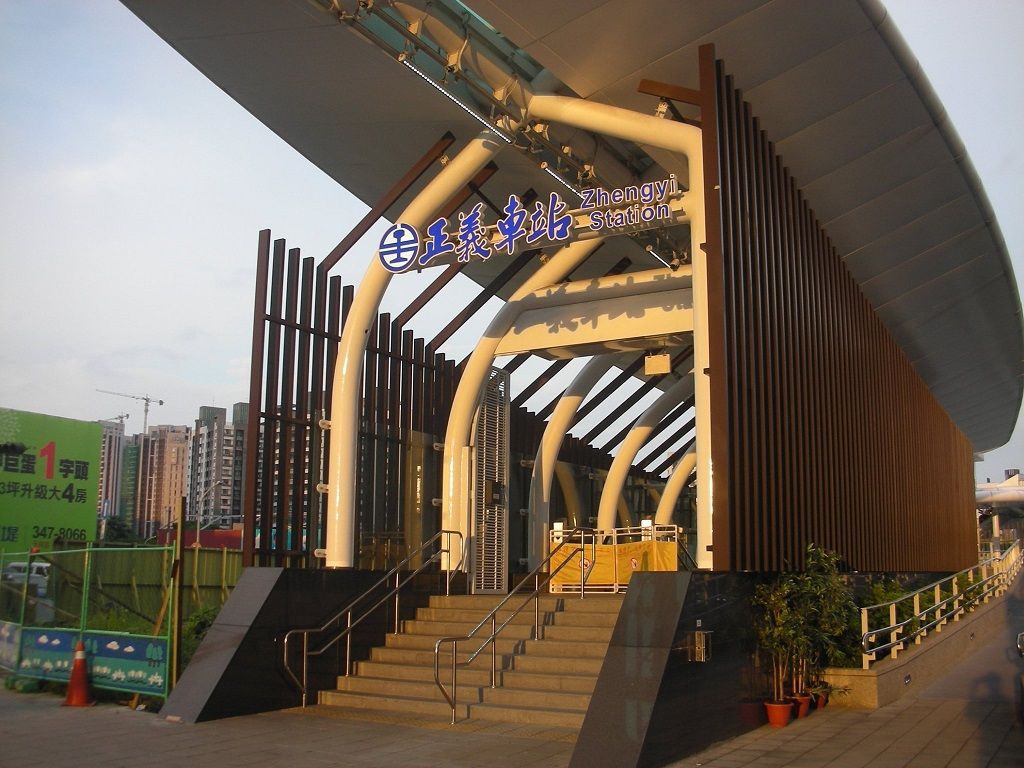
- Station entrance

Chinese name
- Traditional Chinese: 正義
Transcriptions
Standard Mandarin
- Hanyu Pinyin: Zhèngyì
- Bopomofo: ㄓㄥˋ ㄧˋ

General information
- Location: Lingya, Kaohsiung, Taiwan
- Coordinates: 22°38′03.1″N 120°20′34.0″E
- System: Taiwan Railway railway station
- Line: Pingtung line
- Distance: 4.2 km to Kaohsiung
- Platforms: 2 side platforms
- Connections: Rapid transit (under construction); Local bus

Construction
- Structure type: Underground

Other information
- Station code: 339

History
- Opened: 14 October 2018; 7 years ago

Services
Preceding station	Taiwan Railway	Following station
Science and Technology Museum towards Kaohsiung	Western Trunk line (Pingtung)	Fongshan towards Fangliao
Preceding station	Kaohsiung Metro	Following station
Under Construction
Weiwuying towards Cruise Terminal or Cianjhen Senior High School	Yellow line	Baoye Park towards Dipu
Location

Zhengyi railway station (Chinese: 正義車站; pinyin: Zhèngyì Chēzhàn, "justice") is a railway station in Lingya District, Kaohsiung, Taiwan. It is on the Pingtung line and is operated by Taiwan Railway. It is served by all local trains. It will be a future transfer station with the Yellow line of the Kaohsiung Metro.

Zhengyi station was opened along with Kaohsiung's moving its at-grade railroad underground to improve traffic. It was opened along with seven other new stations on the West Coast and Pingtung lines.
