= Sanduo Shopping District metro station =

Metro station in Lingya, Kaohsiung, Taiwan

Sanduo Shopping District R8/Y14 三多商圈
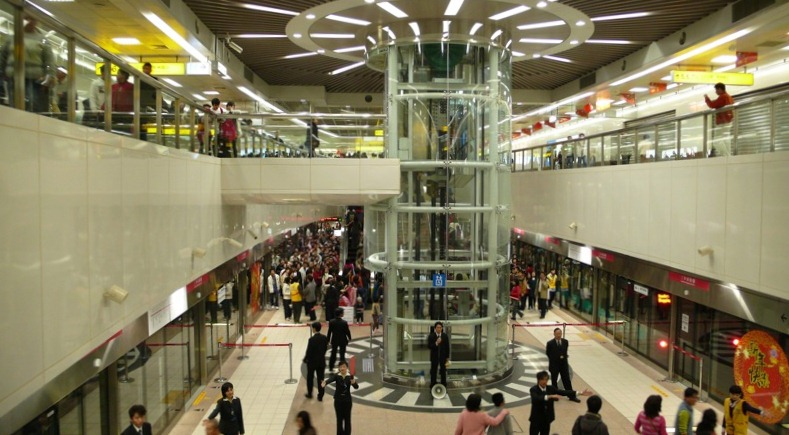
- Sanduo Shopping District station platform

Chinese name
- Traditional Chinese: 三多商圈車站
- Simplified Chinese: 三多商圈车站
Transcriptions
Standard Mandarin
- Hanyu Pinyin: Sānduō Shāngquān Chēzhàn
- Bopomofo: ㄙㄢ ㄉㄨㄛ ㄕㄤ ㄑㄩㄢ ㄔㄜ ㄓㄢˋ
- Wade–Giles: San^{1}-tuo^{1} Shang^{1}-ch'üan^{1} Ch'ê^{1}-chan^{4}
- Tongyong Pinyin: Sanduo Shangcyuan Chejhàn
Southern Min
- Hokkien POJ: Sàm-to Siong-khoan Chhia-chām

General information
- Location: Lingya, Kaohsiung; Taiwan
- Coordinates: 22°36′50″N 120°18′16.4″E
- Operated by: Kaohsiung Rapid Transit Corporation
- Line: Red line (R8)
- Platforms: One island platform

Construction
- Structure type: Underground

History
- Opened: 2008-03-09

Passengers
- 19,118 daily (Jan. 2011)

Services
| Preceding station | Kaohsiung Metro | Following station |
|---|---|---|
| Central Park towards Gangshan | Red line | Shihjia towards Siaogang |
Location

Sanduo Shopping District is a station on the Red line of Kaohsiung MRT in Lingya District, Kaohsiung, Taiwan. The station is named after the Sanduo Shopping District. It will be a future transfer station with the Yellow line.

== Station overview ==
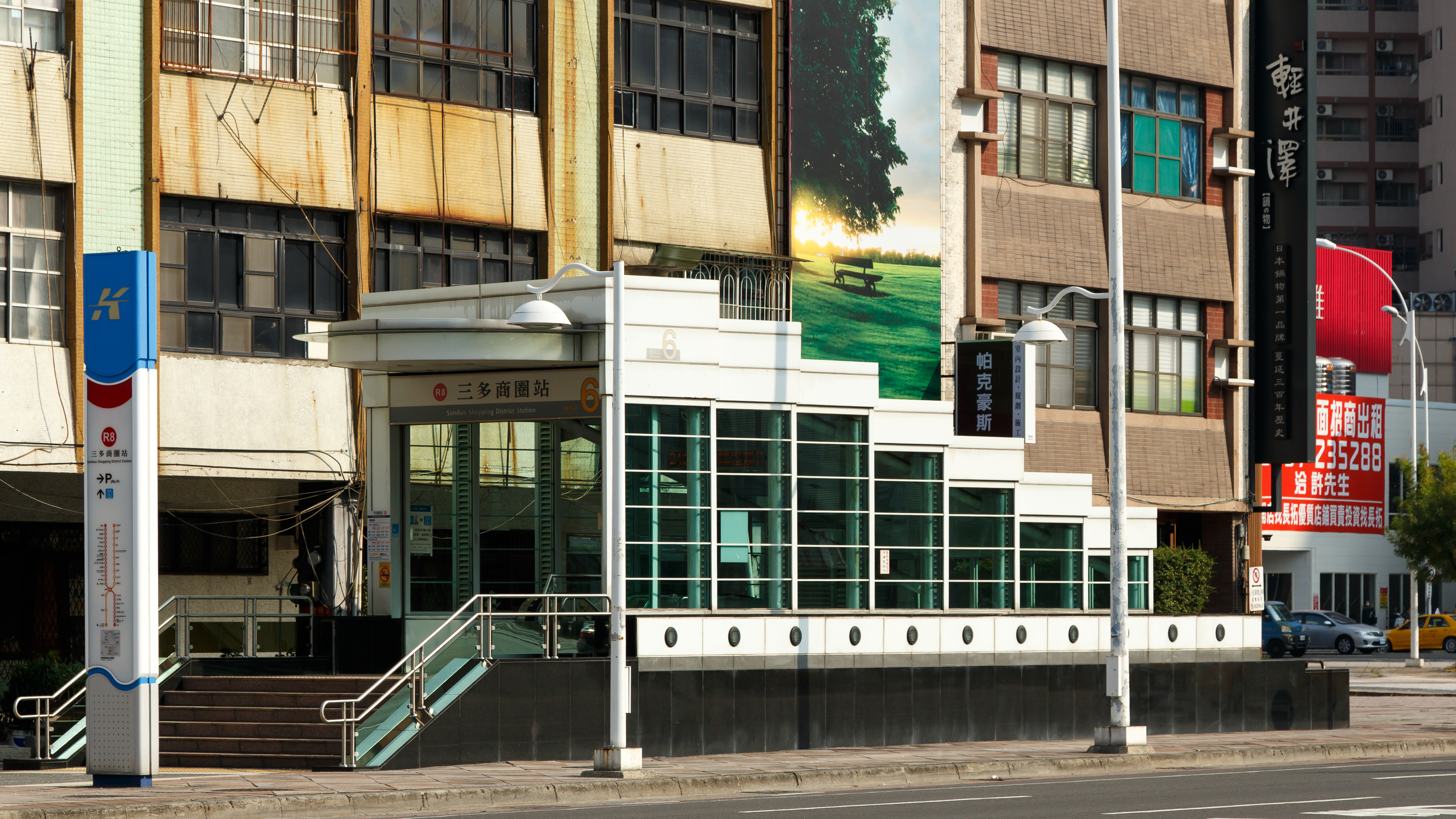
Sanduo Shopping District station exit 1

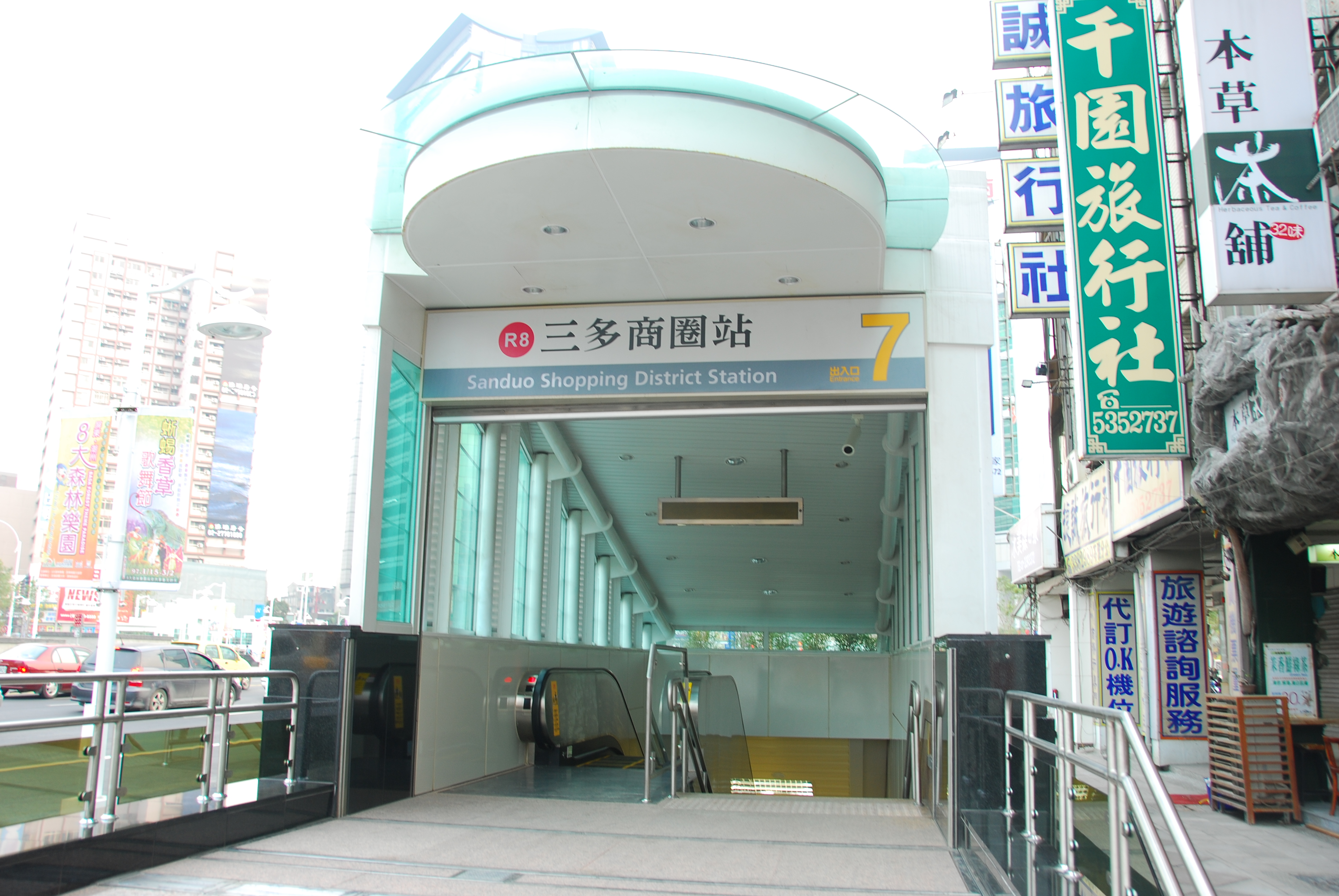
Sanduo Shopping District station exit 7

This is a two-level, underground station with an island platform and seven exits. It is 213 meters long and is located at the intersection of Zhongshan 2nd Rd. and Sanduo 3rd Rd.

The station is unique in the Kaohsiung MRT for two reasons. It is the only underground station with an open platform, allowing for passengers to see the platform directly from the lobby area (similar to many underground stations on the Taipei Metro). It also has an elevator with a unique design; the structure is incorporated both into the lighting on the ceiling as well as the platform level.

This will be a transfer station with the Yellow line in the future.

== Around the station ==
- 85 Sky Tower
- Chen Jhong-he Memorial Hall
- Kaohsiung Exhibition Center
- Singuang Ferry Wharf
- Sanduo Shopping Circle
- Singuang Boulevard
- Shin Kong Mitsukoshi Department Store
- Pacific SOGO Department Store
- Far Eastern Department Store, Vieshow Cinemas
- Wunheng Night Market
- Yisin Road
- Guangnan Sanduo Store
- Sanduo Cineplex
- Lingya Junior High School
- Lingjhou Elementary School
- Shihjia Park
- Shengrih Park (Birthday Park)
- Sihwei Park
- Hotel Sunshine Kaoshiung
