= Jin-Zuan Night Market =

Night market in Qianzhen, Kaohsiung, Taiwan

Jin-Zuan Night Market 金鑽觀光夜市
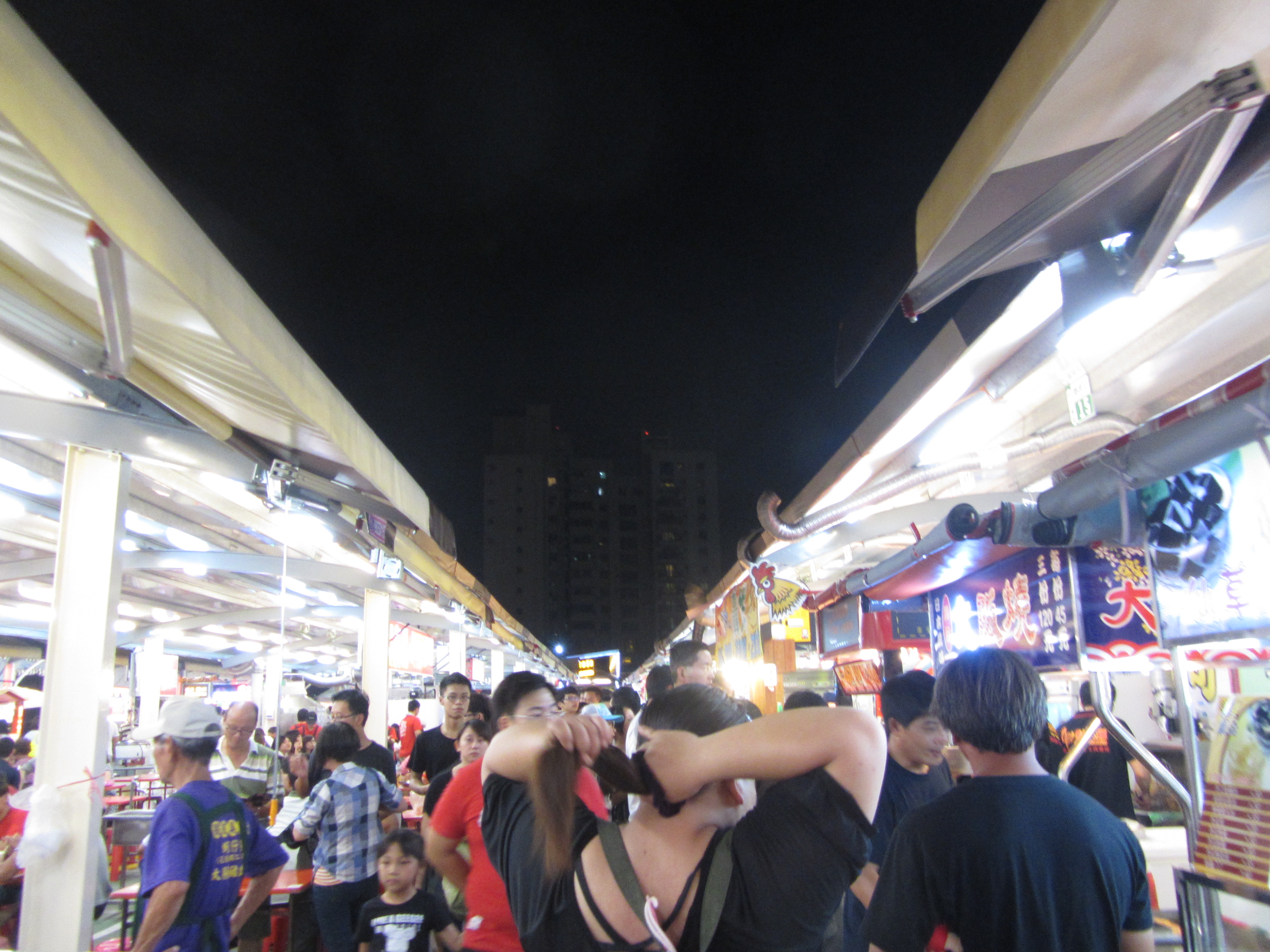
- Location: Cianjhen, Kaohsiung, Taiwan; 22°36′N 120°19′E
- Opening date: July 2013
- Environment: night market
- Number of tenants: 500 stalls
- Total retail floor area: 3 hectares
- Parking: 500 cars and 1,000 scooters
- Interactive map of Jin-Zuan Night Market

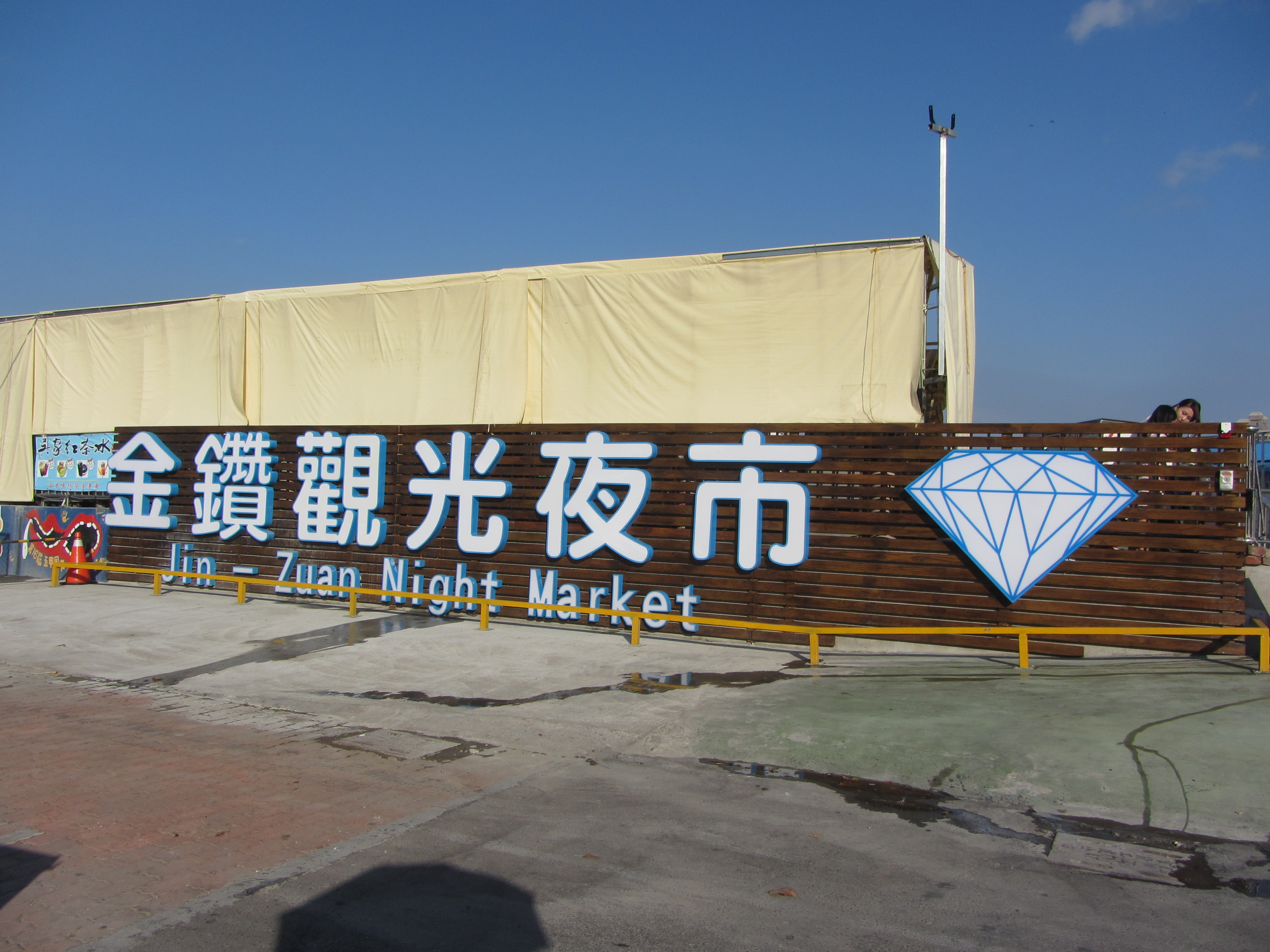
Jin-Zhuan Night Market entrance sign

The Jin-Zuan Night Market (traditional Chinese: 金鑽觀光夜市; simplified Chinese: 金钻观光夜市; pinyin: Jīnzuān Guānguāng Yèshì) is a night market in Cianjhen District, Kaohsiung, Taiwan. Together with the adjacent Kaisyuan Night Market, they form the largest night market in Taiwan.

== History ==
The night market was opened in July 2013.

== Features ==
The night market is shaped into a large constellation for easy visitor navigation around the vendors. It covers an area of 30,000 m^{2} with over 500 of stalls offering a wide variety of Taiwanese food, drinks and goods. The parking lot offers spaces for 500 cars and 1,000 scooters.

== Transportation ==
The night market is accessible within walking distance North East of Kaisyuan Station of Kaohsiung MRT. The night market also provides complementary shuttle bus service that runs every five minutes interval from the station to the market.

== See also ==
- Night markets in Taiwan
- List of night markets in Taiwan
