= SKM Park =

Shopping mall in Qianzhen, Kaohsiung, Taiwan

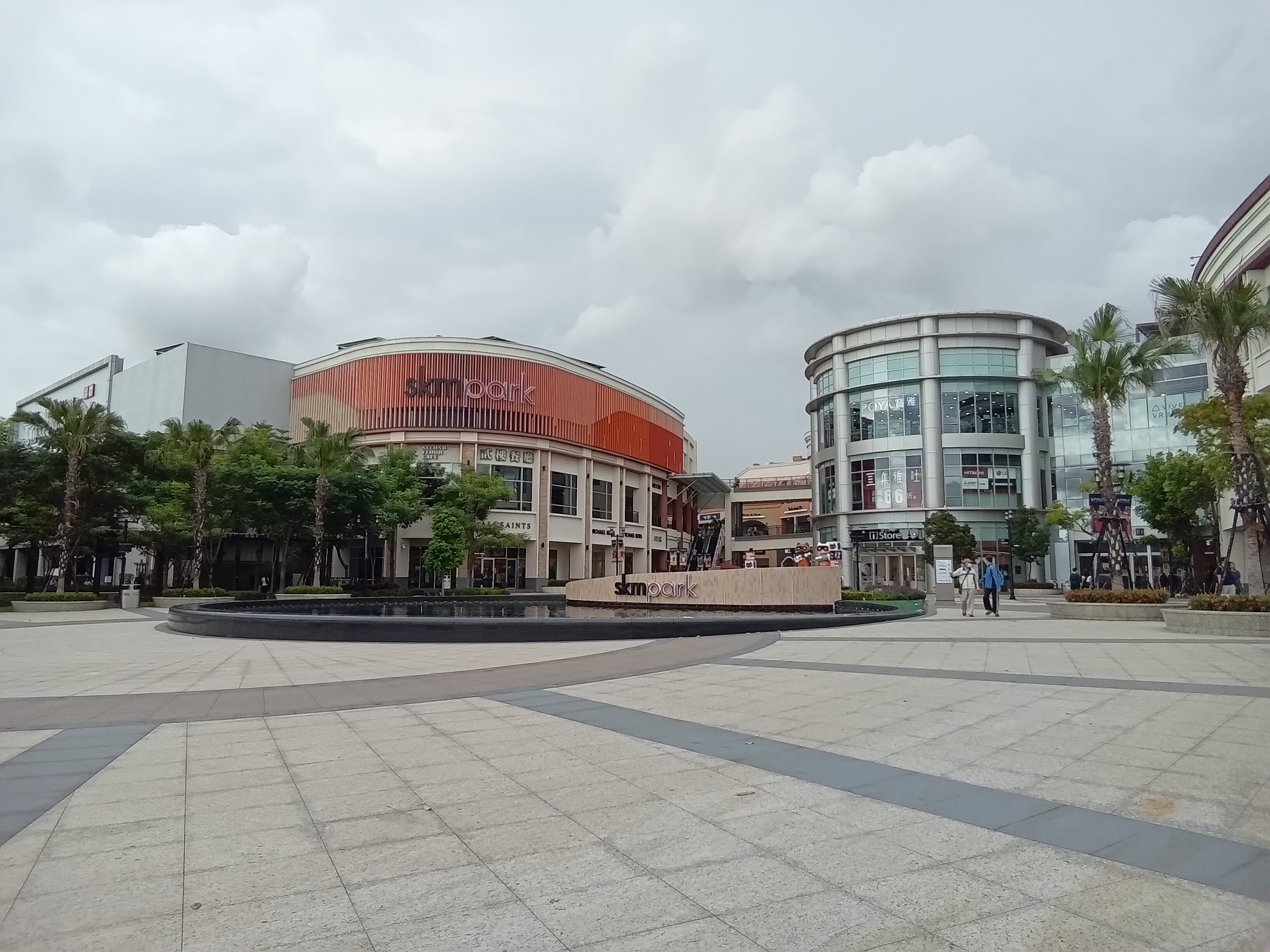
- Location: Cianjhen, Kaohsiung, Taiwan
- Coordinates: 22°35′0.6″N 120°19′46.8″E
- Opened: 9 May 2016
- Developer: Shin Kong Group
- Floor area: 87,120 m^{2} 159,768.03m^{2}(parking included)
- Floors: 4; 1 below ground
- Public transit: Caoya Station
- Website: Official website (in Chinese)

Former brand

The SKM Park is an amusement park and outlet in Cianjhen District, Kaohsiung, Taiwan. It is owned by Shin Kong Mitsukoshi.

== History ==
SKM Park was originally opened on 9 May 2016 as Taroko Park during a grand opening ceremony attended by Taroko Group officials and Kaohsiung Mayor Chen Chu.

On 26 January 2022, Taroko Park was reopened under the name of SKM Park and officially transformed into an outlet mall.

== Location ==
The park spreads over an area of 87,120 m^{2}. It features a 600-meter long circuit race track covering an area of 30,000 m^{2}. The shopping center consists of more than 200 retailers built with European architecture style.

The park is accessible from exit 2 of the Caoya Station of the Red line of Kaohsiung Metro.

== See also ==
- List of tourist attractions in Taiwan
- E-Da Outlet Mall
- Dream Mall
- Hanshin Arena Shopping Plaza
