= Yellow line (Kaohsiung Metro) =

Planned metro line in Kaohsiung, Taiwan

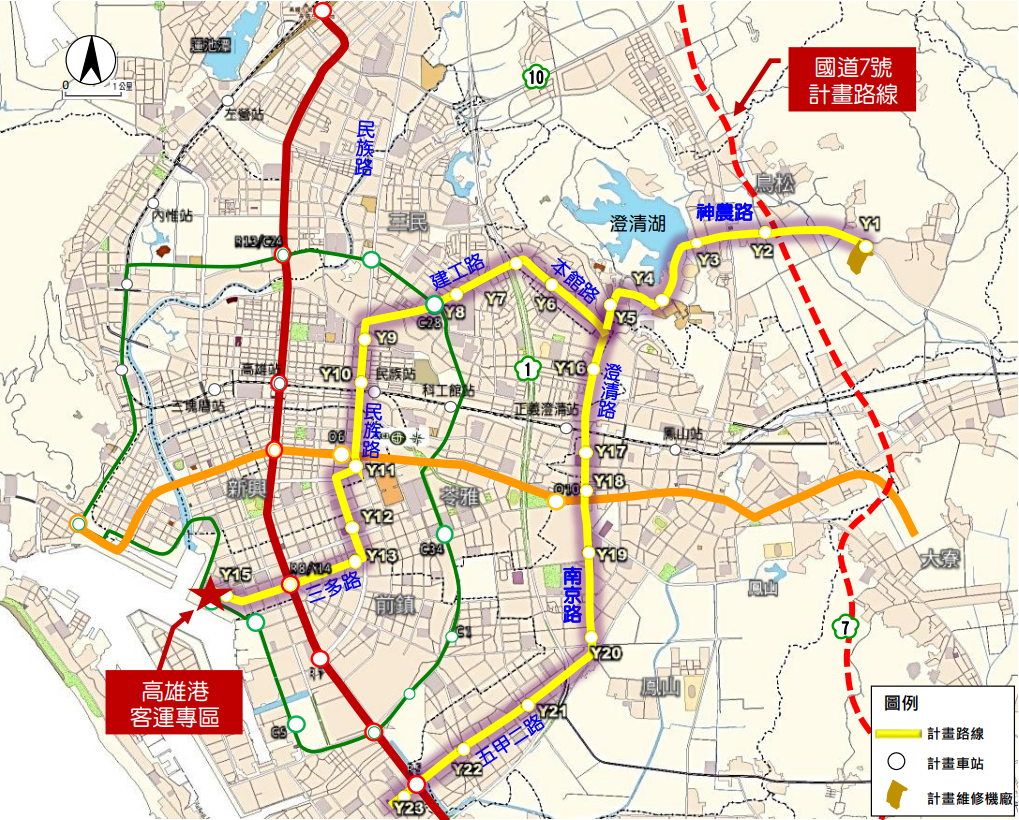
- Yellow line route map

Overview
- Other name: Kaohsiung Metropolitan line
- Native name: 高雄捷運都會線（黃線）
- Status: Under construction
- Locale: Kaohsiung City, Republic of China (Taiwan)
- Termini: Kaohsiung Cruise Terminal Station & Cianjhen Senior High School Station; Lanpu/Dipu
- Stations: 23

Service
- Type: Medium-capacity rail transport system
- System: Kaohsiung Metro
- Operator: Kaohsiung Rapid Transit Corporation
- Depot: Niaosong depot
- Rolling stock: 25 Stadler Automated EMU

History
- Planned opening: 2032–2034 (expected)

Technical
- Character: Underground, elevated
- Track gauge: 1,435 mm (4 ft 8 1/2 in) standard gauge
- Electrification: Third Rail
- Signalling: Siemens Trainguard MT CBTC with subsystems of ATC, ATO GoA 4 (UTO), ATP, ATS and CBI

The Yellow line, also known as the Kaohsiung Metropolitan line, is a planned medium capacity rapid transit line on the Kaohsiung Metro. This was approved by the Executive Yuan in March 2022, and construction started in 2023.

== History ==
The initial plan of the Yellow line was first seen in 2002 when the whole MRT construction plan for Kaohsiung was being re-sketched.

By the spring of 2015, director Wu Yi-Long (吳義隆) of the Kaohsiung City Government's Mass Rapid Transit Bureau informed the local parliament that the Yellow line was undergoing feasibility assessment. Its route was likely a combination of the old-drafted Yellow line and Brown line, and was hoped to be the second circular public transportation line across Kaohsiung City, preceded by the first circular line in Kaohsiung and the whole nation.

On 14 February 2017, four members of the Legislative Yuan representing Kaohsiung and affiliated with the Democratic Progressive Party, namely Liu Shyh-fang, Lee Kun-tse, Lai Jui-lung, and Hsu Chih-chieh, held a joint press conference unveiling the new draft of the route for the Yellow line.They asked the Executive Yuan to approve the plan, whose bid was later agreed and approved by the yuan to be included on March 23.

On March 27, a few days after the approval of the Executive Yuan's approval, the local MRT bureau submitted the feasibility study of the Yellow line to the authorities concerned of the central government. In the study, the line was planned to be an underground system whose route combined the previously planned Brown line, Fongshan line, and Wujia section of the Green line.

In March 2022, the Executive Yuan approved the construction of the line, due for completion by 2028.

In November 2024, it was announced that the opening would be delayed to 2032 and 2034 for the first (Y1-Y8, Y1-Y18) and second (Y8-Y15, Y18-Y23) phases, respectively.

== Stations ==
The Yellow line has two start points, Cruise Terminal and MRT Cianjhen Senior High School Station, and an end point at Niaosong Depot, Niaosong District, Kaohsiung City. The section from Y1 to Y15 is also called Jiangong-Minzu (建工民族) line, while the section between Y1 and Y23 is called Chenching-Wujia (澄清五甲) line.

There will be three service patterns tentatively operating every 10 minutes (Y23-Y1, Y15-Y1, Y23-Y5-Y15) which will provide equal five-minute headways to all stations.

Please note that the station names and locations are tentatively planned.

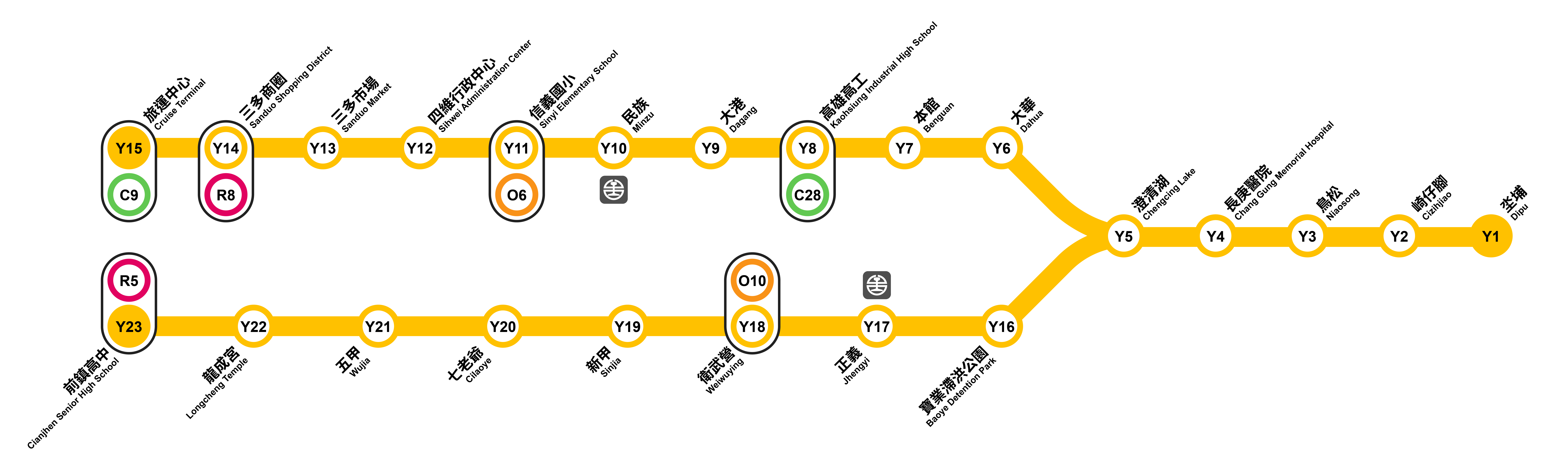
Proposed station names and their locations

Branch		Code	Station name		Transfer	Location
Branch		Code	English	Chinese	Transfer	Location
●	●	Y01	Lanpu	坔埔		Niaosong District
●	●	Y02	Cizhijiao	崎子腳		Niaosong District
●	●	Y03	Niaosong	鳥松		Niaosong District
●	●	Y04	Chang Gung Memorial Hospital	長庚醫院		Niaosong District
●	●	Y05	Chengcing Lake	澄清湖		Niaosong District
●	｜	Y06	Dahua	大華		Niaosong District
●	｜	Y07	Benguan	本館		Niaosong District
●	｜	Y08	Kaohsiung Industrial High School	高雄高工	Circular light rail	Sanmin District
●	｜	Y09	Dagang	大港		Sanmin District
●	｜	Y10	Minzu	民族	Pingtung Line	Sanmin District
●	｜	Y11	Sinyi Elementary School Station	信義國小	Orange line (Kaohsiung Metro)	Sinsing District
●	｜	Y12	Sihwei Administration Center	四維行政中心		Cianjhen District; Lingya District
●	｜	Y13	Sanduo Market	三多市場		Cianjhen District; Lingya District
●	｜	Y14	Sanduo Shopping District	三多商圈	Red line (Kaohsiung Metro)	Cianjhen District; Lingya District
●	｜	Y15	Cruise Terminal	旅運中心	Circular light rail	Lingya District
	●	Y16	Baoye Detention Park	寶業滯洪公園		Sanmin District
	●	Y17	Zhengyi	正義	Pingtung Line	Lingya District
	●	Y18	Weiwuying	衛武營	Orange line (Kaohsiung Metro)	Lingya District
	●	Y19	Sinjia	新甲		Fongshan District
	●	Y20	Cilaoye	七老爺		Fongshan District
	●	Y21	Wujia	五甲		Fongshan District
	●	Y22	Longcheng Temple	龍成宮		Fongshan District
	●	Y23	Cianjhen Senior High School	前鎮高中	Red line (Kaohsiung Metro)	Cianjhen District

== Rolling stock ==
The line will be operated by 25 three-car trains produced by Stadler Rail in St. Margrethen. The trains will be automated using a CBTC system supplied by Siemens Mobility.

A mockup of the trains was revealed on August 28, 2026

== See also ==
- Rapid transit in Taiwan
- Taipei Metro
- Kaohsiung Metro
- Taoyuan Metro
- Taichung MRT
