= Singuang Ferry Wharf =

Wharf in Lingya, Kaohsiung, Taiwan

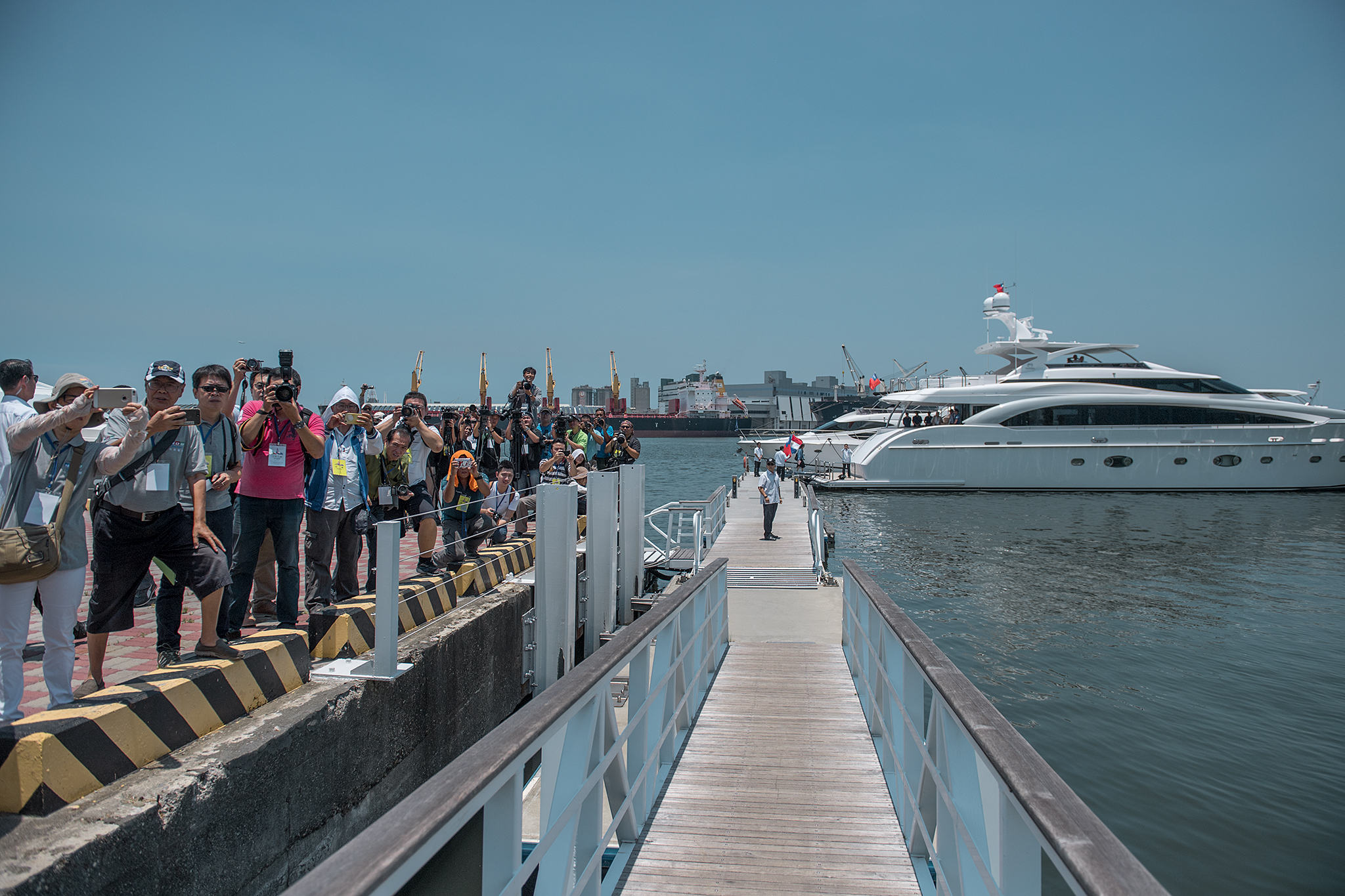
- Interactive map of Singuang Ferry Wharf
- Location within Taiwan
- Native name: 新光碼頭

Location
- Location: Lingya, Kaohsiung, Taiwan
- Coordinates: 22°36′34.4″N 120°17′48.1″E

Details
- Type of Harbor: wharf

The Singuang Ferry Wharf (traditional Chinese: 新光碼頭; simplified Chinese: 新光码头; pinyin: Xīnguāng Mǎtóu) is a wharf in Lingya District, Kaohsiung, Taiwan. It is the 22nd pier of Port of Kaohsiung.

== Architecture ==
The wharf features the Seaboard Park and Shinkong Avenue. It has a ring-shaped walkway that provides a great view of the harbor.

== Festivities ==
In the past, the Kaohsiung Lantern Festival, Kaohsiung International Container Arts Festival, and New Year's Eve were held here every year.

== Transportation ==
The wharf is accessible within walking distance west from Sanduo Shopping District Station of Kaohsiung MRT. The wharf can also be accessed by walking southwest of the Kaohsiung Exhibition Center light rail station.

== See also ==
- List of tourist attractions in Taiwan
