= E-Da Outlet Mall =

Shopping mall in Dashu, Kaohsiung, Taiwan

- 義大世界購物廣場

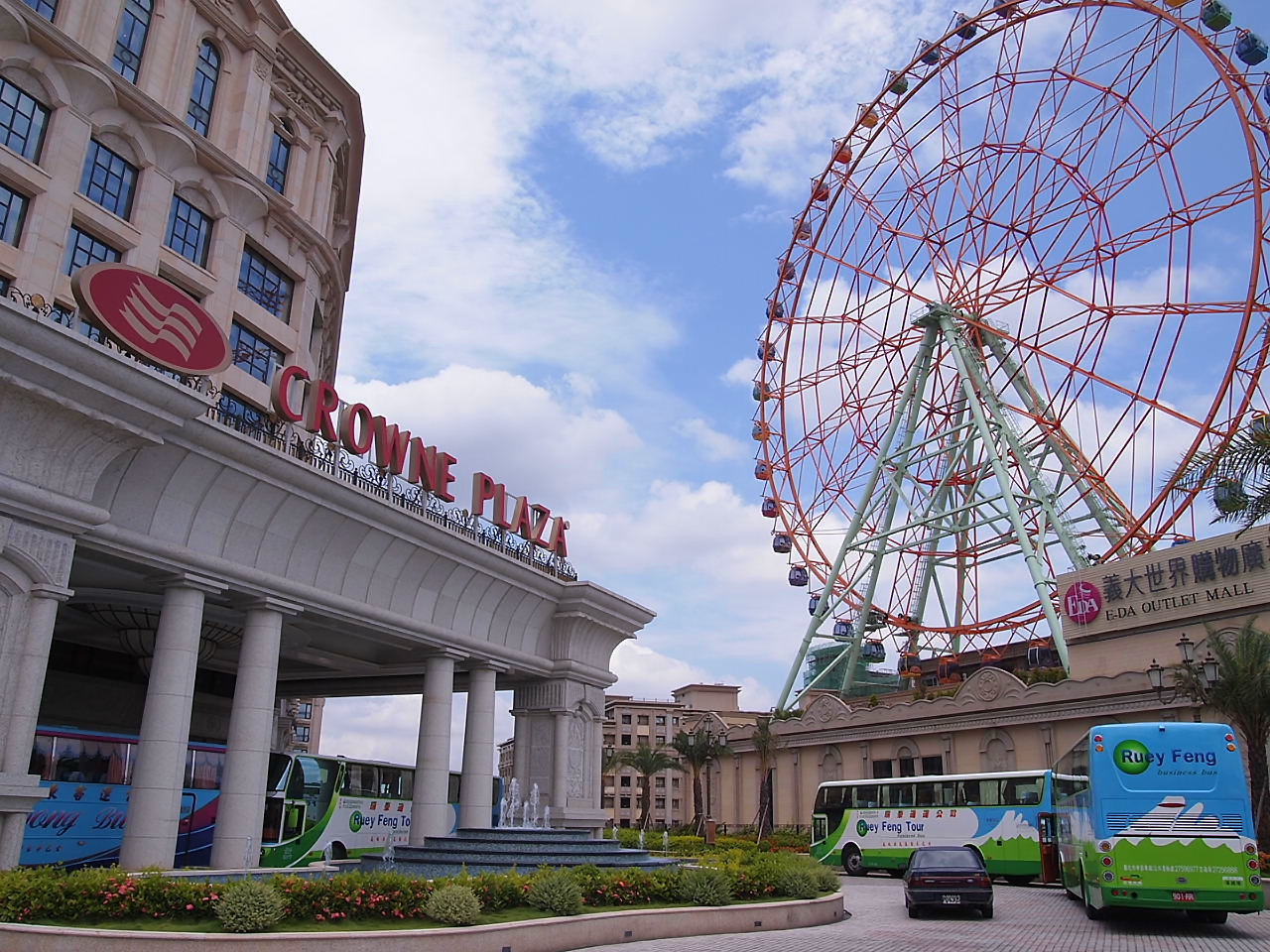
- Location: No. 12, Section 1, Xuecheng Road, Dashu District, Kaohsiung, Taiwan
- Coordinates: 22°43′48″N 120°24′23″E
- Opened: December 18, 2010
- Manager: E United Group
- Floor area: 185,628.92 m^{2} (1,998,093.1 sq ft)
- Floors: 12 floors above ground 4 floors below ground
- Parking: 2570
- Website: www.edamall.com.tw

The E-Da Outlet Mall (Chinese: 義大世界購物廣場; pinyin: Yìdà shìjiè gòuwù guǎngchǎng) is an outlet store in Dashu District, Kaohsiung, Taiwan that opened on December 18, 2010. It is the first outlet mall in Taiwan. With a total floor area of 185,628.92 m^{2} (1,998,093.1 sq ft), the neoclassical-style mall has facilities including a ferris wheel, cinema, entertainment park and hotel.

== Origin and location ==
After the Taiwanese company E United, which was founded by the entrepreneur Lin I-shou, had already put I-Shou University (1986) and the E-Da hospital (2004) into operation, the next major project was the construction of the shopping, hotel and leisure complex E-Da World into operation. The name of the project is based on 義大 (Yìdà), the short name of I-Shou University, in the immediate vicinity of which construction work began in March 2006. After a little more than four years, the mall was put into trial operation on June 19, 2010 and officially opened on December 18 of the same year.

A shuttle bus runs between the E-Da Outlet Mall and the Zuoying HSR station. The journey time is around 20 minutes. The mall is also visited by numerous foreign tourists, especially tour groups from China and Japan.

== Facilities ==
A multi-storey shopping center complex, two hotels, a cinema, a theater and an amusement park are located on the approximately 90 hectare E-DA world site.

With a sales area of 185,628.92 m^{2} (1,998,093.1 sq ft), the shopping complex is one of the largest shopping centers in Asia. Almost all renowned international brands are offered here. The complex also includes sports facilities, cinemas and restaurants. A European neoclassical style was adopted in the architecture of the mall.

The two hotels are the E-Da Skylark Hotel (358 rooms) and the E-Da Crowne Plaza Hotel (656 rooms). Both are equipped with a wide range of restaurants and rooms for various events and conferences.

The E-DA Royal Theater, the biggest attraction of which is a stage that can be rotated through 360°, can seat over 1,800 spectators. During the day, visitors are offered a standard entertainment programme every half hour, and changing large events take place in the evening.

The E-Da amusement park is an amusement park that takes up ancient Greece as a theme. It is divided into the three areas “Acropolis”, “Aegean Village” and “Castle of Troy” and was opened on December 19, 2010. The “Aeropolis” at the entrance is built in the ancient Greek style. Inside, there is an opera house that can accommodate more than 1,800 visitors. The “Santorini” area is designed in the white and blue architectural style of the Aegean Sea and includes various rides and several international restaurants. The “Trojan Castle” is located in the north-eastern part of the park. This area is based on the story of the Trojan horse. In July 2012, the park was expanded to include a new 3D ship swing, which was upgraded to 5D in 2014.

The private educational institutions I-Shou University and the I-Shou International School, which also belong to the E-United Group, border the E-DA world.

== Gallery ==
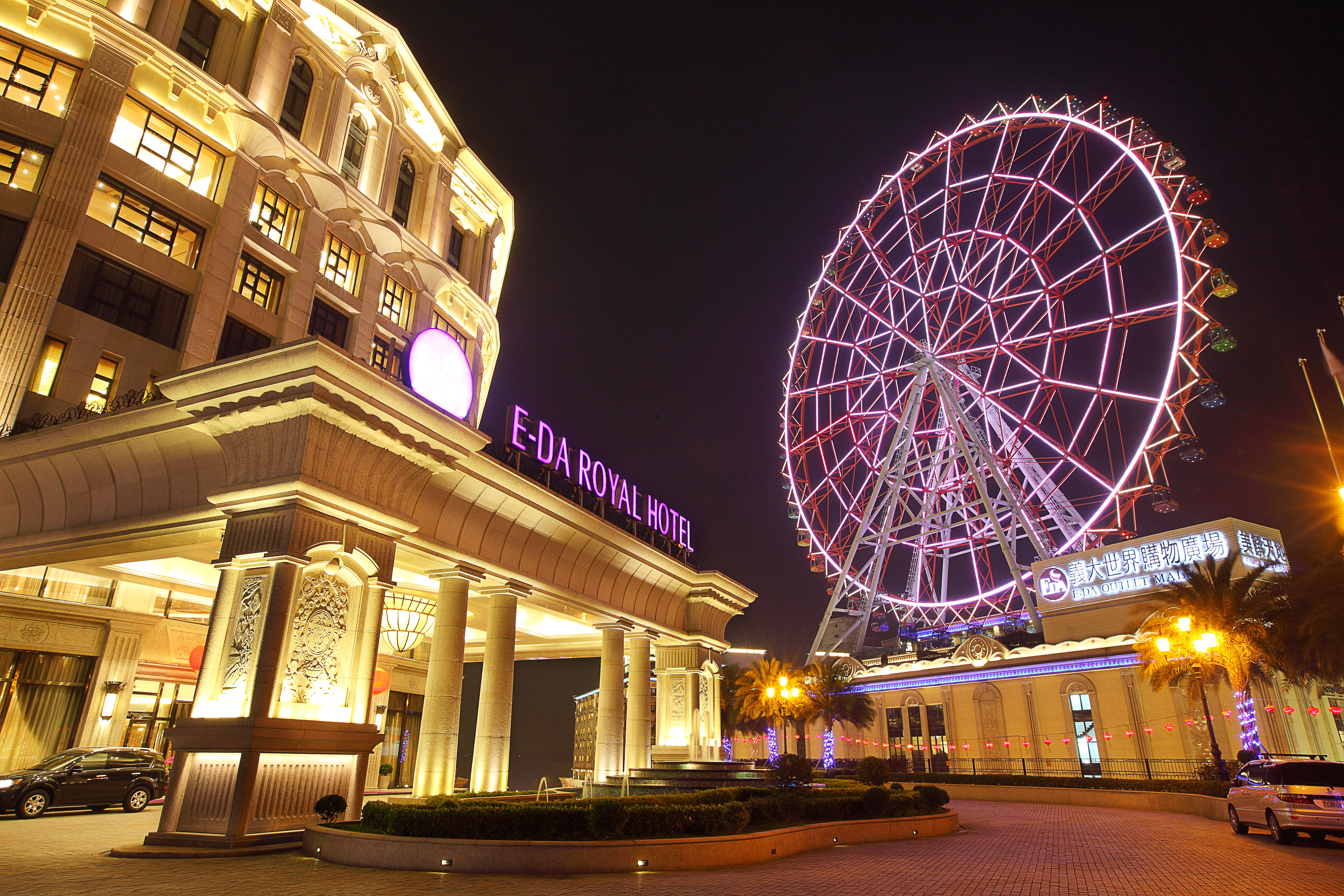
At night

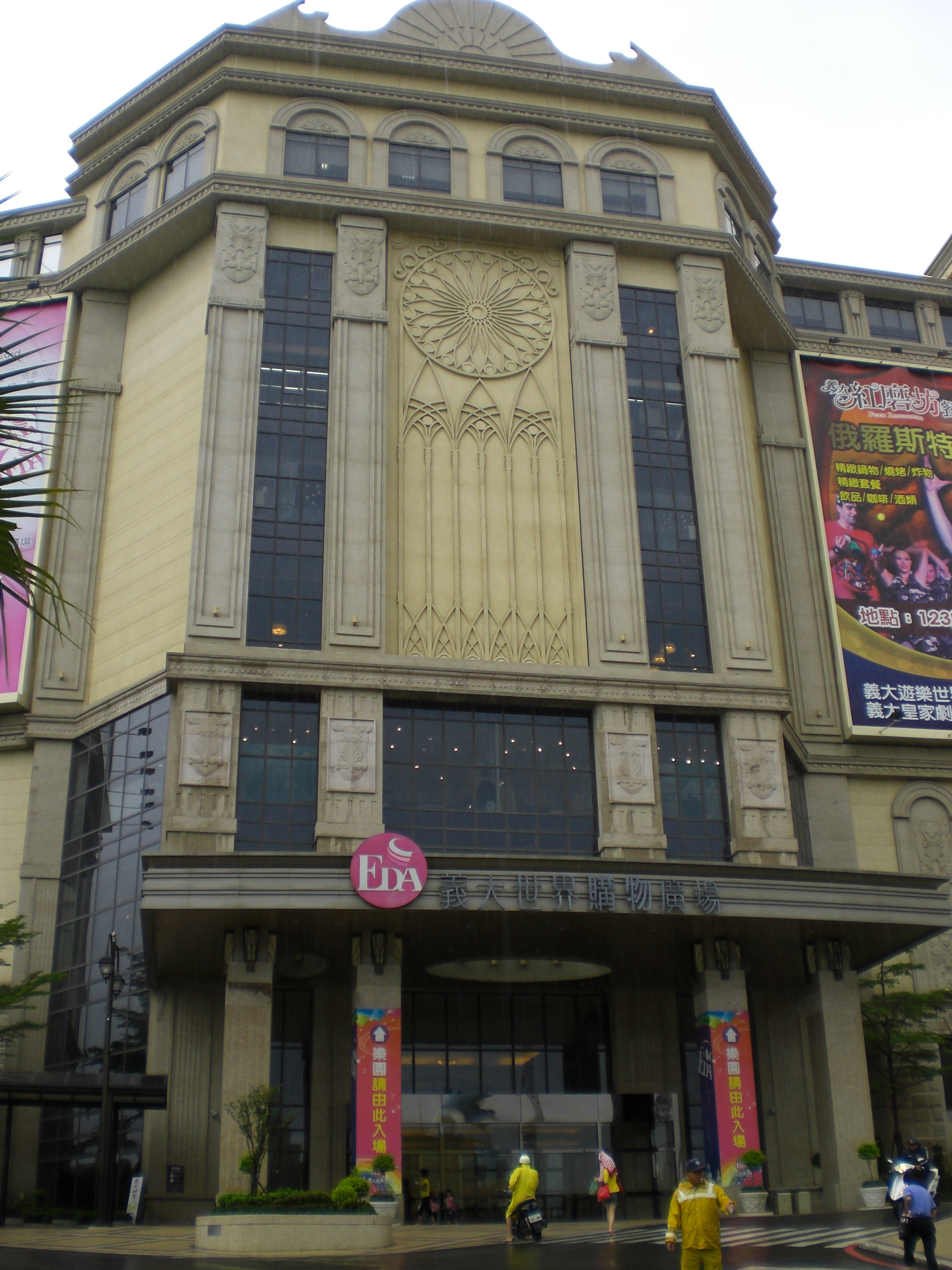
Entrance

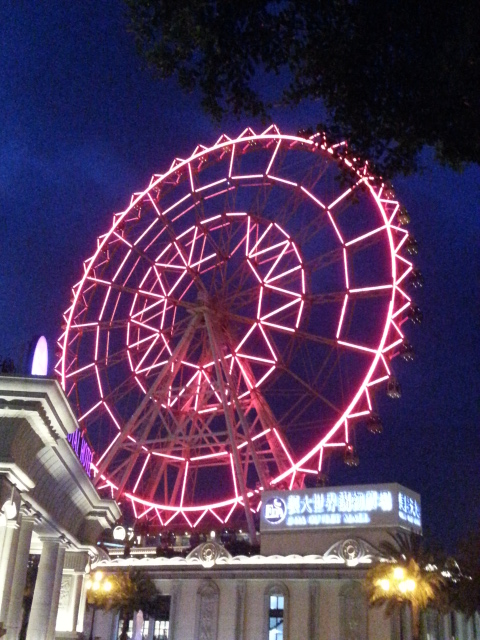
Ferris Wheel

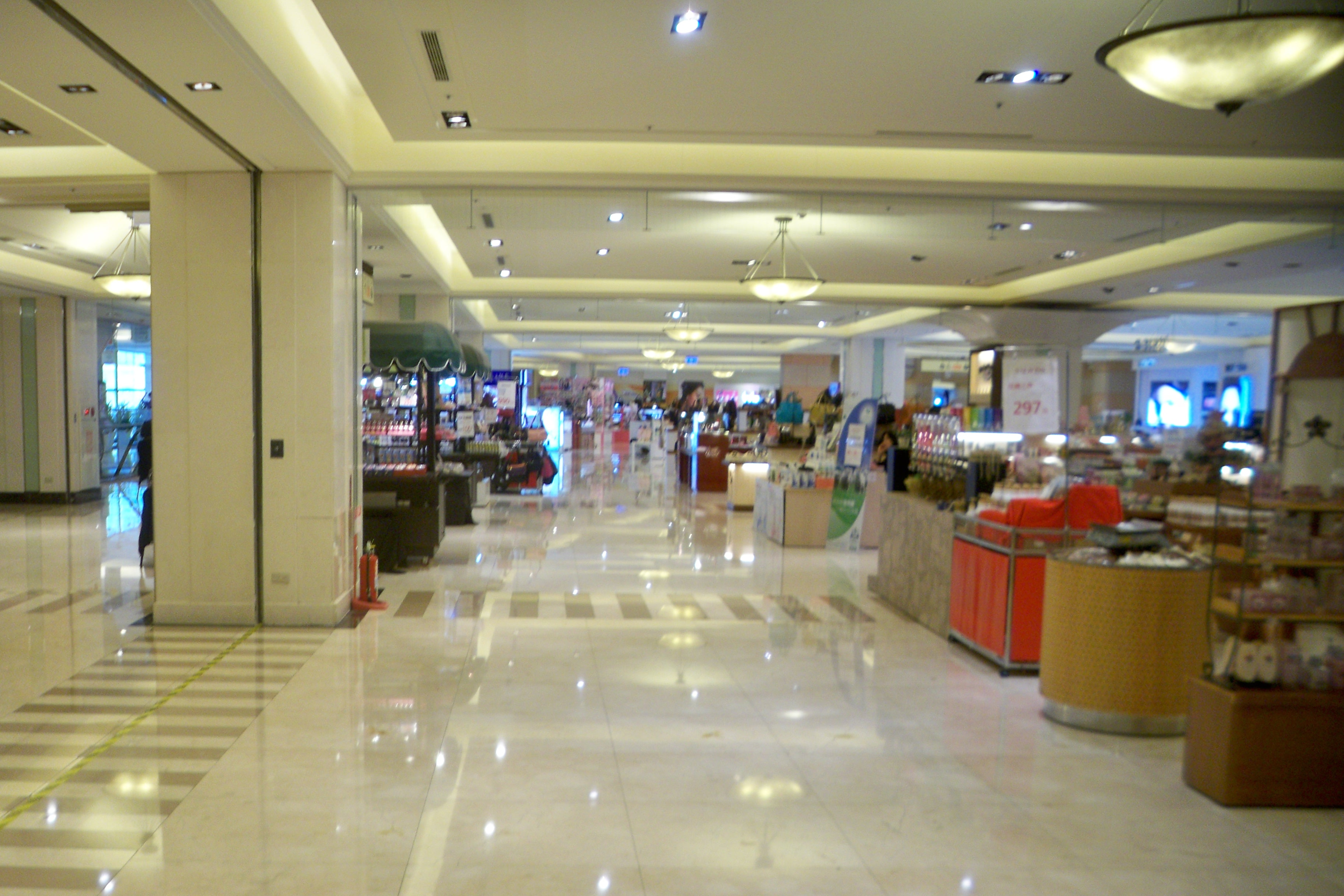
Interior

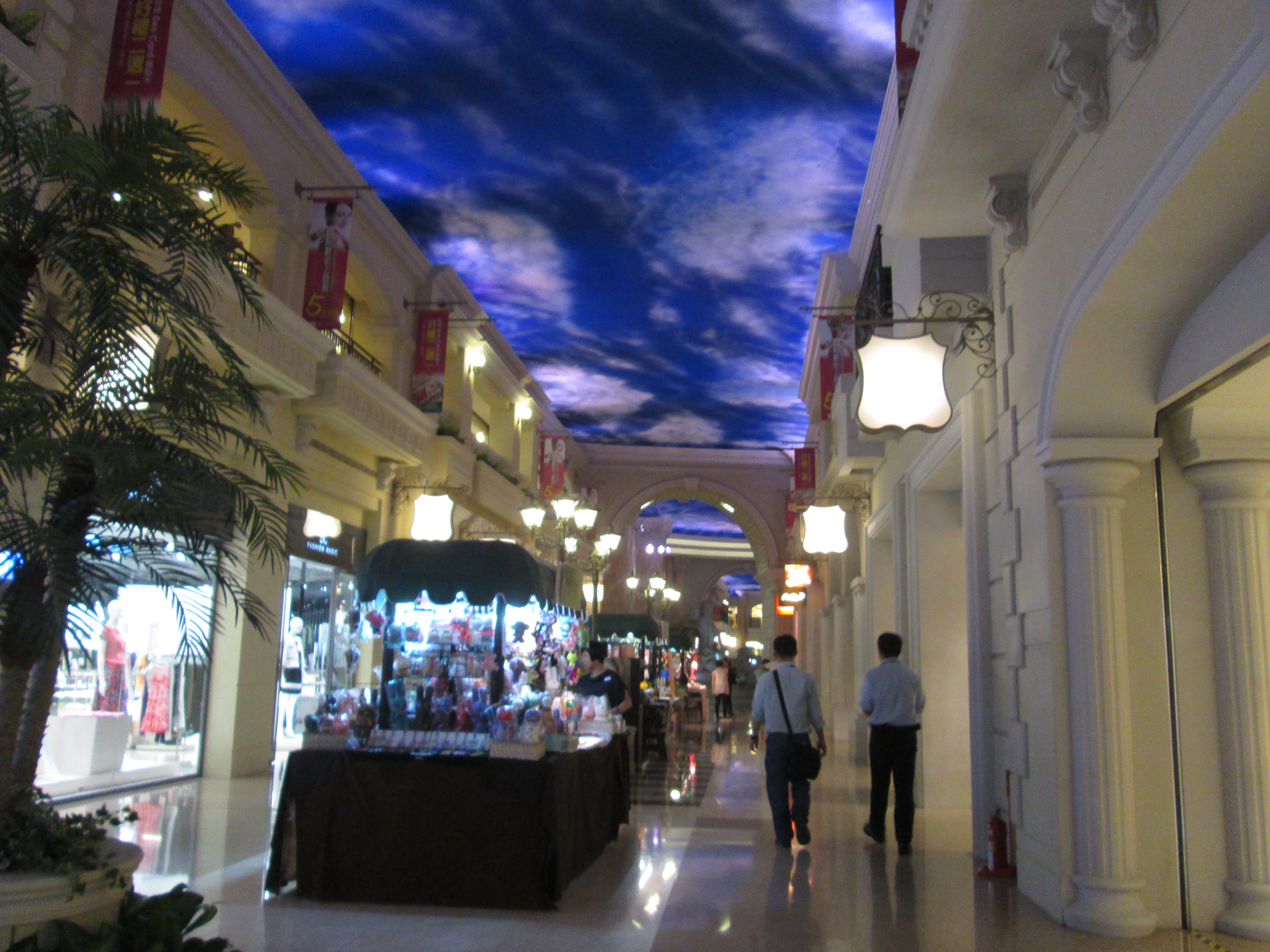
Interior

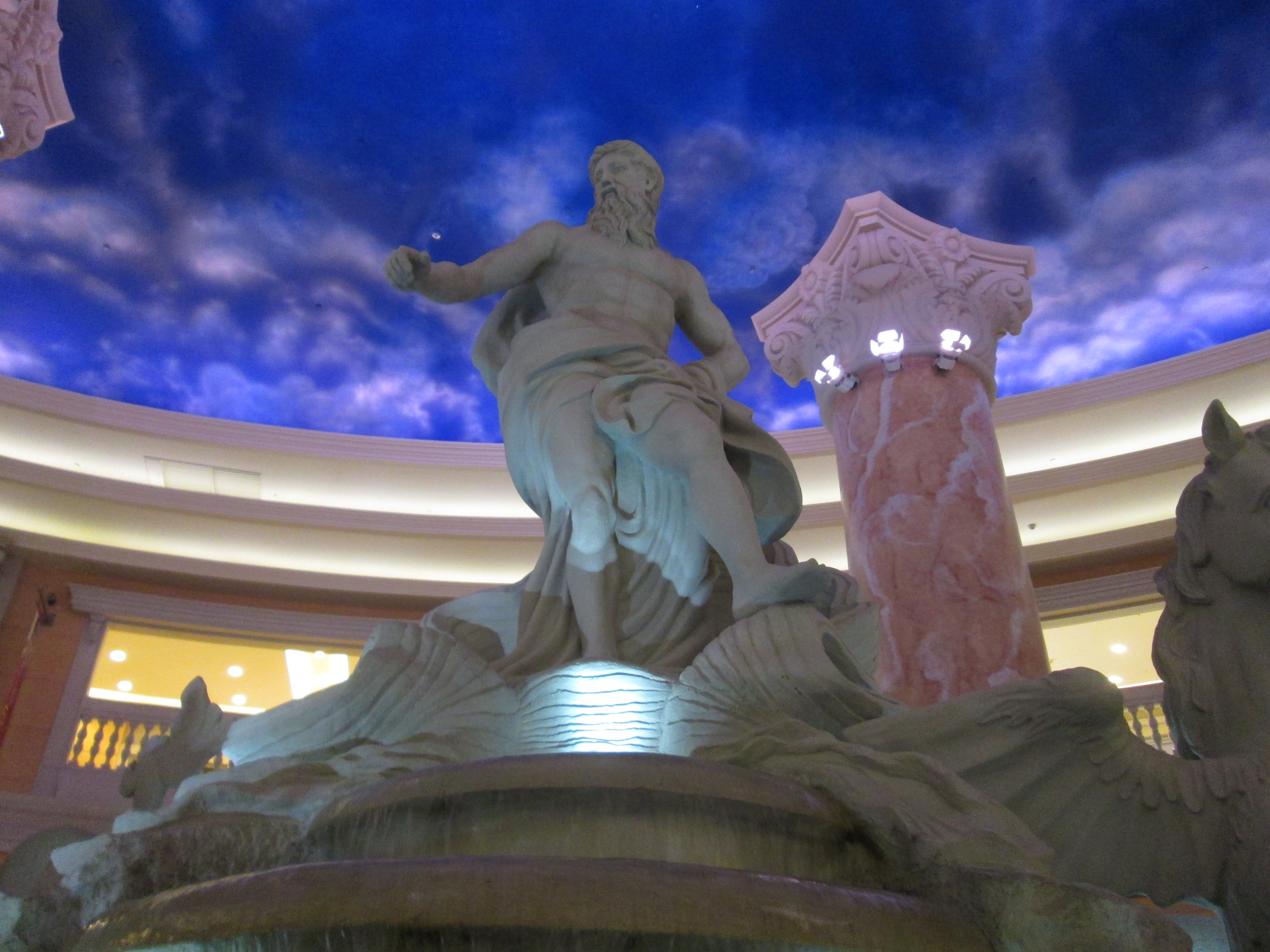
Statue

== See also ==
- List of tourist attractions in Taiwan
- Dream Mall
- Taroko Park
