= Kaisyuan Rueitian light rail station =

Light rail station in Kaohsiung, Taiwan

Coordinates: 22.5994°N 120.3197°E

Kaisyuan Rueitian C2 凱旋瑞田
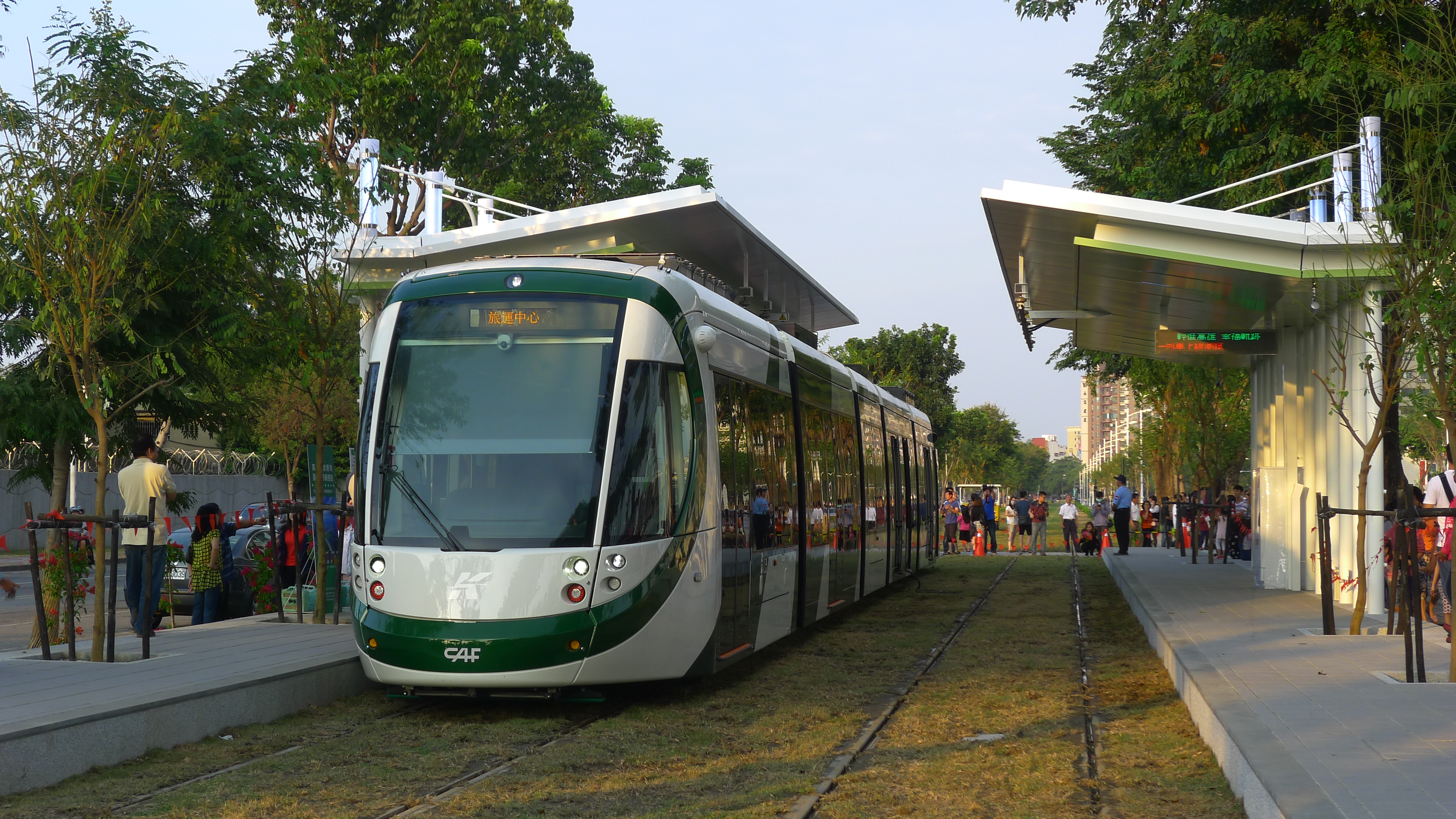

General information
- Location: Cianjhen, Kaohsiung; Taiwan
- Operated by: Kaohsiung Rapid Transit Corporation
- Line: Circular line
- Platforms: 2 side platforms
- Connections: Bus stop

Construction
- Structure type: At-grade
- Accessible: Yes

Other information
- Station code: C2

History
- Opened: October 16, 2015

Services
Preceding station	Kaohsiung Metro	Following station
Lizihnei outer loop / anticlockwise	Circular light rail	Cianjhen Star inner loop / clockwise
Location

Kaisyuan Rueitian station (Chinese: 凱旋瑞田站; Hanyu Pinyin: Kǎixuán Ruìtián Zhàn; Tongyong Pinyin: Kǎisyuán Ruèitián Jhàn) is a light rail station of the Circular light rail of the Kaohsiung Metro. It is located in Cianjhen District, Kaohsiung, Taiwan.

== Station overview ==
This is a street-level station with two side platforms. It is located at the junction of Rueitian Street and Kaisyuan 4th Road, near the Kaisyuan Night Market.

== Station layout ==
Street level	Side platform
Street level	← Circular light rail toward Hamasen (Cianjhen Star)
Street level	→ Circular light rail toward Lizihnei
Street level	Side platform

== Around the station ==
- Kaisyuan Night Market
- Wujia Park
