= Jiangsu Qingjiang Middle School =

School in Jiangsu, China

Jiangsu Qingjiang Middle School (simplified Chinese: 江苏省清江中学; traditional Chinese: 江蘇省清江中學; pinyin: Jiāngsūshěng Qīngjiāng Zhōngxué) or Qingzhong (Chinese: 清中; pinyin: Qīngzhōng) for short is a high school located in Huai'an, Jiangsu, People’s Republic of China. In 2010, the 60th anniversary of Qingjiang Middle School had a wonderful end on National Day. Han Haijian(韩海建) is the present president.

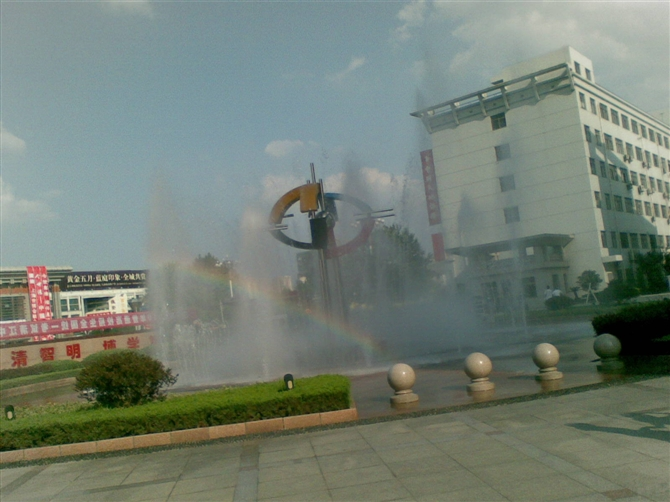
Jiangsu Qingjiang Middle School

== Facility ==
There are multi-purpose rooms for report, the school radio station, the inside gym, and the 800-meter plastic track.

== Education feature ==
Qingjiang Middle School is regarded as the model of using multimedia in education and utilizing information technology education. It held public multimedia lessons for ten years. They pay more attention to the education feature of developing information technology. Along the terms of English education, the school is one of the foreign language schools of national basic education experiments. The school has a high quality of English teachers to ensure the high quality of education. English corner, interesting extracurricular activities, and other activities are also held to improve oral English and the ability to communicate. Pertaining to art and sports education, it can combine the extracurricular knowledge with the knowledge in the classroom. Keeping universal and improving is conducted in the same time. About 100 students learning arts or sports every year are admitted to Rank A Universities. On science education, Jiangsu Qingjiang Middle School is among the schools who have scientific capabilities. Students often take part in subject competitions, inventions, and production.
