= Kaisyuan metro station =

Metro station in Kaohsiung, Taiwan

Kaisyuan R6 凱旋
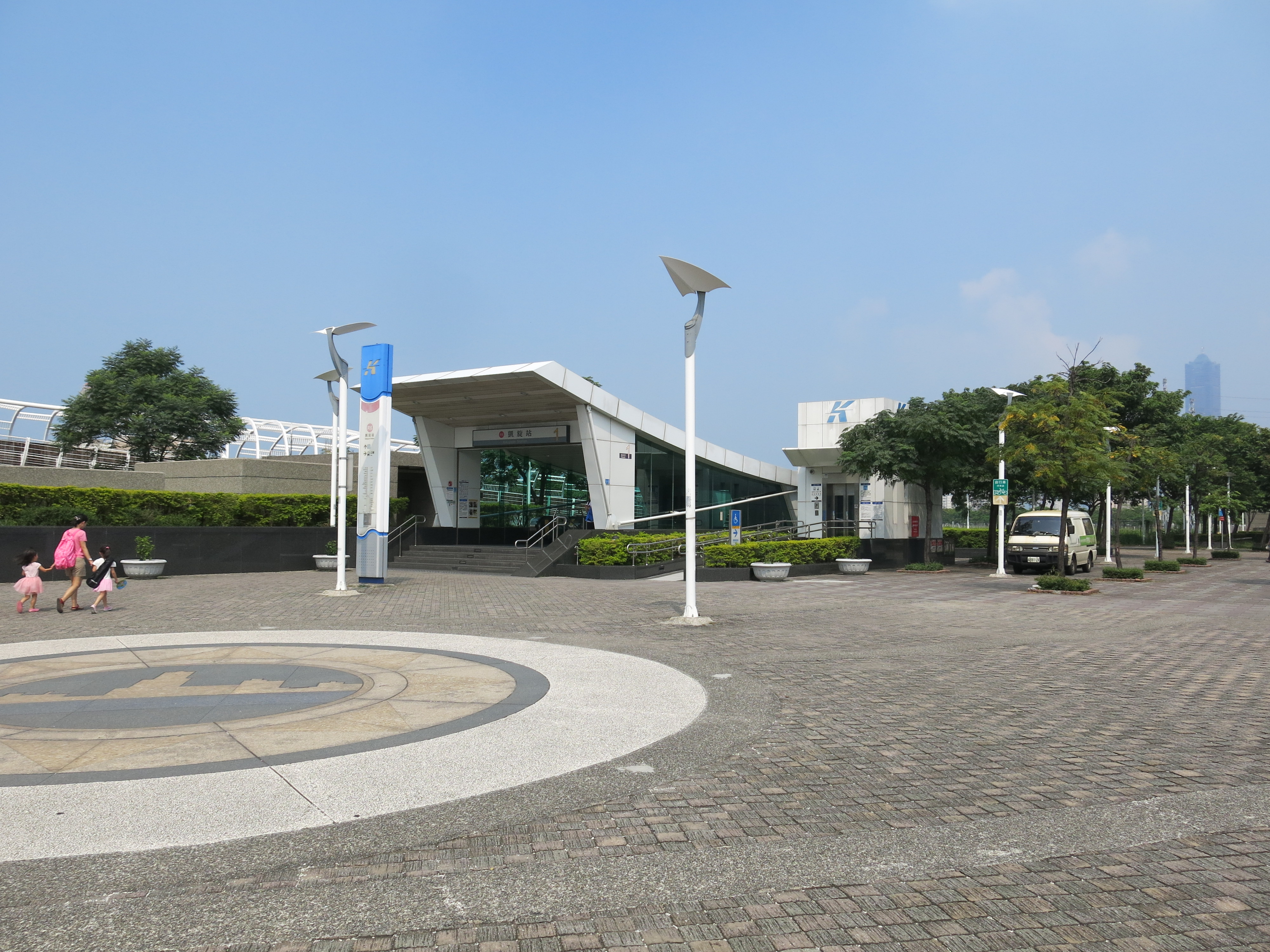
- Kaisyuan station exit 1

Chinese name
- Traditional Chinese: 凱旋站
- Simplified Chinese: 凯旋站
Transcriptions
Standard Mandarin
- Hanyu Pinyin: Kaǐxuán zhàn
- Bopomofo: ㄎㄞˇ ㄒㄩㄢˊ ㄓㄢˋ
- Wade–Giles: Kai^{3}-hsuan^{2} chan^{4}
- Tongyong Pinyin: Kaǐsyuán jhàn

General information
- Location: Cianjhen, Kaohsiung; Taiwan
- Coordinates: 22°35′49″N 120°18′55″E
- Operated by: Kaohsiung Rapid Transit Corporation
- Line(s): Red line (R6)
- Platforms: One island platform

Construction
- Structure type: Underground

History
- Opened: 2008-03-09

Passengers
- 7,173 daily (Jan. 2011)

Services
Preceding station	Kaohsiung Metro	Following station
Shihjia towards Gangshan	Red line	Cianjhen Senior High School towards Siaogang

Kaisyuan is a station on the Red line of Kaohsiung MRT in Cianjhen District, Kaohsiung, Taiwan.

The station is a two-level, underground station with an island platform and three exits. It is 182 metres long and is located at the intersection of Jhongshan 3rd Rd and Kaisyuan 4th Rd.

== Around the station ==
- Circular light rail Cianjhen Star light rail station
- Blue Lagoon Water Park
- Treasure Island Shopping Center
- Kaohsiung World Trade Plaza
- Dream Mall
- Jin-Zuan Night Market
- Kaisyuan Night Market
