= Kaisyuan Night Market =

Night market in Qianzhen, Kaohsiung, Taiwan

Kaisyuan Night Market 凱旋觀光夜市
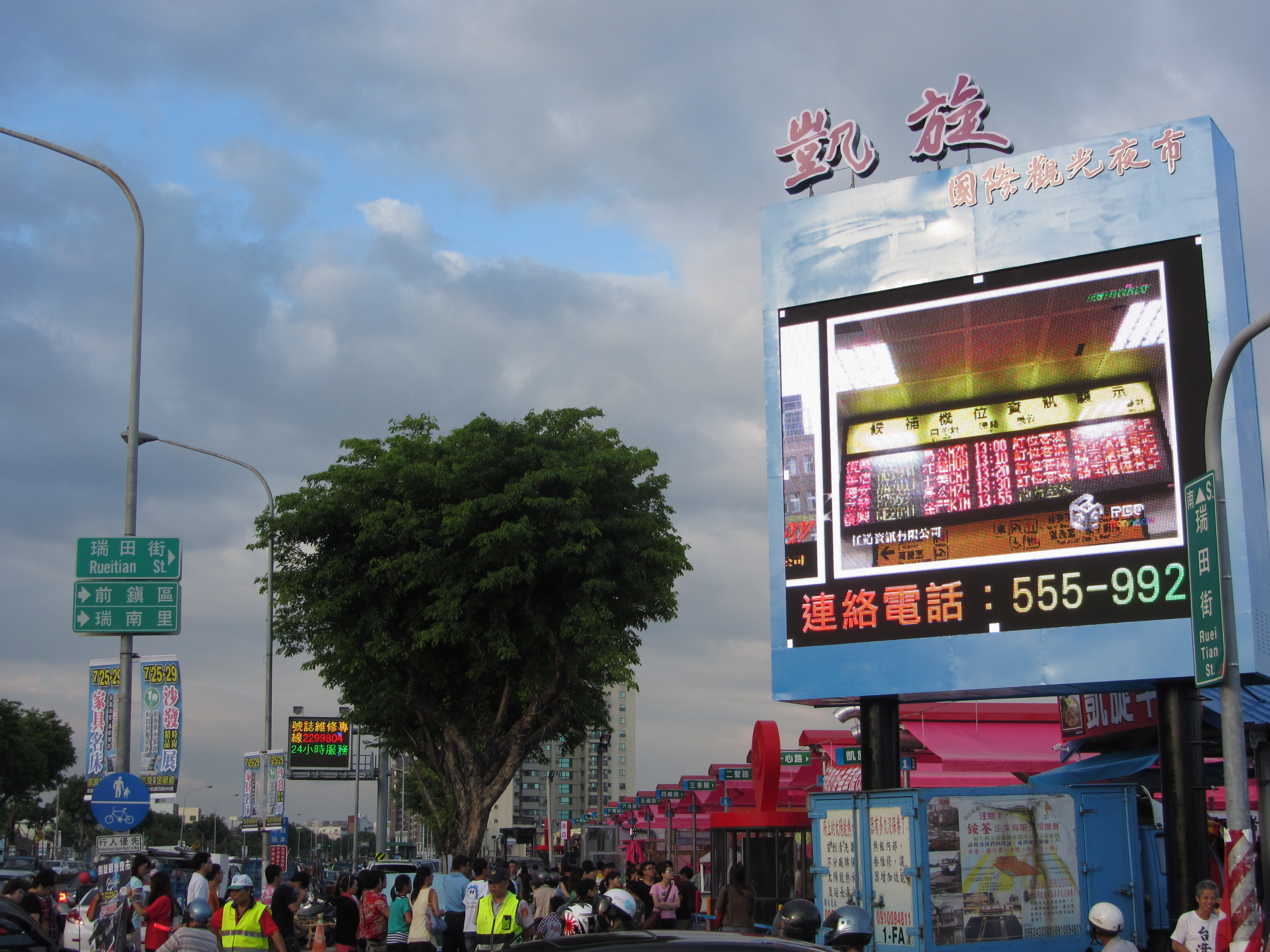
- Location: Cianjhen, Kaohsiung, Taiwan; 22°35′57.0″N 120°19′15.9″E
- Opening date: 29 July 2013
- Environment: night market
- Number of tenants: 1,000 vendors and stalls
- Total retail floor area: 46,000 m^{2}
- Interactive map of Kaisyuan Night Market

The Kaisyuan Night Market (simplified Chinese: 凯旋观光夜市; traditional Chinese: 凱旋觀光夜市; Hanyu Pinyin: Kǎixuán Guānguāng Yèshì; Tongyong Pinyin: Kǎisyuán Guanguang Yèshìh) is a night market in Cianjhen District, Kaohsiung, Taiwan. Together with the adjacent Jin-Zuan Night Market, they form the largest night market in Taiwan.

== History ==
The night market was opened on 29 July 2013.

== Architecture ==
The night market covers an area of 46,000 m^{2} and consists of around 1,000 vendors and stalls.

== Features ==
The market contains stalls selling items such as food, beer, clothes, and souvenirs. There are many places for children to play, such as playgrounds and swings.

== Transportation ==
The night market is accessible by the free shuttle bus or by walking about 600 meters (200 feet) northeast from Exit 2 of the Kaisyuan Station of Kaohsiung MRT. The market is located directly across the road from the Kaisyuan Rueitian light rail station.

== Opening Hours ==
The night market is open from 5PM until midnight, from Thursday to Sunday.

== See also ==
- List of night markets in Taiwan
