= Cianjhen Star light rail station =

Light rail station in Kaohsiung, Taiwan

Coordinates: 22.595503°N 120.315365°E

Cianjhen Star C3 前鎮之星
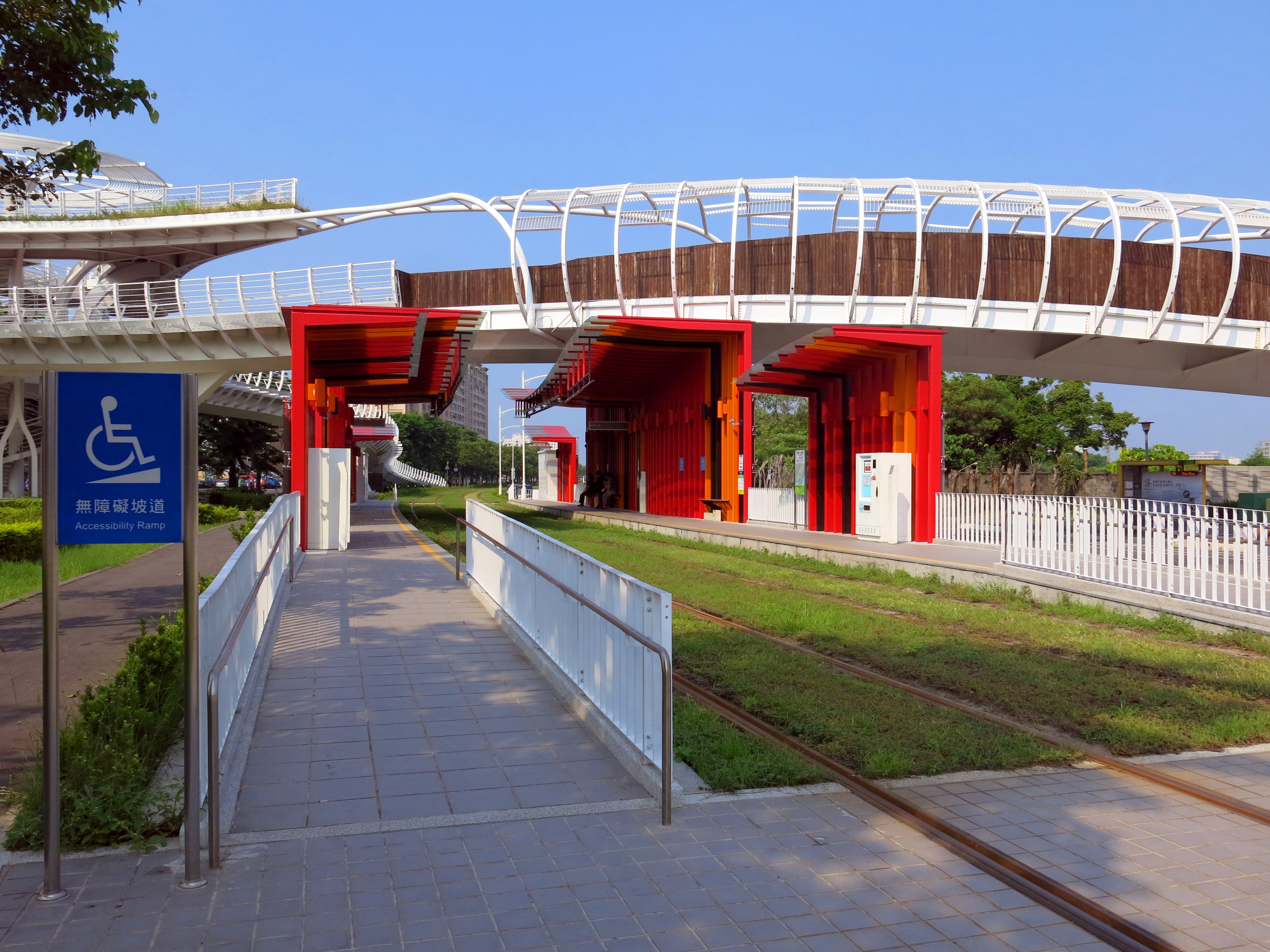

General information
- Other names: Kaisyuan; 凱旋
- Location: Cianjhen, Kaohsiung; Taiwan
- Operated by: Kaohsiung Rapid Transit Corporation
- Line: Circular line
- Platforms: 2 side platforms
- Connections: Bus stop

Construction
- Structure type: At-grade
- Accessible: Yes

Other information
- Station code: C3

History
- Opened: August 2015

Services
Preceding station	Kaohsiung Metro	Following station
Kaisyuan Rueitian outer loop / anticlockwise	Circular light rail	Kaisyuan Jhonghua inner loop / clockwise
Location

Cianjhen Star station (Chinese: 前鎮之星站) is a light rail station of the Circular light rail of the Kaohsiung Metro. It is located in Cianjhen District, Kaohsiung, Taiwan.

== Station overview ==
The name of this station is derived from the adjacent landmark Cianjhen Star Bike Bridge. It is a transfer station to the nearby Kaisyuan metro station (凱旋站) of the Red line, of which the nearest entrance is accessible after crossing Kaisyuan 4th Rd.

== Station design ==
This is a street-level station with two side platforms. It is located at the junction of Jhongshan 3rd Road and Kaisyuan 4th Road.

=== Station layout ===
Street level	Side platform
Street level	← Circular light rail toward Hamasen (Kaisyuan Jhonghua)
Street level	→ Circular light rail toward Lizihnei (Kaisyuan Rueitian)
Street level	Side platform

== Around the station ==
- Star-of-Cianjhen Bike Bridge
- Kaisyuan metro station on Red line
- Cianjhen neighborhood
- Jhongkai Bridge (an automobile viaduct along Jhongshan 3rd Rd.)
- Indigenous People's Park
- Ruinan Park
- Armaments Bureau 205th Arsenal
