= Fisheries Agency =

Government agency of the Republic of China

Coordinates: 25.029643°N 121.520908°E

- 農業部漁業署

Agency overview
- Formed: 1 August 1998
- Jurisdiction: Taiwan (ROC)
- Headquarters: Cianjhen, Kaohsiung
- Agency executive: Huang Hong-yen, Director
- Parent agency: Ministry of Agriculture
- Website: Official website

The Fisheries Agency (FA; traditional Chinese: 農業部漁業署; simplified Chinese: 农业部渔业署; pinyin: Nóngyè Bù Yúyèshǔ) is the agency of the Ministry of Agriculture of Taiwan (ROC) responsible for all matters relating to fisheries.

== History ==
In May 1998, the amendment of the Regulation for the Organization of the Council of Agriculture, Executive Yuan and the bill for the Regulation for the Organization of the Fisheries Agency, the Council of Agriculture, Executive Yuan were adopted by the Legislative Yuan and enacted by President Lee Teng-hui on 24 June 1998 for promulgation. The agency was then officially established on 1 August 1998.

On 1 July 1999, the Taiwan Fisheries Bureau of the Department of Agriculture and Forestry of Taiwan Provincial Government was merged with the agency. And also, the Fishery Broadcast Station of the Department of Agriculture and Forestry became an affiliated department of the agency. On 1 August 2000, the Southern Taiwan Office of the agency was established in Kaohsiung. On 29 October 2007, the agency moved its headquarters to Kaohsiung. The Southern Taiwan Office was subsequently renamed to Public Service Center and at the same time, the Northern Taiwan Office was established in Taipei.

== Organizational structure ==
- Planning Division
- Fisheries Regulation Division
- Deep Sea Fisheries Division
- Aquaculture Fisheries Division
- Deep Sea Fishery Research and Development Center
- Personnel Office
- Accounting Office
- Secretariat Office
- Civil Service Ethics Office
- Fishery Radio Station

== List of directors ==
- James Sha (24 June 2008 - 30 December 2014)
- Tsay Tzu-yaw (31 December 2014 -)
- Huang Hong-yen (16 January 2018 -)

== Transportation ==
The agency headquarter office is accessible within walking distance south west from Caoya Station of Kaohsiung MRT, and its Taipei office is accessible within walking distance south east from Chiang Kai-shek Memorial Hall Station of Taipei Metro.

== See also ==
- Council of Agriculture (Taiwan)
