= National Science and Technology Museum =

Museum in Sanmin, Kaohsiung, Taiwan

- 國立科學工藝博物館
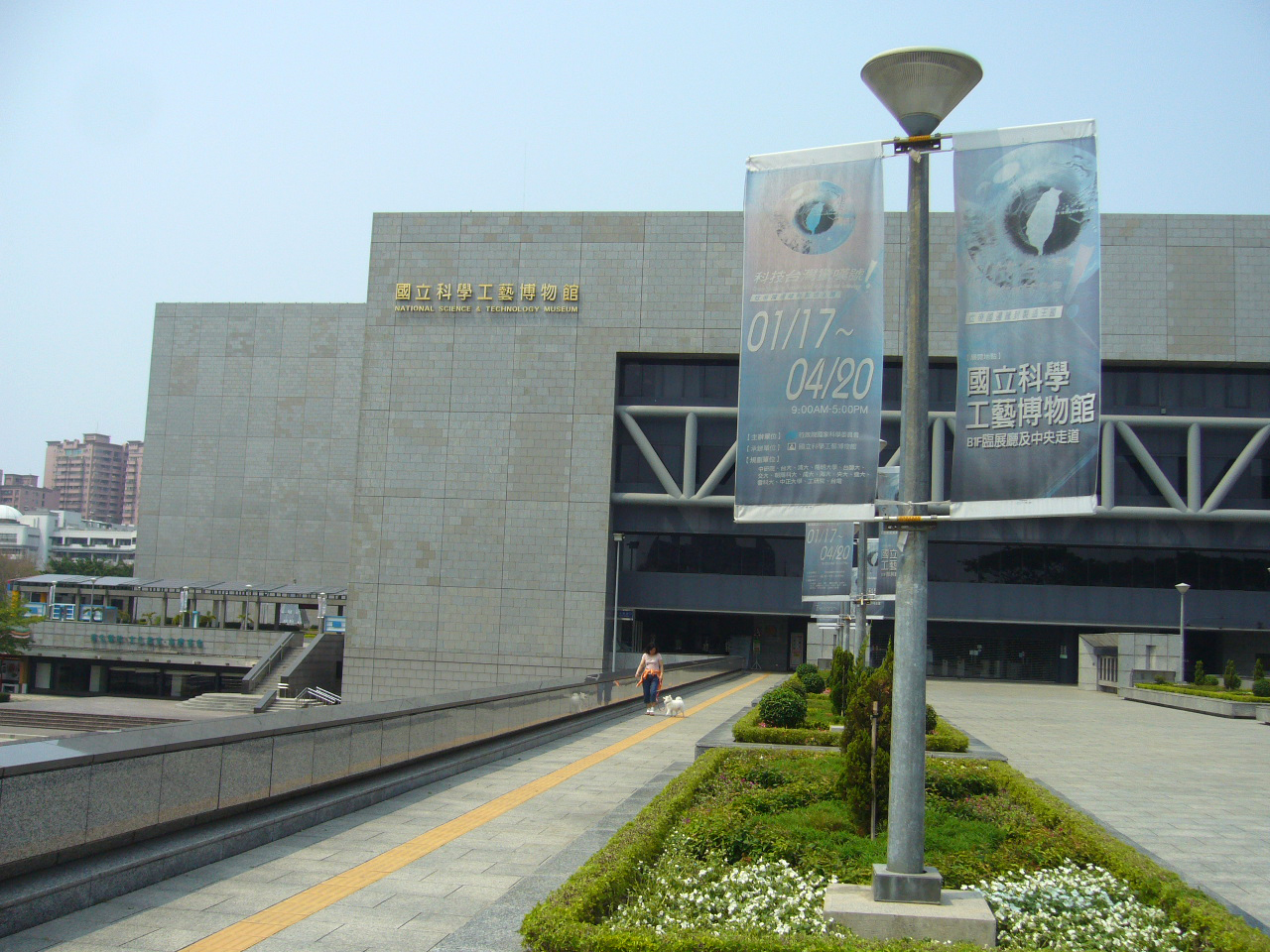
- Museum entrance
- Established: November 1997
- Location: Sanmin, Kaohsiung, Taiwan
- Coordinates: 22°38′28.9″N 120°19′21.6″E
- Type: Science museum
- Visitors: 2,300,000 (2022)
- Website: www.nstm.gov.tw

The National Science and Technology Museum (NSTM; traditional Chinese: 國立科學工藝博物館; simplified Chinese: 国立科学工艺博物馆; pinyin: Guólì Kēxué Gōngyì Bówùguǎn) is a museum of applied science and technology in Sanmin District, Kaohsiung, Taiwan.

== History ==
The museum was established in November 1997.

== Architecture ==
The museum covers an area of 19 hectares on Chiuju Road in Sanmin District. The floor area covers 112,400 square meters and as a result claims to be the largest science museum in Asia. The architecture features geometric forms including triangles, rectangles, and circles, and the buildings are connected by straight bridges.

== Transportation ==
The museum accessible via the Science and Technology Museum railway station of Taiwan Railway.

== See also ==
- List of museums in Taiwan
