= Chienchen River =

River in Kaohsiung, Taiwan

Coordinates: 22°35′14.1″N 120°18′30.4″E

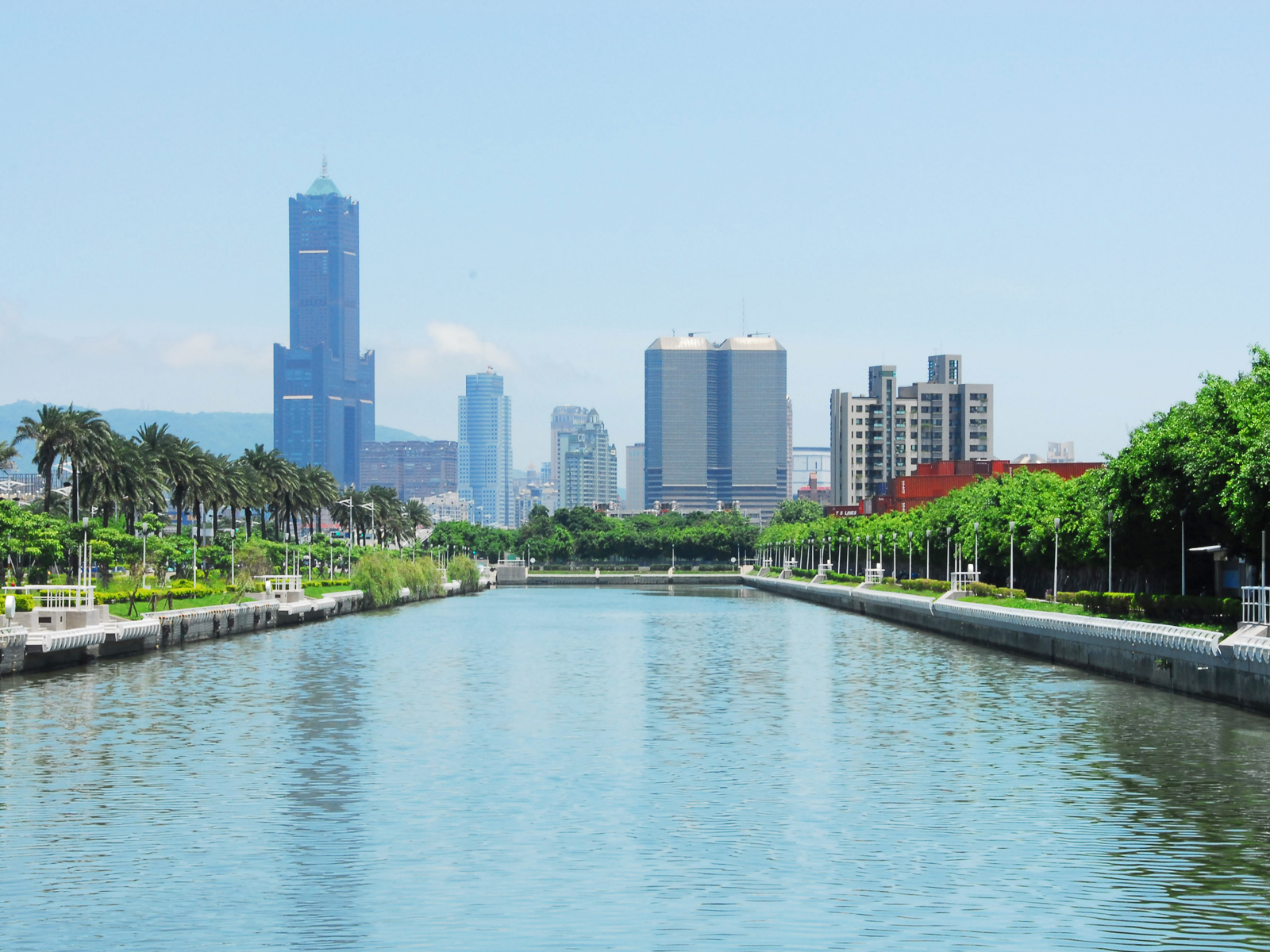
- Native name: 前鎮運河 (Chinese)

Physical characteristics
- Mouth: Taiwan Strait
  - location: Cianjhen District

The Chienchen River (traditional Chinese: 前鎮運河; simplified Chinese: 前镇运河; Hanyu Pinyin: Qiánzhèn Yùnhé; Tongyong Pinyin: Ciánjhèn Yùnhé; Wade–Giles: Chʻien²-chên⁴ Yün⁴-ho²) is a river in Kaohsiung, Taiwan.

== History ==
The river used to be very dirty what it was once called the Black Dragon River (Chinese: 黑龍江). In 2004, Kaohsiung Mayor Frank Hsieh took the initiative to clean the river for four years with a budget of NT$2 billion. In August 2009, Typhoon Morakot caused flooding in areas adjacent to the river.

== Transportation ==
Part of the river is accessible from Cianjhen Senior High School Station of Kaohsiung MRT.

== See also ==
- List of rivers of Taiwan
