= Science and Technology Museum railway station =

Railway station in Sanmin, Kaohsiung, Taiwan

Science and Technology Museum 科工館
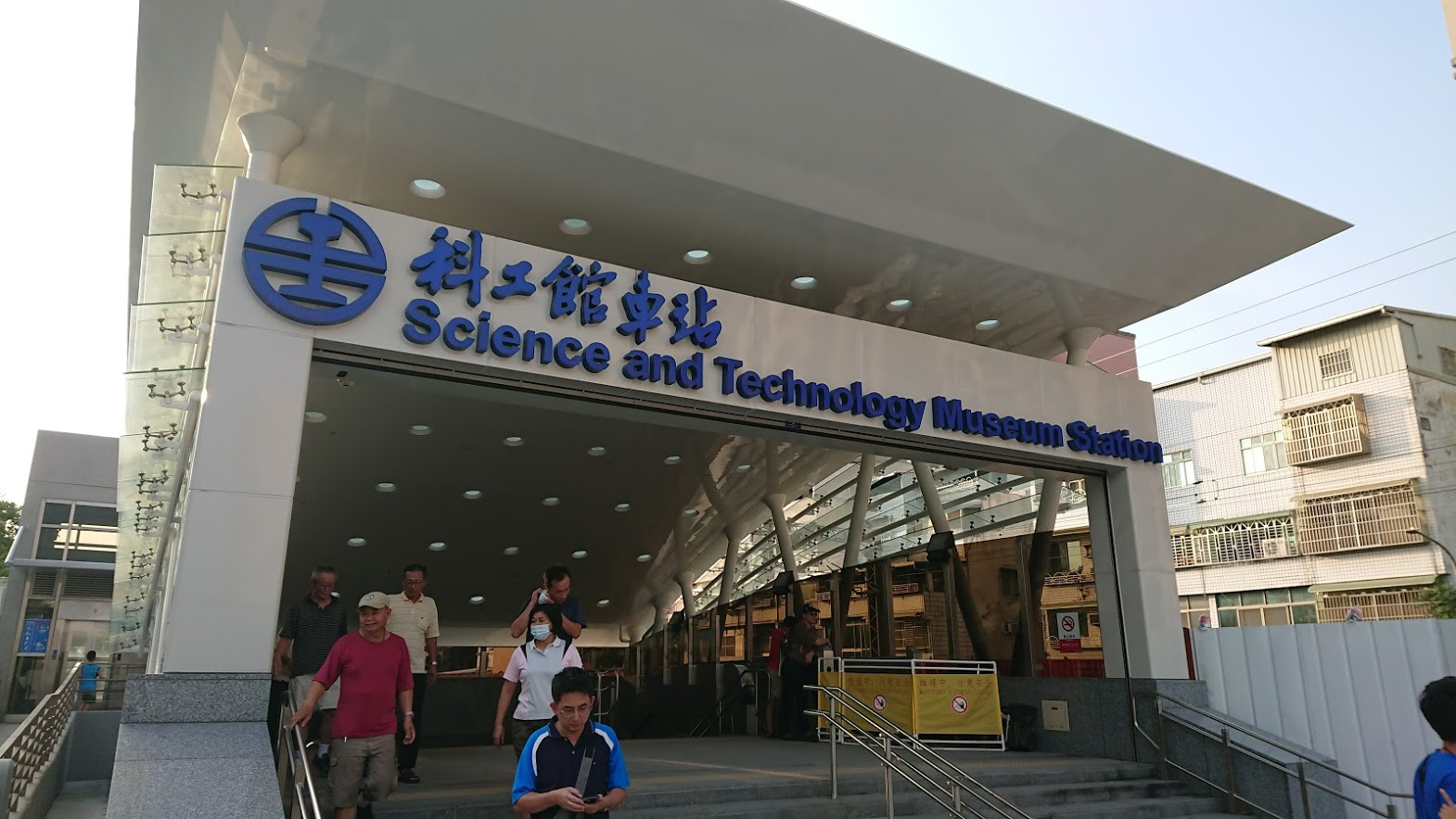

Chinese name
- Traditional Chinese: 科工館
Transcriptions
Standard Mandarin
- Hanyu Pinyin: Kēgōngguǎn
- Bopomofo: ㄎㄜ ㄍㄨㄥ ㄍㄨㄢˇ

General information
- Location: Sanmin, Kaohsiung; Taiwan
- Coordinates: 22°38′13.4″N 120°19′34.6″E
- System: Taiwan Railway railway station
- Line: Pingtung line
- Distance: 2.4 km to Kaohsiung
- Platforms: 2 side platforms
- Connections: Circular light rail

Construction
- Structure type: Underground

Other information
- Station code: 338

History
- Opened: 14 October 2018; 7 years ago

Services
Preceding station	Taiwan Railway	Following station
Minzu towards Kaohsiung	Western Trunk line (Pingtung)	Zhengyi towards Fangliao
Location

Science and Technology Museum 科工館站
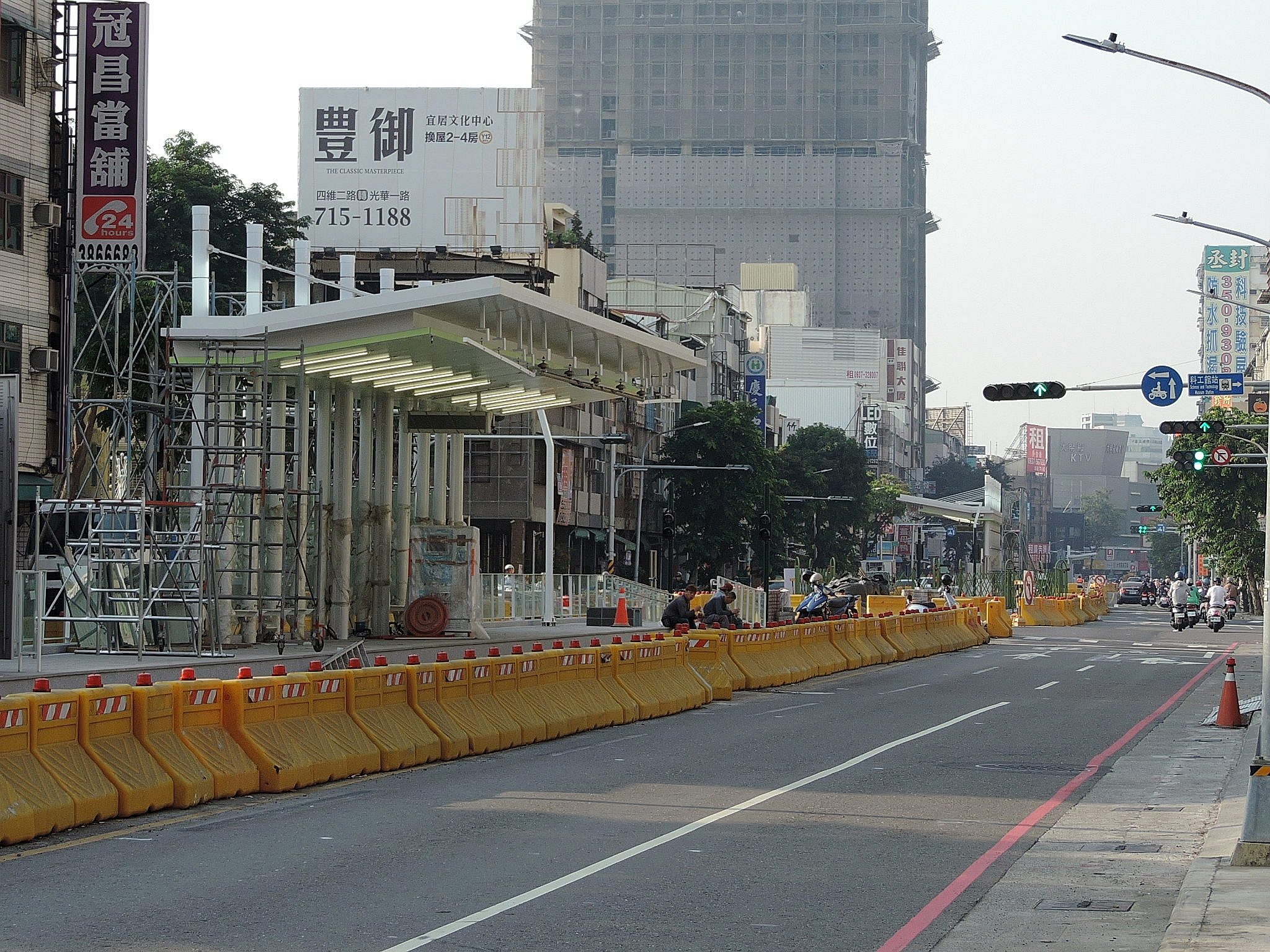

General information
- Location: Sanmin, Kaohsiung; Taiwan
- System: Kaohsiung metro station
- Operator: Kaohsiung Rapid Transit Corporation
- Line: Circular Line
- Platforms: 2 side platforms
- Tracks: 2

Construction
- Structure type: At-grade

Other information
- Station code: C30

History
- Opened: January 1, 2024

Services
Preceding station	Kaohsiung Metro	Following station
Shu-Te Home-Economics & Commercial High School outer loop / anticlockwise	Circular light rail	St. Joseph Hospital inner loop / clockwise
Location

Science and Technology Museum railway station (Chinese: 科工館車站; pinyin: Kēgōngguǎn Chēzhàn) is a railway and light rail station located in Sanmin District, Kaohsiung, Taiwan. It is served by Taiwan Railway and the Circular light rail line of the Kaohsiung Metro. It is located on the Pingtung line and is served by all local trains.

The station is located next to the National Science and Technology Museum, which is where the station gets its name.
