= Caoya, Kaohsiung =

Village in Qianzhen, Kaohsiung, Taiwan

Coordinates: 22°34′N 120°20′E

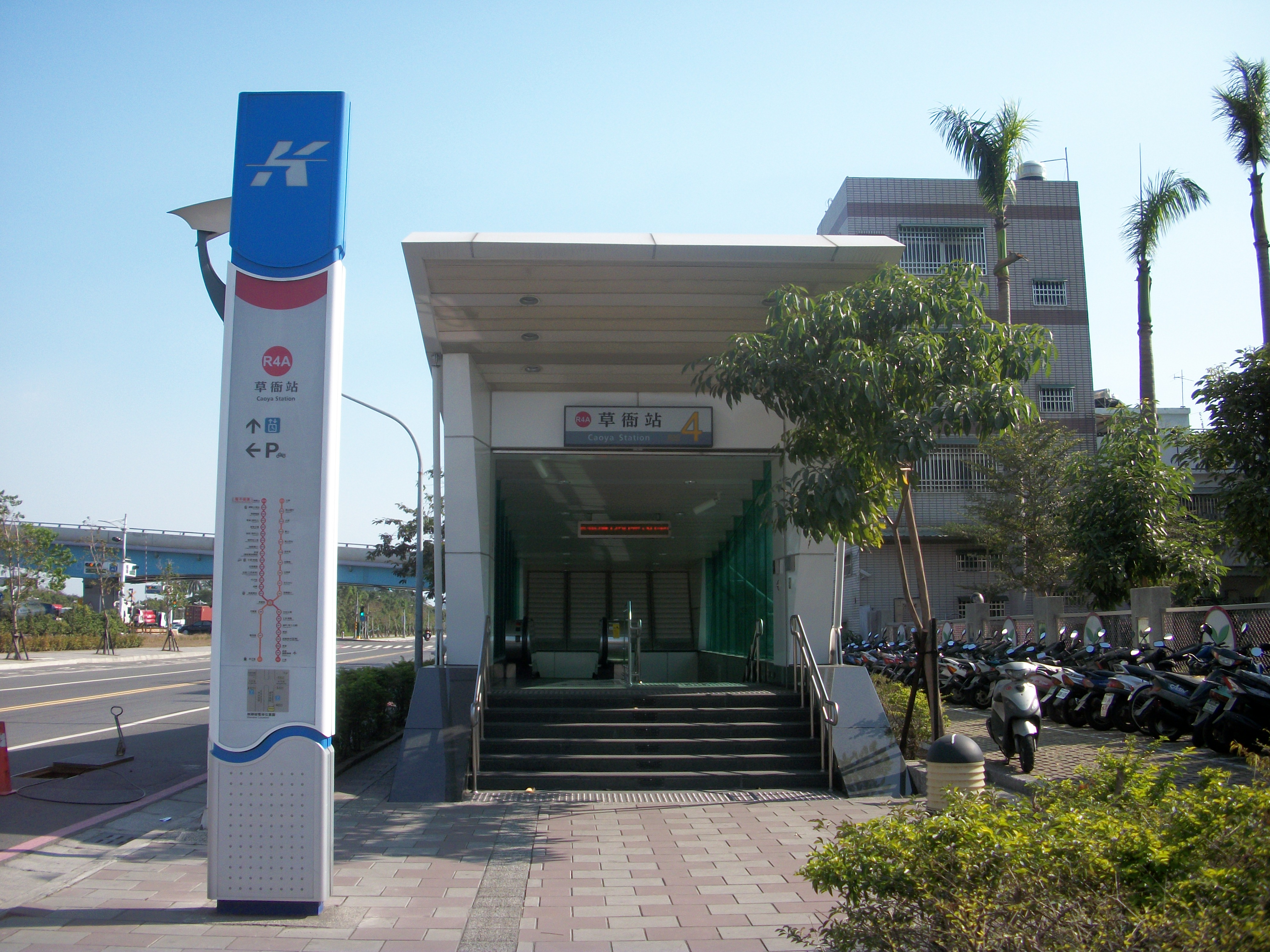
Caoya

Caoya (Chinese: 草衙) is a village in the southern of Cianjhen District, Kaohsiung, Taiwan. The name "Caoya", which originally means a draft government building of Zheng Chenggong in Ming dynasty, now consists of more than 12,000 people. Caoya is also the nearest town to one of the largest fish-market (Qianzhen Fishing Port).
