= Caoya metro station =

Metro station in Kaohsiung, Taiwan

Caoya R4A 草衙
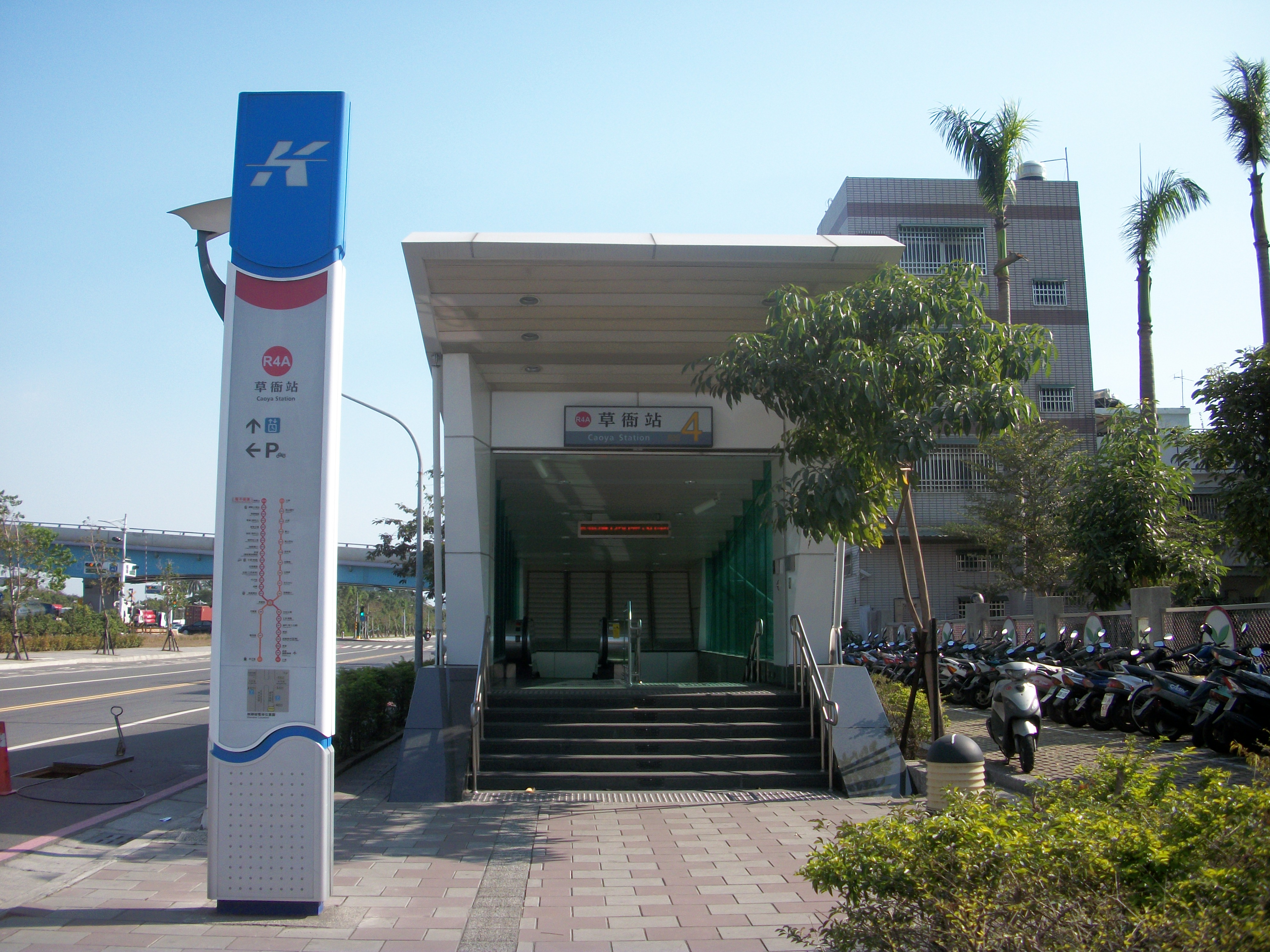
- Caoya station exit 4

Chinese name
- Traditional Chinese: 草衙車站
- Simplified Chinese: 草衙车站
Transcriptions
Standard Mandarin
- Hanyu Pinyin: Cǎoyá Chēzhàn
- Bopomofo: ㄘㄠˇ ㄧㄚˊ ㄔㄜ ㄓㄢˋ
- Wade–Giles: Ts'ao^{3}-ya^{2} Ch'ê^{1}-chan^{4}
- Tongyong Pinyin: Cǎoyá Chejhàn

General information
- Location: Cianjhen, Kaohsiung; Taiwan
- Coordinates: 22°34′49″N 120°19′44″E
- Operated by: Kaohsiung Rapid Transit Corporation
- Line(s): Red line (R4A)
- Platforms: One island platform

Construction
- Structure type: Underground

History
- Opened: 2008-03-09

Passengers
- 4,508 daily (Jan. 2011)

Services
Preceding station	Kaohsiung Metro	Following station
Cianjhen Senior High School towards Gangshan	Red line	Kaohsiung International Airport towards Siaogang

Caoya is a station on the Red line of Kaohsiung MRT in Cianjhen District, Kaohsiung, Taiwan.

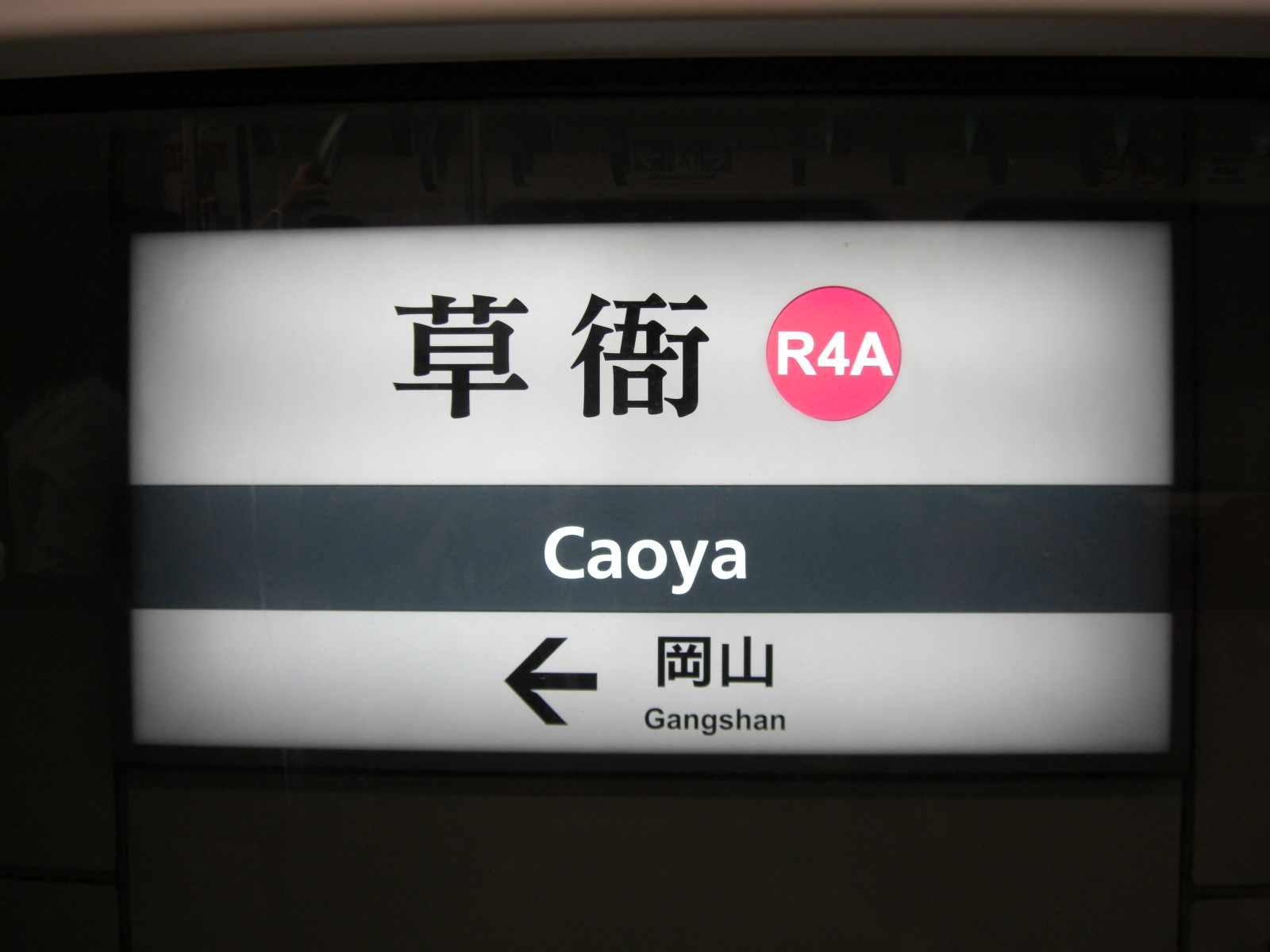
Kaohsiung MRT Caoya station

The station is a two-level, underground station with an island platform and four exits. It is 210 metres long and is located at the intersection of Cueiheng South Rd. and Jhong-an Rd.

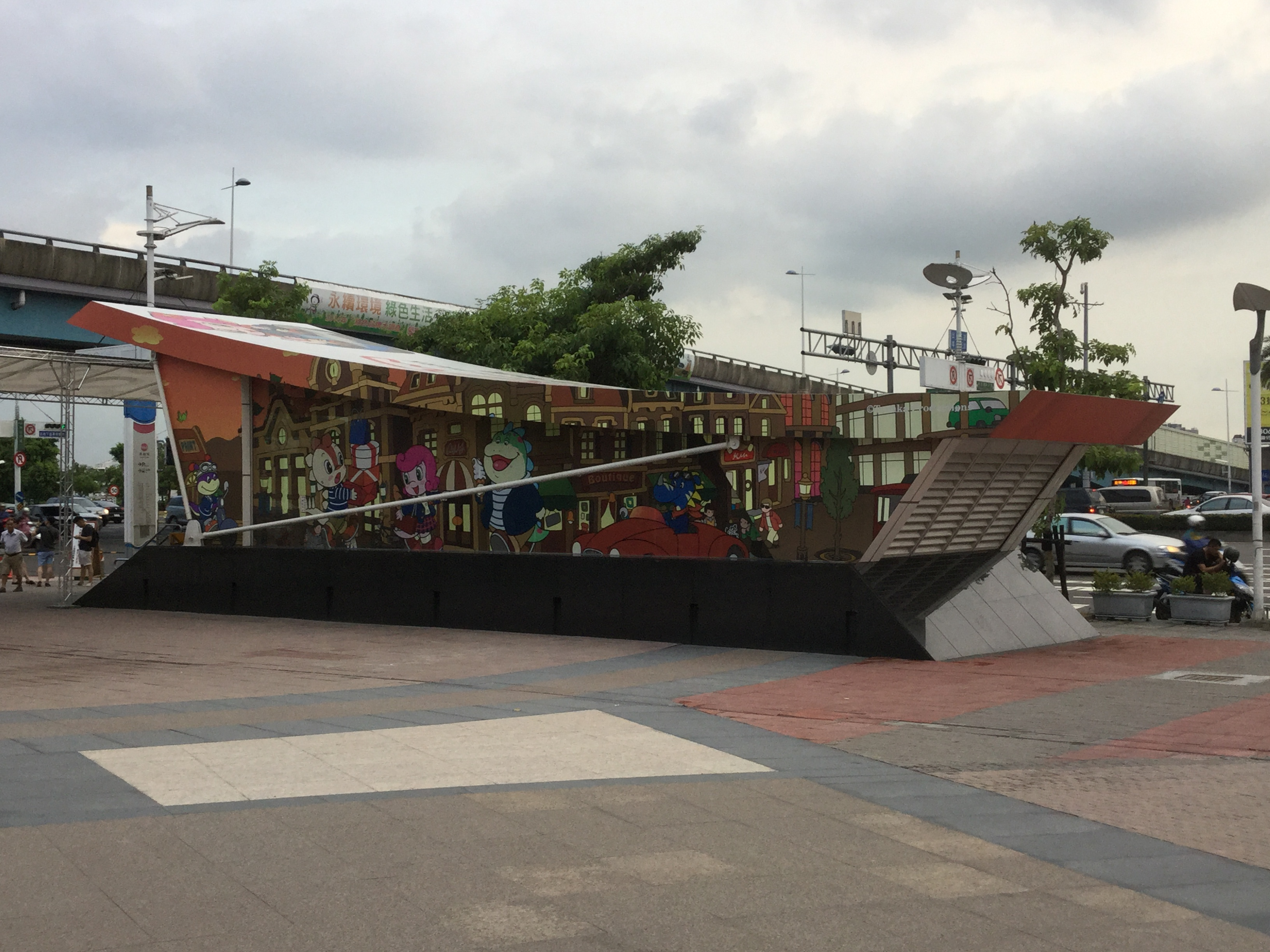
Exit 2

== Around the station ==
- Fisheries Agency
- Kaohsiung Museum of Fisheries Civilization
- SKM Park
- Fogong old village in Cianjhen
- Caoya Depot, Kaohsiung Metro
