= Cianjhen Senior High School metro station =

Metro station in Kaohsiung, Taiwan

Cianjhen Senior High School R5/Y23 前鎮高中
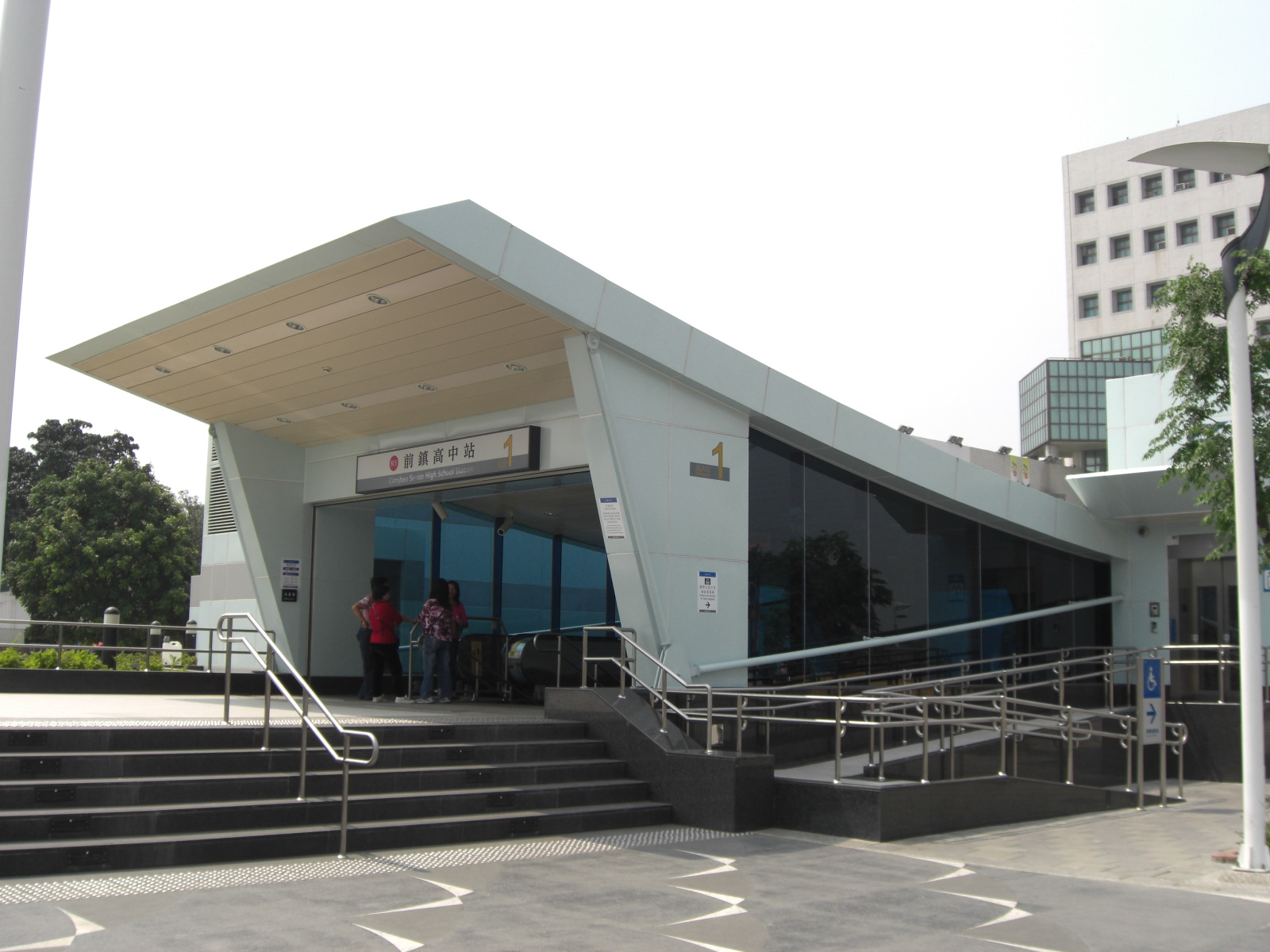
- Cianjhen Senior High School station exit 1

Chinese name
- Traditional Chinese: 前鎮高中車站
- Simplified Chinese: 前镇高中车站
Transcriptions
Standard Mandarin
- Hanyu Pinyin: Qiánzhèn Gāozhōng Chēzhàn
- Bopomofo: ㄑㄧㄢˊ ㄓㄣˋ ㄍㄠ ㄓㄨㄥ ㄔㄜ ㄓㄢˋ
- Wade–Giles: Ch'ien^{2}-chen^{4} Kao^{1}-chung^{1} Ch'ê^{1}-chan^{4}
- Tongyong Pinyin: Ciánjhèn Gaojhong Chejhàn

General information
- Other names: Wujia; 五甲
- Location: Cianjhen, Kaohsiung; Taiwan
- Coordinates: 22°35′19″N 120°19′15″E
- Operator: Kaohsiung Rapid Transit Corporation
- Line: Red line (R5); Yellow line (under construction)
- Platforms: One island platform

Construction
- Structure type: Underground

History
- Opened: 2008-03-09

Passengers
- 6,608 daily (Jan. 2011)

Services
Preceding station	Kaohsiung Metro	Following station
Kaisyuan towards Gangshan	Red line	Caoya towards Siaogang
Under construction
Terminus	Yellow line	Longcheng Temple towards Dipu
Location

Cianjhen Senior High School is a station on the Red line of Kaohsiung MRT in Cianjhen District, Kaohsiung, Taiwan. In the future, it will be a transfer station with the Yellow line.

This is a two-level, underground station with an island platform and three exits. It is 199 meters long and is located at the intersection of Jhongshan 4th Rd., Wujia 3rd Rd. and Jhenjhong Rd.

== Around the station ==
- Chienchen River
- Cianjhen Senior High School
- Kaohsiung City Government Labor Affairs Bureau
- Cianjhen District Administrative Center
- Fucheng Senior High School
