= Vladislav Kirpichev =

Russian architect

- Владислав Иванович Кирпичёв
- Born: 4 September 1948; Kashtak, Chelyabinsk Oblast
- Education: Moscow Architectural Institute
- Occupation: Architect
- Awards: State Prize of the Russian Federation
- Website: edas-kirpichev.com

Vladislav Ivanovich Kirpichev (Russian: Владислав Иванович Кирпичёв; born 4 September 1948) is an architect, co-founder of EDAS - Experimental Children Architectural Studio, and professor of architecture. He has taught at FH Frankfurt/Main, Bartlett School of Architecture (UCL) and Greenwich University School of Architecture in London. He was a guest professor at Staedelschule Frankfurt, Centre for Arts and Technology (ZKM) in Karlsruhe, and Aarhus School of Architecture, in Vienna.

He is a laureate of the UNESCO prize and the State Prize of the Russian Federation.

== Biography ==
Vladislav Kirpichev was born September 4, 1948, in the family of a retired military pilot, a teacher of mathematics, military and physical training in a rural school in the small village Kashtak, Chelyabinsk region.

After school, Kirpichev tried to do the aerospace faculty (faculty of space technology "Motors, appliances and machines") in South-Ural State University, but did not get the right number of points and left for another specialty. Later, he decided to enter the Institute of Architecture in Moscow.

In 1969, he became a student at the Moscow Architectural Institute. In parallel, he became interested in classical ballet, choreography studio engaged in the Bolshoi Theater, and even at some point going to enter the GITIS (National Institute of Dramatic Art). In the third year Kirpichev met his future mentor Lezhava Ilya, who was recruiting a talented group of third-year students for the next year. Then Kirpichev took a sabbatical and spent several months in Moscow libraries, where he studied the monograph, architectural journals, so he entered the desired course.

In 1972, when he was in the group Lezhava, won the competition of the International Union of Architects in Paris and received a UNESCO award.

In 1975, after graduation the Moscow Architectural Institute, a young architect distribution ranked Mosproekt 1 and until 1977 was in the public service, where was an atmosphere of conservatism and denial of the "complex architecture". Two years later he left Mosproject and created his own studio, joining a group of like-minded to practice "informal architecture".

In 1978, the studio was called EDAS - Experimental Children Architectural Studio (children themselves invented this name). Very quickly the idea was born to bring to designing teenagers. First, in the studio was just five pupils aged 14–15 years, and it was called " First studio ." A year later the number wishing increased. Over the years, the age of visitors to the Studio declined: at first the studio took no children under the age of 5–6 years, now the youngest of students is 2.5 years old. At the time of suspension of activity of the studio in 1997, it was simultaneously engaged in 120 children. By this time the Studio EDAS was well known in the world, and the name of Vladislav Kirpichev - very authoritative.

1984 - applied for a Rolan Bykov’s course at the Higher Courses for Scriptwriters and directors.

1993 - Vladislav Kirpichev was at first time invited as a guest professor for architectural faculty at FH Frankfurt / Main (Technical University). From then until 2004, he taught and conducted groups at universities in Germany, Denmark, England and Austria, starting from the preparatory departments and finishing graduate school and postgraduate. In the same year Kirpichev was awarded a State Prize of the Russian Federation for the work of the Studio School EDAS.

2000 – a head of the school of architecture professor Peter Cook invited Vladislav Kirpichev to teach at Bartlett http://www.bartlett.ucl.ac.uk/ University College London http://www.ucl.ac.uk/ (Bartlett School of Architecture, UCL) In Bartlett Kirpichev led the group in the diploma course at school and postgraduate. Simultaneously, he led a group in the School of Architecture of the University of Greenwich (Greenwich University School of Architecture).

2004 - Vladislav Kirpichev initiated in Moscow creating NOA ( Informal Association of Architects ), in support of which the period from 2004 to 2006 ( in the educational program EDAS) he organized a series of famous lectures by prominent contemporary architects. Among the invited people was Zaha Hadid (Zaha Hadid Architects), Benedetta Tagliabue (Benedetta Tagliabue, Miralles-Tagliabue Architects), Steven Holl (Steven Holl Architects), Sir Peter Cook (Sir Peter Cook), Thom Mayne (Thom Mayne, Morphosis), Wolf Prix (Wolf Prix, Coop Himmelblau), Greg Lynn (Greg Lynn Form), Klaus Bollinger and Manfred Grohmann (Bollinger + Grohmann), Ian Ritchie, Eric Oven Moss, Christian Müller (Christian Moeller), Jesse Reiser (Reiser + Umemoto), Kas Osterhus and Ilona Lenard (Kaas Oosterhuis, ONL) and others.

2007 - Vladislav Kirpichev was appointed chief designer of the St. Petersburg International Economic Forum (XI SPIEF), in which he was also the organizer and curator of the international exhibition of modern architecture. Joining him in the opening was attended by Sir Norman Foster, Kisho Kurokawa and director of the German Architecture Museum (DAM) Peter Cachola Schmal.

2013 - Support Fund was registered Vladislav Kirpichev studio. In the Board of Trustees includes, among others, Yuri Norstein, Andrey Zvyagintsev, Marina Loshak.

2014 - Kirpichev played a cameo role in a feature film directed by Andrei Zvyagintsev, "Leviathan".

=== Honors and awards ===
- Competition of the International Union of Architects (1972)
- Grand Prix of UNESCO (1972)
- State Prize of the Russian Federation (1993)

=== Activity ===
EDAS - Experimental Children Architectural Studio - a non-governmental studio supplementary education for children was founded by Vladislav Kirpichev in 1977.

Classes are the author's procedure, involving children dive into the atmosphere of modern plastic problems, which is the formation of composite thinking, foster a sense of form, space, rhythm, texture, color .

The activity of Vladislav Ivanovich Kirpichev is widely known abroad, thereby EDAS constantly participates in various international events. Lectures and workshops are studios around the world, and exhibitions and installations Kirpichev's students exhibited in museums and at major exhibition venues : German Architecture Museum (DAM, Frankfurt am Main), in Documenta Archiv ( Kassel, Germany ), in the Pacific Design Center, Whitney Museum ( USA), the Central Exhibition Hall Manege in Moscow ( 1990), the Central House of Artists on the Crimean Val ( 1993 ), the National Center for Architecture (NAI, Rotterdam), the Institute for Cultural Policy (iCP, Hamburg) and others. In 2001, together with the Serpentine Gallery in Hyde Park in London was an action "100 children - 100 meters."

Vladislav Kirpichev twice participated in events Aspen Institute (http://www.aspeninstitute.org/): in 2004 - in the International Design Conference (idca: 54) and in 2005 - in the Aspen Ideas Festival (http:/ / www.aspenideas.org/). July 9, 2005, U.S. President Bill Clinton personally greeted Vladislav Kirpichev in Aspen.

And in 2008, during the international festival The Darmstadt Summer of Architecture, installation EDAS "10,000 lights» gathered at the opening of more than 10 thousand of people.

=== Scientific activity ===
To date, there are more than 500 publications about the school, the principles and methods of teaching Vladislav Kirpichev in Russian and foreign media.
