= Ysrael Seinuk =

Structural engineer

- Born: 21 December 1931; Havana, Cuba
- Died: 14 September 2010 (aged 78); New York City, US
- Education: University of Havana
- Spouse: Fanny Seinuk
- Children: Beatrice Seinuk-Ackerman; Isaac Seinuk
- Engineering career
- Discipline: Structural engineer
- Practice name: Cantor Seinuk, Ysrael A. Seinuk, P.C.
- Projects: Trump World Tower, Condé Nast Building, Lipstick Building, O-14 Tower

Ysrael Abraham Seinuk (December 21, 1931 – September 14, 2010) was an engineer who designed the structure for many landmark skyscrapers in New York City and around the world. He also taught structural engineering at New York's Cooper Union and was ranked by Time magazine as one of the 25 "Most Influential Hispanics in America."

Seinuk worked on structures including New York's Lipstick Building, the New York Mercantile Exchange, the 48-story Condé Nast Building, the 45-story Bear Stearns Building, and the Arthur Ashe Stadium. He also worked on the Chapultepec Tower in Mexico City and the O-14 tower in Dubai. Seinuk worked on a number of skyscrapers for Donald Trump, including the 70-story Trump World Tower, Trump International Hotel and Tower, and the 58-story Trump Tower on Fifth Avenue. Trump said of Seinuk, "Ysrael Seinuk and his staff are the best in the business."

== Early years ==
Seinuk was born in Havana, Cuba in 1931. He was the only child of Jaime Seinuk, who had moved there from Lithuania, and Sara Seinuk. Seinuk studied at the University of Havana and graduated in 1954. He moved to New York after Fidel Castro's rise to power. Seinuk recalled that he arrived in the United States with little more than $20 in his pocket, "my slide rule and my diploma from the University of Havana."

== Structural engineer ==
After the Communist Regime toppled the Cuban Government in 1959, he marched into exile, and arrived in New York to commence his life again. In New York, Seinuk joined the engineering firm of Abrams, Hertzberg & Cantor. He later became a named partner of what became known as Cantor Seinuk (the company was later acquired by WSP Group). He also founded a separate firm, Ysrael A. Seinuk, P.C., in 1977.

Seinuk became one of the world's foremost experts in the structural design of skyscrapers. The New York Times wrote that Seinuk "made it possible for many of New York City's tallest new buildings to withstand wind, gravity and even earthquakes. He has been credited with innovations in the use of reinforced concrete as a structural material in skyscrapers. Elizabeth O'Donnell, associate dean of architecture at Cooper Union, called him "the person who brought reinforced concrete to New York City, because this was primarily a city where its high-rises were structured in steel." In 2004, Real Estate Weekly wrote, "You can't walk down the streets of Manhattan without seeing a building that famed structural engineer Ysrael Seinuk hasn't touched." Seinuk and the firm he heads engineered more than 50 high-rise office buildings and hundreds of apartment structures in New York. He was dubbed "Mr. New York" for his engineering of New York's skyscrapers. Seinuk said, "My work has always been about stretching the horizon."

Seinuk worked on a number of skyscrapers for Donald Trump, including the 70-story Trump World Tower, Trump International Hotel and Tower, and the 58-story Trump Tower on Fifth Avenue. Trump said of Seinuk, "Ysrael Seinuk and his staff are the best in the business."

Other structures that Seinuk worked on include New York's Lipstick Building, the New York Mercantile Exchange, the 48-story Condé Nast Building, the 45-story Bear Stearns Building, and the Arthur Ashe Stadium. He also worked on the Chapultepec Tower in Mexico City and the O-14 tower in Dubai. Seinuk has compared his projects to children: "Projects are like children. Some are very talkative, some are very smart, some are very playful.

Seinuk taught structural engineering at Cooper Union for much of his career.

In 2005, Time magazine ranked Seinuk as one of the 25 "Most Influential Hispanics in America."

He was honored with The Fazlur Khan Lifetime Achievement Medal from the Council on Tall Buildings and Urban Habitat in 2010.

== Later years and death ==
Seinuk lived in the Forest Hills, Queens section of New York in his later years. He died of cancer in September 2010 in Manhattan. He was survived by his wife, Fanny Seinuk, a son, Isaac Seinuk, a daughter, Beatriz Seinuk-Ackerman, six grandchildren, and one great-grandchild.
