= O14 (disambiguation) =

O14 is a set of model railway standards.

O14 may also refer to:

- O-14 (Dubai), a skyscraper in the United Arab Emirates
- Douglas O-14, an aircraft
- HNLMS O 14, a submarine of the Royal Netherlands Navy
- Oxygen-14, an isotope of oxygen
- USS O-14 (SS-75), a submarine of the United States Navy
