= Asia New Bay Area =

Development area of Kaohsiung, Taiwan

Coordinates: 22°36′32″N 120°17′56″E

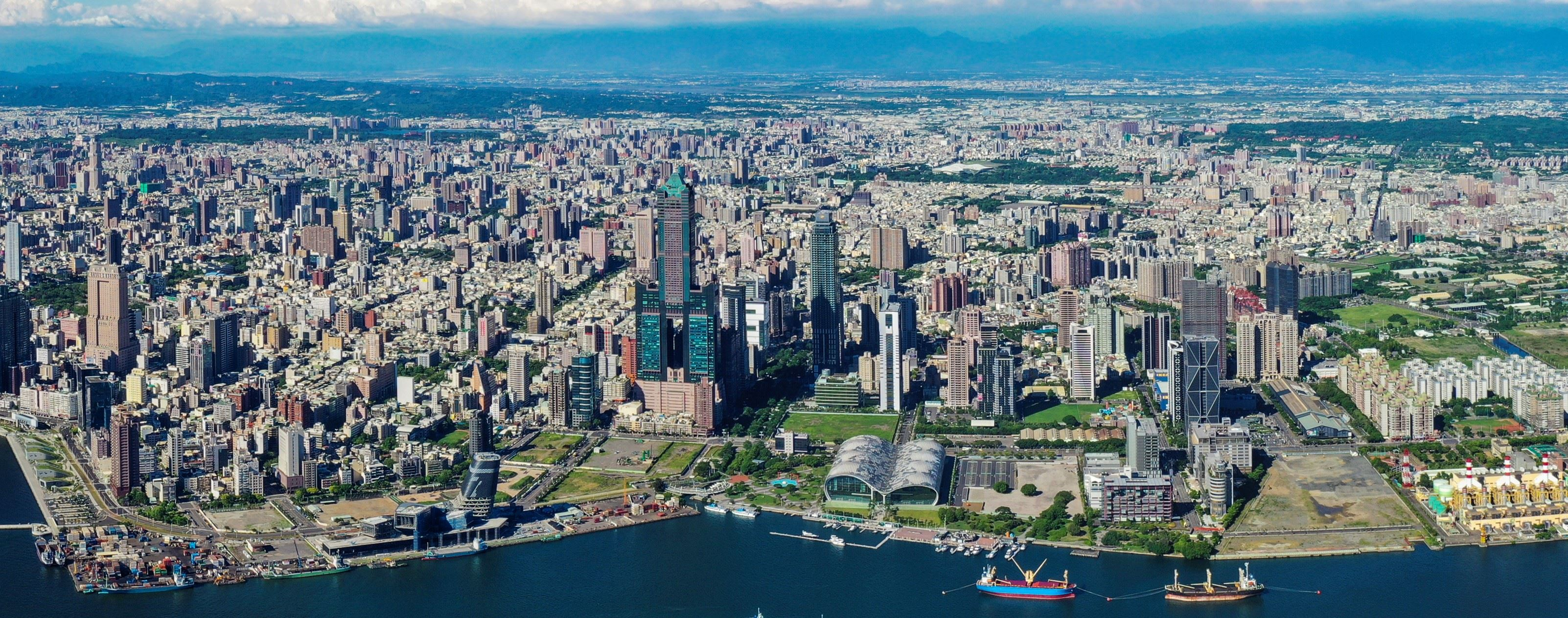
Asia New Bay Area in 2023

Asia New Bay Area (Chinese: 亞洲新灣區) is an industrial, exhibition and cultural site located at Kaohsiung, Taiwan. It is a major construction of Kaohsiung City's industrial transformation, in order to promote the urban development of Kaohsiung Harbor and downtown Kaohsiung.

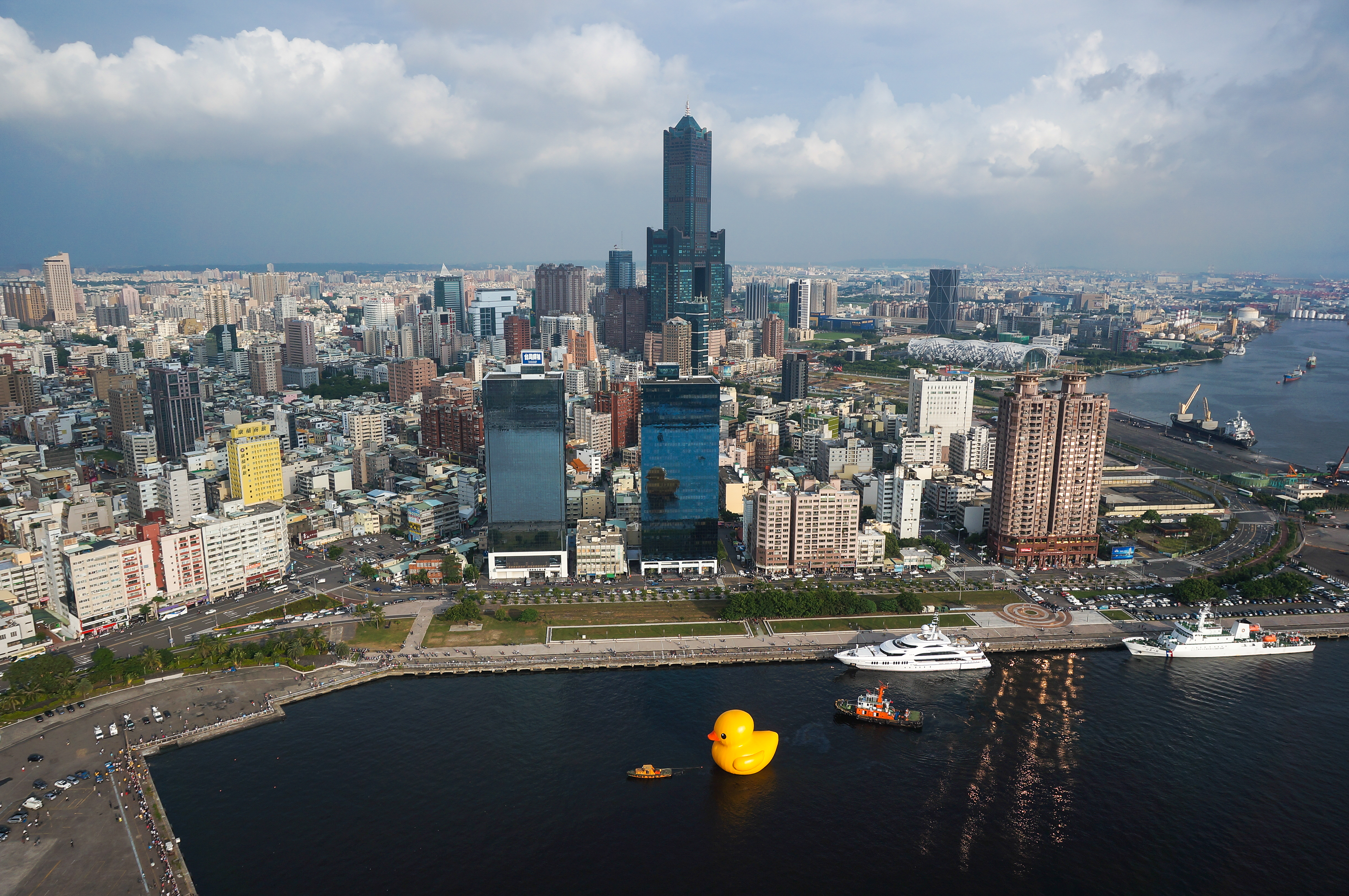
Asia New Bay Area in 2013

The area of Asia New Bay Area is about 600 hectares (1,500 acres) and the total investment amount is about NT$ 130 billion, with funds coming from the Central and Kaohsiung City Government, along with investments from enterprises. Asia's New Bay Area expands Kaohsiung's international visibility, enabling Kaohsiung to become a Global City to further attract both domestic and foreign investors.

== Range ==
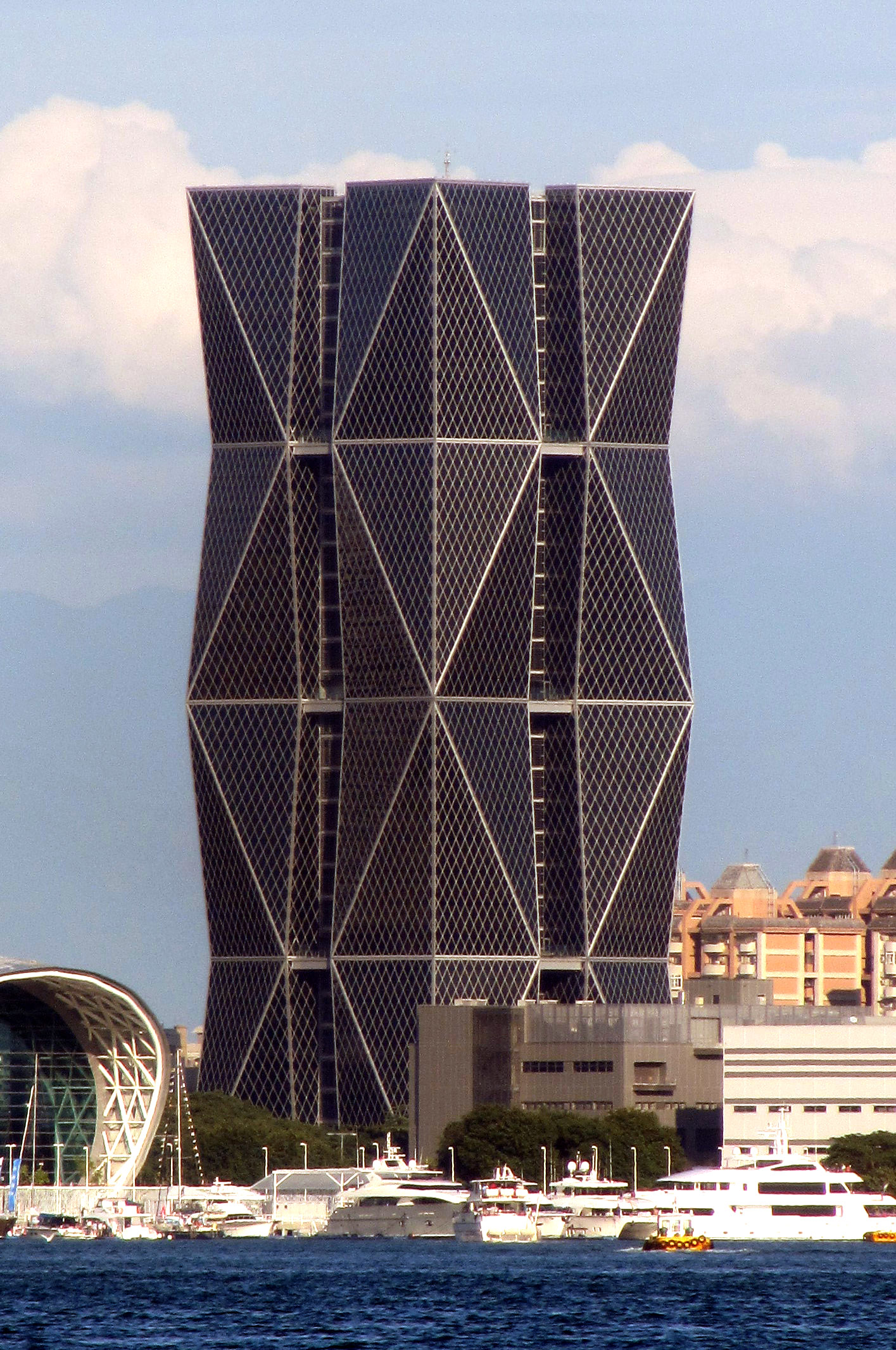
China Steel Corporation Headquarters in Kaohsiung

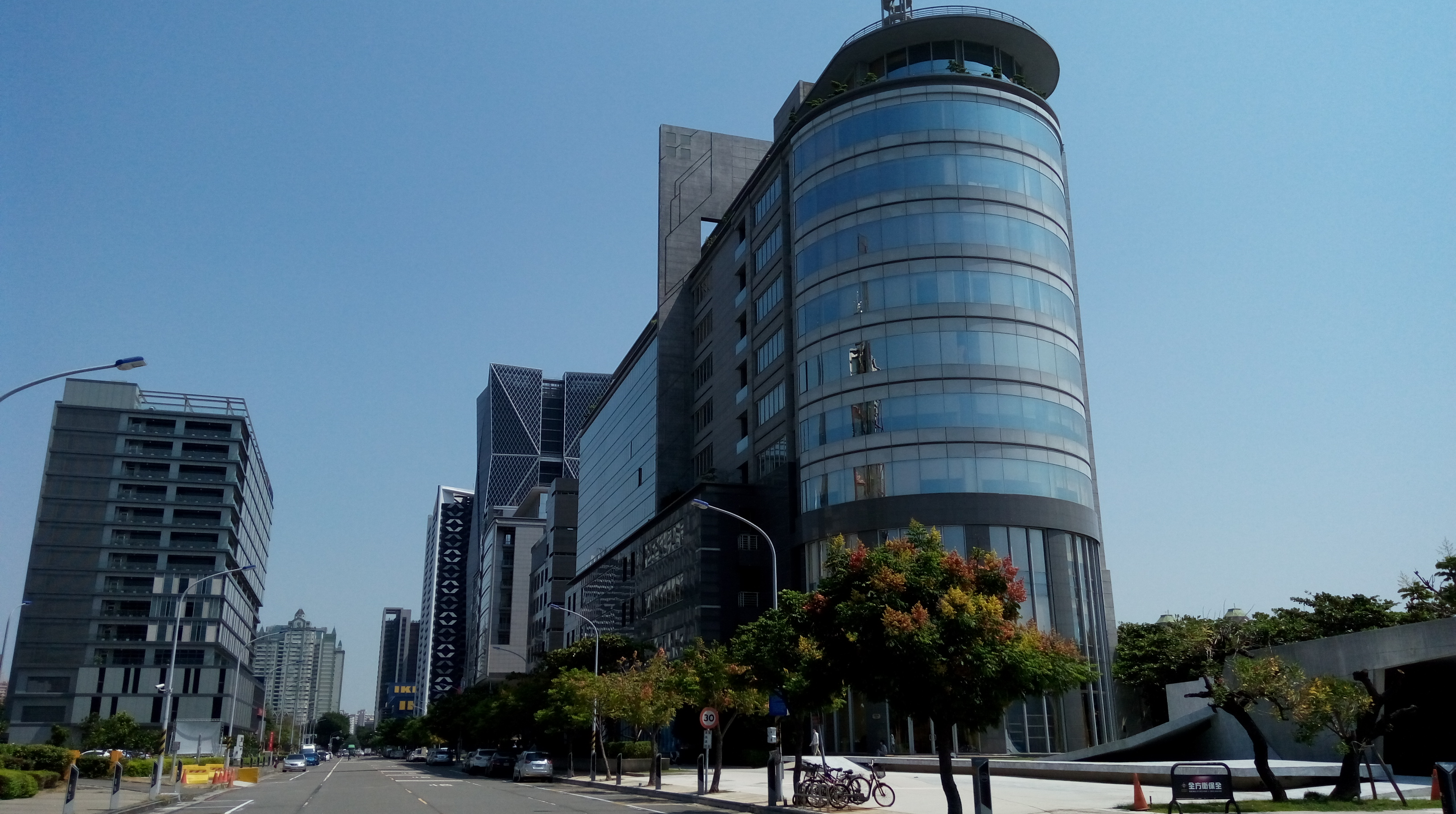
Kaohsiung Software Technology Park

The total area of the Asia New Bay Area is more than 600 hectares. It is south of Kaixuan Road, the north is Wufu Road, the east side is Yixin Road, and the west is to Gushan Hamasen.

- Kaohsiung Exhibition Center
- Kaohsiung Main Public Library
- Kaohsiung Port Cruise Terminal
- Kaohsiung Music Center
- Circular light rail
- 85 Sky Tower
- China Steel Corporation Headquarters
- Kaohsiung Software Park
- Sanduo Shopping District metro station
- Dream Mall
- Taroko Park

== Development and construction ==
The Asia New Bay Area is located at the port of Kaohsiung city or in its immediate vicinity. The 500-acre site spans parts of the Gushan, Yancheng, Lingya and Cianjhen districts. The facilities are located on previously industrialized land, which had become vacant and fallow due to the transformation and rationalization of Kaohsiung Harbor. All the buildings in the Asia New Bay Area plan on adopting international competition and the concept of green buildings, which hope to promote Kaohsiung City's film industry, exhibition, culture, tourism and Yacht industries.

=== Hotels ===
- Hotel Nikko Kaohsiung
- InterContinental Kaohsiung

=== Kaohsiung Exhibition Center ===
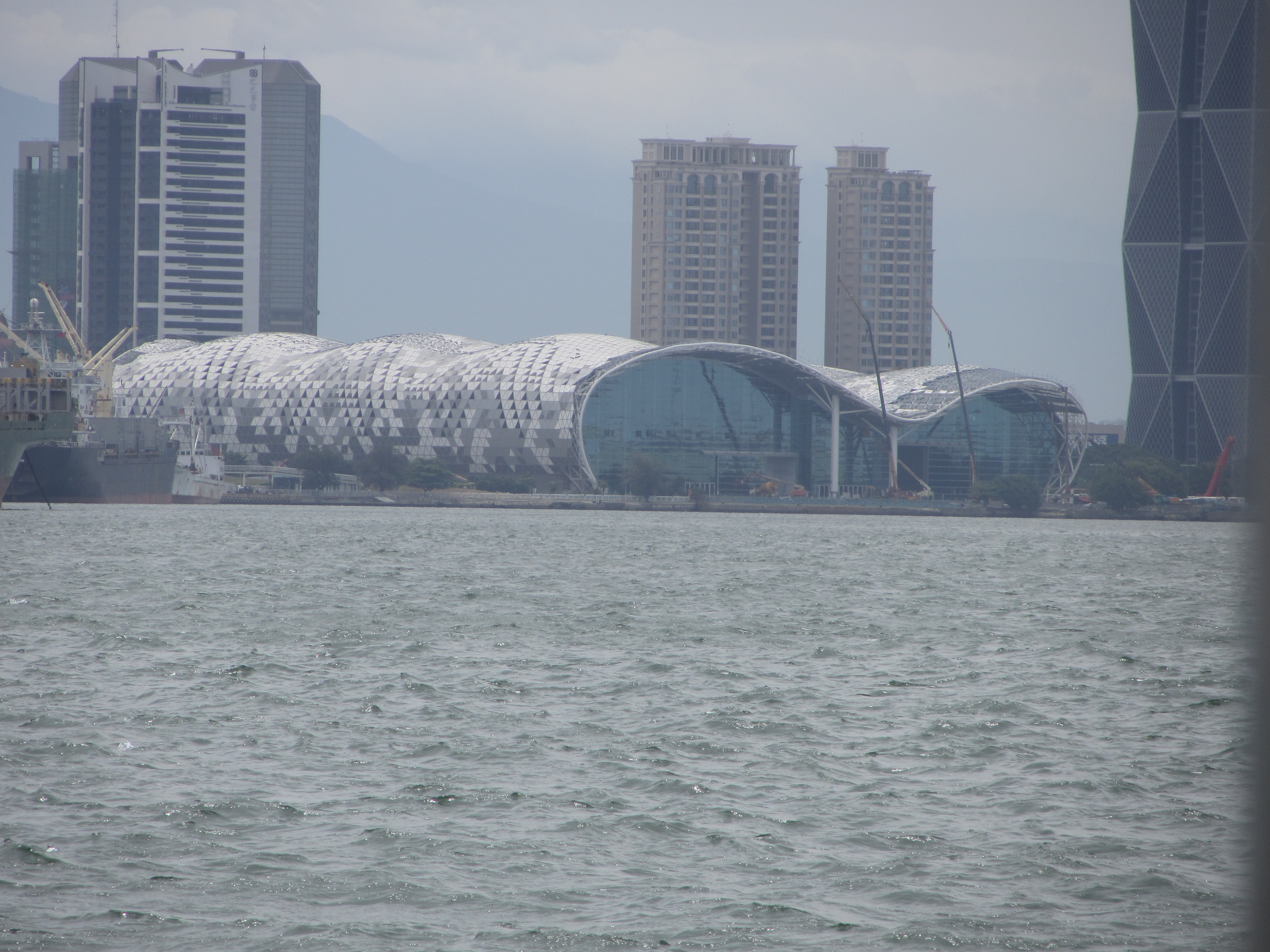
Kaohsiung Exhibition Center

Construction on the Kaohsiung Exhibition Center began in October 2011, and on October 18, 2013, the finished building was opened. The first fair held here was the "Taiwan International Fastener Show" on April 14, 2014. In the immediate vicinity of the center, there is the modern high-rise building with the headquarters of China Steel Corporation.

=== Kaohsiung Music Center ===
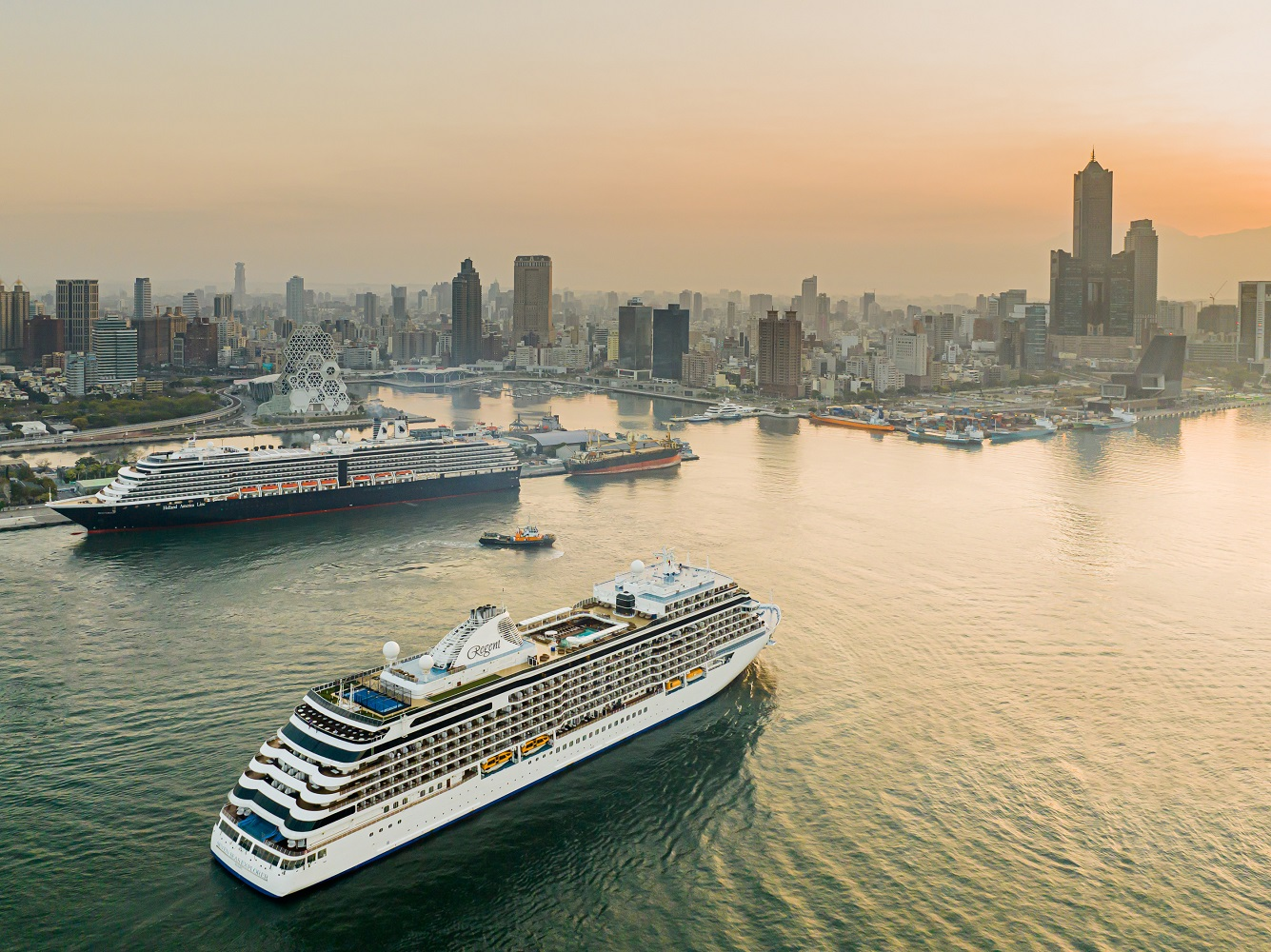
Skyline of Kaohsiung in 2023 with the Kaohsiung Music Center.

The area of the center extends from Pier 11 to Pier 15 of the port. It consists of an outer concert hall for 12,000 spectators, an inner concert hall for 6,000 spectators and six smaller concert halls for 150 to 400 spectators. It also includes a marine culture exhibition center, a water park, a bike path and a cultural and creative market. The expected completion is planned for August 2020.

=== Kaohsiung Port Cruise Terminal ===
The Kaohsiung Port Cruise Terminal stretches from pier 18 to pier 21 of the Kaohsiung Harbor and includes an administration building, a conference hall and three jetties. The size of the terminal is sufficient to simultaneously accommodate two 225,000-tonne cruise ships. Construction of the terminal started in 9 November 2013 and was completed on 31 August 2022.

=== Kaohsiung Main Public Library ===
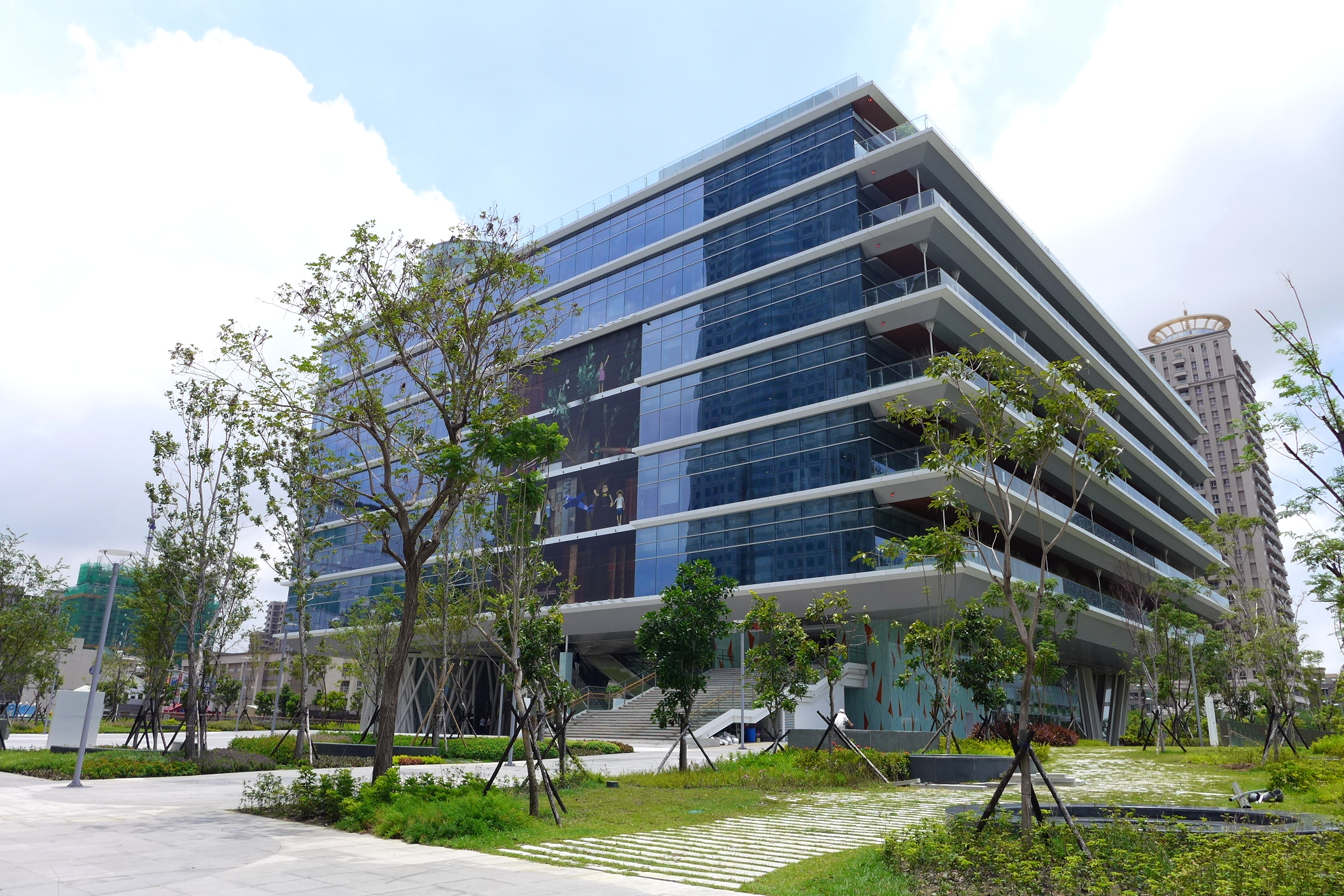
Kaohsiung Main Public Library

The 20,000 square meter area houses the Kaohsiung Main Public Library, Taiwan's largest public library. It is an ecological building with eight floors and a basement. The book inventory has over 1 million volumes. The library includes a department for international picture books and a children's theater, the first institution of its kind in the country. Architecture and design work were done by Ricky Liu and the Japanese architect Toyo Ito's team. Construction started in October 2012 and was completed in 2014. The Library opened to the public in November 2014. In 2017 the library was regarded as one of the top 10 landmarks of Taiwan by TripAdvisor.

=== Circular light rail ===
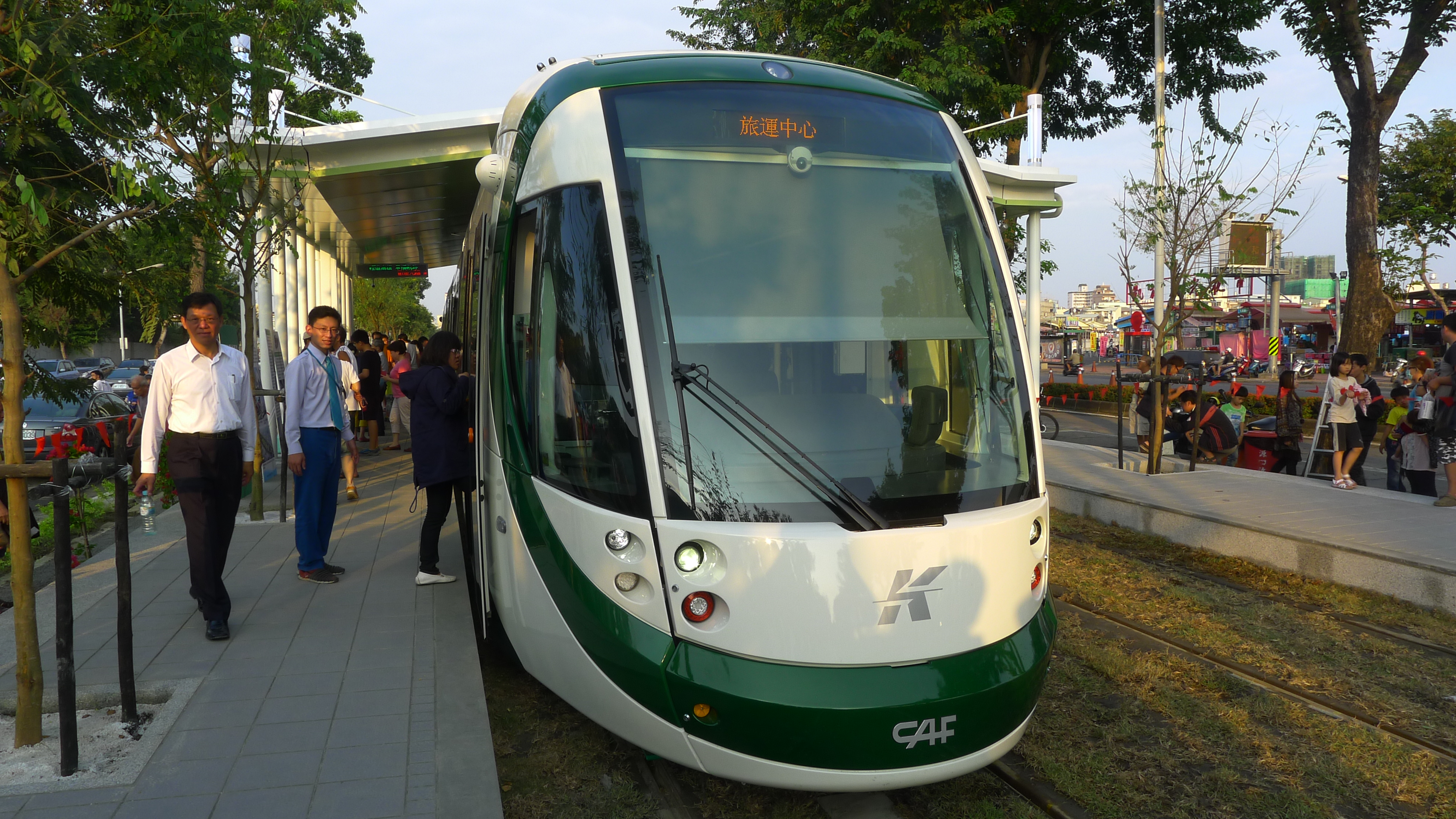
Circular light rail

The Circular light rail of Kaohsiung Rapid Transit in Taiwan is a ring-free route with no overhead lines. It is Taiwan's first tram. It has 36 stations and its route runs along the Kaohsiung attractions.

== See also ==
- Xinyi Special District
- Taichung's 7th Redevelopment Zone
- Taichung Shuinan Economic and Trade Park
