= EDAS-Kirpichev School-Studio =

EDAS - Experimental Children's Architectural Studio (also known as EDAS-Kirpichev School-Studio) was founded in 1977. It is not a public educational institution. Classes are held by the author's method, assuming the maximum involvement of students in the creative process. It enrolls children from age 2.5–16 years.

== About the school ==
School-Studio EDAS (Experimental Children's Architectural Studio), a non-governmental studio of additional education for children, was founded in 1977. The classes are held by the original technique (art technique), with the maximum involvement of pupils in the creative process. In the process of learning Kirpichev immerses children in the atmosphere of modern plastic problems in which occurs the formation of the project and compositional thinking, the feeling of form, space, rhythm, texture, color.

== International recognition ==
In 2001, together with the Serpentine Gallery in Hyde Park in London was an action "100 children - 100 meters."

Vladislav Kirpichev has twice participated in the events of the Aspen Institute; in 2004 in the work of the International Design Conference, and in 2005 in the work of the Aspen Ideas Festival.

== About the fund ==
In August 2013 in Moscow was registered EDAS Fund (Foundation for the Support and Development of School-studio of Vladislav Kirpichev EDAS).
