= Maritime passenger terminal =

Structure in a port which services passengers boarding and leaving water vessels

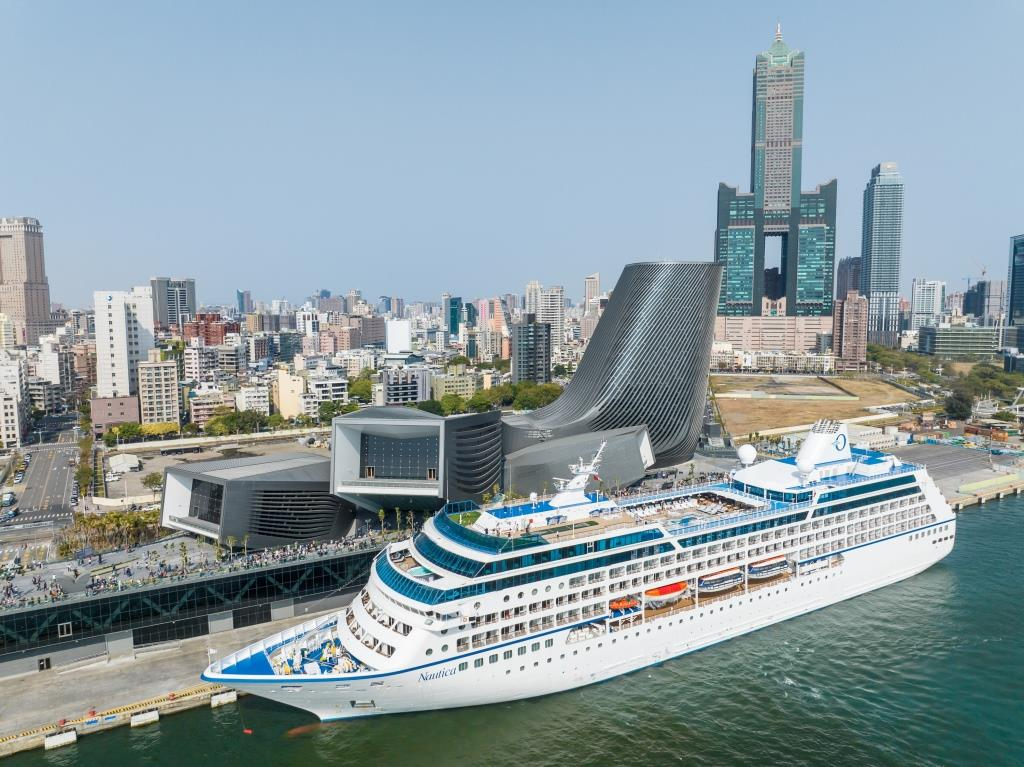
Kaohsiung Port Cruise Terminal in Kaohsiung, Taiwan.

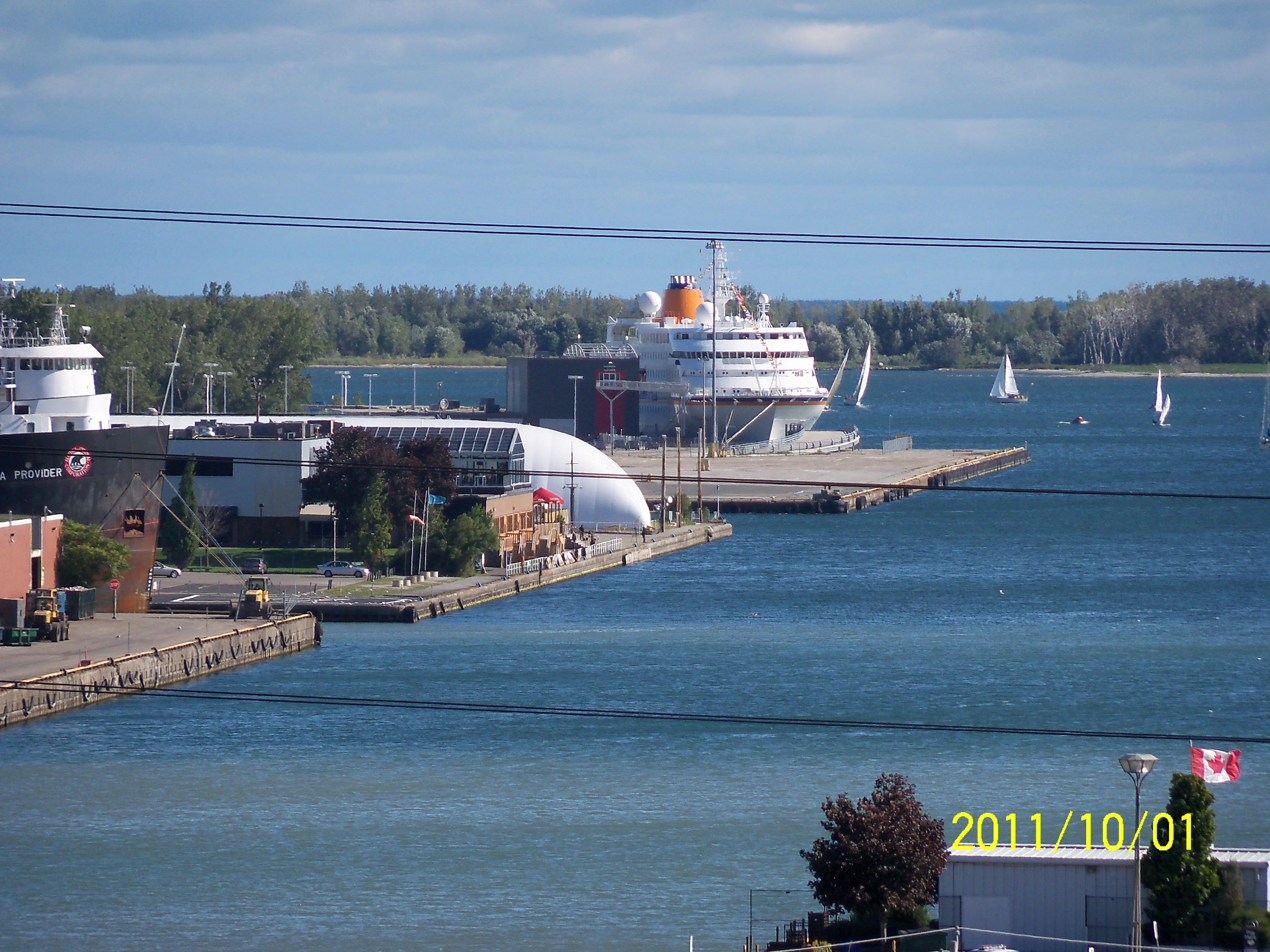
Toronto's International Marine Passenger Terminal.

A passenger terminal is a structure in a port which services passengers boarding and leaving water vessels such as ferries, cruise ships and ocean liners. Depending on the types of vessels serviced by the terminal, it may be named (for example) ferry terminal, cruise terminal, marine terminal or maritime passenger terminal. As well as passengers, a passenger terminal sometimes has facilities for automobiles and other land vehicles to be picked up and dropped off by the water vessel.

== Facilities ==
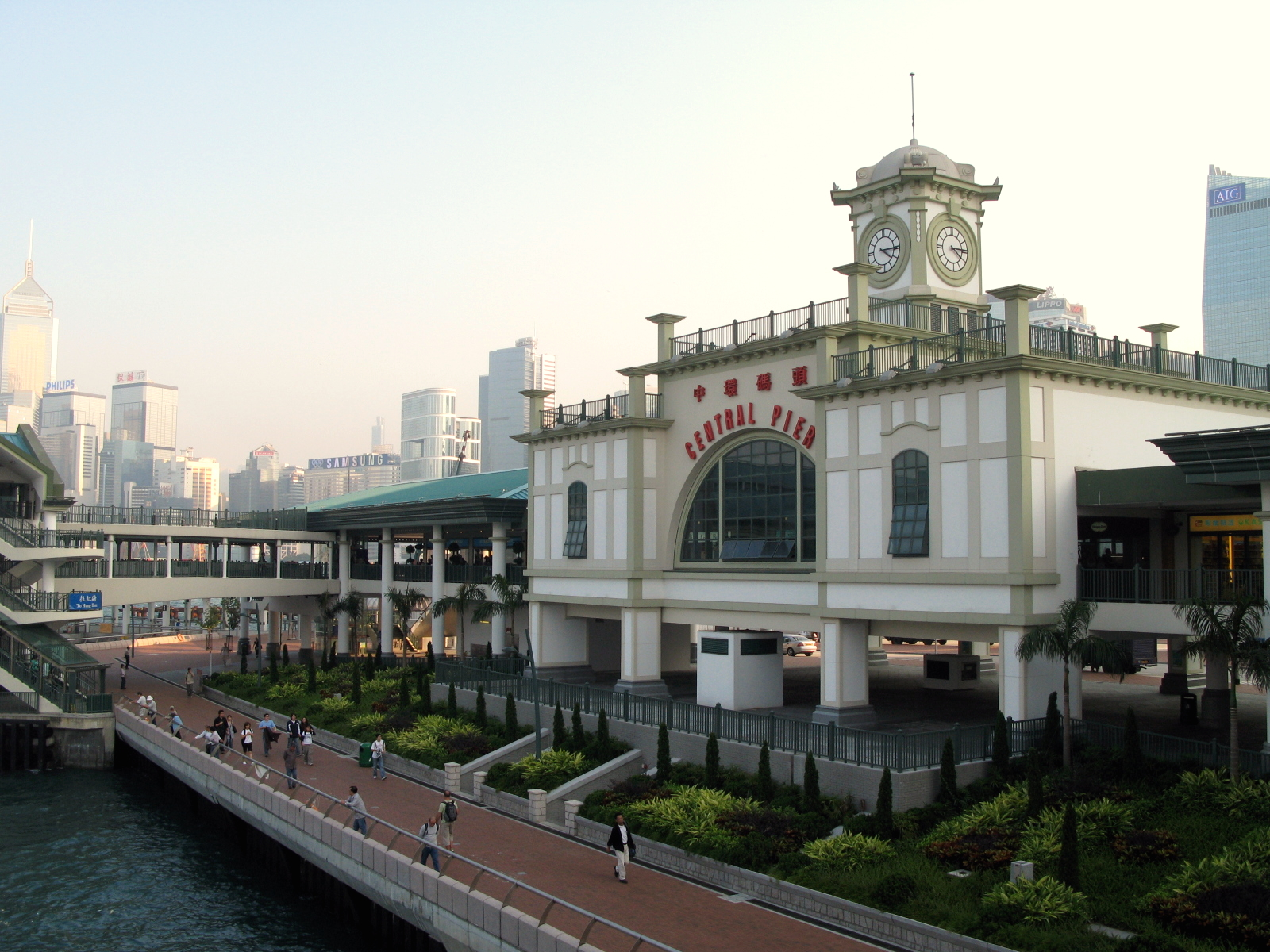
Central Pier is a small passenger terminal in Hong Kong servicing cross-harbour ferries and other small passenger vessels.

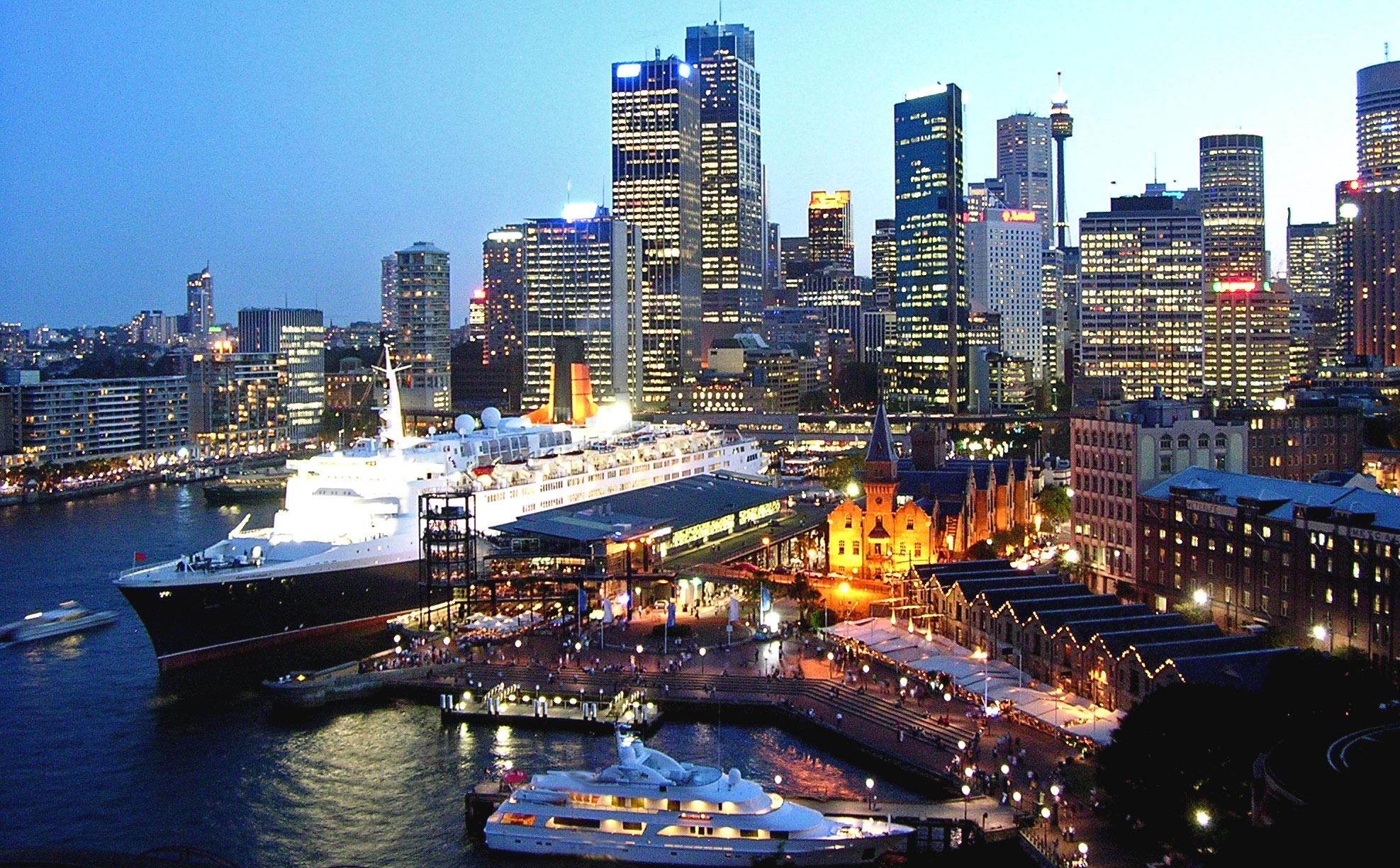
The Overseas Passenger Terminal in Sydney is a large passenger terminal capable of servicing large ocean liners and cruise ships.

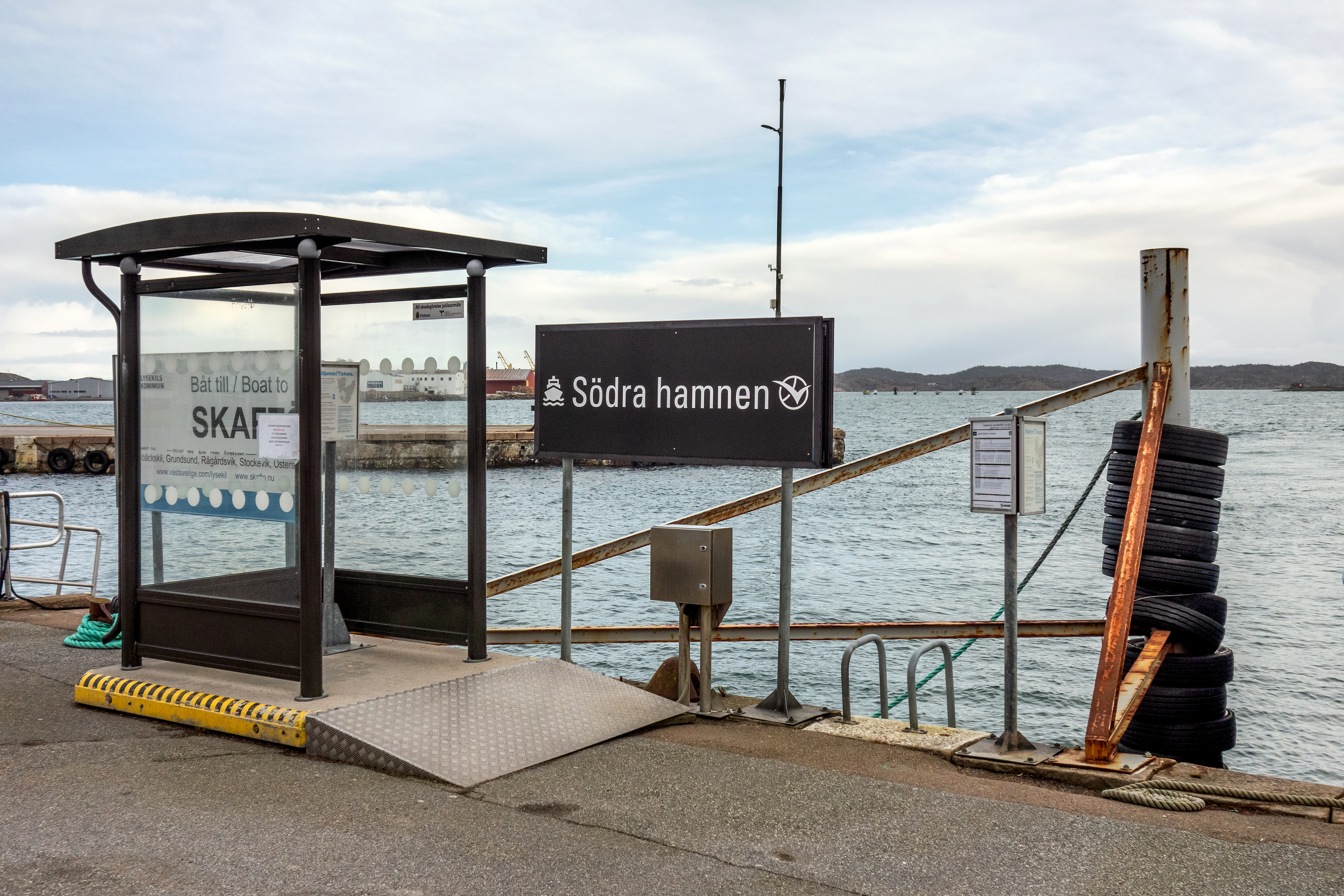
The very small South Harbor ferry terminal in Lysekil, Sweden

Passenger terminals may vary greatly in size. A small ferry terminal servicing a commuter ferry may just have the means to tie up the vessel and a waiting area for passengers. Even for a large, vehicle-carrying cross-sea ferry, the terminal at a small island location may be similar sized, with just a short ramp to enable vehicles to be driven onto the ferry.

Passengers may be loaded onto a ship from the wharf by a gangway or by a linkspan. Goods packed in containers may be driven onto the vessel by a vehicle which then detaches itself from the container and returns to shore.

If the passenger terminal handles vehicles (which is common especially in cross-sea ferry terminals), it will usually have the facilities, such as appropriate markings on the ground, to enable the vehicles to line up in an orderly manner. Vehicles may be driven off the ship directly, if the vessel is a Roll-on/roll-off ship.

Passenger terminals in large ports usually have passenger facilities comparable with medium-sized airports, including waiting areas, ticketing desks, luggage deposit and retrieval areas, and food, beverage and other retail outlets. Ferry terminals for international ferries, such as those crossing between the United Kingdom and continental Europe, also have customs and immigration inspection facilities and security control areas similar to an international airport.

Historically, the largest passenger terminals were located in major coastal cities servicing large ocean liners. With the demise of most ocean liners in the later half of the 20th century and the rise of cruise ship tourism in its stead, the largest passenger terminals today are those in "cruise home ports". In addition to extensive facilities to service passengers, these terminals must also be capable of handling the large amount of supplies required by large cruise ships and ocean liners.

Major passenger ports (such as the Port of Southampton) tend to have numerous docks and wharves, some with multiple berths, in order to handle more than one ship simultaneously. Some ports have a single, large passenger terminal to service multiple docks, while others have multiple terminal buildings, each servicing a dock or wharf, so that passengers can board vessels directly from the terminal.

== Major passenger terminals ==
=== Australia ===
- Overseas Passenger Terminal, in Sydney
- Station Pier, in Melbourne
- Brisbane International Cruise Terminal In Brisbane

=== Canada ===
- Canada Place, in Vancouver

=== China ===
- International Cruise Terminal, in Shanghai

=== Hong Kong ===
- Kai Tak Cruise Terminal, in Kai Tak
- Ocean Terminal, in Tsim Sha Tsui

=== Singapore ===
- Marina Bay Cruise Centre

=== Taiwan ===
- Kaohsiung Port Cruise Terminal, in Kaohsiung

=== United Kingdom ===
- Queen Elizabeth II Terminal, Mayflower Terminal, City Terminal, Horizon Terminal and Ocean Terminal, in Southampton

=== United States ===
- Brooklyn Cruise Terminal, in New York
- Manhattan Cruise Terminal, in New York
- Port Everglades cruise terminal, in Fort Lauderdale

== See also ==
- Ferry slip
- Landing (water transport)
- Linkspan
- Ocean liner
