= Taipei Music Center =

Performing arts venue in Taiwan

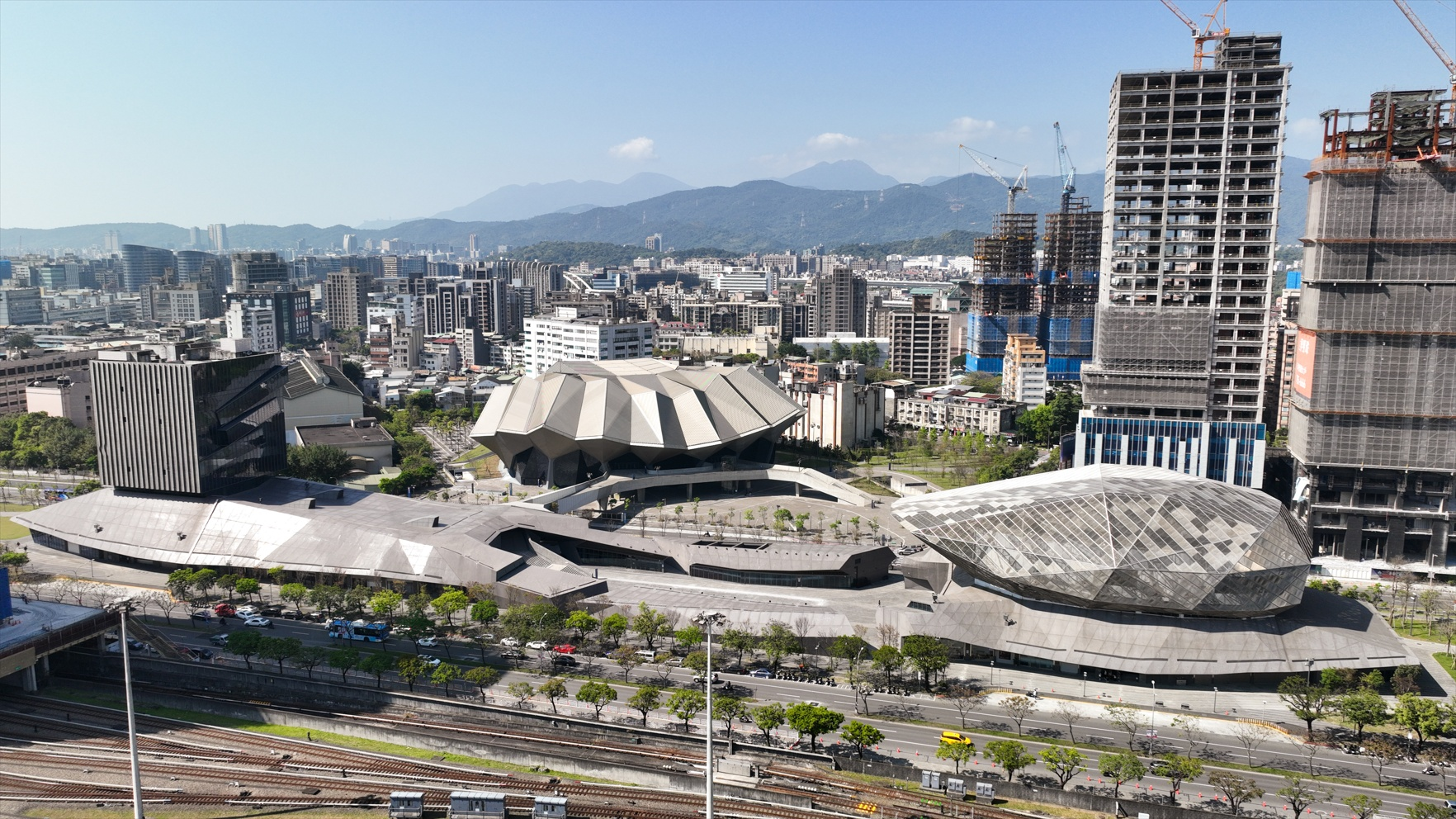
- Cultural hall (left), concert hall (center) and creative production facilities (right)
- Interactive map of Taipei Music Center
- Location: Nangang, Taipei, Taiwan
- Coordinates: 25°3′7″N 121°35′53″E
- Capacity: 6,300 (indoor theater); 15,000 (outdoor amphitheater)

Construction
- Groundbreaking: June 19, 2013
- Opened: September 5, 2020
- Cost: NTD$4.45 billion
- Architect: Reiser + Umemoto

The Taipei Music Center (TMC; Chinese: 台北流行音樂中心; pinyin: Táiběi Liúxíng Yīnyuè Zhōngxīn; lit. 'Taipei Popular Music Center') is a performing arts and cultural venue in Nangang District, Taipei, Taiwan, including a 5,000-seat concert hall, cultural hall and creative production facilities.

== Overview ==
City officials announced plans on July 24, 2008 to conduct an international design competition for the facility in tandem with plans for the Taipei Performing Arts Center. In 2012, government officials announced that winner of the design competition was Reiser + Umemoto, RUR Architecture P.C., the New York City based American architectural firm represented by a joint collaboration between American architect Jesse A. Reiser and Japanese architect Nanako Umemoto, both well known in the architectural world for their innovative post-modernist aesthetic. The firm is particularly well known for its recently completed office tower, 0-14, in Dubai, United Arab Emirates. Construction began on 19 June 2013.

The center opened on September 5, 2020, before hosting the 31st Golden Melody Awards on October 3.

== Entertainment events ==
Entertainment events at Taipei Music Center
Date	Artist	Event	Ref
2023
23-24 June	Ive	"The Prom Queens" Fan Concert Tour	
25 July	The 1975	At Their Very Best	
14-16 November	Westlife	The Wild Dreams Tour	
25 November	Yesung	Unfading Sense Solo Concert	
2024
22 June	Lee Young-ji	ALL OR NOTHING World Tour	
23 June	Babymonster	Babymonster Presents: See You There	
6 July	Perfume	COD3 OF P3RFUM3 ZOZ5 Asia Tour	
13 July	Suho	SUHO CONCERT <SU:HOME> ASIA TOUR	
16 August	Doyoung	[ Dear Youth, ] Concert	
30 November - 1 December	Milet	milet Asia Tour	
14 December	Taeyang	The Light Year Tour	
2025
15 February	JO1	Wherever We Are World Tour	
29-30 March	GFriend	GFriend 10th Anniversary Concert: Season of Memories	
5 April	Onew	Onew the Live: Connection	
12-13 April	Aimyon	“Dolphin Apartment” Tour	
24 May	NCT Wish	NCT Wish Asia Tour Log In	
28 June	Daesung	D's WAVE Asia Tour	
12 July	Kai	KAI Solo Concert Tour "KAION"	

== See also ==
- Music of Taiwan
