= Kaohsiung Port Cruise Terminal =

Cruise ship terminal in Kaohsiung, Taiwan

- 高雄港旅運中心
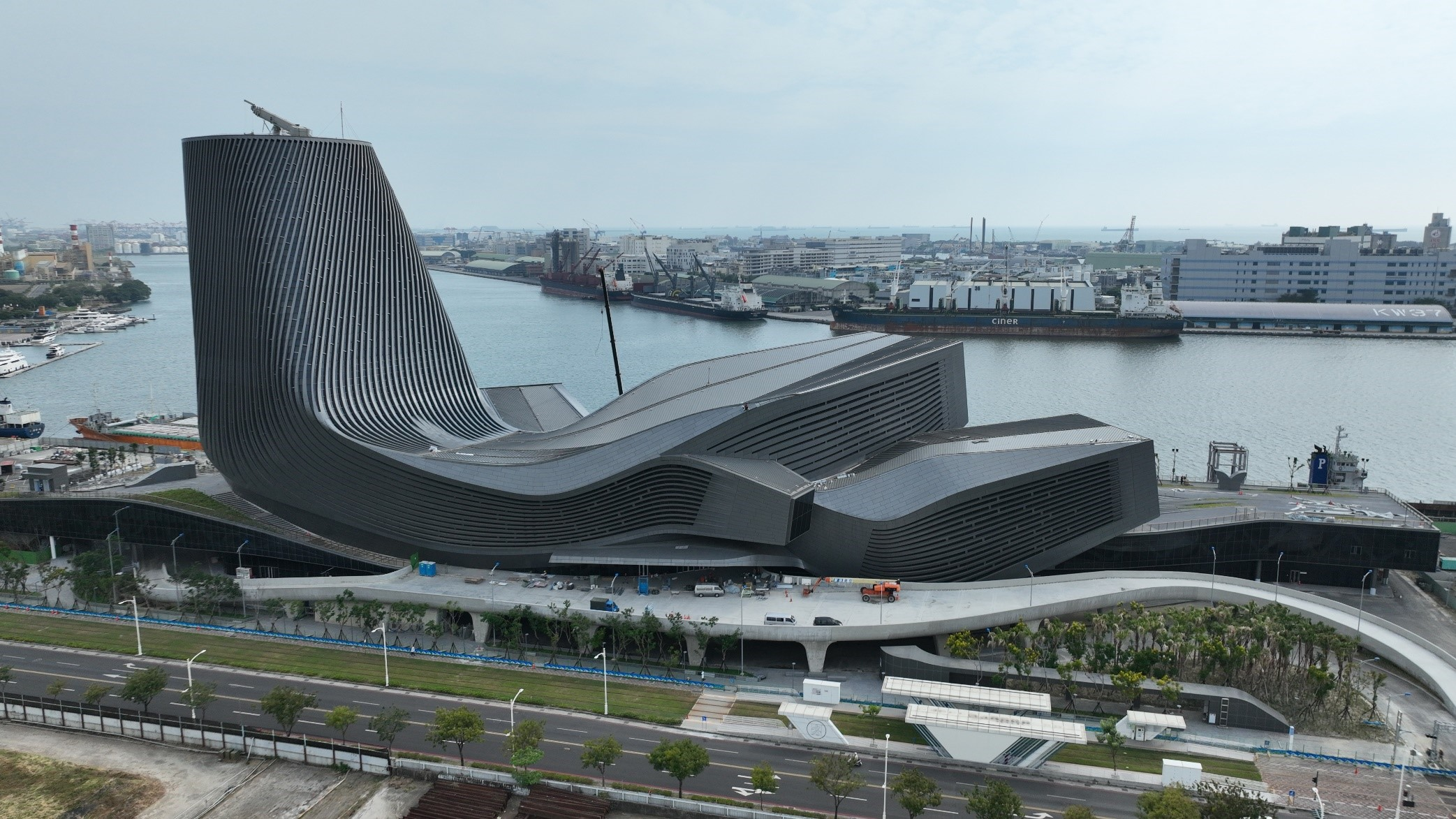
- Interactive map of the Kaohsiung Port Cruise Terminal area

General information
- Status: Operating
- Location: 5 Haibian Road, Lingya District, Kaohsiung, Taiwan
- Coordinates: 22°36′42″N 120°17′33″E
- Construction started: 9 November 2013
- Completed: 31 August 2022
- Opened: 6 March 2023; 3 years ago
- Cost: $4.5 billion Taiwan dollars
- Owner: Taiwan International Ports Corporation

Technical details
- Floor count: 15
- Floor area: 80,774 m^{2} (869,440 sq ft)

Design and construction
- Architect: Reiser + Umemoto
- Main contractor: Chun Yuan Construction

Kaohsiung Port Cruise Terminal is a cruise ship terminal located in Lingya District, Kaohsiung, Taiwan and is part of the Asia New Bay Area project. The building looks like a silver-white hull with a towering chimney. The total floor area is about 80,774 m^{2} (869,440 sq ft). The upper part is made of steel frame structure, with 15 floors above ground and 2 floors underground. It can berth two large cruise ships of 225,000 tons at the same time (capable of carrying 5,400 passengers and 2,400 crew members), and the maximum passenger service level can reach 2,000 people per hour. The design concept is to strengthen the integration of the port transportation center with the existing city and develop the commercial and leisure functions of the port space.

== History and development ==
The engineering and architectural competition for the facility was completed on December 10, 2010, and the bid was won by Taiwan's Zong Mai Architects and Reiser + Umemoto from the United States. On August 27, 2013, Chunyuan Construction won the first bid (main project) in the fourth public bidding. Construction started on November 9, 2013, and it officially opened on March 6, 2023.

== Transportation ==
The cruise ship terminal is within walking distance South from Cruise Terminal light rail station of the Kaohsiung Metro.

== Gallery ==
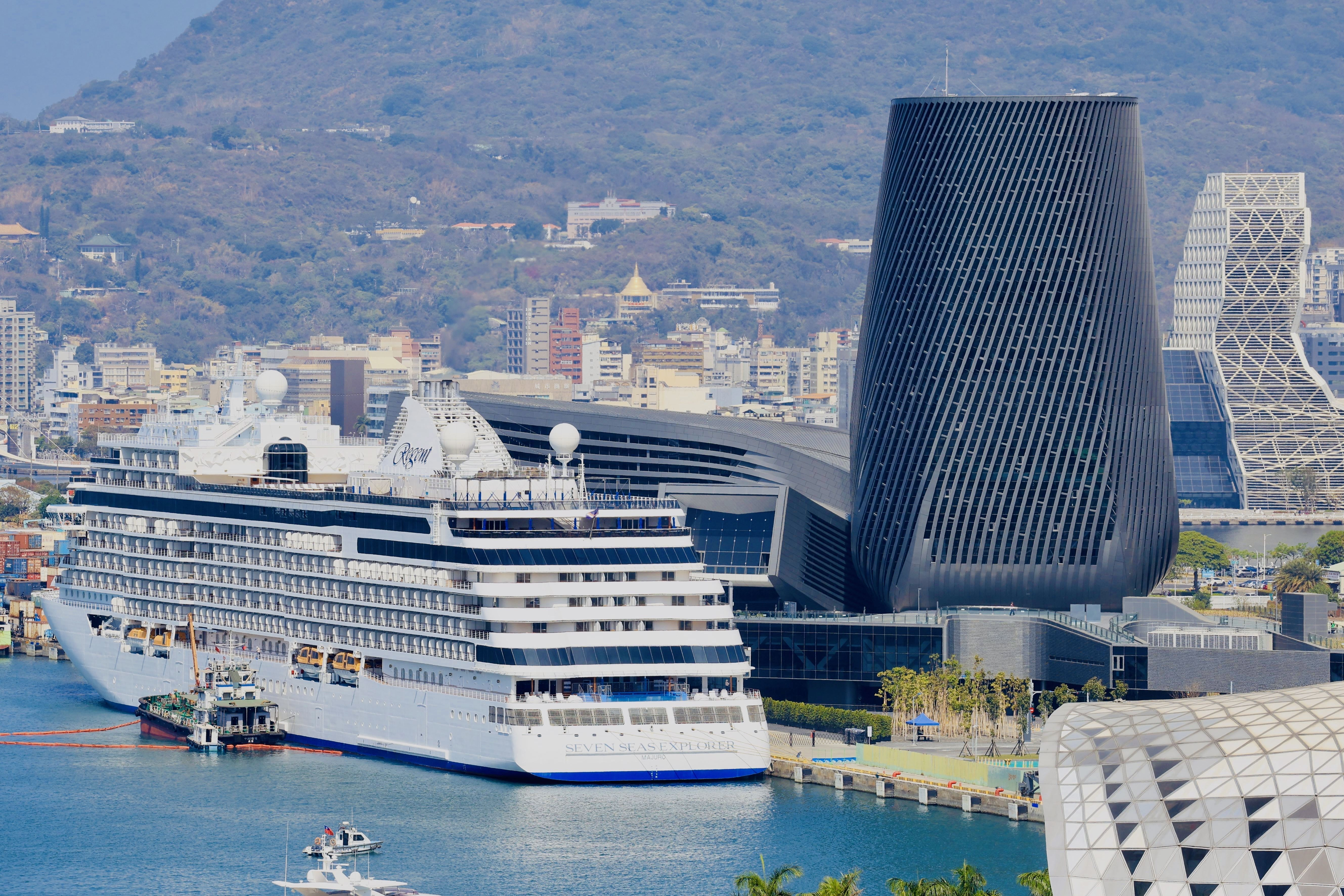
Kaohsiung Port Cruise Terminal

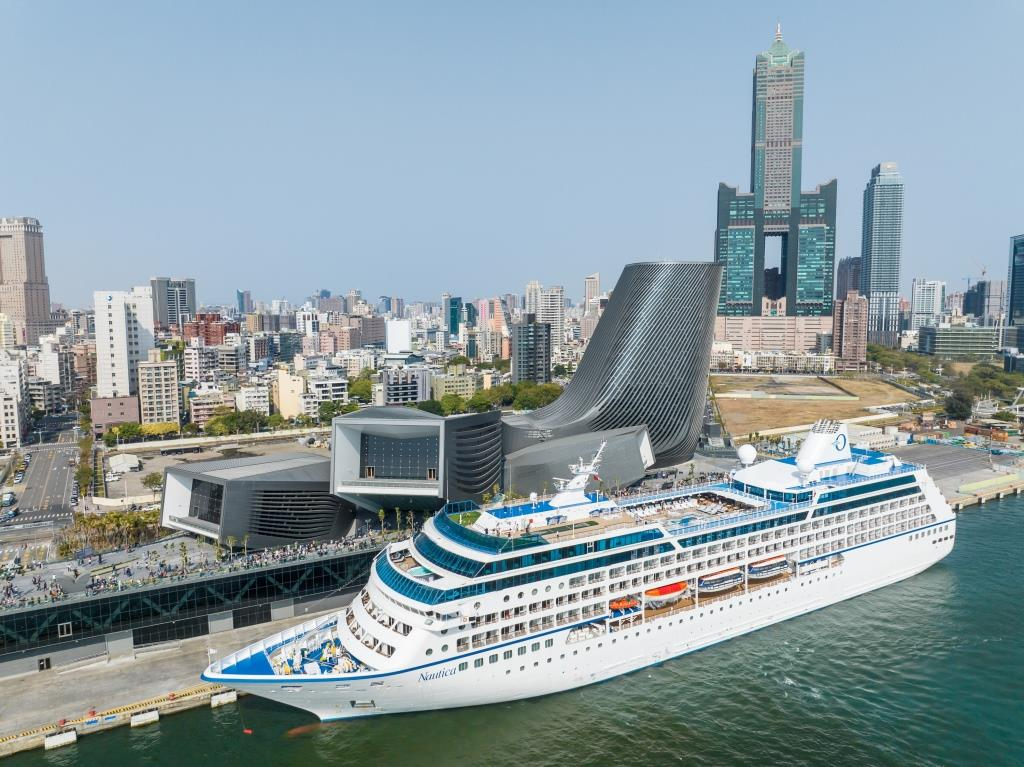
Kaohsiung Port Cruise Terminal

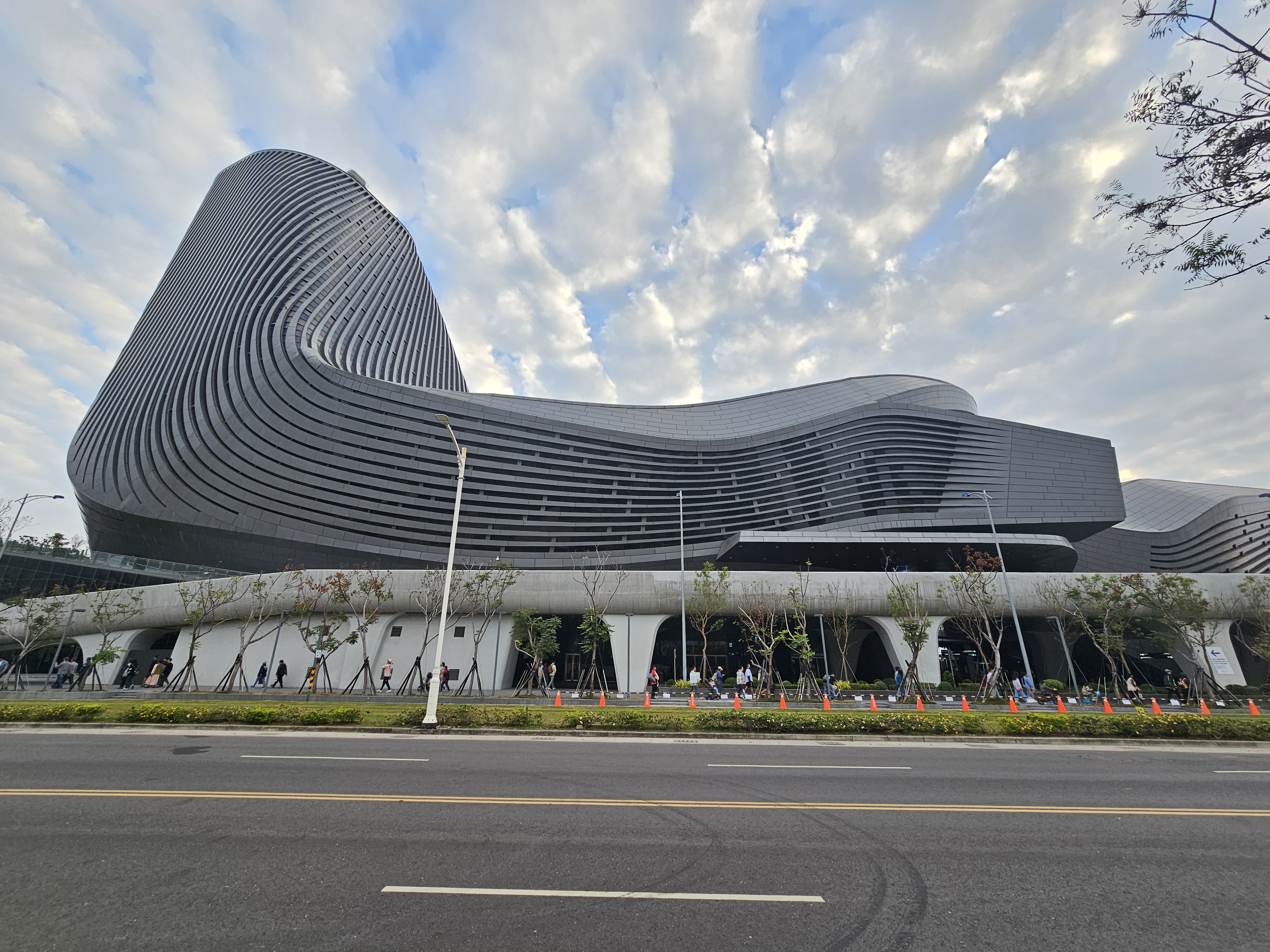
View from north of the building in 2024

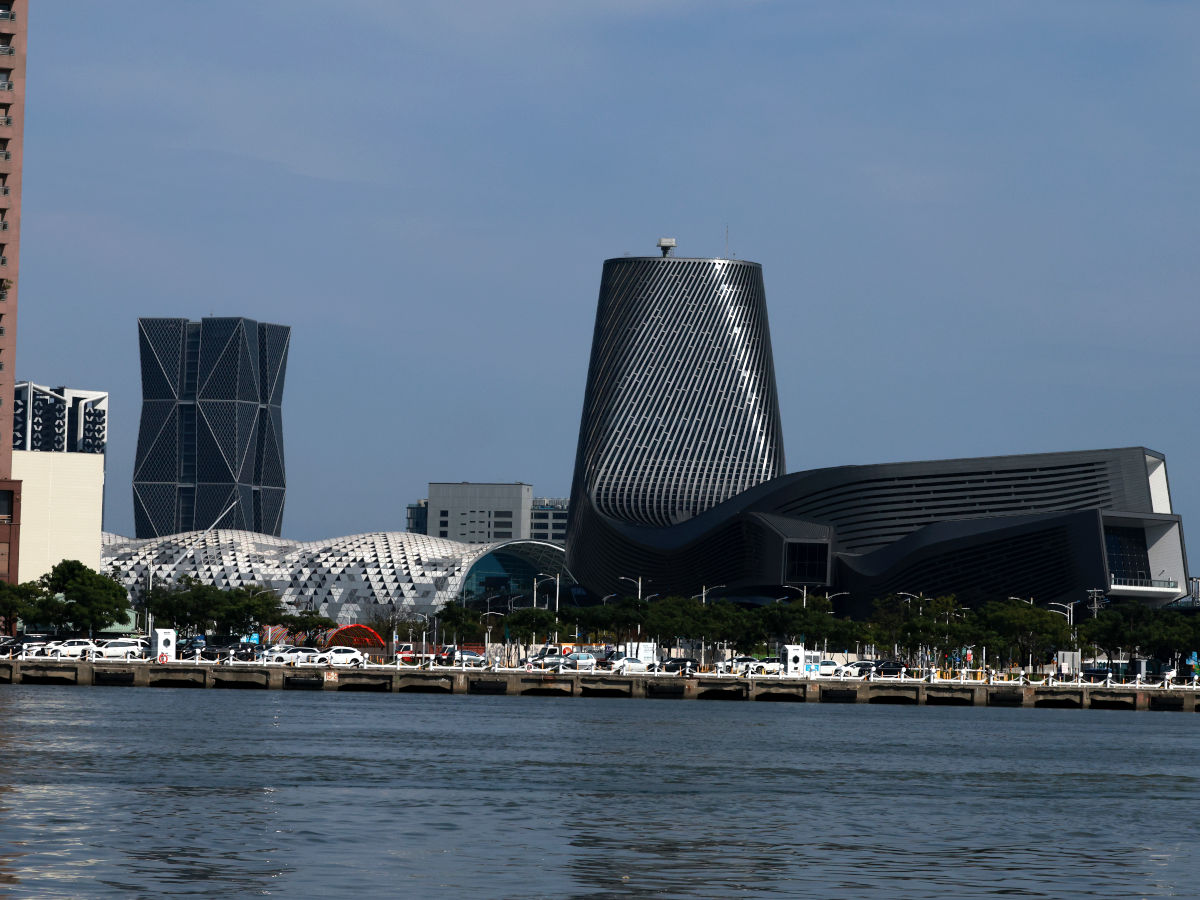
View from the west across Love River
