= Reiser + Umemoto =

American architectural firm

Reiser + Umemoto (also known as RUR Architecture DPC) is an architecture firm based in New York City. The firm was co-founded by Jesse Reiser and Nanako Umemoto.

== Jesse Reiser ==
Jesse Reiser (born 1958) is an American architect and Professor of Architectural Design at Princeton University. Reiser received his Bachelor of Architecture degree from The Cooper Union and a Master of Architecture degree from the Cranbrook Academy of Art. In 1985 he was selected as a Fellow in Architecture of the American Academy in Rome. Prior to co-founding Reiser + Umemoto, he worked in the offices of John Hejduk and Aldo Rossi.

== Nanako Umemoto ==
Nanako Umemoto studied at the School of Landscape Architecture and Urban Design at the Osaka University of Arts before receiving a Bachelor of Architecture degree from The Cooper Union. She has taught architecture at Columbia University, University of Pennsylvania, Harvard University, Southern California Institute of Architecture, the Pratt Institute, and Hong Kong University.

== Recognition ==
The firm has been the recipient of numerous awards, including the Chrysler Design Award and the Academy Award in Architecture from the American Academy of Arts and Letters. Projects by the firm have received awards from the American Institute of Architects, including for O-14 (Dubai), a concrete exo-skeletal tower in Dubai. Reiser and Umemoto were awarded a Booth Fellowship from United States Artists in 2012 and their work is part of the collection at the Museum of Modern Art.

== Recent projects ==
- Taipei Music Center, (2020)
- Kaohsiung Port Cruise Terminal, (2023)
- O-14 (Dubai), 2009

== Publications ==
- Projects and Their Consequences, (Forthcoming), Reiser + Umemoto, Princeton Architectural Press
- O-14: Projection and Reception, 2012, Reiser + Umemoto, Architectural Association Publications
- Atlas of Novel Tectonics, 2006, Reiser + Umemoto, Princeton Architectural Press
- Reiser + Umemoto, 1998, Andrew Benjamin, Academy Editions
