= Kaohsiung Main Public Library =

Public library in Kaohsiung, Taiwan

- 高雄市立圖書館
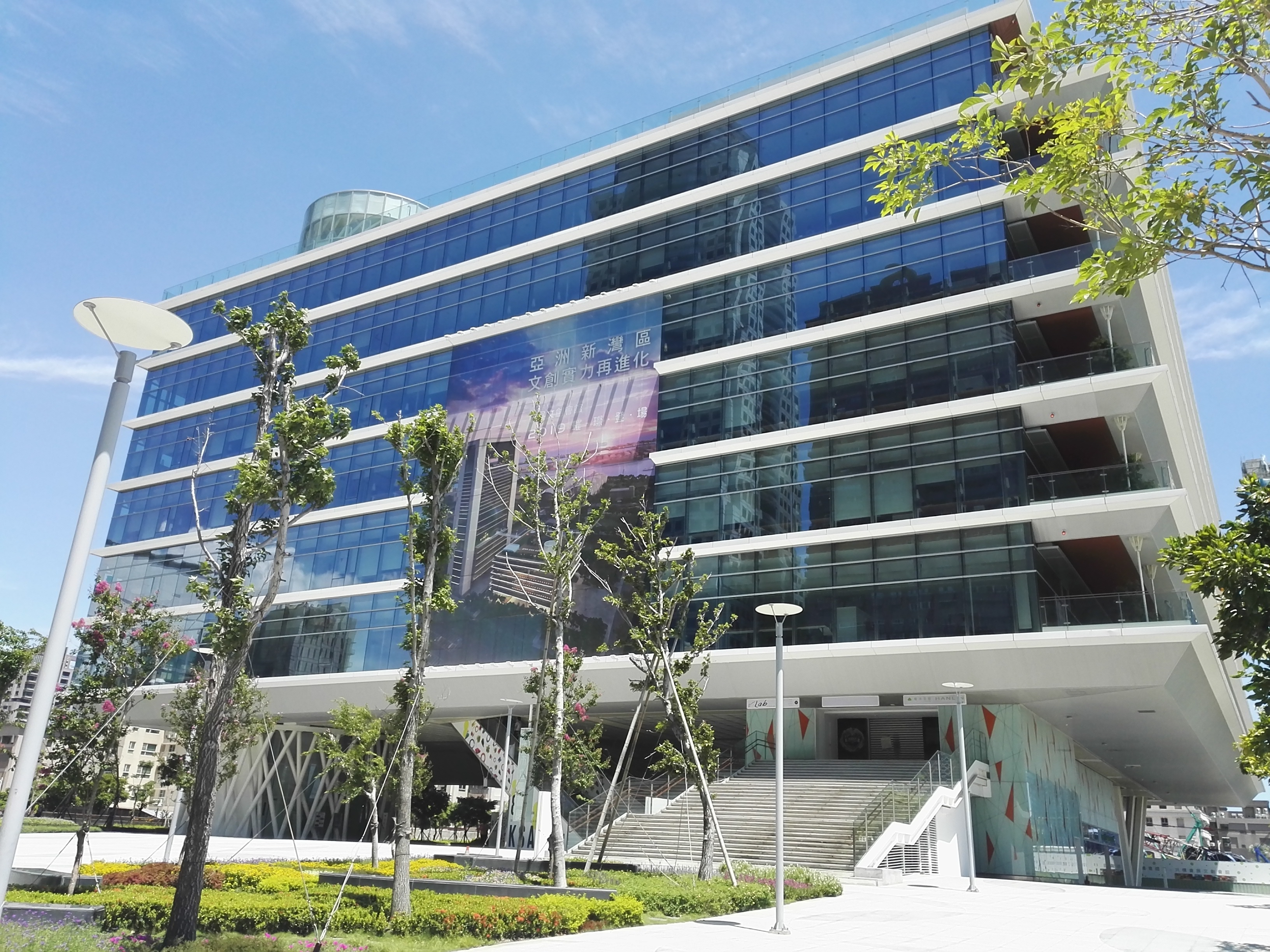
- 22.6102°N 120.3018°E
- Location: Kaohsiung, Taiwan
- Established: 2014 (current main library)
- Branches: 62

Other information
- Director: Cheng-Yi Pan
- Website: www.ksml.edu.tw

The Kaohsiung Main Public Library (Chinese: 高雄市立圖書館; pinyin: Gāoxióng Shìlì Túshūguǎn) is the central library of Kaohsiung, Taiwan. It is the main library of the Kaohsiung Public Library System and opened in November 2014. The building is located in Xinguang Road, opposite to the Tuntex Sky Tower.

== History ==
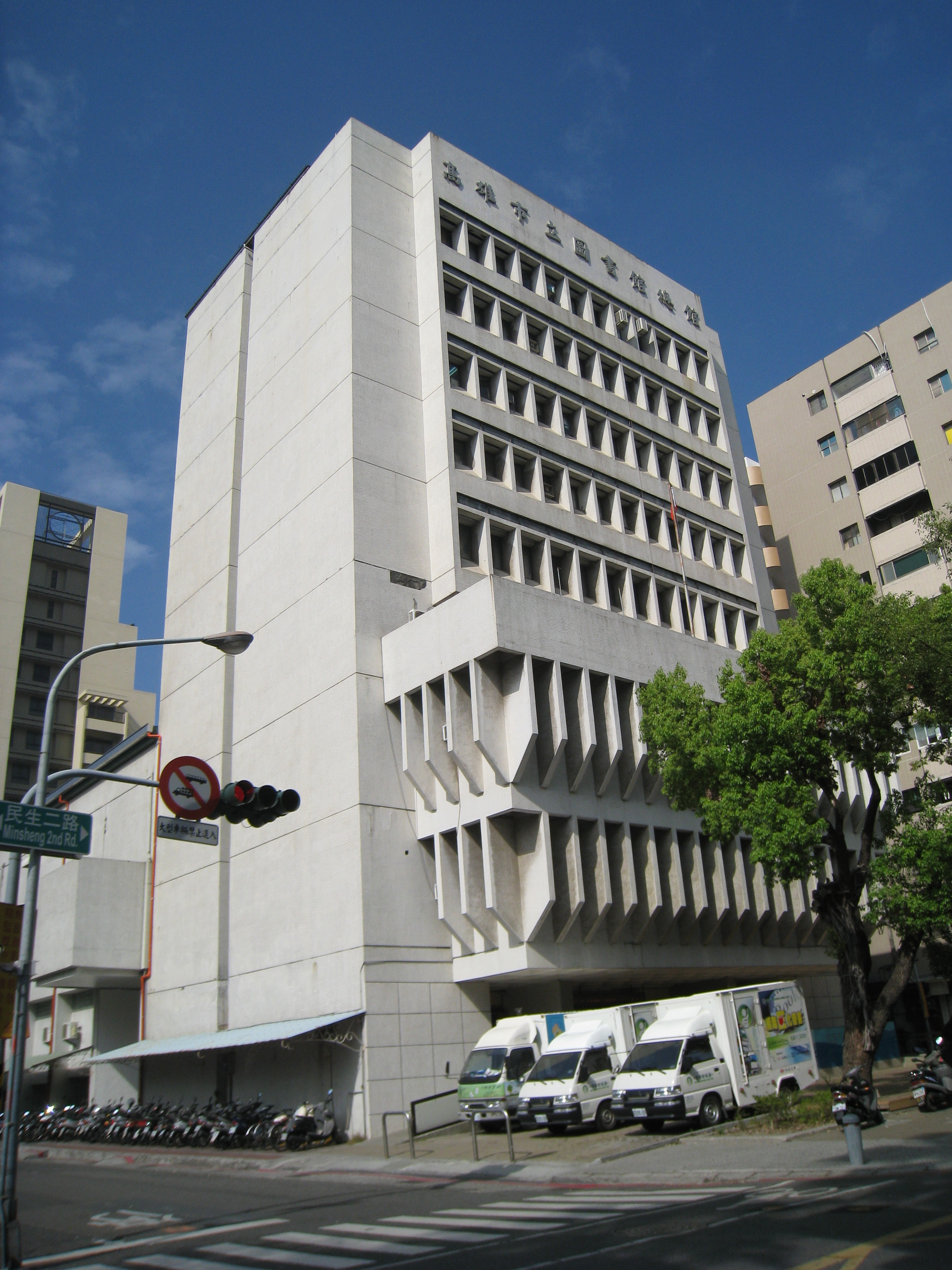
Old main library of Kaohsiung at Minsheng Road.

The old main library of Kaohsiung at Minsheng Road opened in 1981. By 2011, it had gradually become unable to keep up with the demand of the public, and a project was initiated to build a new library building in the Asia New Bay Area, located in the city center. Architecture and design work were done by Ricky Liu and the Japanese architect Toyo Ito’s team. Construction started in October 2012 and was completed in 2014. Opening to the public in November of that year, it was hailed as a new cultural landmark for the city.

In 2017 the library was regarded as one of the top 10 landmarks of Taiwan by TripAdvisor.

== Features ==
The library has an area of 38,000 m^{2} (410,000 sq ft) over eight floors, with no columns inside the building. On the top floor it has integrated a subtropical garden landscape into its architecture. It is regarded as the world’s first column-suspended green building.

=== Gallery ===
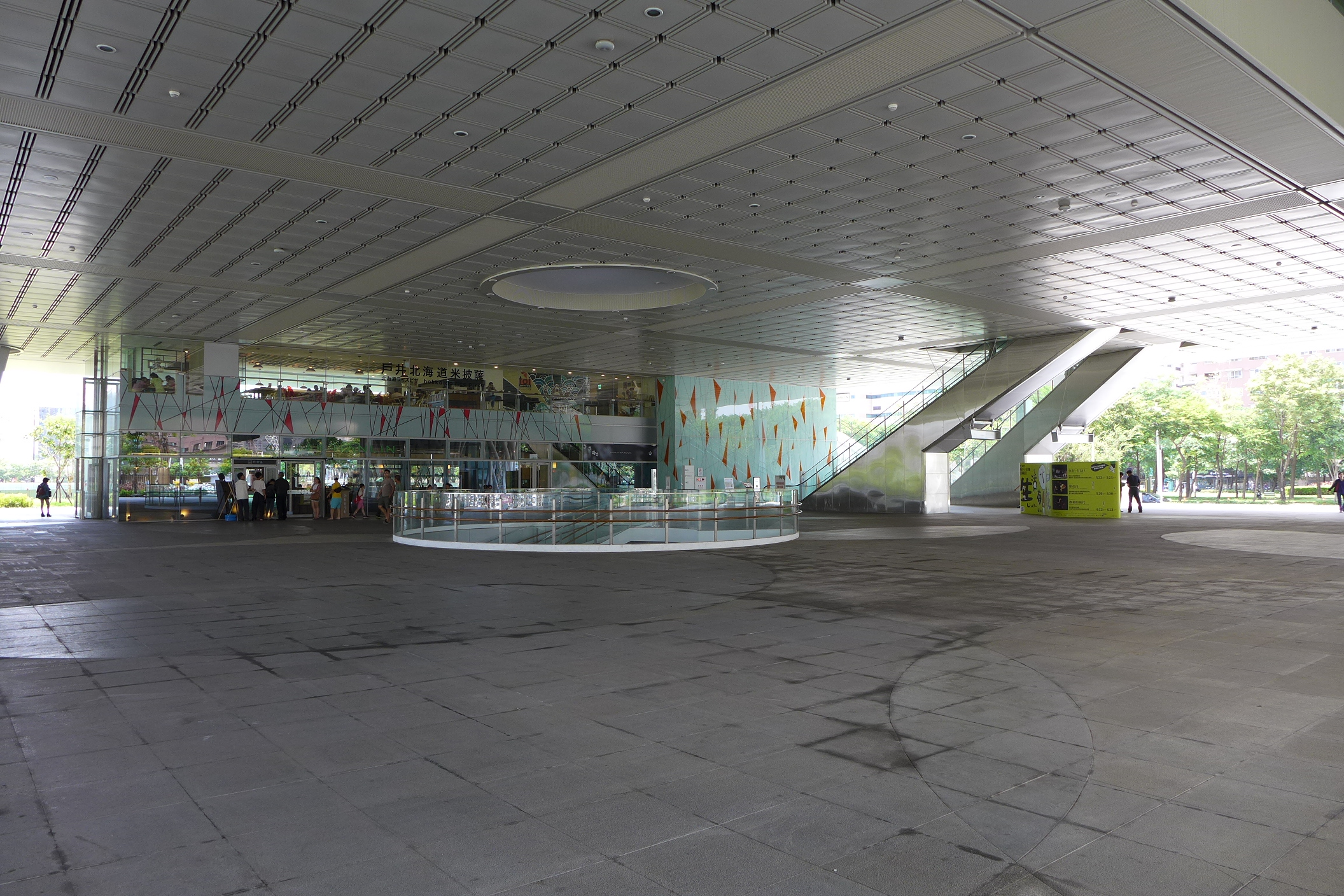
Ground floor main hall

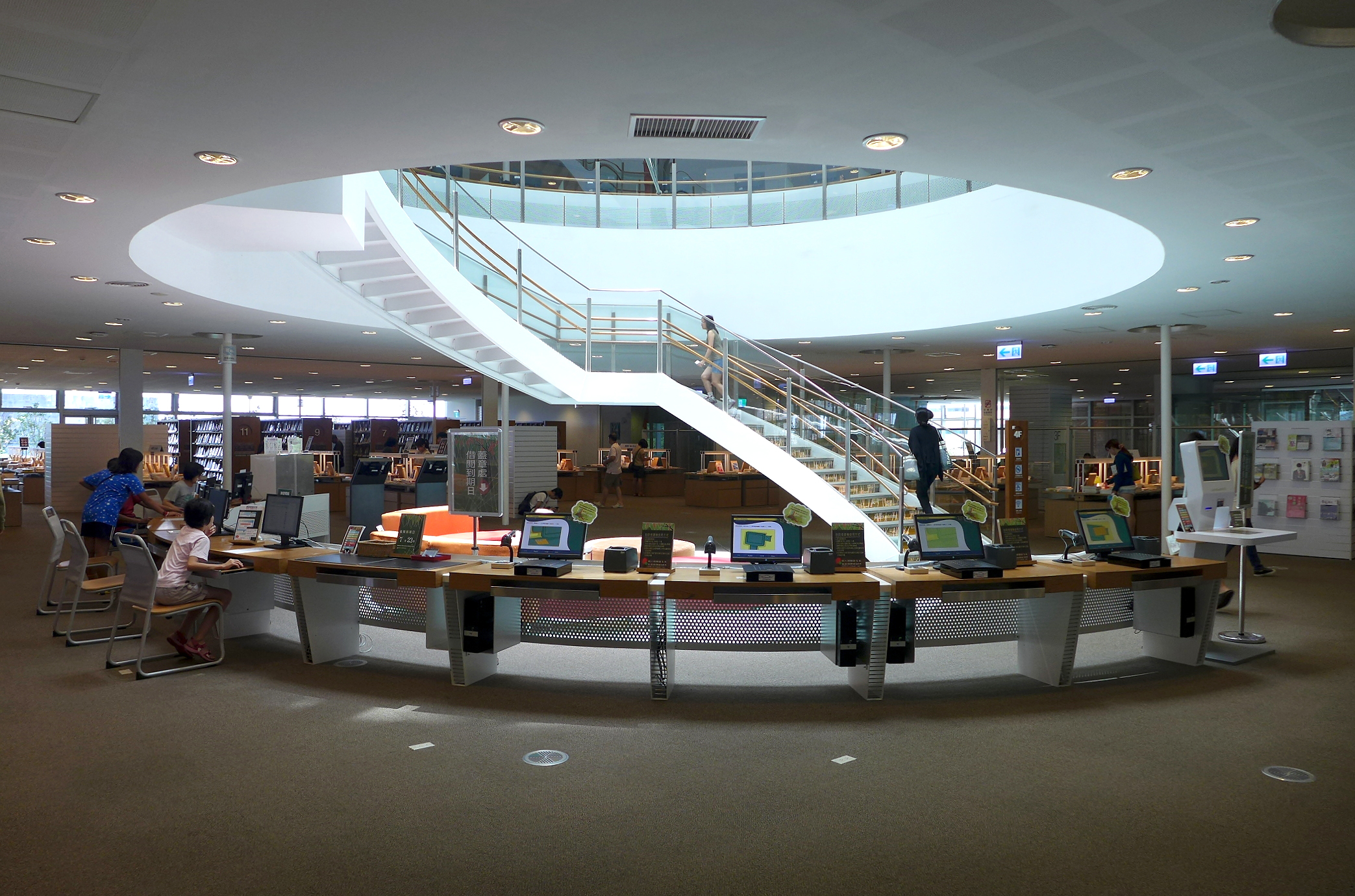
Level 3 Mezzanine

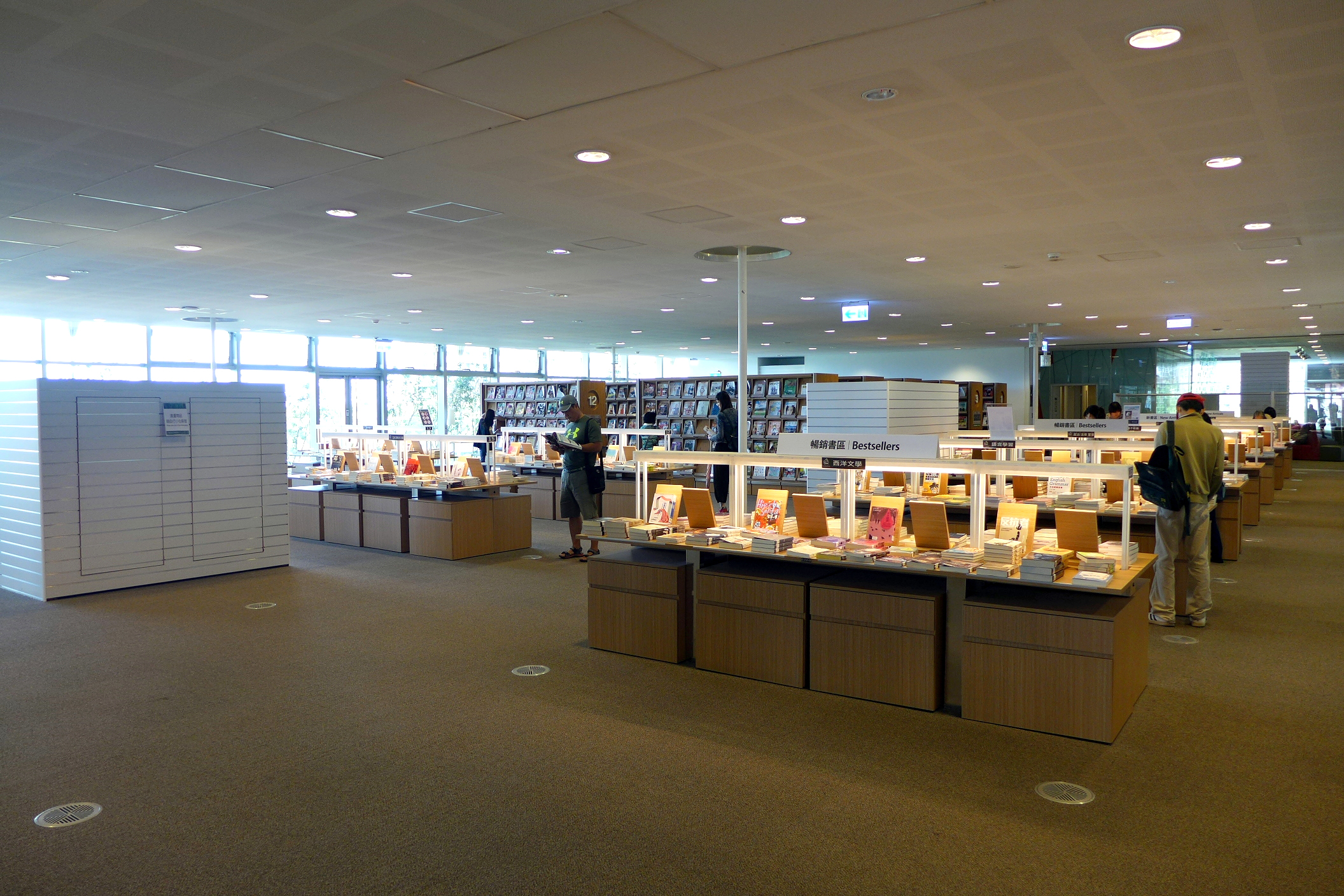
New books area

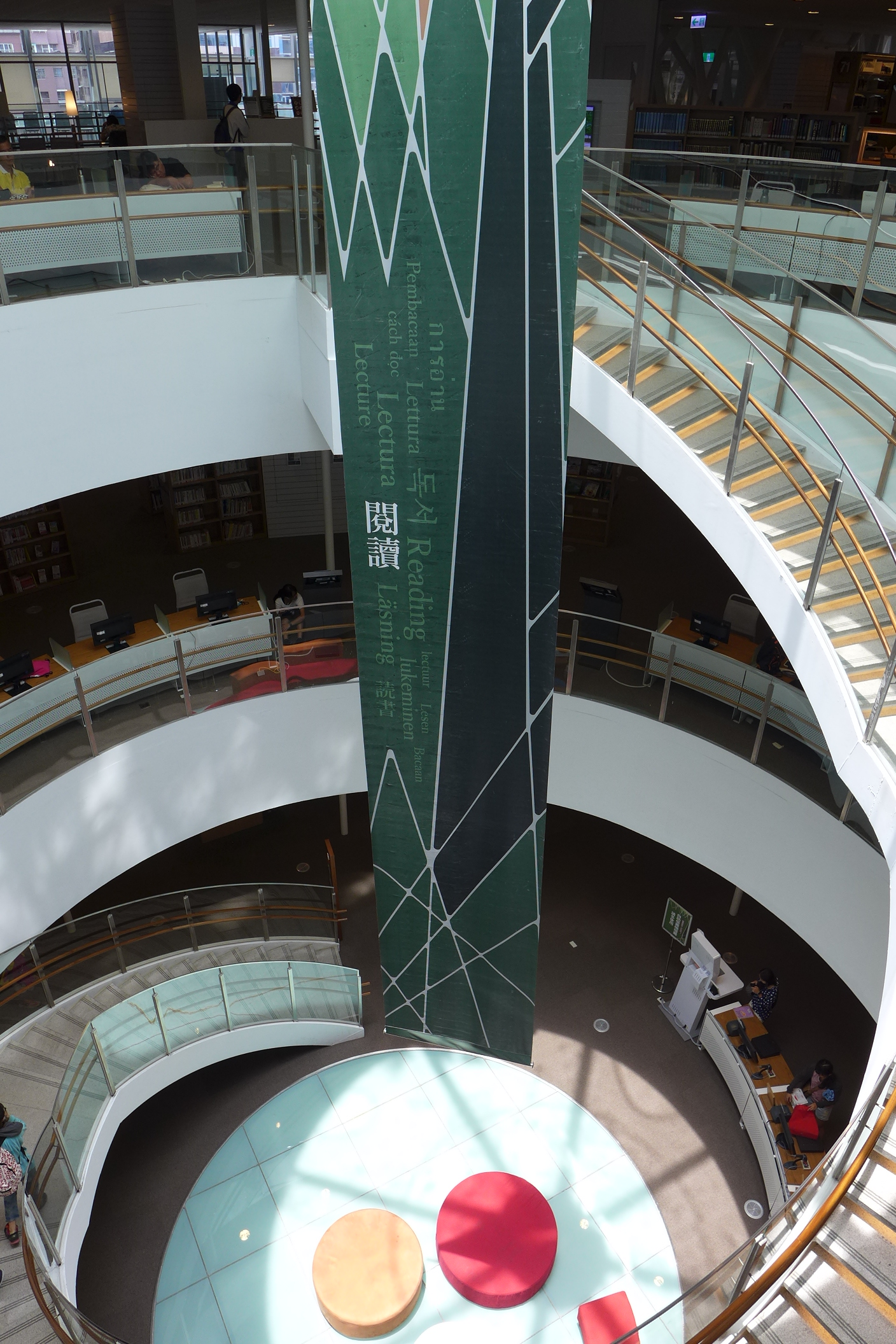
Void

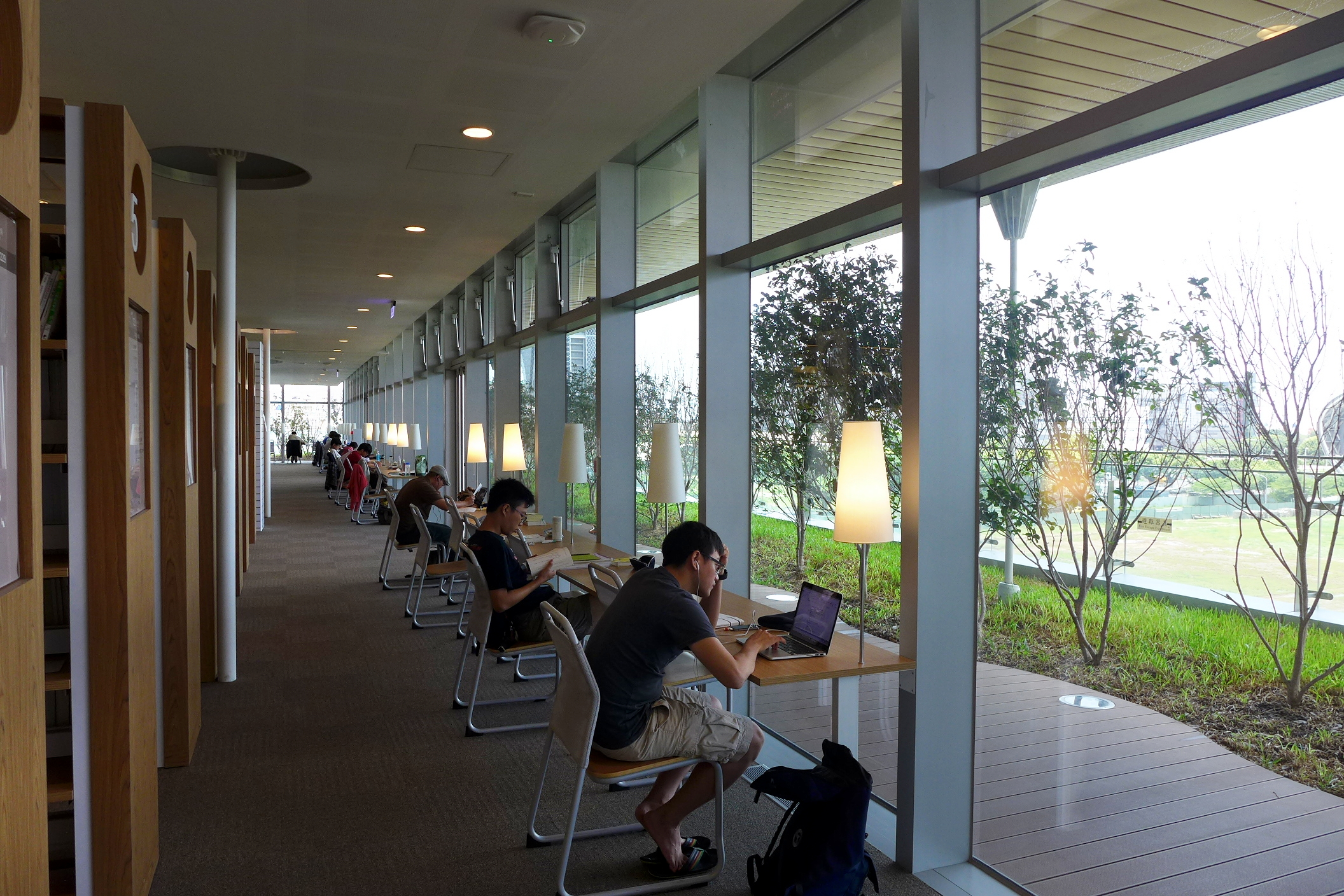
Level 4 Study Area

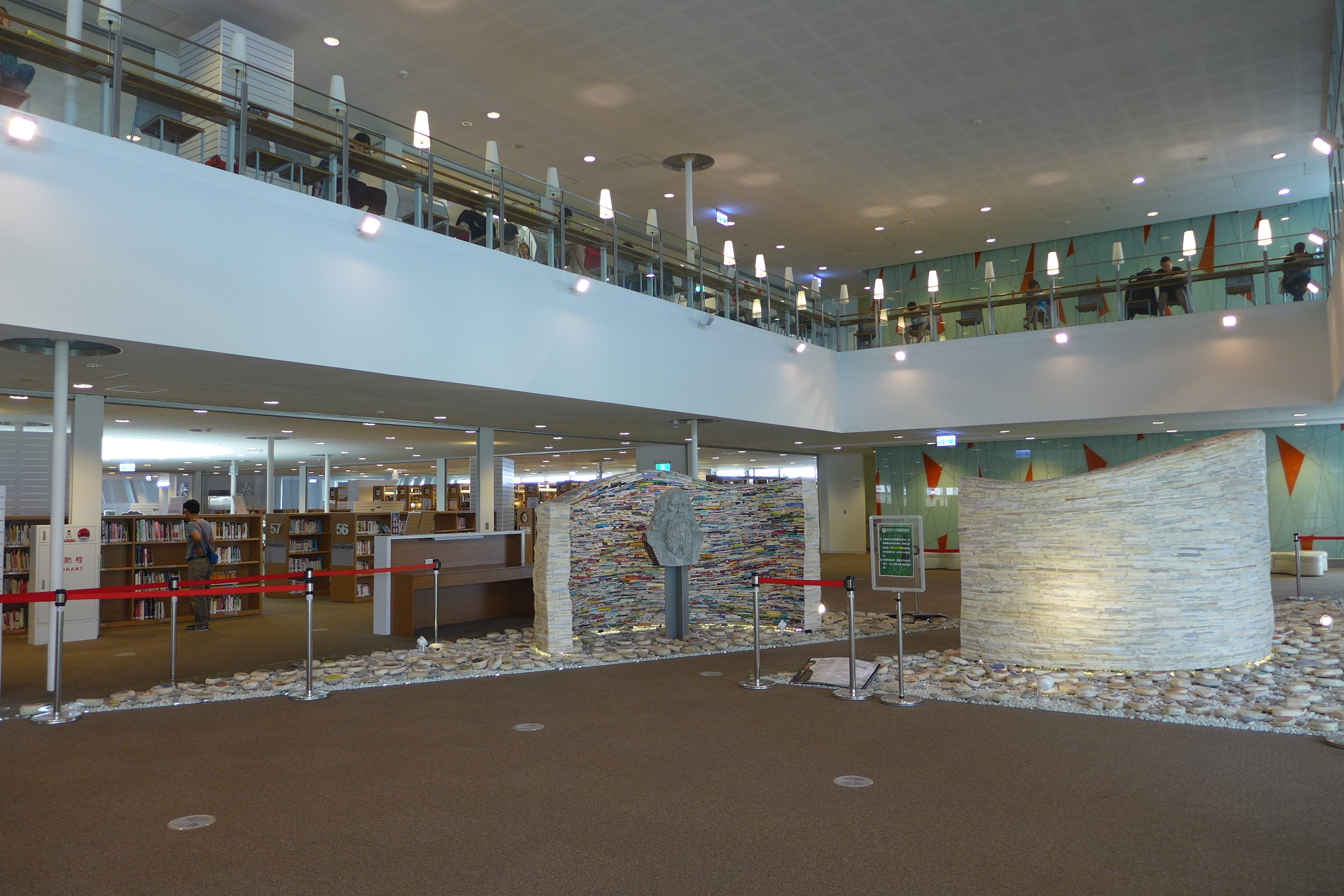
Level 4 Exhibition Hall

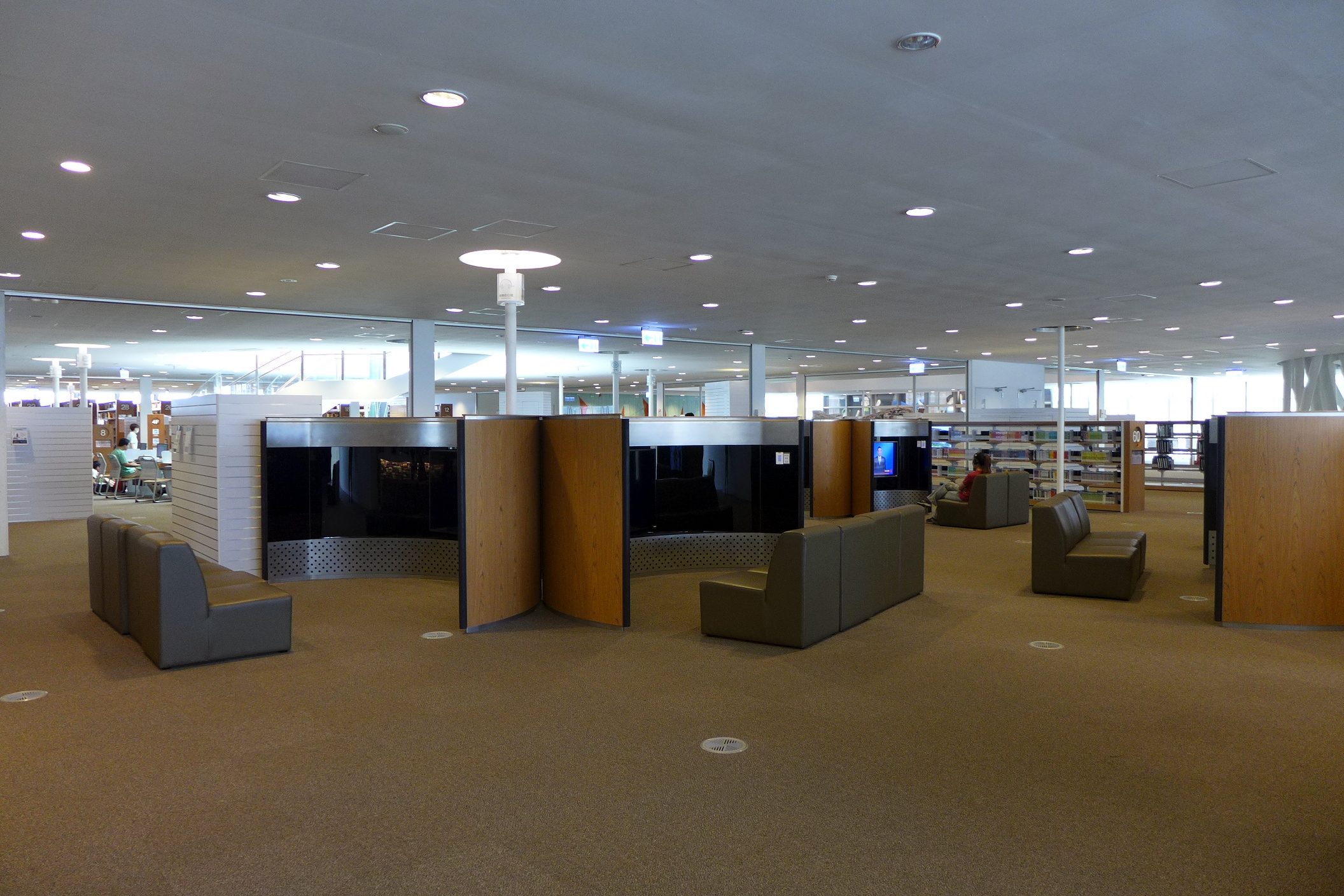
Level 5 Multimedia Theatre

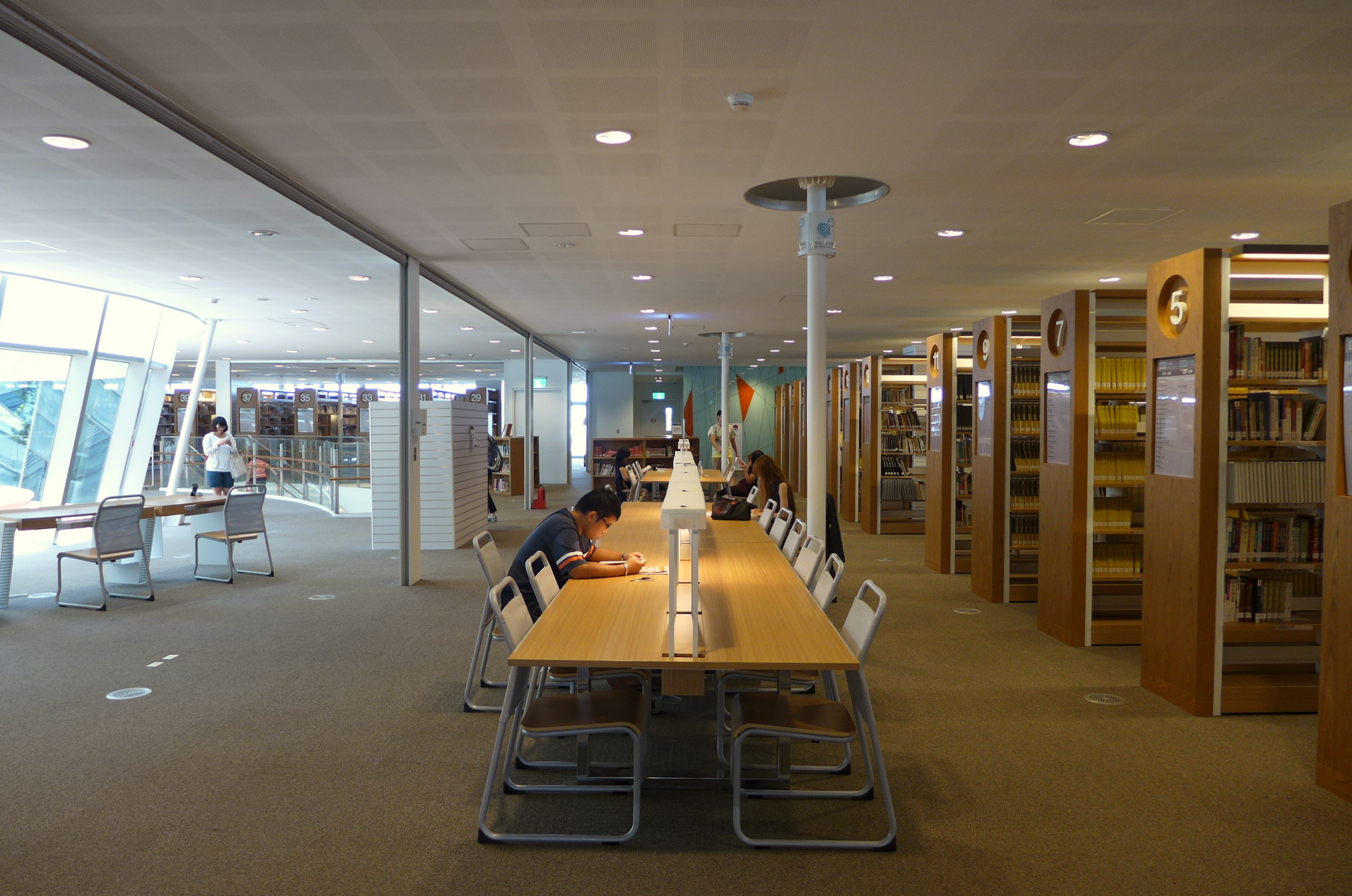
Level 6

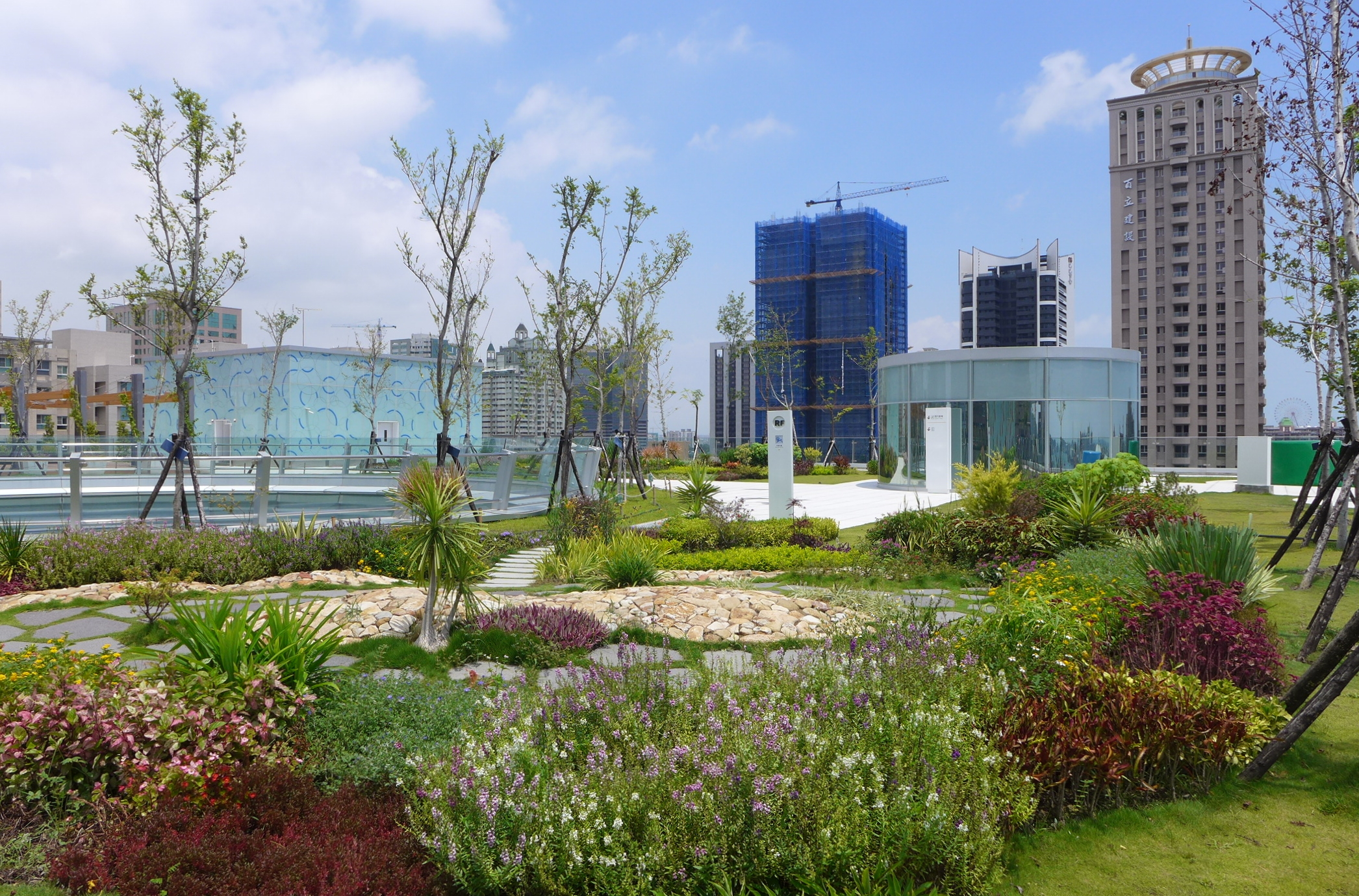
Rooftop garden

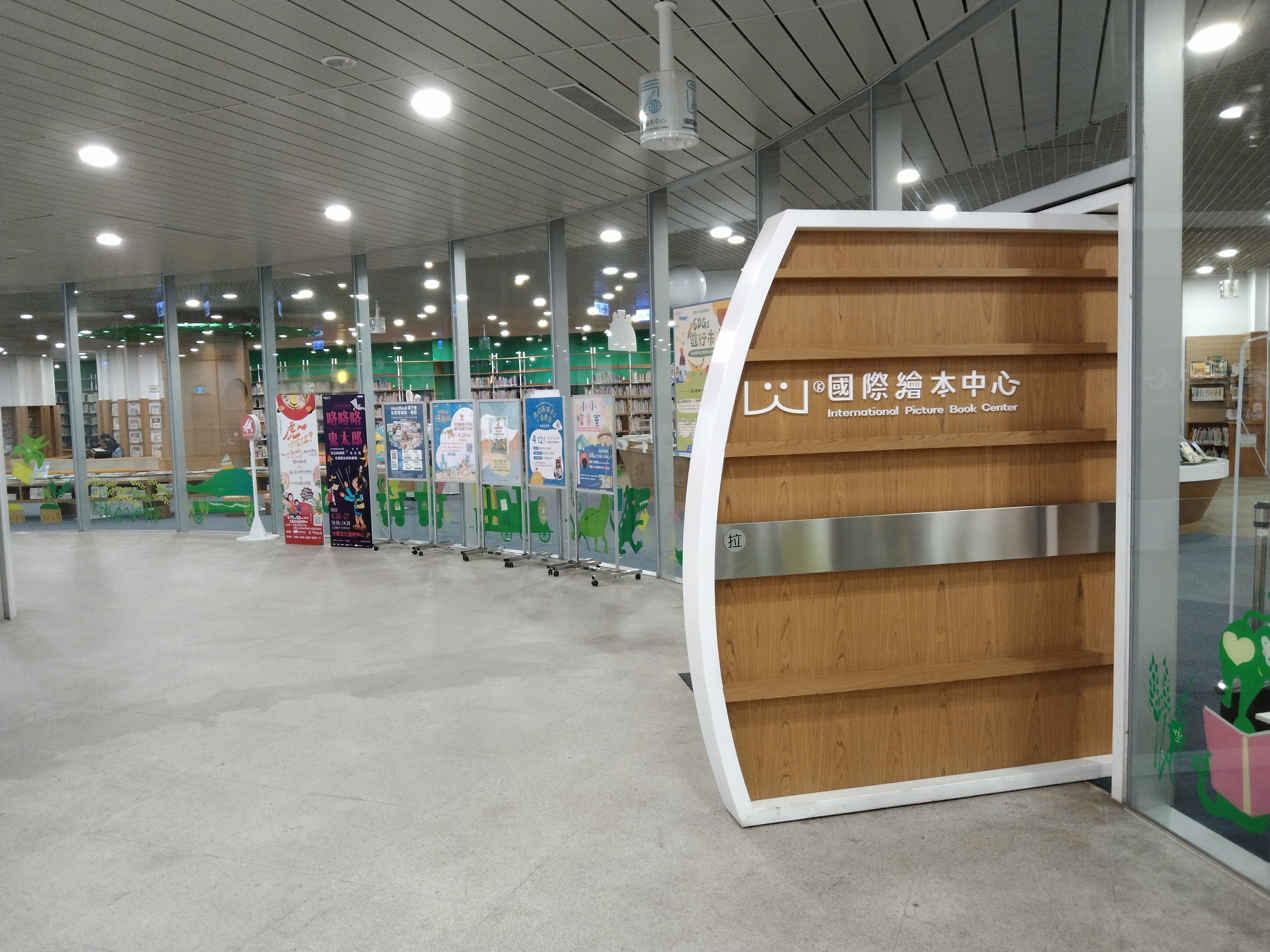
International Picture Book Center

== Phase II ==
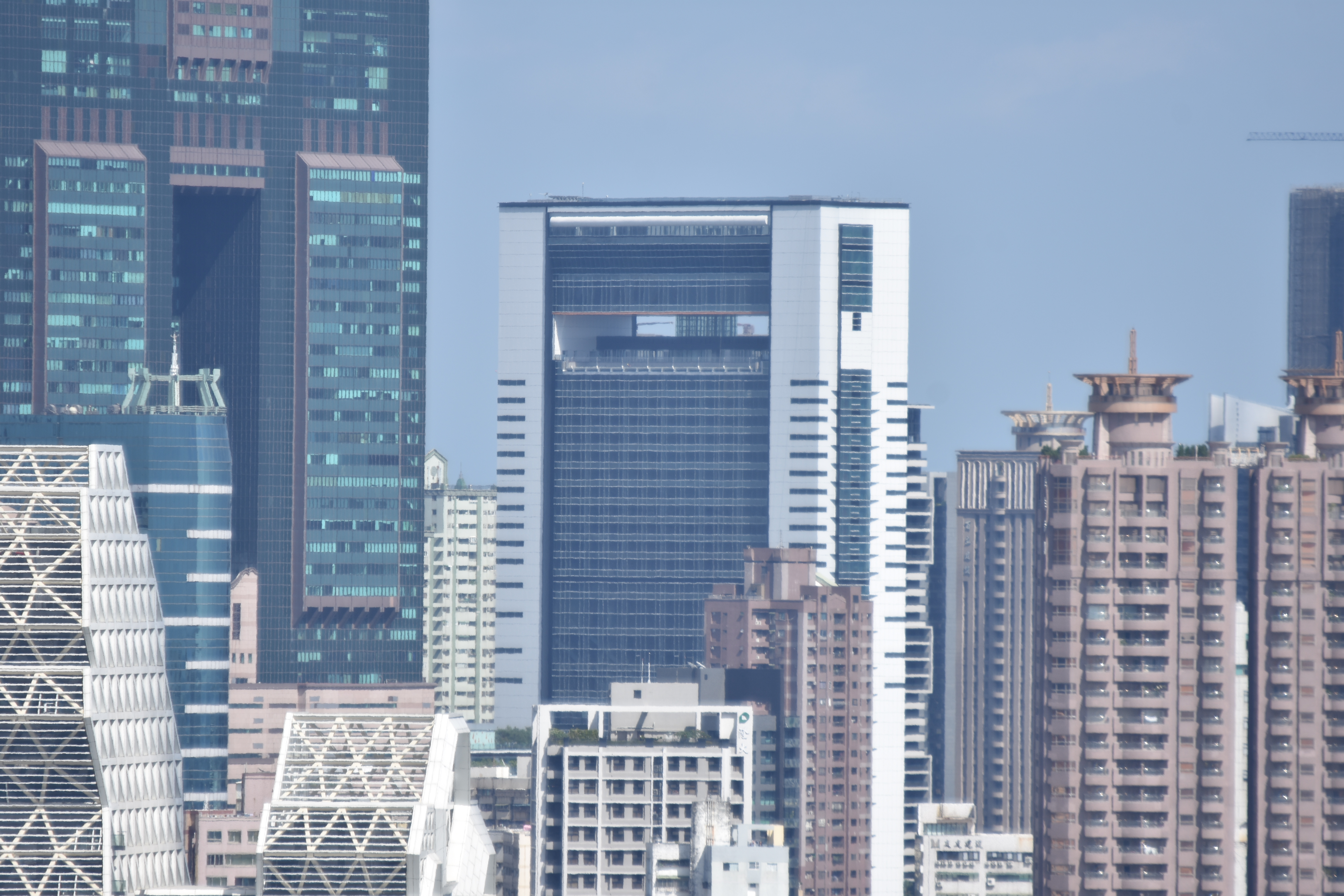
Phase II building from afar

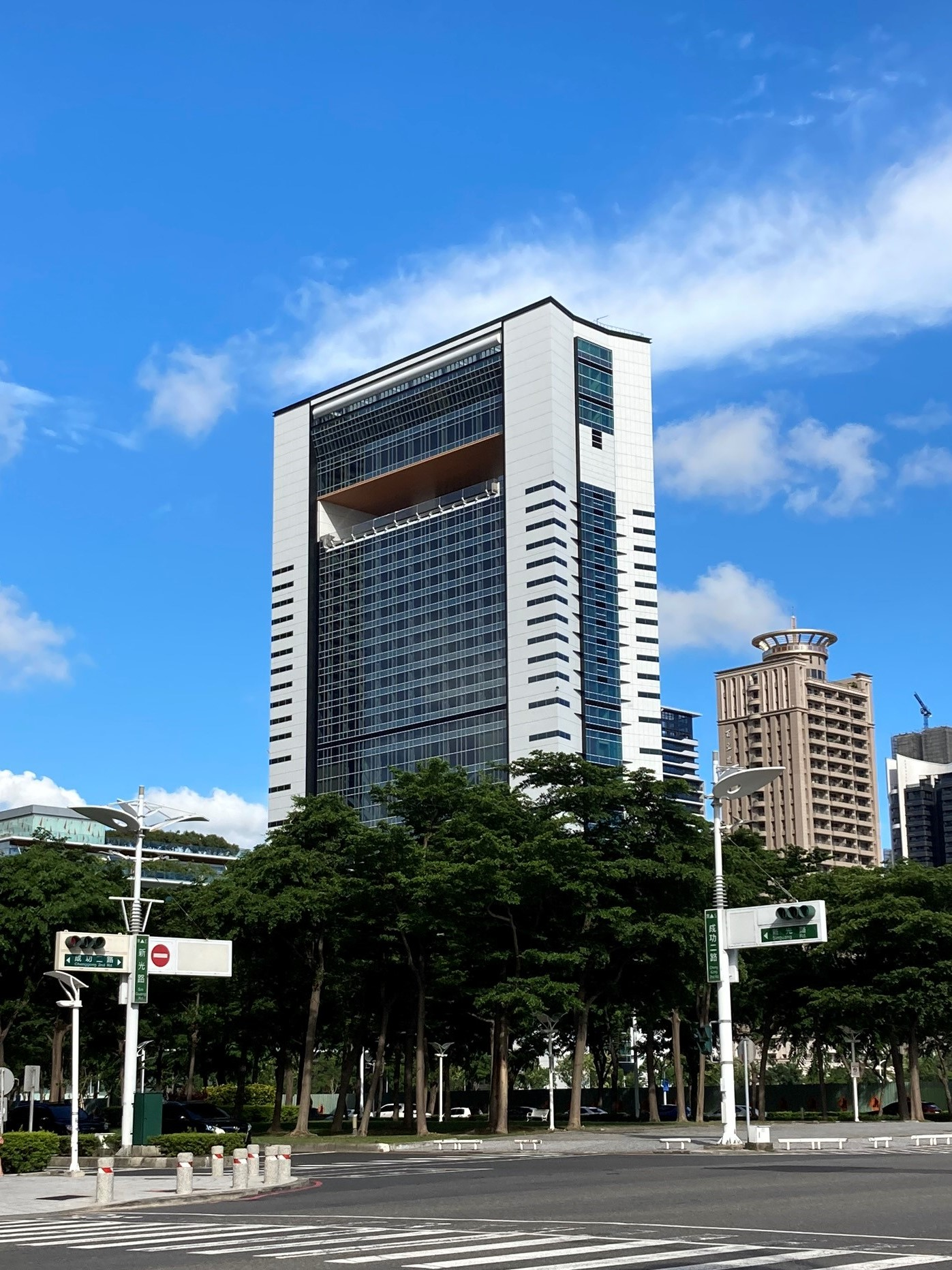
Phase II building

The second phase of the development plan started in 2016 and was completed in 2020. It comprises a 148 m (486 ft)-tall skyscraper with 27 floors above ground and six basement levels, and a floor area of approximately 42,000 m^{2} (450,000 sq ft).

The building includes a bookstore, restaurant, movie theater and a 238-room hotel. This BOT project accounts for the operating costs of the new library in the future, and provides accommodation and research facilities in the adjacent Kaohsiung Exhibition Center to form a cultural and creative industry cluster and create a cultural and creative industry in Kaohsiung.
