= O-14 (Dubai) =

Coordinates: 25°10′51″N 55°16′11″E

- Interactive map of the O-14 area

General information
- Type: Office
- Location: Dubai, United Arab Emirates
- Construction started: 2007
- Completed: 2009

Height
- Roof: 105.7 m (347 ft)

Technical details
- Floor count: 24
- Floor area: 300,000 sq ft (28,000 m^{2})

Design and construction
- Architect: Reiser + Umemoto RUR Architecture P.C.

O14 or O-14 is an office skyscraper located in Business Bay in Dubai, United Arab Emirates. It is 105.7 m (347 ft) tall and has 24 floors. The building's floor area is 300,000 sq ft (28,000 m^{2}). There is a 1-meter space between the facade and the windows which allows hot air to rise and cool air to come in from below. The facade is 40 cm thick and made of an extremely fluid concrete. It has 1300 circular openings of various sizes. The building is held up by the core and exoskeleton so the space inside is largely column free. O-14 is the winner of the 2009 Silver, Emporis Skyscraper Award. O-14 also won the 2010 ACEC National Honor Award for Excellence in Engineering Design. O-14 was the recipient of the best tall building in Middle East and Africa in the best tall buildings awards by Council on Tall Buildings and Urban Habitat.

== See also ==
- Business Bay
- List of tallest buildings in Dubai
