= Kaisyuan Jhonghua light rail station =

Light rail station in Kaohsiung, Taiwan

Coordinates: 22.5937°N 120.3105°E

Kaisyuan Jhonghua C4 凱旋中華站
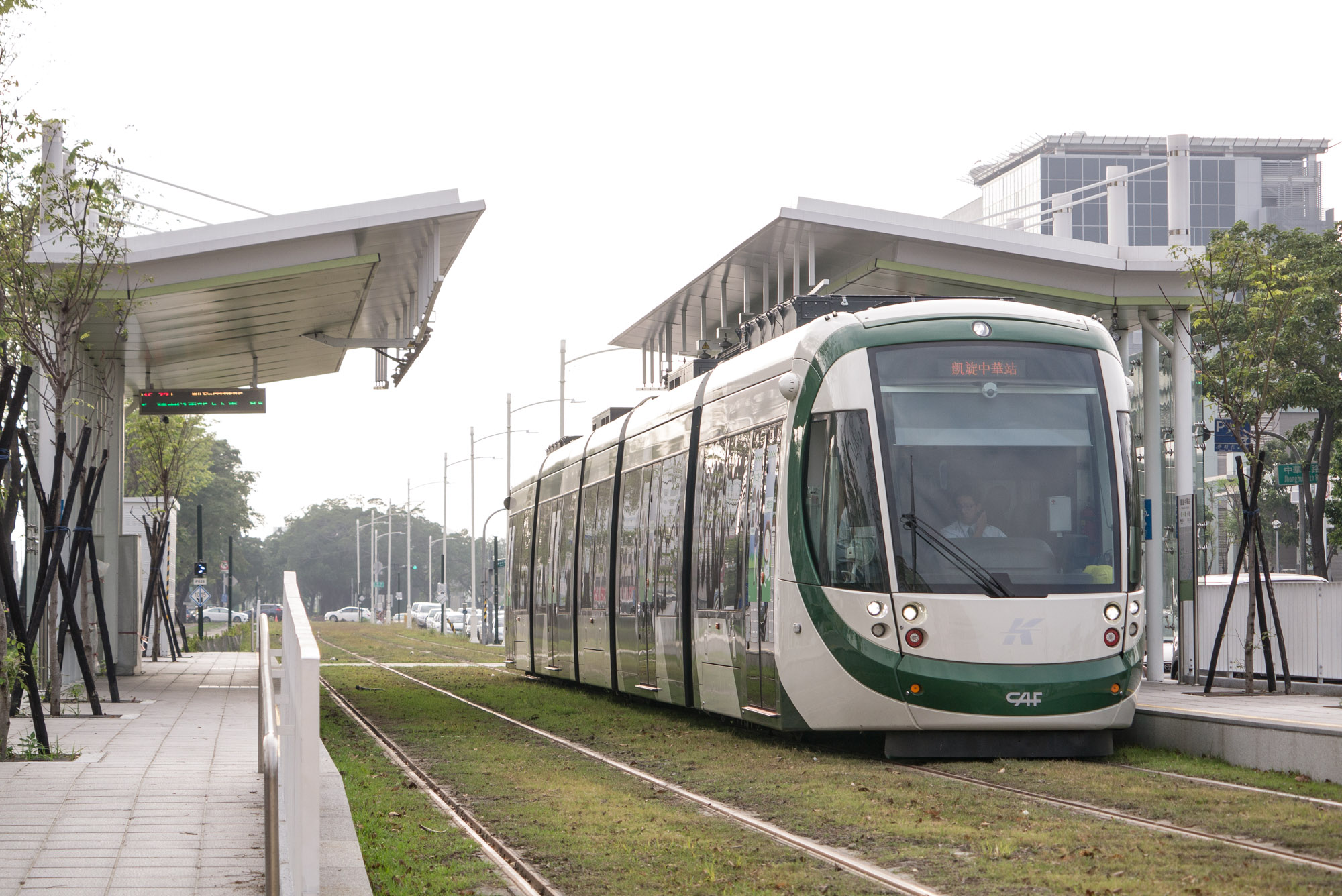

General information
- Location: Cianjhen, Kaohsiung; Taiwan
- Operated by: Kaohsiung Rapid Transit Corporation
- Line: Circular line
- Platforms: 2 side platforms
- Connections: Bus stop

Construction
- Structure type: At-grade
- Accessible: Yes

Other information
- Station code: C4

History
- Opened: October 16, 2015

Services
Preceding station	Kaohsiung Metro	Following station
Cianjhen Star outer loop / anticlockwise	Circular light rail	Dream Mall inner loop / clockwise
Location

Kaisyuan Jhonghua station (Chinese: 凱旋中華站; Hanyu Pinyin: Kǎixuán Zhōnghuá Zhàn; Tongyong Pinyin: Kǎisyuán Jhonghuá Jhàn) is a light rail station of the Circular line of the Kaohsiung rapid transit system. It is located in Cianjhen District, Kaohsiung, Taiwan.

== Station overview ==
This is a street-level station with two side platforms. It is located at the junction of Jhonghua 5th Road and Kaisyuan 4th Road.

== Station layout ==
Street level	Side platform
Street level	← Circular light rail toward Hamasen (Dream Mall)
Street level	→ Circular light rail toward Lizihnei (Cianjhen Star)
Street level	Side platform

== Around the station ==
- Workforce Development Agency (Kaohsiung-Pingtung-Penghu-Taitung Regional Branch)
- Qianzhen Triangle Park
- Fire Bureau, Kaohsiung City Government
