= Dream Mall light rail station =

Light rail station in Kaohsiung, Taiwan

Coordinates: 22.5948°N 120.3050°E

Dream Mall C5 夢時代
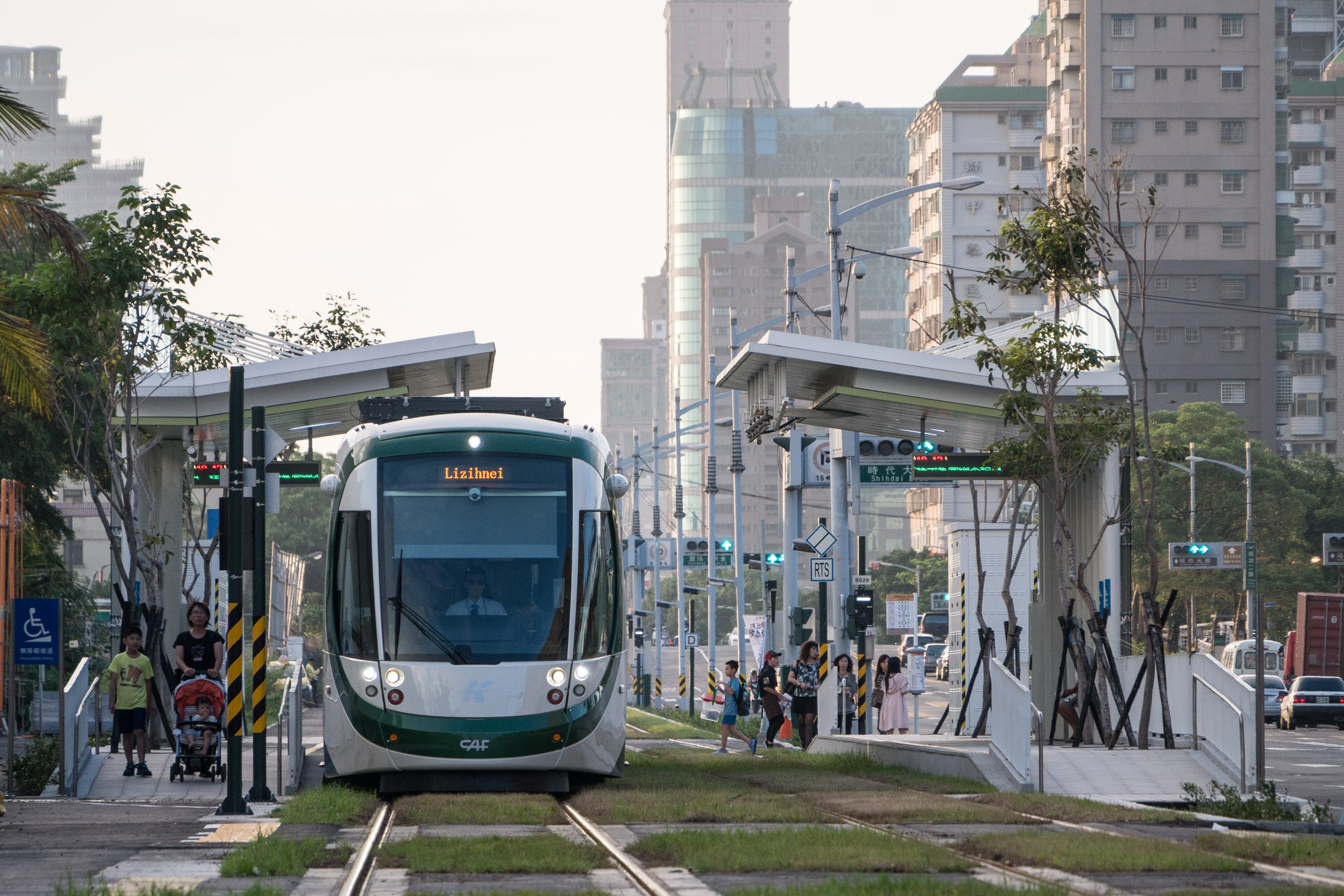
- A tram at Dream Mall station

General information
- Location: Cianjhen, Kaohsiung; Taiwan
- Operated by: Kaohsiung Rapid Transit Corporation
- Line: Circular line
- Platforms: 2 side platforms
- Connections: Bus stop

Construction
- Structure type: At grade
- Accessible: Yes

Other information
- Station code: C5

History
- Opened: October 16, 2015

Services
| Preceding station | Kaohsiung Metro | Following station |
|---|---|---|
| Kaisyuan Jhonghua outer loop / anticlockwise | Circular light rail | Commerce and Trade Park inner loop / clockwise |
Location

Dream Mall station (Chinese: 夢時代站; pinyin: Mèngshídài) is a light rail station of the Circular Line of the Kaohsiung rapid transit system. It is located in Cianjhen District, Kaohsiung, Taiwan.

== Station overview ==
This is a street-level station with two side platforms. It is located at the junction of Shihdai Blvd and Chenggong 2nd Road, beside Dream Mall, a large shopping center.

== Station layout ==
| Street level | Side platform |
| Street level | ← Circular light rail toward Hamasen (Commerce and Trade Park) |
| Street level | → Circular light rail toward Lizihnei (Kaisyuan Jhonghua) |
| Street level | Side platform |

== Around the station ==
- Dream Mall
- Kaohsiung, Taiwan Sugar Logistics Park
- Qianzhen Triangle Park
