= Commerce and Trade Park light rail station =

Light rail station in Kaohsiung, Taiwan

Coordinates: 22.6010°N 120.3026°E

Commerce and Trade Park C6 經貿園區站
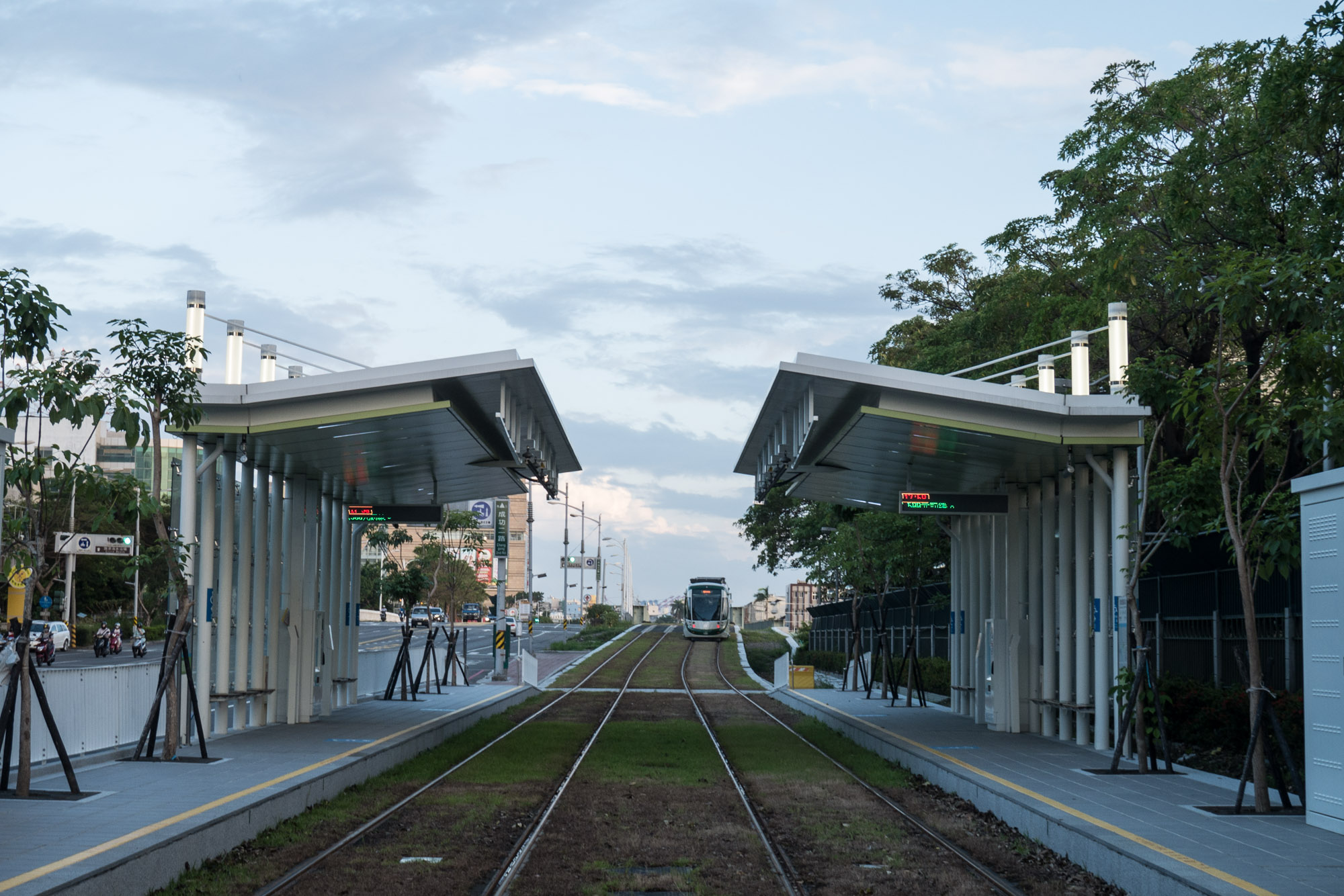

General information
- Location: Cianjhen, Kaohsiung; Taiwan
- Operated by: Kaohsiung Rapid Transit Corporation
- Line: Circular line
- Platforms: 2 side platforms
- Connections: Bus stop

Construction
- Structure type: At grade
- Accessible: Yes

Other information
- Station code: C6

History
- Opened: October 16, 2015

Services
Preceding station	Kaohsiung Metro	Following station
Dream Mall outer loop / anticlockwise	Circular light rail	Software Technology Park inner loop / clockwise
Location

Commerce and Trade Park (Chinese: 經貿園區站; pinyin: Jīngmàoyuánqū) is a light rail station of the Circular Line of the Kaohsiung rapid transit system. It is located in Cianjhen District, Kaohsiung, Taiwan.

== Station overview ==
This is a street-level station with two side platforms. It is located at the junction of Jhengcin Road and Chenggong 2nd Road.

== Station layout ==
Street level	Side platform
Street level	← Circular light rail toward Hamasen (Software Technology Park)
Street level	→ Circular light rail toward Lizihnei (Dream Mall)
Street level	Side platform

== Around the station ==
- Taipower South Area Power Plant
