= Kaohsiung Exhibition Center light rail station =

Light rail station in Kaohsiung, Taiwan

Coordinates: 22.6101°N 120.2980°E

Kaohsiung Exhibition Center C8 高雄展覽館站
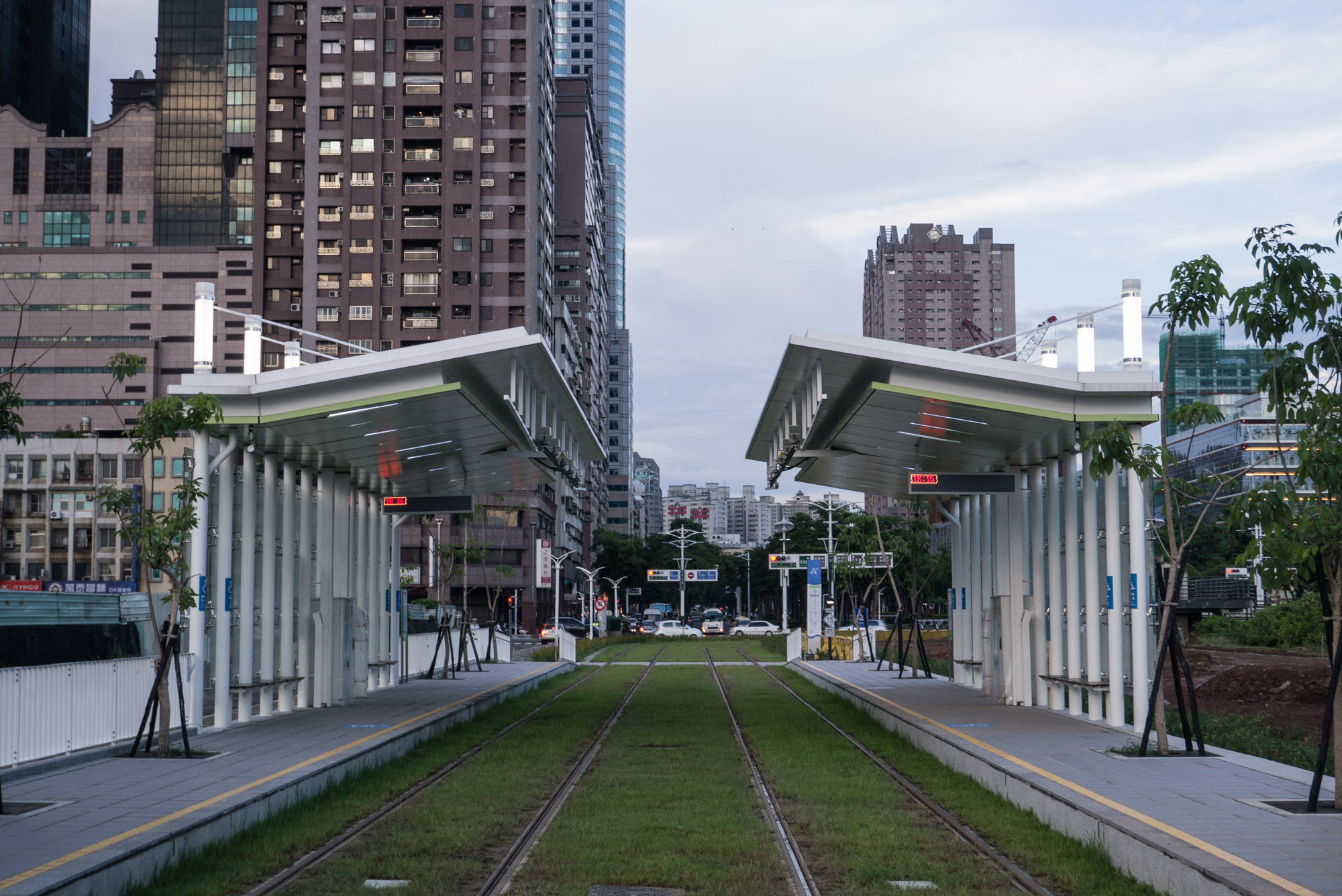

General information
- Location: Lingya, Kaohsiung; Taiwan
- Operated by: Kaohsiung Rapid Transit Corporation
- Line: Circular line
- Platforms: 2 side platforms
- Connections: Bus stop

Construction
- Structure type: At grade
- Accessible: Yes

Other information
- Station code: C8

History
- Opened: October 16, 2015

Services
Preceding station	Kaohsiung Metro	Following station
Software Technology Park outer loop / anticlockwise	Circular light rail	Cruise Terminal inner loop / clockwise
Location

Kaohsiung Exhibition Center (Chinese: 高雄展覽館站; pinyin: Gāoxíong Zhǎnlǎnguǎn) is a light rail station of the Circular line of the Kaohsiung rapid transit system. It is located in Lingya District, Kaohsiung, Taiwan.

== Station overview ==
This is a street-level station with two side platforms. It is located within Singuang Ferry Wharf beside the Kaohsiung Exhibition Center.

== Station layout ==
Street level	Side platform
Street level	← Circular light rail toward Hamasen (Cruise Terminal)
Street level	→ Circular light rail toward Lizihnei (Software Technology Park)
Street level	Side platform

== Around the station ==
- Kaohsiung Exhibition Center
- Xinguang Riverside Park
- Singuang Ferry Wharf
- Horizon City Marina
- Kaohsiung Port Pier 21
- Kaohsiung Main Public Library
- 85 Sky Tower
