= Software Technology Park light rail station =

Light rail station in Kaohsiung, Taiwan

Coordinates: 22.6057°N 120.3010°E

Software Technology Park C7 軟體園區站
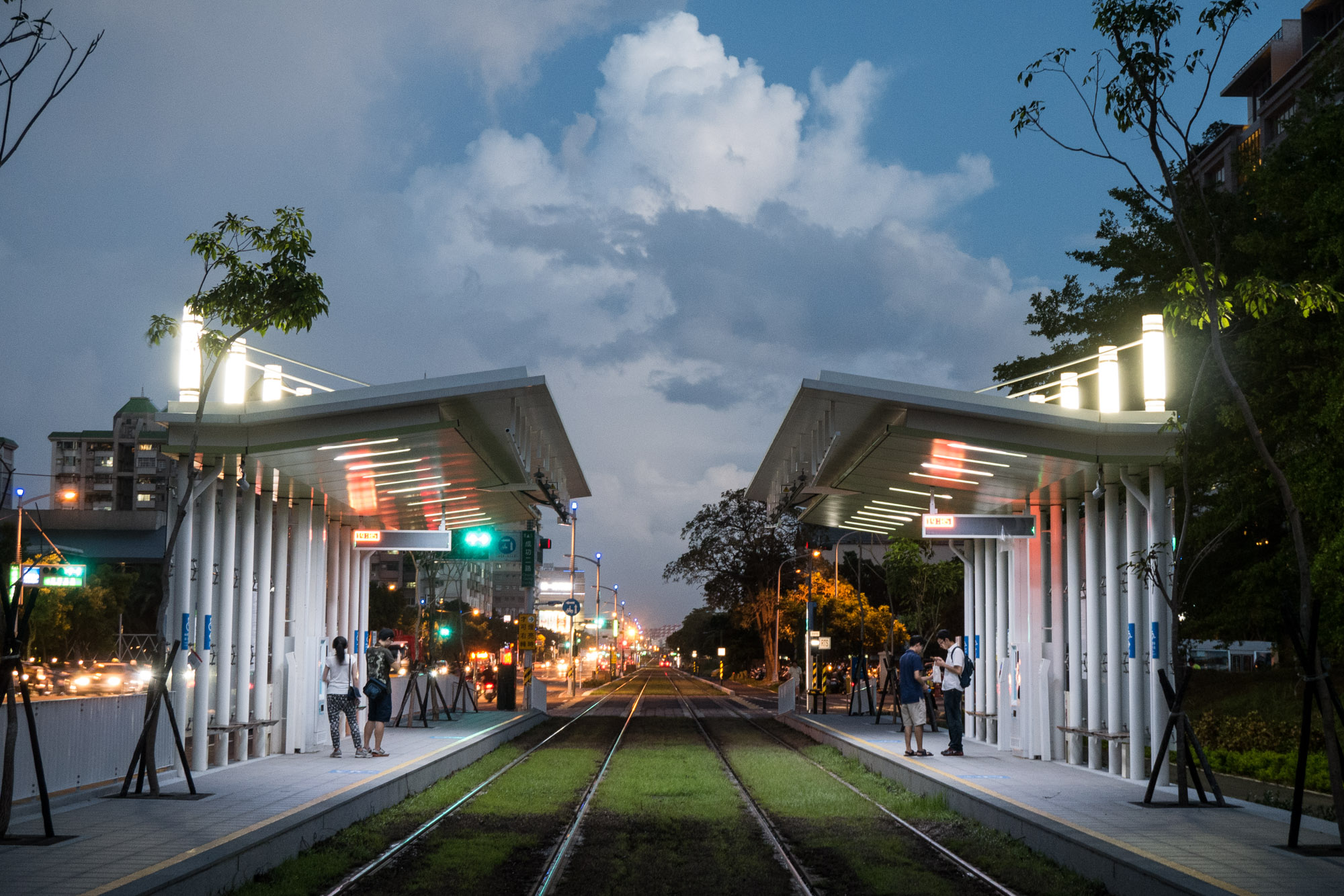

General information
- Location: Cianjhen, Kaohsiung; Taiwan
- Operated by: Kaohsiung Rapid Transit Corporation
- Line: Circular line
- Platforms: 2 side platforms
- Connections: Bus stop

Construction
- Structure type: At grade
- Accessible: Yes

Other information
- Station code: C7

History
- Opened: October 16, 2015

Services
Preceding station	Kaohsiung Metro	Following station
Commerce and Trade Park outer loop / anticlockwise	Circular light rail	Kaohsiung Exhibition Center inner loop / clockwise
Location

Software Technology Park (Chinese: 軟體園區站; pinyin: Ruǎntǐyuánqū) is a light rail station of the Circular line of the Kaohsiung rapid transit system. It is located in Cianjhen District, Kaohsiung, Taiwan.

== Station overview ==
This is a street-level station with two side platforms. It is located at the junction of Fusing 3rd Road and Chenggong 2nd Road.

== Station layout ==
Street level	Side platform
Street level	← Circular light rail toward Hamasen (Kaohsiung Exhibition Center)
Street level	→ Circular light rail toward Lizihnei (Commerce and Trade Park)
Street level	Side platform

== Around the station ==
- Kaohsiung Software Park
- American Institute in Taiwan Kaohsiung Branch Office
- China Steel Corporation Headquarters
- Chenggong School of Special Education
- IKEA Kaohsiung
- Carrefour Chenggong Store
