= Software Technology Park =

Software Technology Park may refer to:

- Software Technology Parks of India
- Software Technology Park light rail station
- Arfa Software Technology Park
