= Shihjia metro station =

Metro station in Kaohsiung, Taiwan

Shihjia R7 獅甲
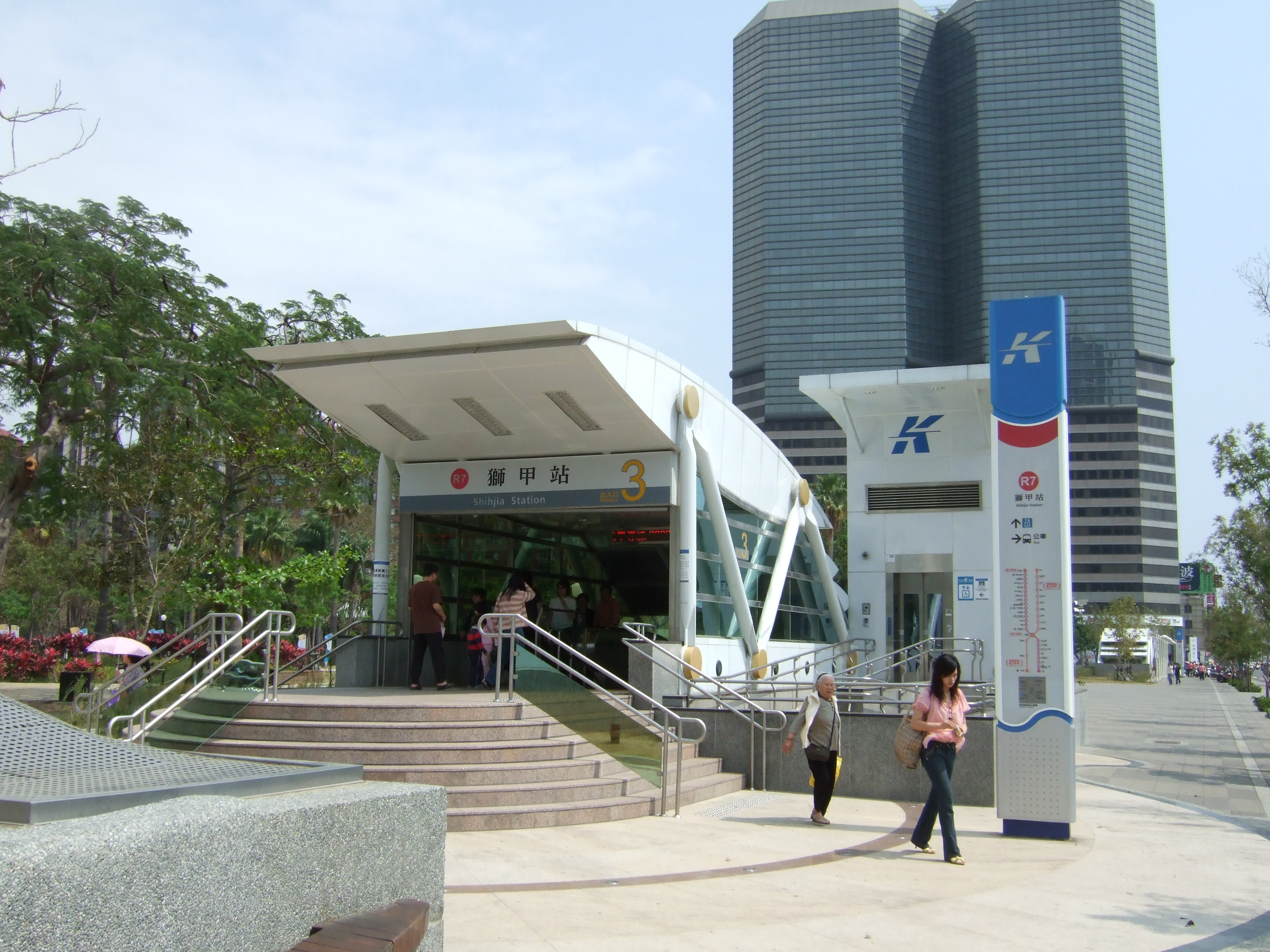
- Shihjia station exit 3

Chinese name
- Traditional Chinese: 獅甲車站
- Simplified Chinese: 狮甲车站
Transcriptions
Standard Mandarin
- Hanyu Pinyin: Shījiǎ Chēzhàn
- Bopomofo: ㄕ ㄐㄧㄚˇ ㄔㄜ ㄓㄢˋ
- Wade–Giles: Shih^{1}-chia^{3} Ch'ê^{1}-chan^{4}
- Tongyong Pinyin: Shihjiǎ Chejhàn

General information
- Other names: Labor Park; 勞工公園
- Location: Cianjhen, Kaohsiung; Taiwan
- Coordinates: 22°36′22″N 120°18′29″E
- Operated by: Kaohsiung Rapid Transit Corporation
- Line(s): Red line (R7)
- Platforms: One island platform

Construction
- Structure type: Underground

History
- Opened: 2008-03-09

Passengers
- daily (Jan. 2011)

Services
Preceding station	Kaohsiung Metro	Following station
Sanduo Shopping District towards Gangshan	Red line	Kaisyuan towards Siaogang

Shihjia is a station on the Red line of Kaohsiung MRT in Cianjhen District, Kaohsiung, Taiwan.

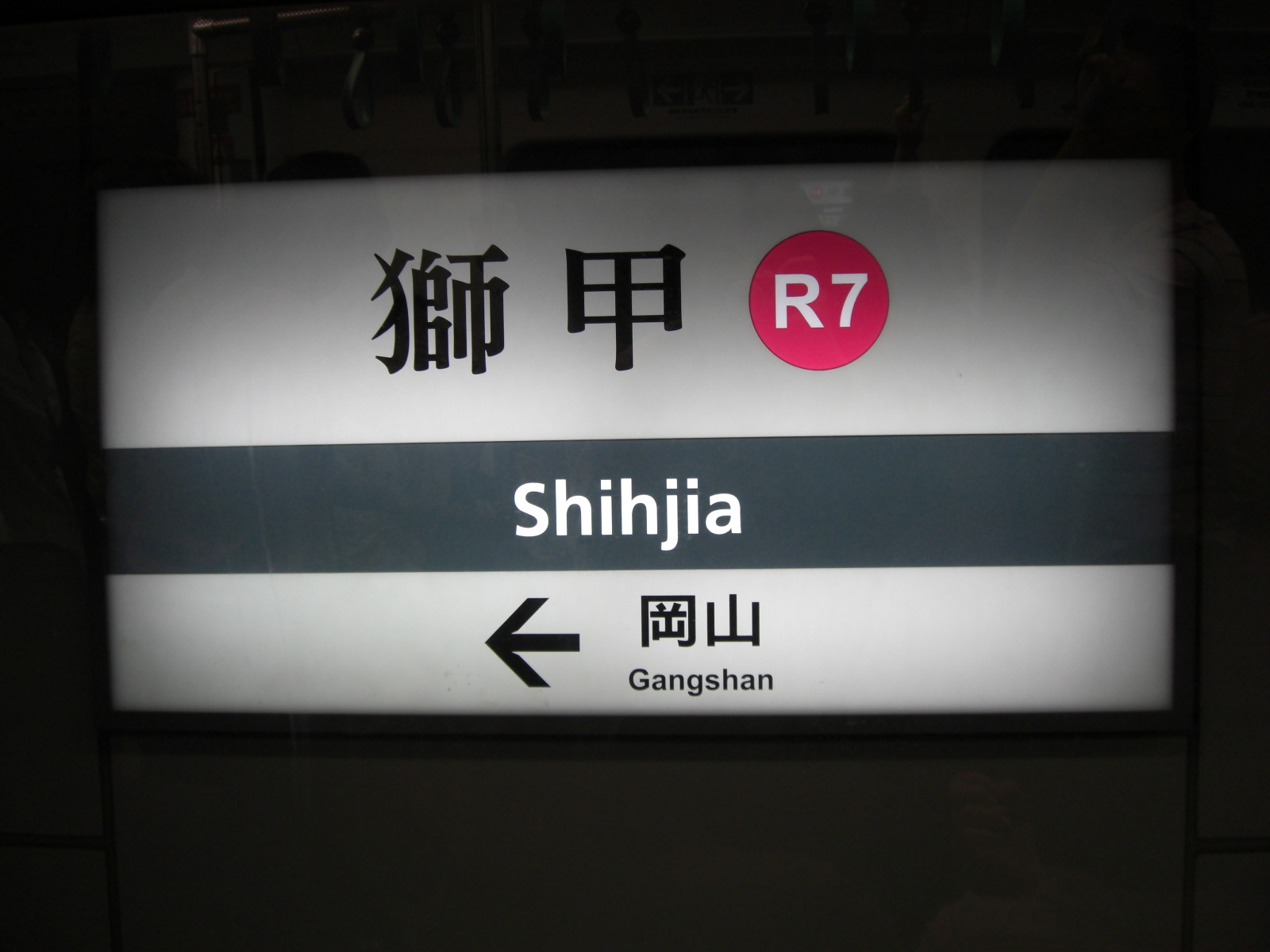
Kaohsiung MRT Shihjia station

The station is a three-level, underground station with an island platform and four exits. It is 188 meters long and is located at the intersection of Jhongshan 3rd Rd. and Mincyuan 2nd Rd.

== Around the station ==
- Carrefour Chenggong Store
- China Steel Corporation Headquarters
- Costco Kaohsiung Store
- IKEA Kaohsiung Store
- Labour Park
- Nanpu Power Plant
