= Dream Mall =

Shopping mall in Qianzhen, Kaohsiung, Taiwan

- 夢時代購物中心

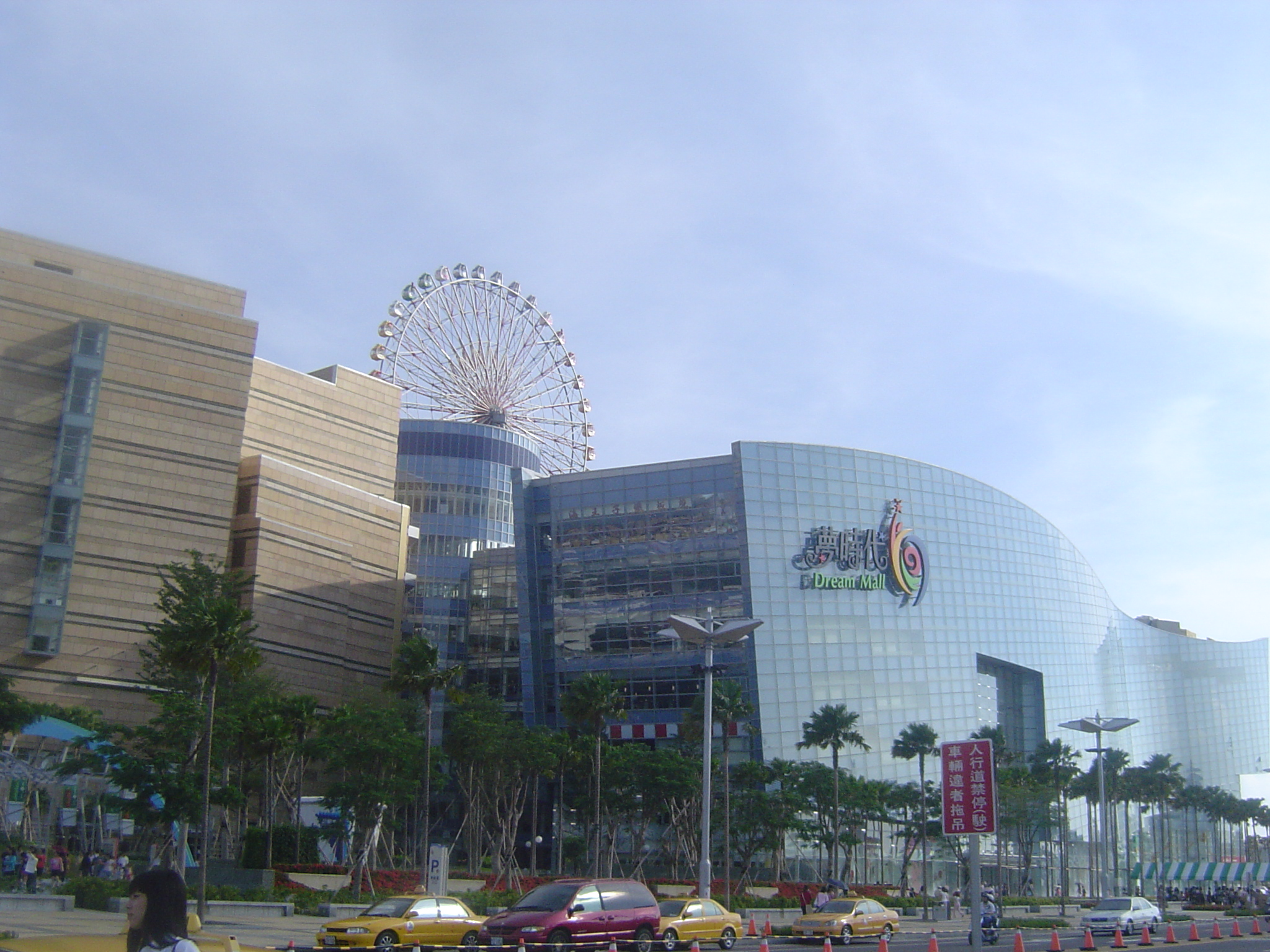
- Location: Cianjhen, Kaohsiung, Taiwan
- Coordinates: 22°35′42″N 120°18′25″E
- Opened: 12 May 2007; 19 years ago
- Developer: Tungcheng Development
- Manager: Tungcheng Development
- Owner: Tungcheng Development
- Num. of stores: 2,300
- Floor area: 401,218.67 m^{2}(parking included)
- Floors: 12; 5 below ground
- Parking: 3,561 cars 2,071 motorcycles
- Public transit: Kaisyuan Station
- Website: www.dreamall.com.tw

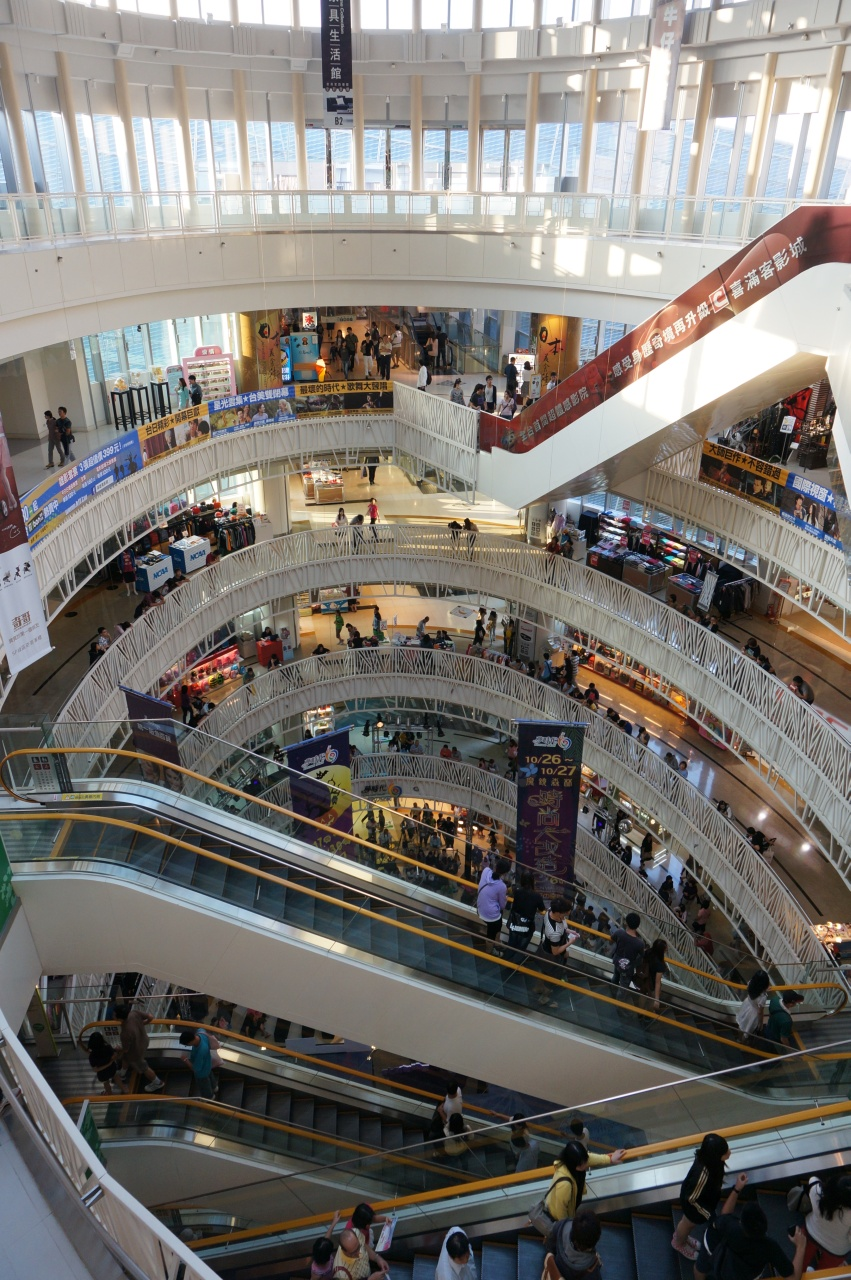
Interior of Dream Mall

Dream Mall (Chinese: 夢時代購物中心; pinyin: Mèngshídài Gòuwù Zhòngxīn), located in Cianjhen District, Kaohsiung, Taiwan, is the largest shopping mall in Taiwan and the 15th largest in East Asia (formerly the largest). It is built and operated by Tungcheng Development Corporation (Chinese: 統正開發股份有限公司), a subsidiary of Uni-President Enterprises Corporation, Taiwan's largest food conglomerate that also runs subsidiaries in many other industries. It was designed by international architecture firm RTKL, based in Baltimore, Maryland and opened on 12 May 2007, and contains restaurants, movie theater, gym, and entertainment facilities including a rooftop amusement park.

== Ferris wheel ==
The rooftop amusement park at Dream Mall is the home of the Kaohsiung Eye (Chinese: 高雄之眼) Ferris wheel. The wheel has a diameter of 50 meters (160 ft). Building and wheel have a combined height of 102.5 meters (336 ft).

== Transportation ==
The mall is served by Dream Mall light rail station of the LRT and accessible within walking distance west from Kaisyuan metro station of the Kaohsiung MRT.

== See also ==
- List of largest buildings in the world
- List of tourist attractions in Taiwan
- E-Da Outlet Mall
- Taroko Park
