= Circular light rail =

Light rail loop line in Kaohsiung, Taiwan

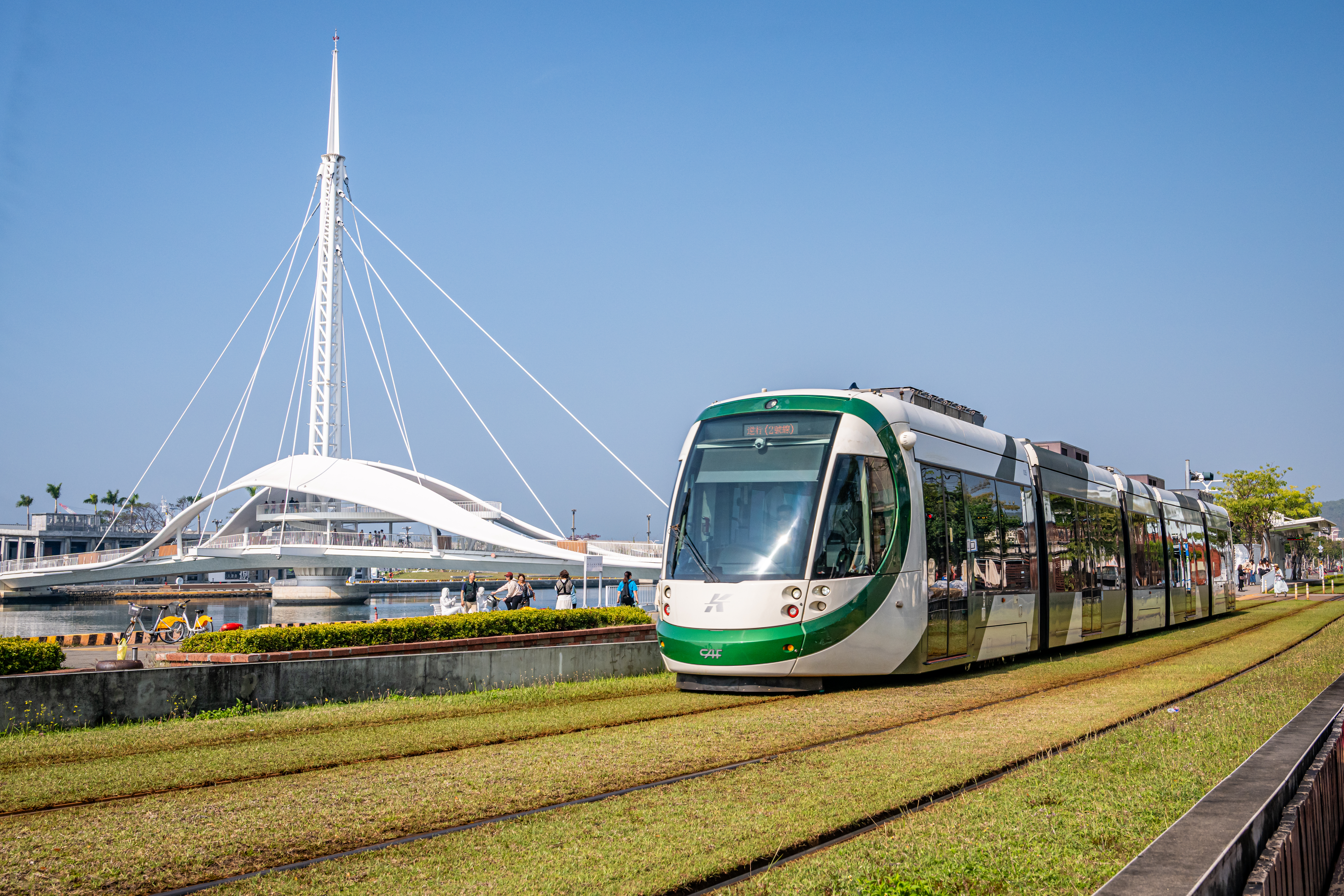
- CAF Urbos 3 tram near Dayi Pier-2

Overview
- Owner: Kaohsiung City Government
- Locale: Kaohsiung, Taiwan
- Stations: 38
- Website: krtco.com.tw

Service
- Type: Light rail
- System: Kaohsiung Metro
- Operator: Kaohsiung Rapid Transit Corporation
- Depot: Cianjhen Depot
- Rolling stock: CAF Urbos 3 Alstom Citadis 305
- Daily ridership: 10 000
- Ridership: 3,360,000 (2018)

History
- Commenced: 16 October 2015 (phase 1)
- Opened: 16 October 2015; 10 years ago

Technical
- Line length: 22.1 km (13.7 mi)
- Number of tracks: 2
- Character: At-grade, elevated
- Track gauge: 1,435 mm (4 ft 8 1/2 in) standard gauge
- Electrification: Electric capacitor
- Operating speed: 70 km/h (43 mph) maximum

Circular light rail
- Traditional Chinese: 環狀輕軌
- Simplified Chinese: 环状轻轨
Transcriptions
Standard Mandarin
- Hanyu Pinyin: Huánzhuàng Qīngguǐ
- Wade–Giles: Huan²-chuang⁴ Chʻing¹-kuei³
- Tongyong Pinyin: Huánjhuàng Cingguěi
Hakka
- Pha̍k-fa-sṳ: Fàn-chhong Khiâng-kuí
Southern Min
- Hokkien POJ: Khoân-chōng Kheng-kúi/Khin-thih

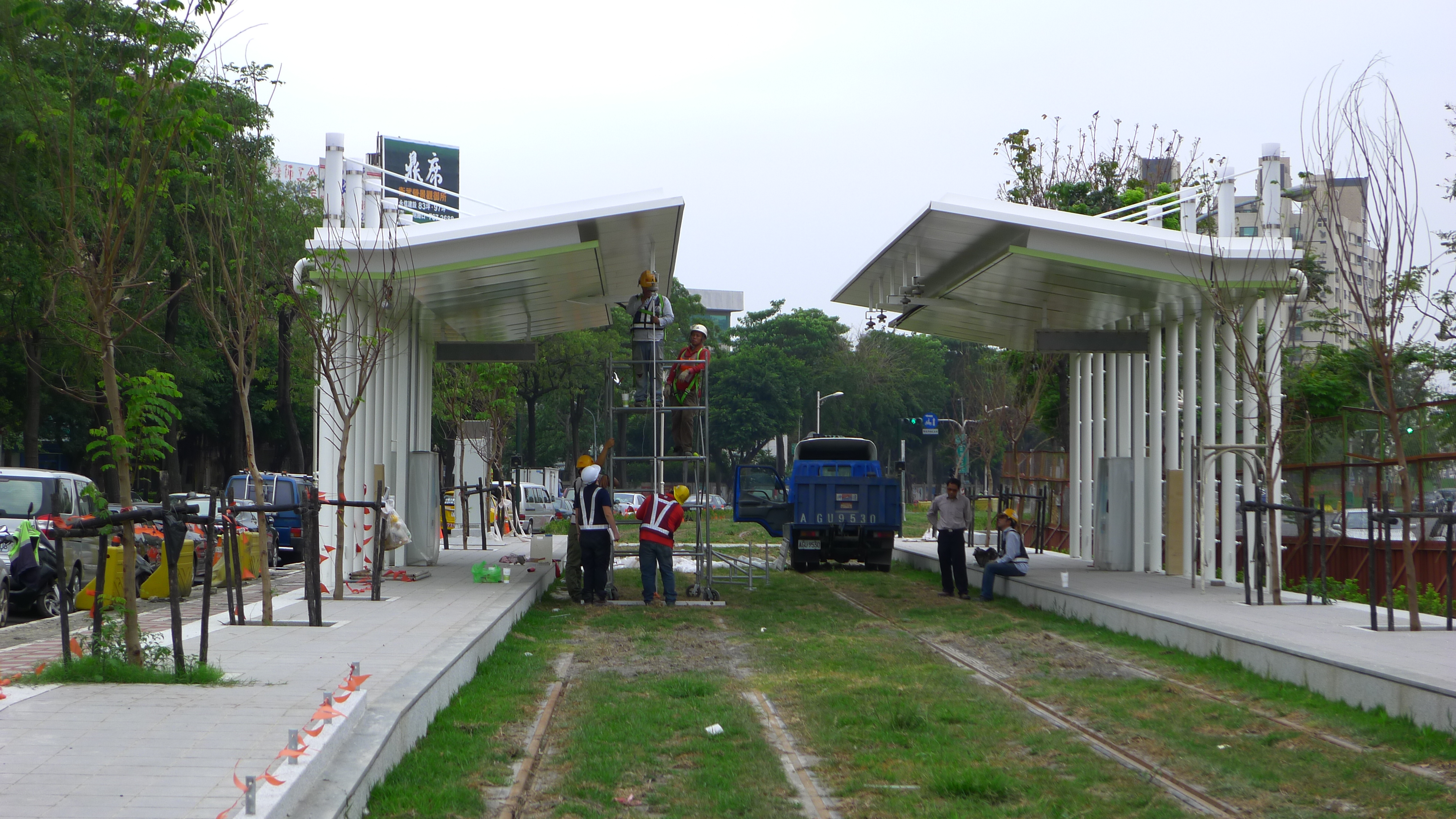
Lizihnei station (9 March 2015)

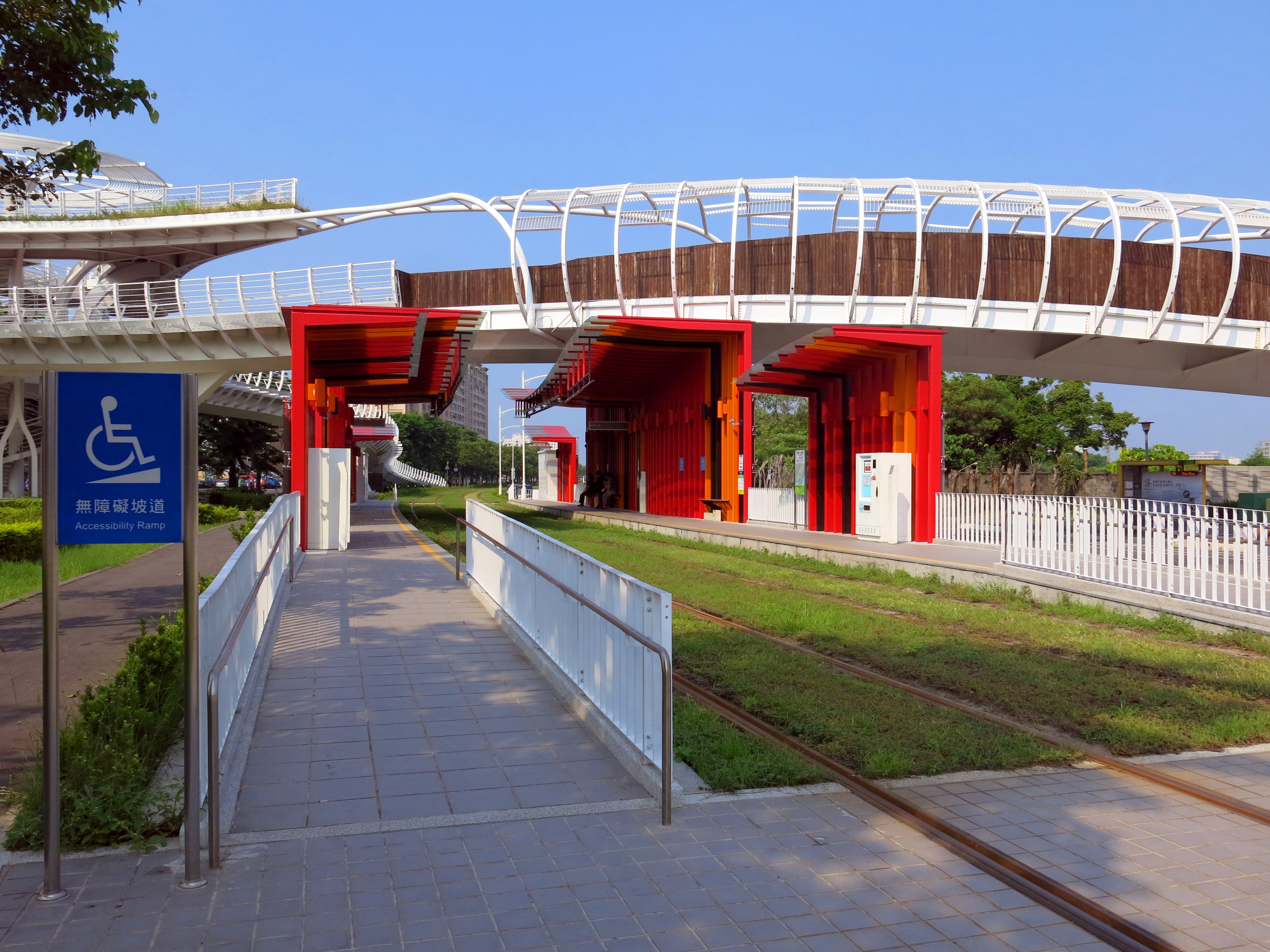
Cianjhen Star station (27 August 2016)

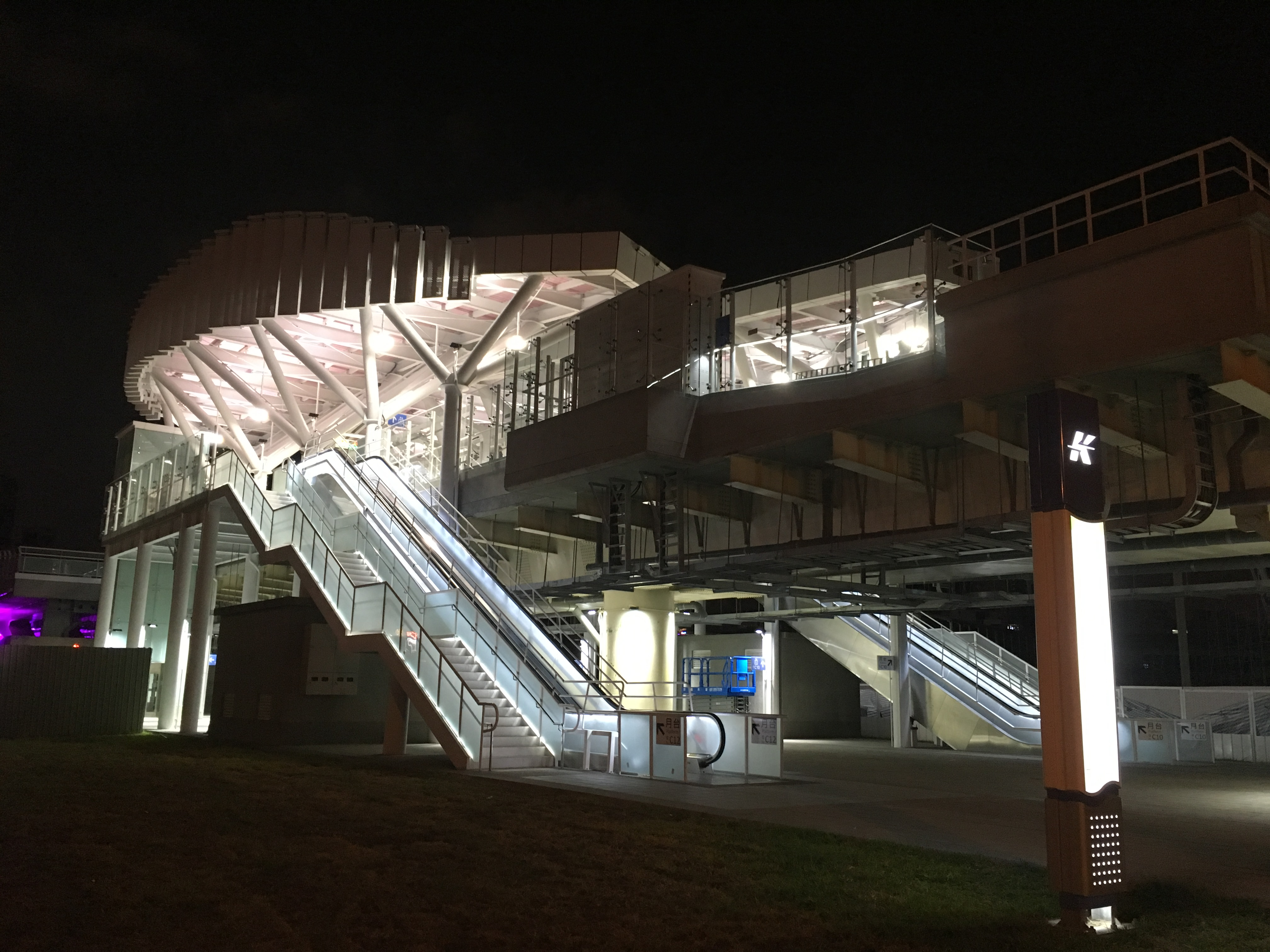
Love Pier station (22 July 2017)

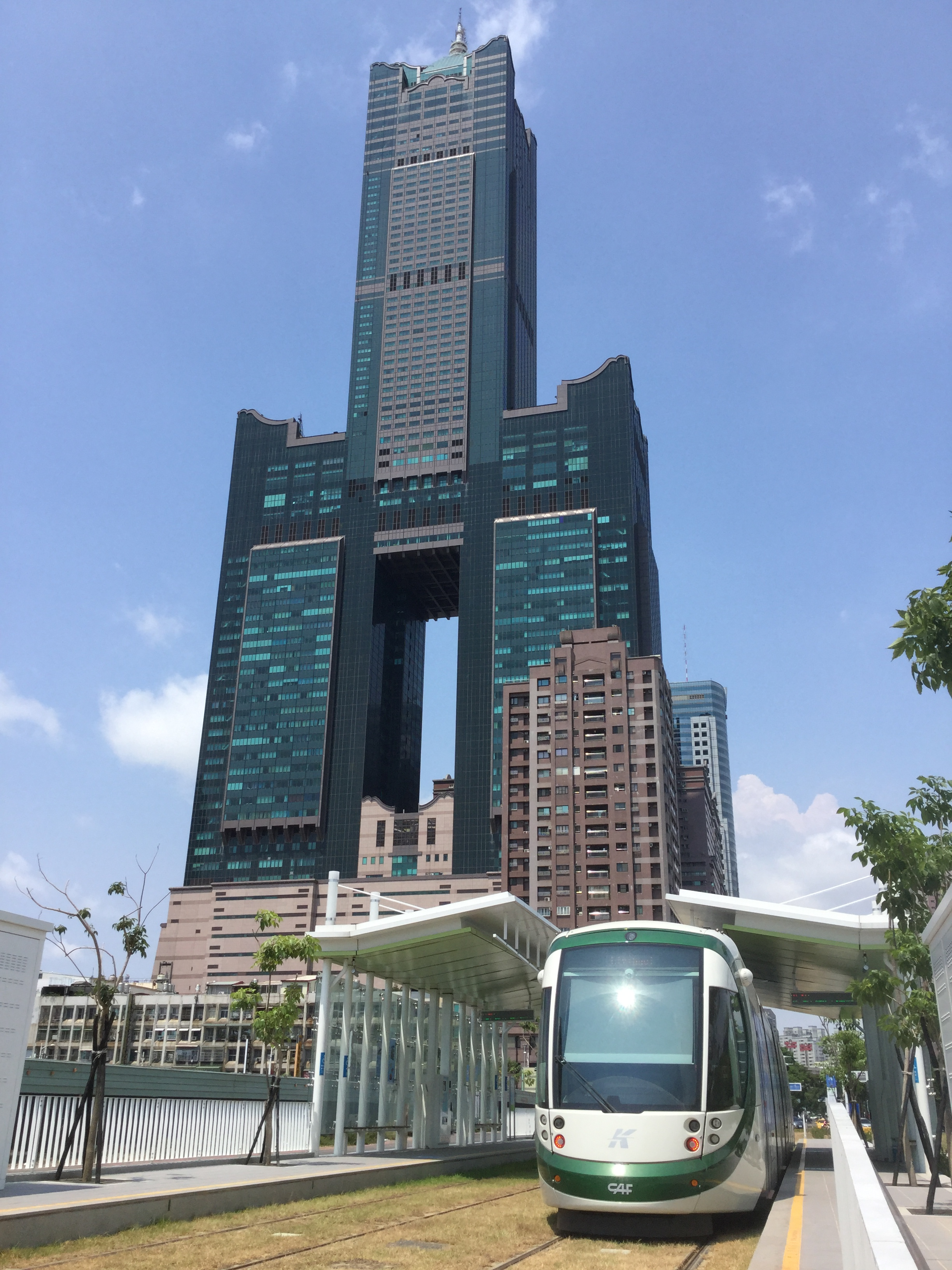
Kaohsiung Exhibition Center station and the 85 Sky Tower

The Kaohsiung Circular Light Rail (Chinese: 高雄環狀輕軌; pinyin: Gāoxióng huán zhuàng qīngguǐ; Pe̍h-ōe-jī: Ko-hiông Khoân-chōng Khing-khùi) is a light rail loop line in Kaohsiung, Taiwan, operated by the Kaohsiung Rapid Transit Corporation. The line stretches over a length of 22.1 kilometers and has 38 stations. The southern part of this line makes use of the defunct tracks of the Kaohsiung Harbor Railway Line. Construction cost was forecasted to be 16.5 billion New Taiwan dollars.

Phase I consists of the section of the line from Station C1 to Station C14, of which Stations C3 and C14 are transfer stations to the KMRT Red line and Orange line, respectively. Construction of Phase I began on 4 June 2013. Stations C1 to C14 were open on a test-basis (free for the public) from August 2015, and commenced formal operations in September 2017.

Phase II construction of the northern section partially began on 12 January 2021 after the underground relocation of the Kaohsiung urban railway. The northern part of Phase II was scheduled to be opened in June 2021 along with the rest, but was delayed until 1 January 2024 due to local opposition.

== History ==
Phase	Segment	Commencement	Length (km)	Stations
I	Lizihnei - Hamasen	4 July 2016	8.7	14
II Phase 1	Hamasen - Gushan District Office; Lizihnei - Kaisyuan Park	12 January 2021	4.1	9
II Phase 2	Gushan District Office - TRA Museum of Fine Arts	16 December 2021	1.8	3
II Phase 3	TRA Museum of Fine Arts - Heart of Love River	5 October 2022	2.4	4
II Full	Heart of Love River - Kaisyuan Park	1 January 2024	5	7

== Stations ==
Code	Station name	Station type		Locale		Sta. distance (km)		Opened date	Transfer
Code	Station name	Structure	Platform	Locale		Previous	Total	Opened date	Transfer
Circular light rail
Continue with LRT Depot station
C1	Lizihnei 籬仔內	Ground	Side	Cianjhen	Kaohsiung	0.457	21.997 0.000	2015-10-16	—N/a
C2	Kaisyuan Rueitian 凱旋瑞田	Ground	Side	Cianjhen	Kaohsiung	0.740	0.740	2015-10-16	—N/a
C3	Cianjhen Star 前鎮之星	Ground	Side	Cianjhen	Kaohsiung	0.638	1.378	2015-10-16	Red line (Kaisyuan)
C4	Kaisyuan Jhonghua 凱旋中華	Ground	Side	Cianjhen	Kaohsiung	0.704	2.082	2015-10-16	—N/a
C5	Dream Mall 夢時代	Ground	Side	Cianjhen	Kaohsiung	0.691	2.773	2016-6-26	—N/a
C6	Commerce and Trade Park 經貿園區	Ground	Side	Cianjhen	Kaohsiung	0.623	3.396	2016-6-26	—N/a
C7	Software Technology Park 軟體園區	Ground	Side	Cianjhen	Kaohsiung	0.519	3.915	2016-6-26	—N/a
C8	Kaohsiung Exhibition Center 高雄展覽館	Ground	Side	Lingya	Kaohsiung	0.636	4.551	2016-6-26	—N/a
C9	Cruise Terminal 旅運中心	Ground	Side	Lingya	Kaohsiung	0.691	5.242	2017-6-30	Yellow line
C10	Glory Pier 光榮碼頭	Ground	Side	Lingya	Kaohsiung	0.727	5.969	2017-6-30	—N/a
C11	Love Pier 真愛碼頭	Elevated	Side	Yancheng	Kaohsiung	0.627	6.596	2017-6-30	—N/a
C12	Dayi Pier-2 駁二大義	Ground	Side	Yancheng	Kaohsiung	0.521	7.117	2017-6-30	—N/a
C13	Penglai Pier-2 駁二蓬萊	Ground	Side	Yancheng	Kaohsiung	0.487	7.604	2017-9-26	—N/a
C14	Hamasen 哈瑪星	Ground	Side	Gushan	Kaohsiung	0.609	8.213	2017-9-26	Orange line
C15	Shoushan Park 壽山公園	Ground	Side	Gushan	Kaohsiung	0.515	8.728	2021-1-12	—N/a
C16	Wenwu Temple 文武聖殿	Ground	Side	Gushan	Kaohsiung	0.538	9.266	2021-1-12	—N/a
C17	Gushan District Office 鼓山區公所	Ground	Side	Gushan	Kaohsiung	0.756	10.022	2021-1-12	—N/a
C18	Gushan 鼓山	Ground	Side	Gushan	Kaohsiung	0.558	10.580	2021-12-16	Western Trunk line
C19	Makadao 馬卡道	Ground	Side	Gushan	Kaohsiung	0.565	11.145	2021-12-16	—N/a
C20	TRA Museum of Fine Arts 臺鐵美術館	Ground	Side	Gushan	Kaohsiung	0.584	11.729	2021-12-16	Western Trunk line
C21A	Neiwei Arts Center 內惟藝術中心	Ground	Side	Gushan	Kaohsiung	0.395	12.124	2022-10-5	—N/a
C21	Kaohsiung Museum of Fine Arts 美術館	Ground	Side	Gushan	Kaohsiung	0.458	12.582	2022-10-5	—N/a
C22	Kaohsiung Municipal United Hospital 聯合醫院	Ground	Island	Gushan	Kaohsiung	0.366	12.948	2022-10-5	Blue line
C23	Longhua Elementary School 龍華國小	Ground	Island	Gushan	Kaohsiung	0.432	13.380	2022-10-5	—N/a
C24	Heart of Love River 愛河之心	Ground	Side	Gushan	Kaohsiung	0.866	14.246	2022-10-5	Red line (Aozihdi)
C25	Sinshang Elementary School 新上國小	Ground	Side	Zuoying	Kaohsiung	0.580	14.826	2024-1-1	—N/a
C26	Dashun Minzu 大順民族	Ground	Side	Sanmin	Kaohsiung	0.690	15.516	2024-1-1	Purple line
C27	Wanzihnei 灣仔內	Ground	Side	Sanmin	Kaohsiung	0.418	15.934	2024-1-1	—N/a
C28	Kaohsiung Industrial High School 高雄高工	Ground	Side	Sanmin	Kaohsiung	0.676	16.610	2024-1-1	Yellow line
C29	Shu-Te Home-Economics & Commercial High School 樹德家商	Ground	Side	Sanmin	Kaohsiung	0.720	17.330	2024-1-1	—N/a
C30	Science and Technology Museum 科工館	Ground	Side	Sanmin	Kaohsiung	0.803	18.133	2024-1-1	Western Trunk line (Pingtung)
C31	St. Joseph Hospital 聖功醫院	Ground	Side	Lingya	Kaohsiung	0.480	18.613	2024-1-1	—N/a
C32	Kaisyuan Park 凱旋公園	Ground	Side	Lingya	Kaohsiung	0.481	19.094	2021-1-12	Orange line (Wukuaicuo)
C33	Department of Health 衛生局	Ground	Side	Lingya	Kaohsiung	0.510	19.604	2021-1-12	—N/a
C34	Wucyuan Elementary School 五權國小	Ground	Side	Lingya	Kaohsiung	0.470	20.074	2021-1-12	—N/a
C35	Kaisyuan Wuchang 凱旋武昌	Ground	Side	Lingya	Kaohsiung	0.505	20.579	2021-1-12	—N/a
C36	Kaisyuan Ersheng 凱旋二聖	Ground	Side	Fengshan	Kaohsiung	0.499	21.078	2021-1-12	—N/a
C37	LRT Depot 輕軌機廠	Ground	Side	Cianjhen	Kaohsiung	0.462	21.540	2021-1-12	—N/a
Continue with Lizihnei station

== Rolling stock ==
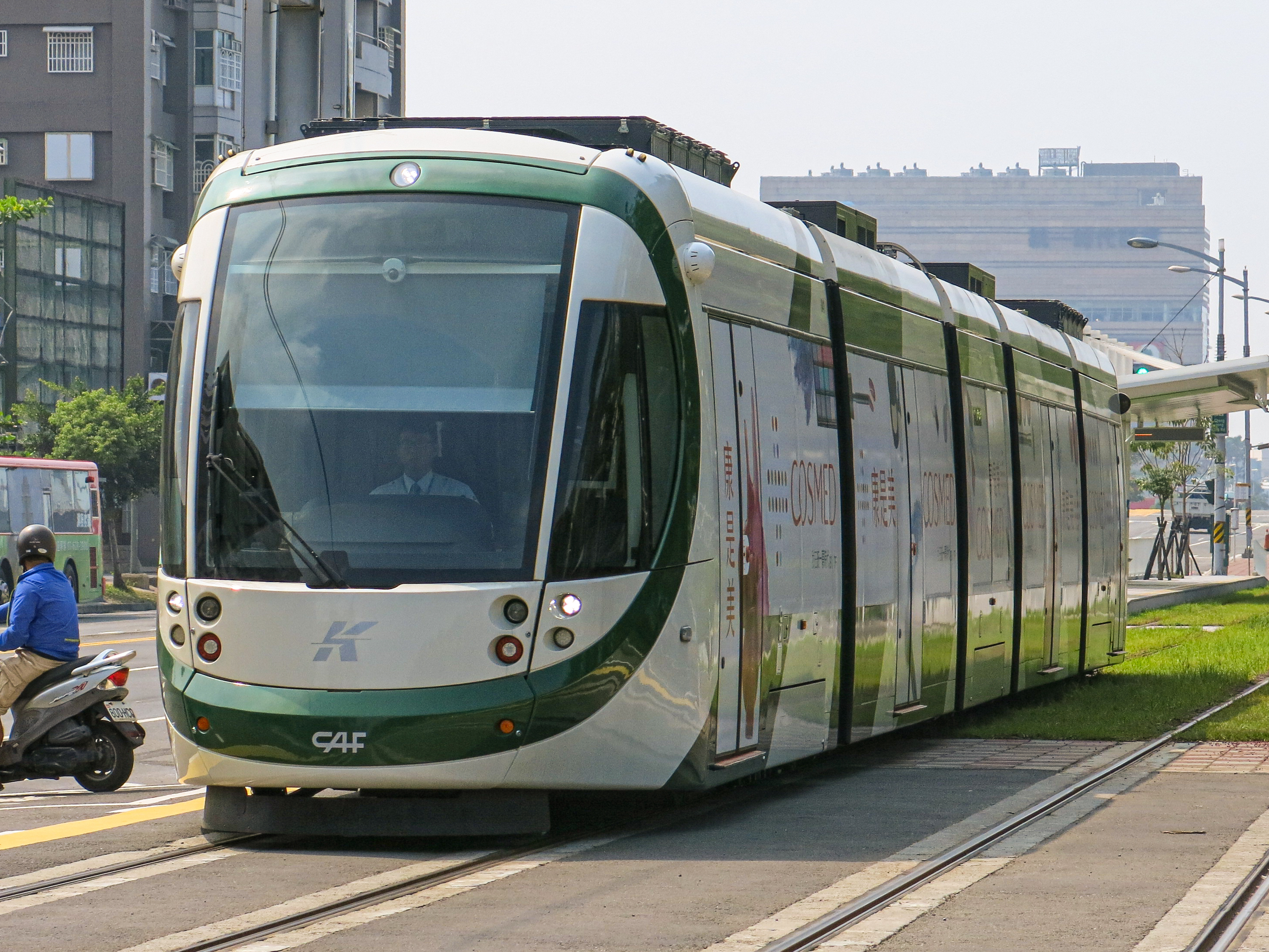
CAF Urbos

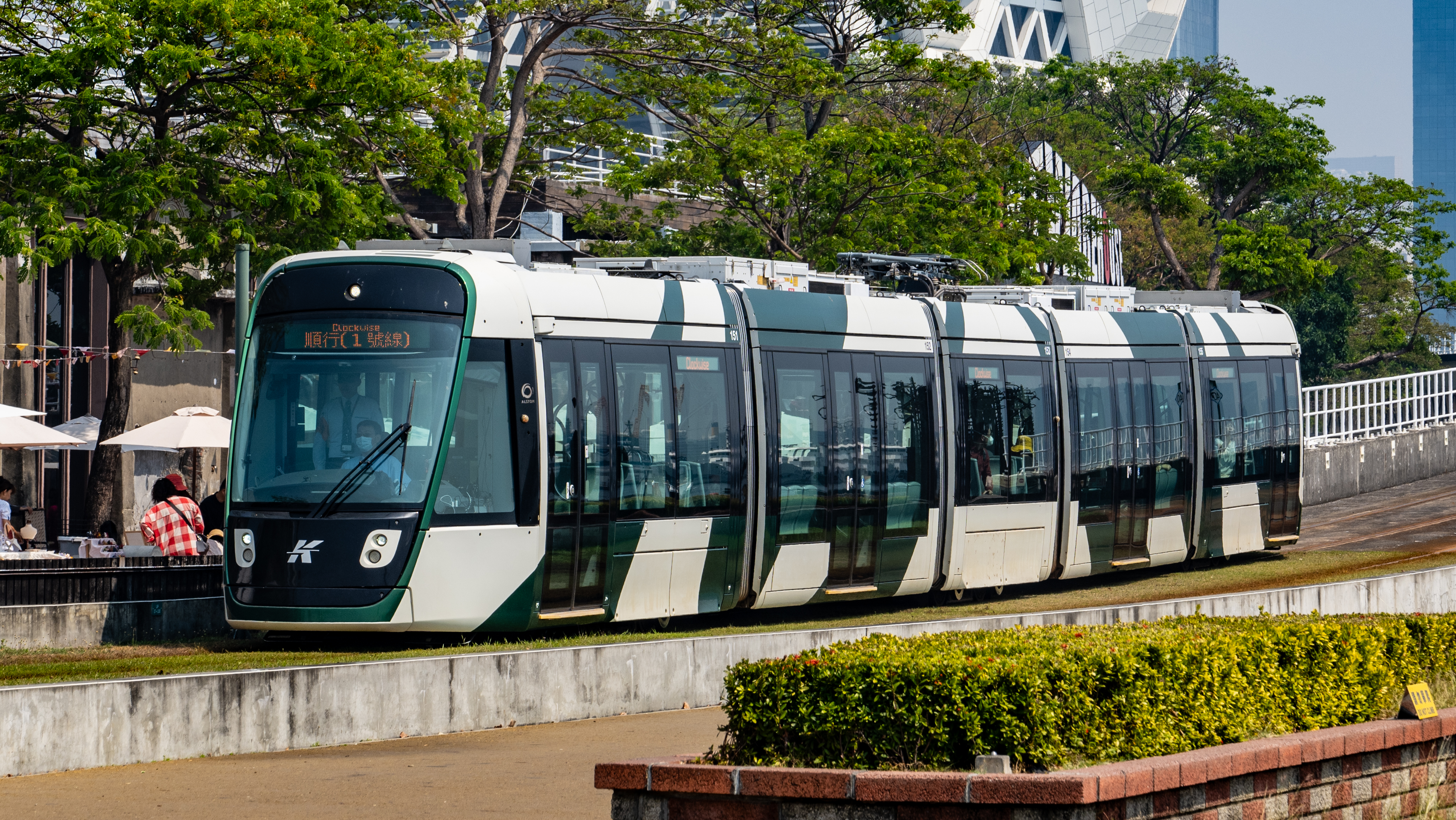
Citadis 305

The line's fleet consists of nine CAF Urbos trams that are powered by supercapacitor banks. The tramway cars are 34 meters (112 ft) in length, and are able to transport a total of 250 passengers (seated, and standing).

Fifteen Alstom Citadis 305 tramway cars entered service in November 2020.

== Tickets ==
Unlike the Kaohsiung Metro Red and Orange lines, the Kaohsiung Light Rail is charged at a lower rate. As of January 2019, the fare for each light rail is NT$30. There is special rate of NT$10 by using a digital wallet (such as iPass, EasyCard, icash, etc). Card readers are available at each station and inside the tramway. When paying the fare, passengers are only charged for one e-ticket at a time. When paying by cash, passengers can purchase tickets at the ticket vending machines at each station for the ticket inspector to check.

== Previous light rail demonstration project ==
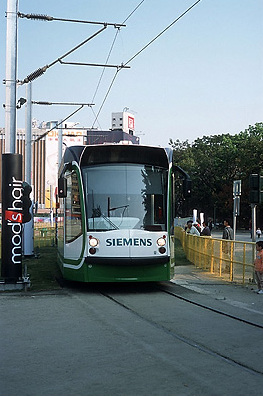
The Siemens Combino vehicle was used for light rail demonstration at Central Park, Kaohsiung in 2004.

In 2004, the Kaohsiung City Government and Siemens built a temporary two-station circular light rail line in Central Park, operated by a single trainset, to demonstrate the feasibility of building a light rail system in Kaohsiung City. This was meant to alleviate some residents' concerns that light rail would negatively impact their surroundings by producing excessive noise and hindering normal traffic flow. This Siemens Combino vehicle would later become the D2 Class operated in Melbourne, Australia.

== See also ==
- Danhai light rail
- Transportation in Taiwan
- Kaohsiung Metro
