= Kaohsiung Exhibition Center =

Convention center in Qianzhen, Kaohsiung, Taiwan

Kaohsiung Exhibition Center 高雄展覽館
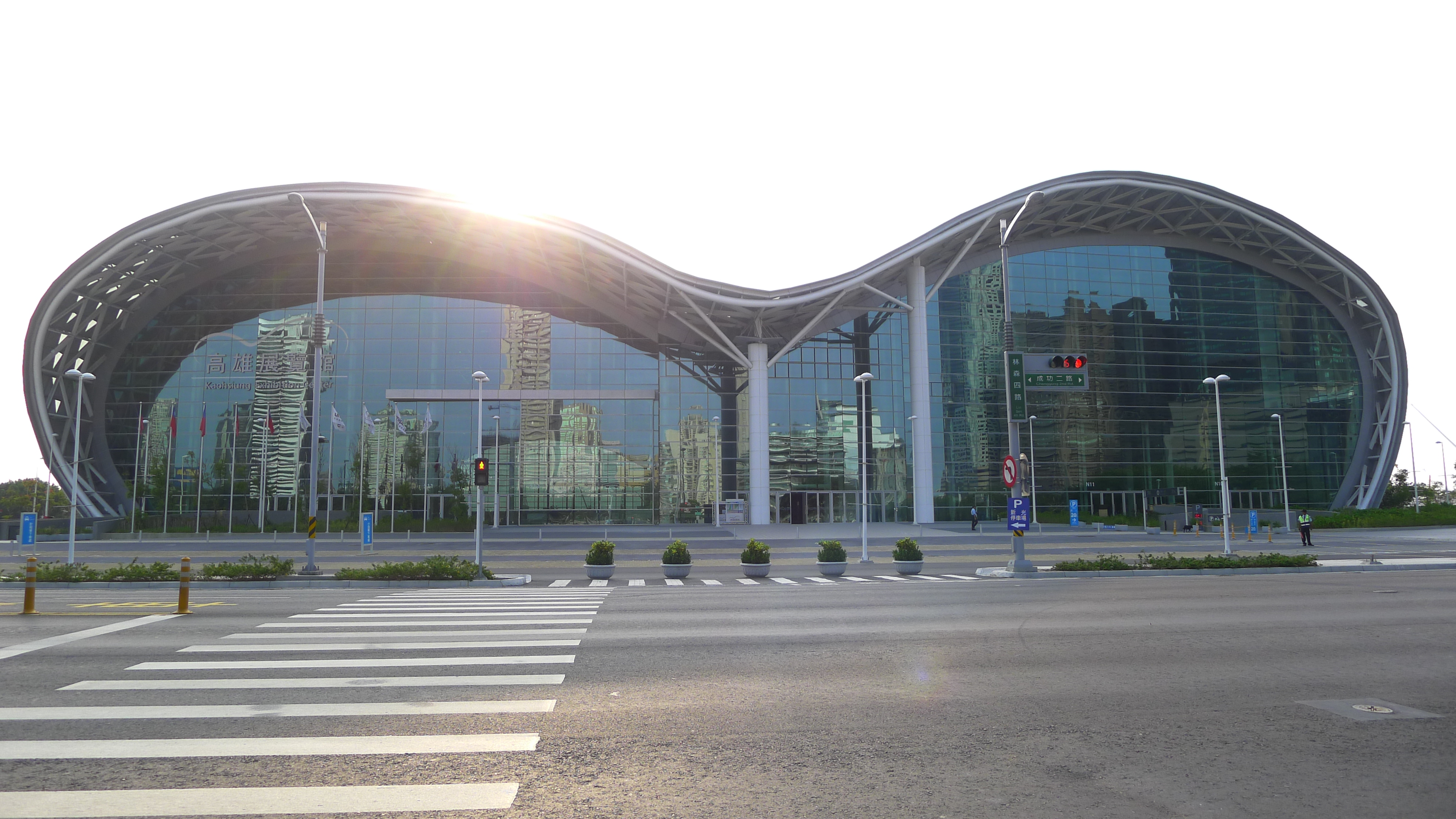
- Kaohsiung Exhibition Center
- Interactive map of Kaohsiung Exhibition Center 高雄展覽館
- Location: Cianjhen, Kaohsiung, Taiwan
- Coordinates: 22°36′28.3″N 120°17′57.5″E
- Public transit: Sanduo Shopping District Station

Construction
- Opened: 14 April 2014
- Architect: Philip Cox

Website
- Official website

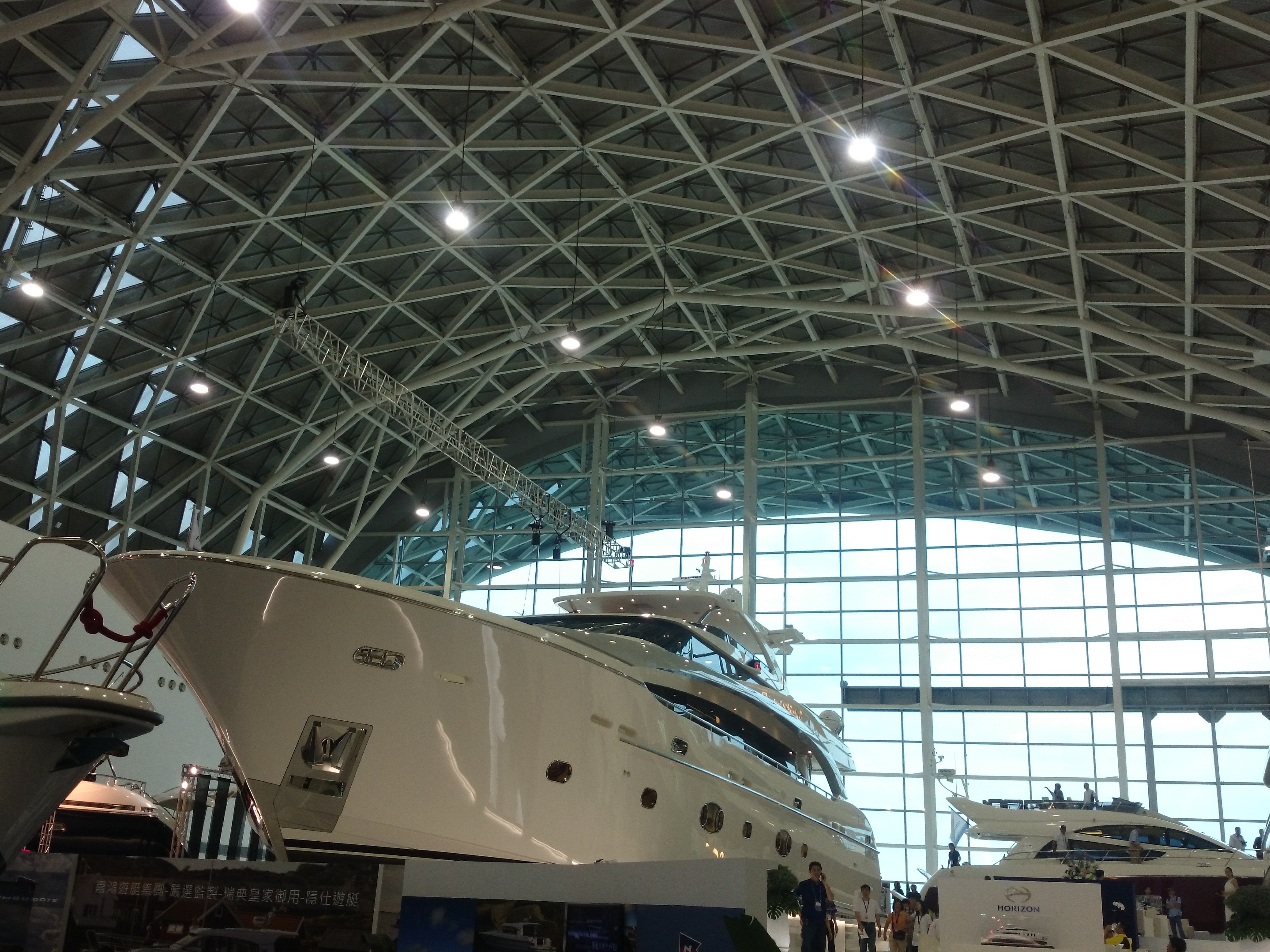
Interior of Kaohsiung Exhibition Center

The Kaohsiung Exhibition Center (KEC; traditional Chinese: 高雄展覽館; simplified Chinese: 高雄展览馆; pinyin: Gāoxióng Zhǎnlǎn Guǎn) is a convention center in Cianjhen District, Kaohsiung, Taiwan.

== History ==
Designed by Australian architect, Philip Cox, the KEC was initiated in 2006 and built by the Ministry of Economic Affairs in which has invested NT$ 3 billion to the venue. After seven years of planning and two years of construction, the grand opening of the center was held on 14 April 2014.

== Organization ==
The Kaohsiung Exhibition Center Corporation manages the daily operation and maintenance of the center for the next 12.5 years. The company invested NT$ 250 million to upgrade the center and expects to generate return on investment of up to NT$ 3.4 billion by the end of 2026.

== Gallery ==
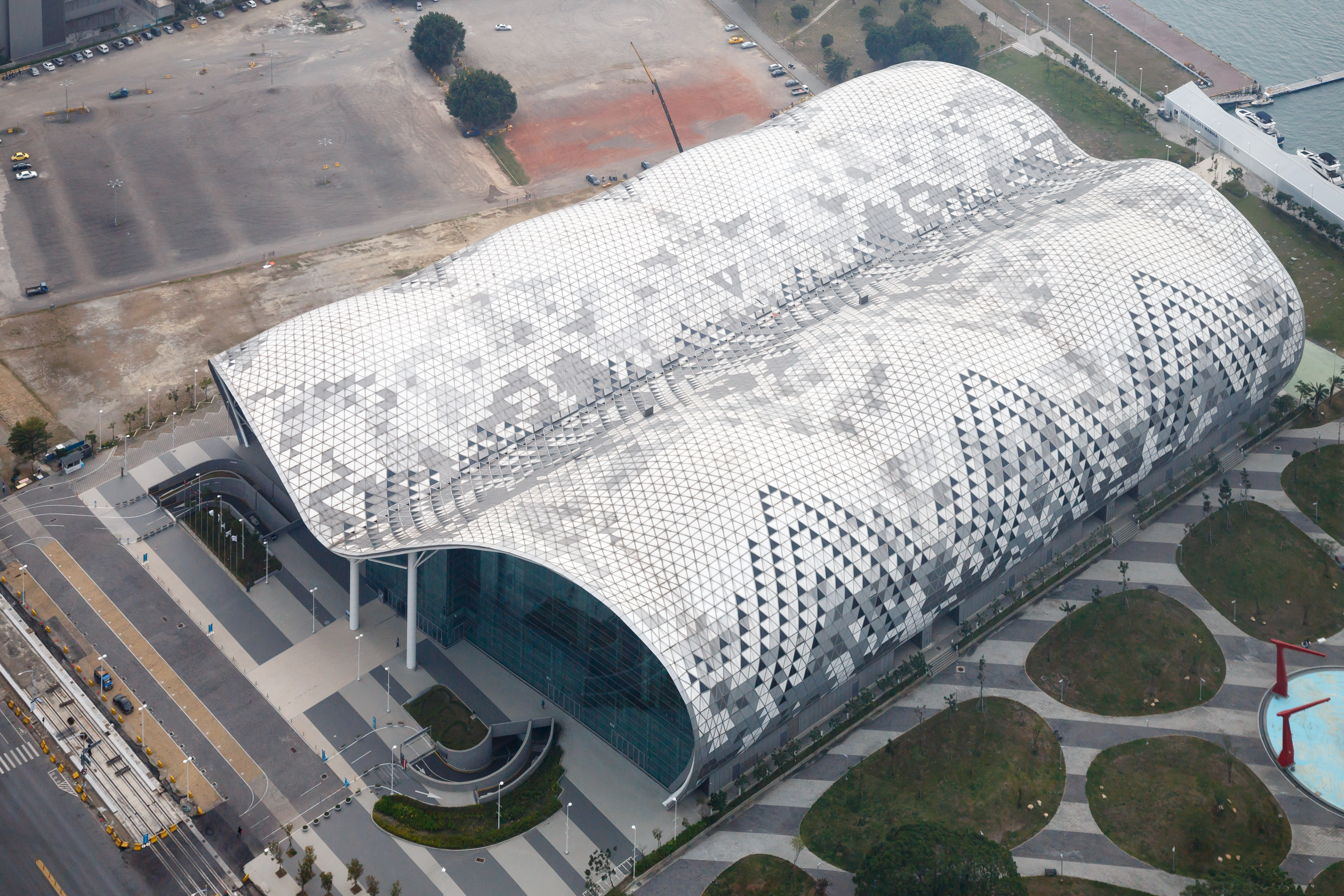
Kaohsiung Exhibition Center, birds eye view.

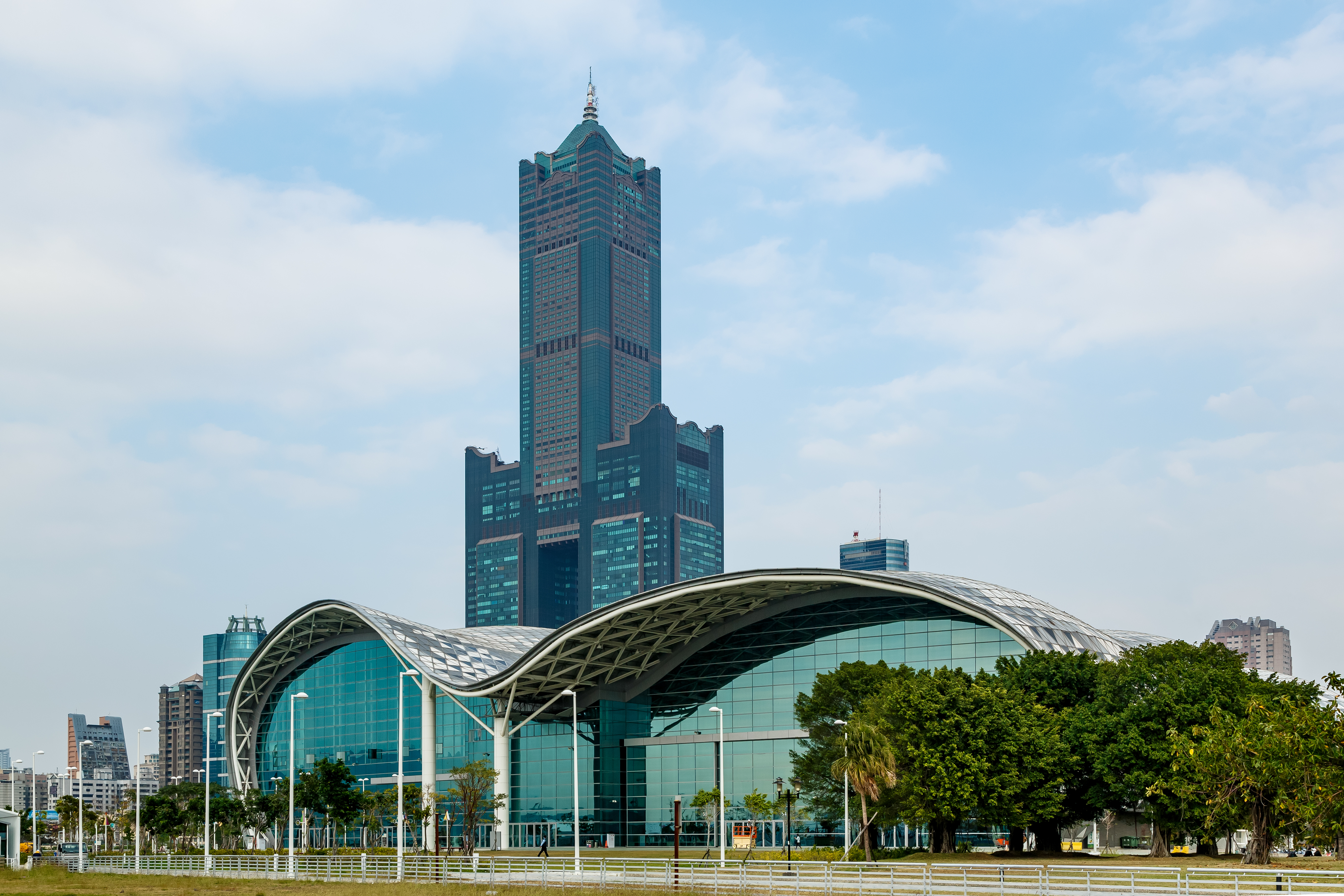
Kaohsiung Exhibition Center with 85 Sky Tower.

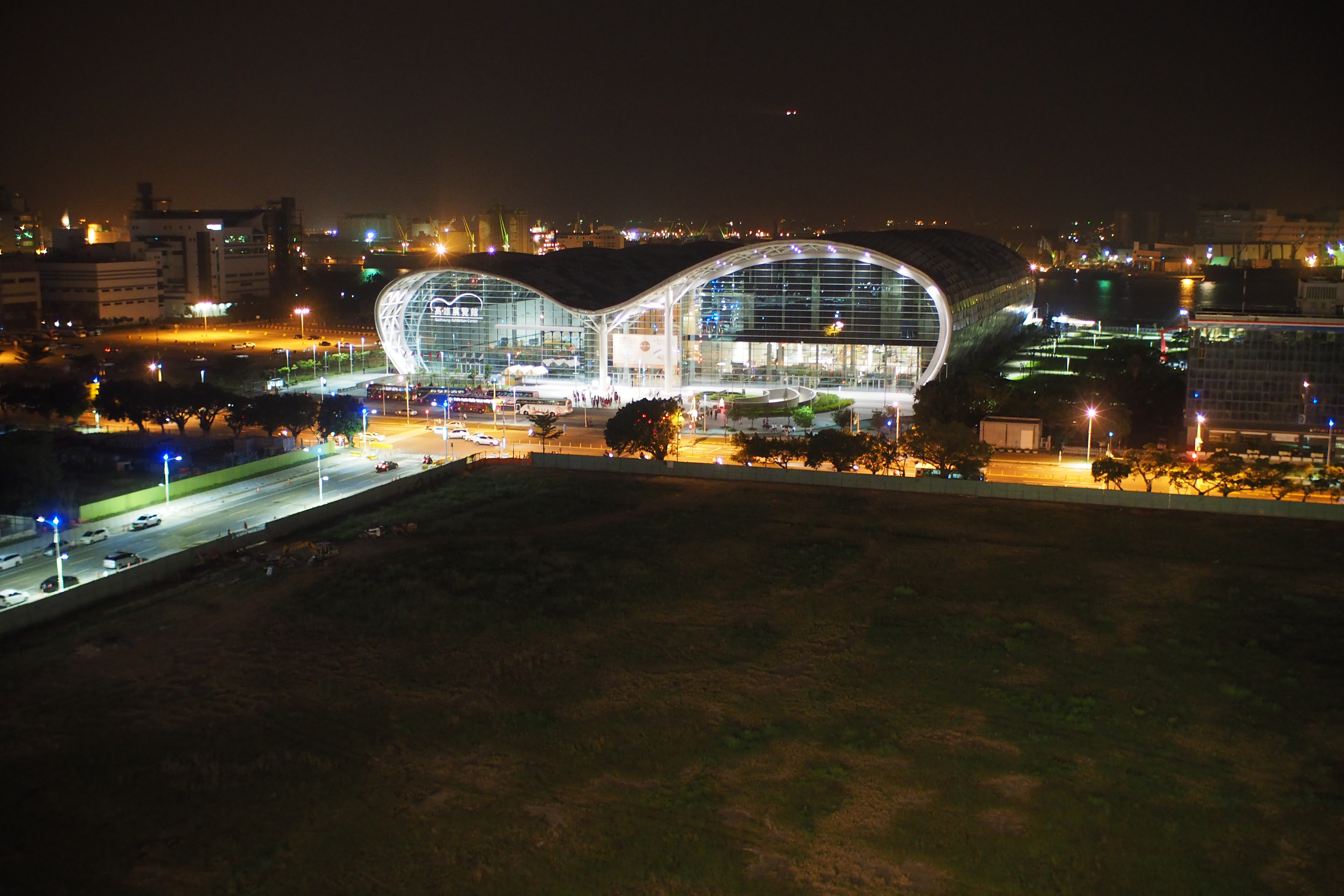
Kaohsiung Exhibition Center at night.

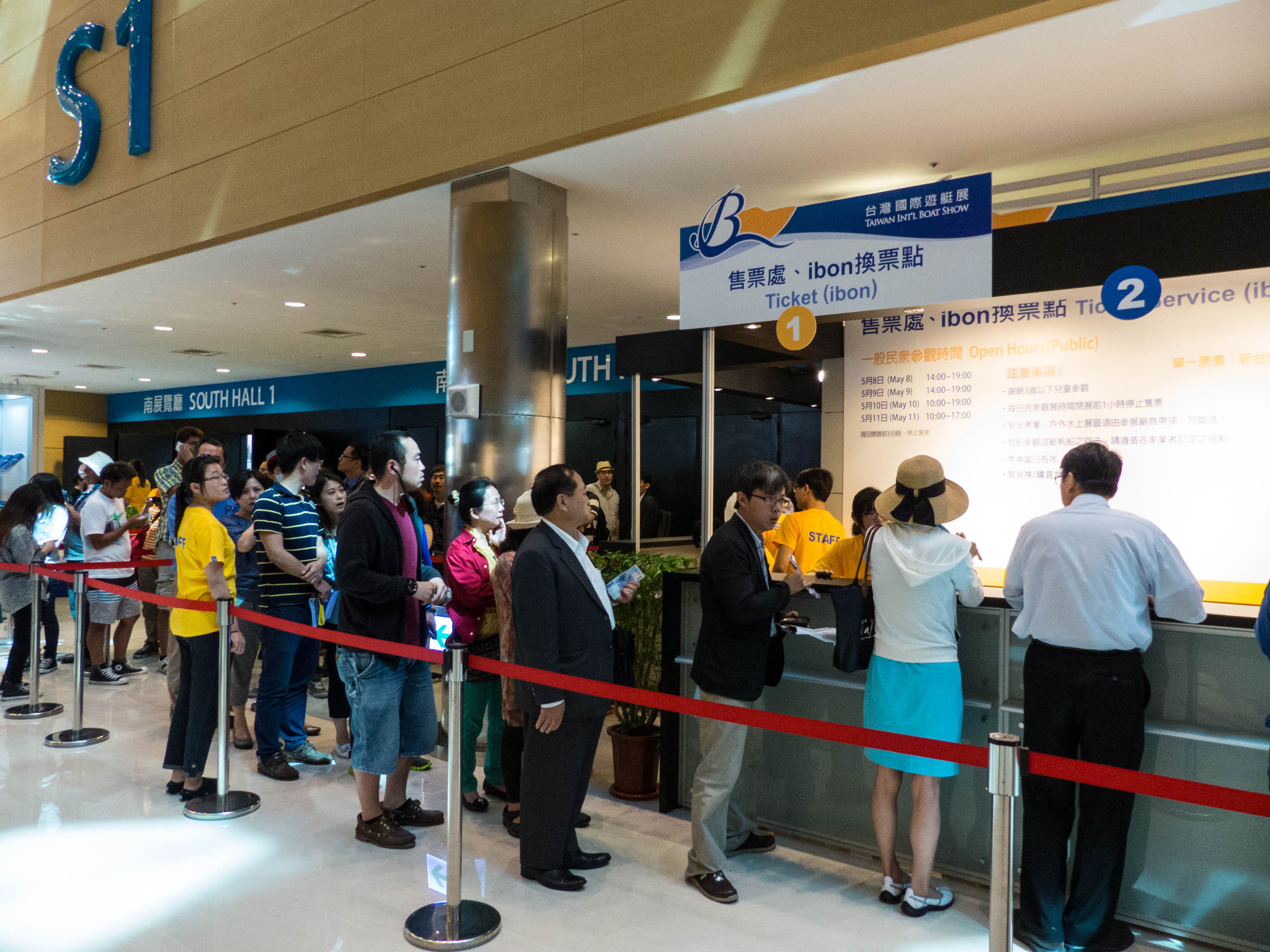
Kaohsiung Exhibition Center indoor ticket windows

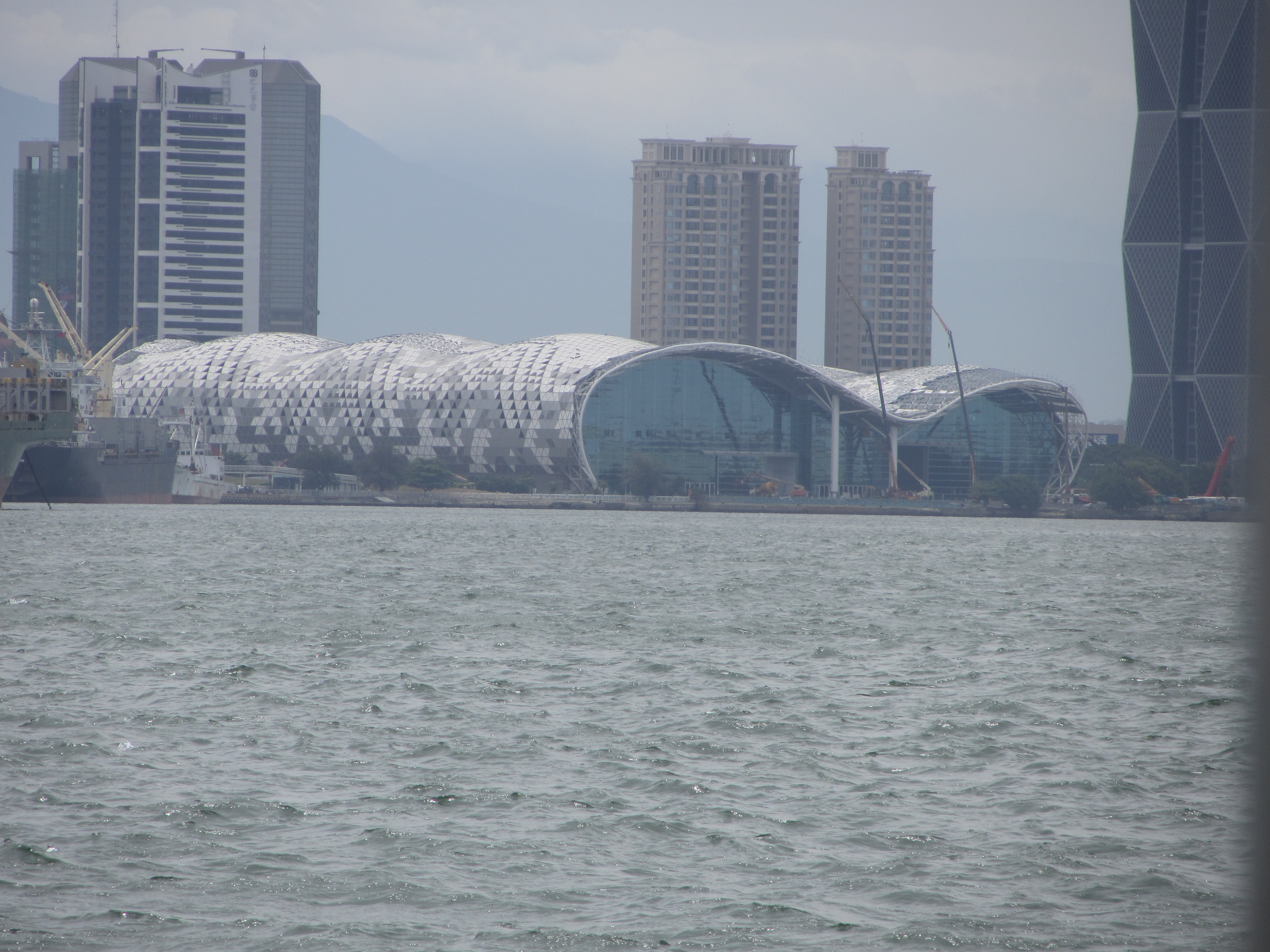
Kaohsiung Exhibition Center under construction (near completion).

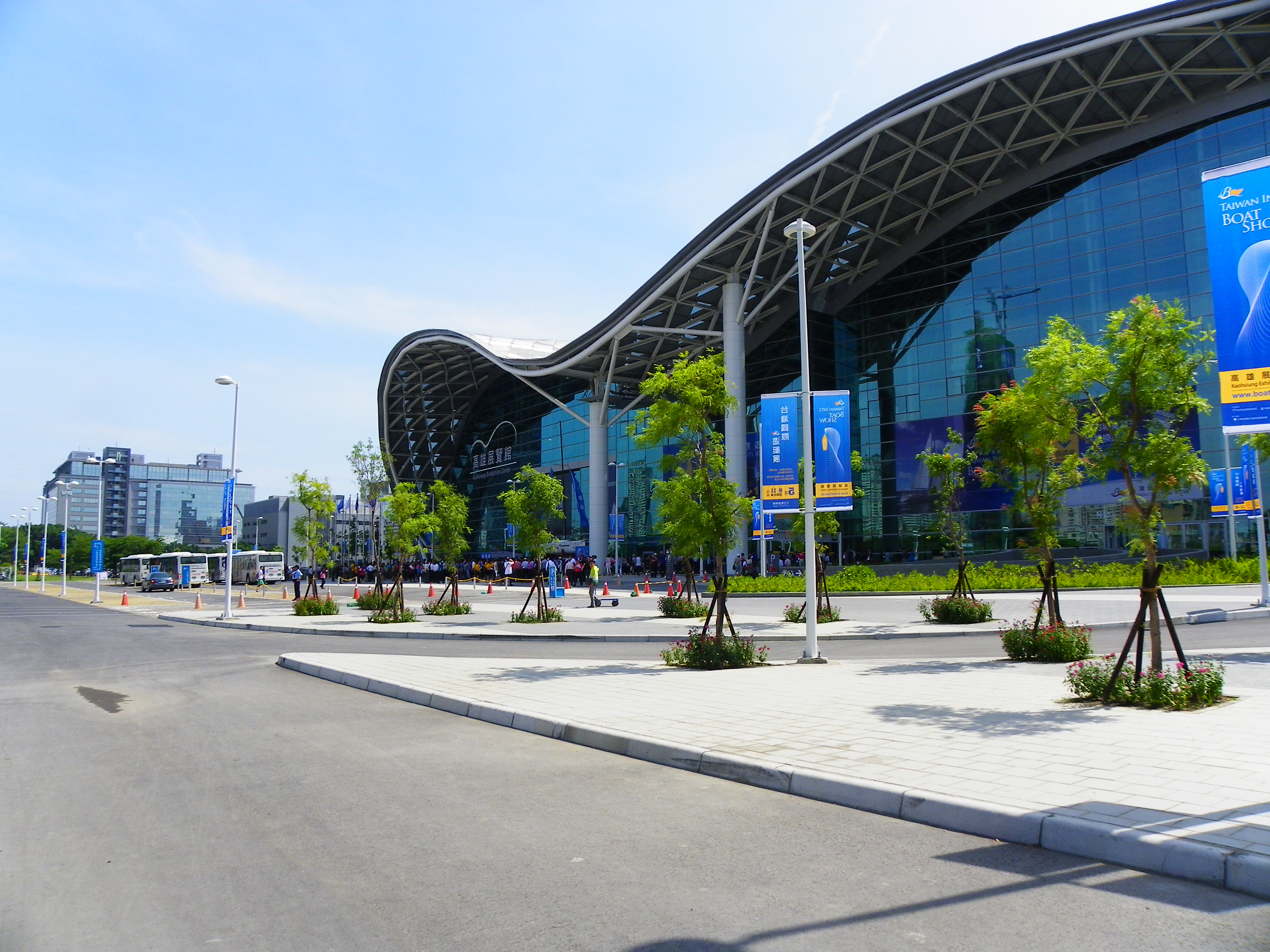
Kaohsiung Exhibition Center East side

== Transportation ==
The center is accessible within walking distance south west from Sanduo Shopping District Station of Kaohsiung MRT.

The center can also be accessible by walking south of the Kaohsiung Exhibition Center light rail station.

== See also ==
- International Convention Center Kaohsiung
- List of convention centers in Taiwan
- List of tourist attractions in Taiwan
