= Nanpu Power Plant =

Power plant in Qianzhen, Kaohsiung, Taiwan

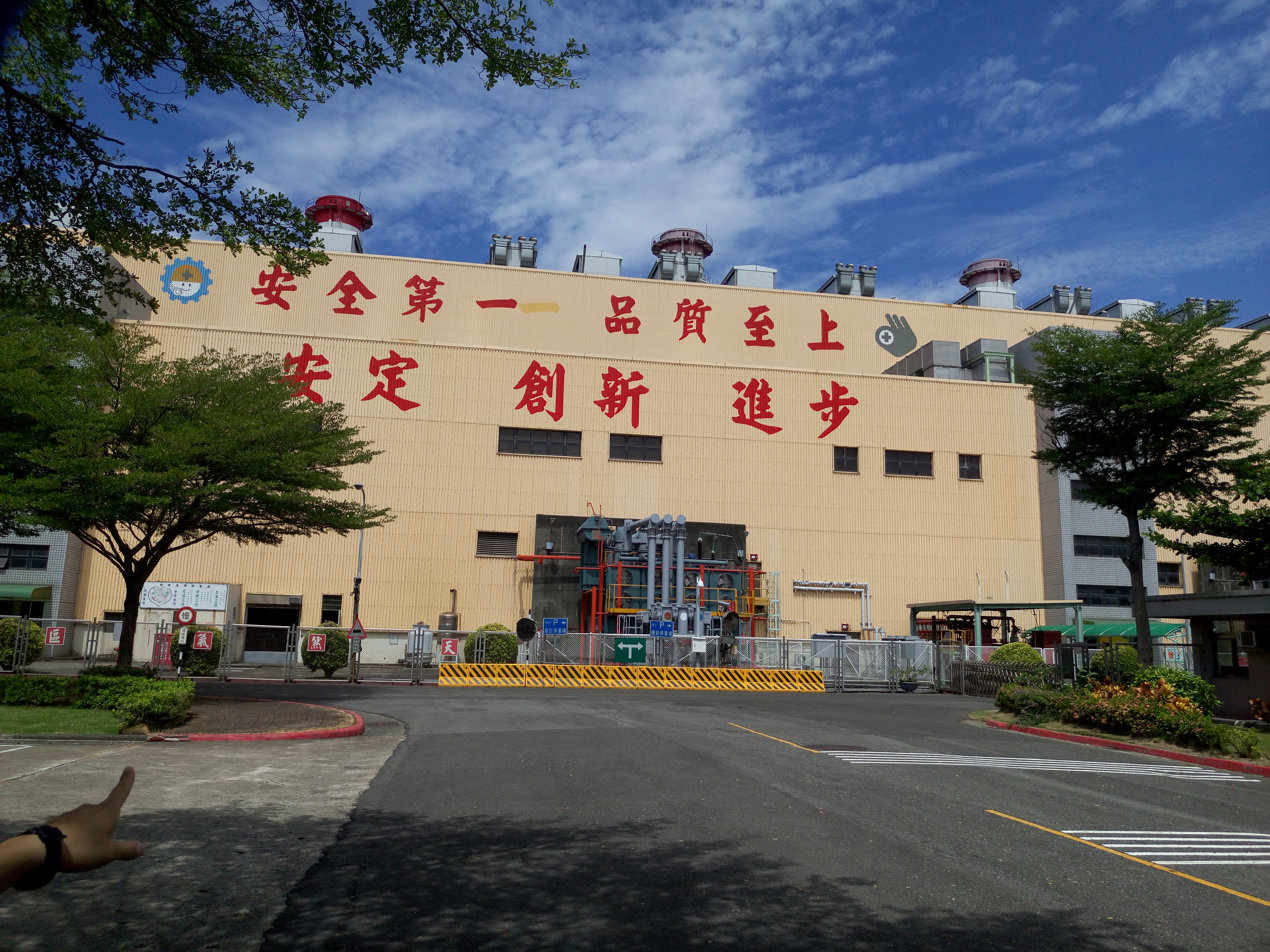
- Official name: 南部發電廠
- Country: Republic of China
- Location: Cianjhen, Kaohsiung, Taiwan
- Coordinates: 22°36′3″N 120°18′2″E
- Status: Operational
- Commission date: 1993; June 2003 (Unit 4)
- Owner: Taipower
- Operator: Taipower

Thermal power station
- Primary fuel: Natural gas

Power generation
- Units operational: 4
- Nameplate capacity: 1,118 MW

External links
- Commons: Related media on Commons

The Nanpu Power Plant (traditional Chinese: 南部發電廠; simplified Chinese: 南部发电厂; pinyin: Nánbù Fādiànchǎng) is a gas-fired power plant in Cianjhen District, Kaohsiung, Taiwan. With the installed capacity of 1,118 MW, the plant is Taiwan's third largest gas-fired power plant after Tatan Power Plant and Tunghsiao Power Plant.

== Events ==
=== 30 June 2003 ===
The power plant Unit 4 began commercial operation after performance tests with a total capacity of 248 MW.

=== 4 March 2010 ===
Generators in two units of the plant tripped at 8:18 a.m following the 2010 Kaohsiung earthquakes.

== Awards ==
The power plant won the 2006 Water Conservation Outstanding Performance Awards for its effort in implementing water saving at the plant, especially in the recycling and reusing of boiler drain water and waste water.

== Transportation ==
Nanpu Power Plant is accessible within walking distance South West from Shihjia Station.

It is also accessible within walking distance West from Commerce and Trade Park light rail station of Kaohsiung MRT.

== See also ==
- List of power stations in Taiwan
- Electricity sector in Taiwan
