= Lizihnei light rail station =

Light rail station in Qianzhen, Kaohsiung, Taiwan

Coordinates: 22°36′16.0″N 120°19′28.6″E

Lizihnei C1 籬仔內站
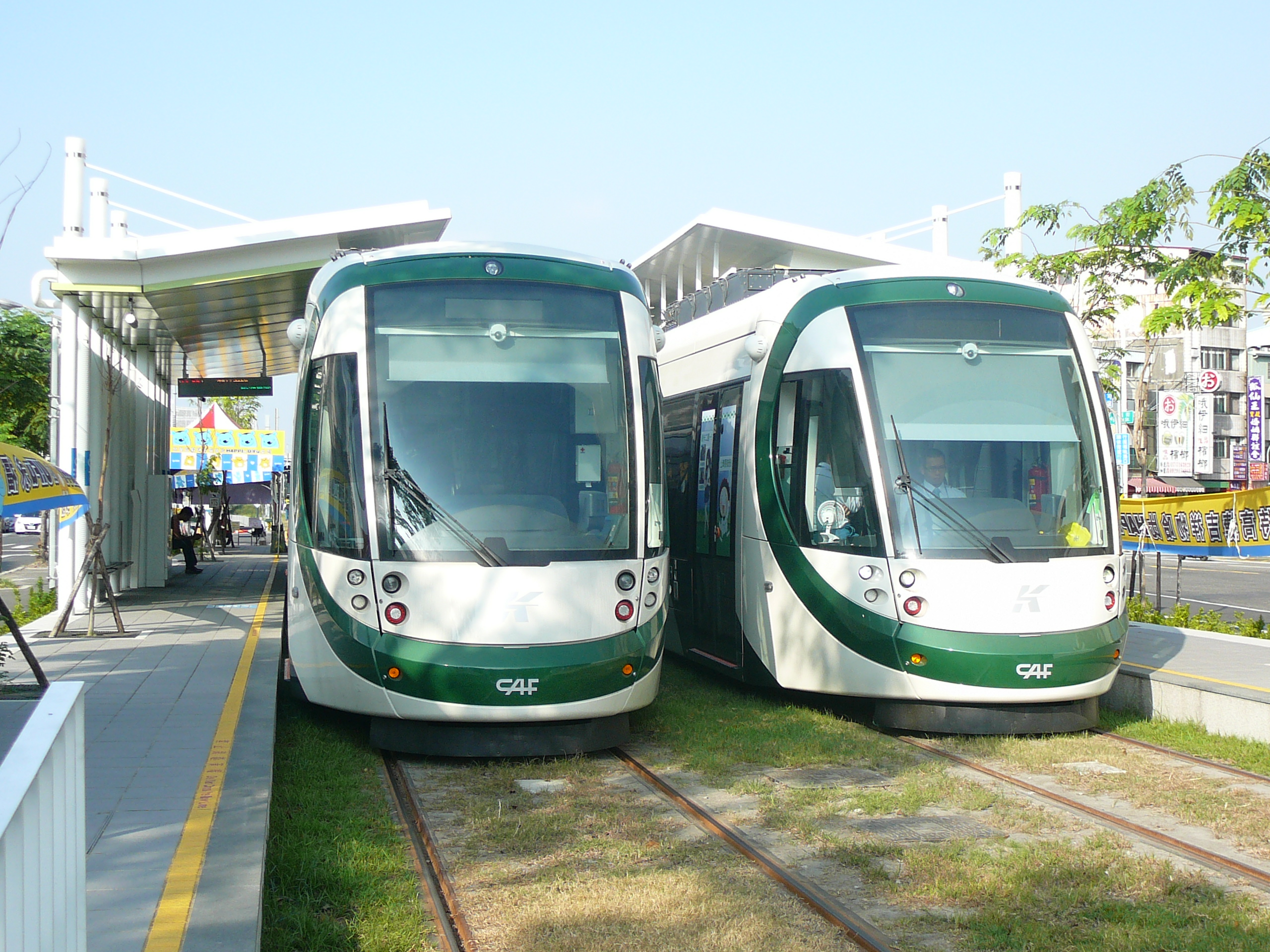

General information
- Location: Cianjhen, Kaohsiung, Taiwan
- Operated by: Kaohsiung Rapid Transit Corporation
- Line: Circular line
- Platforms: 2 side platforms

Other information
- Station code: C1

History
- Opened: 16 October 2015

Services
Preceding station	Kaohsiung Metro	Following station
LRT Depot outer loop / anticlockwise	Circular light rail	Kaisyuan Rueitian inner loop / clockwise
Location

Lizihnei station (Chinese: 籬仔內站; Tongyong Pinyin: Lízǐhnèi Jhàn; Pe̍h-ōe-jī: Lî-á-lāi) is a station on the Circular light rail line of Kaohsiung Metro. It is located in Cianjhen District, Kaohsiung, Taiwan.

== Station design ==
This is a street-level station with two side platforms.

== History ==
On 4 June 2013, construction of stations C1-14 and the first phase of the circular light rail project began. The intersection where the station is located, Kaisyuan/Yixin Rd (凱旋一心路口), was used as a placeholder name during tests. In 2015, a public vote was held by Kaohsiung City Government, and on 29 March the station was named Lizihnei (籬仔內) after the bordering Lizihnei neighbourhood. The station officially opened and began operation on 16 October.

== Around the station ==
- Kaohsiung Municipal Ruei-Siang Senior High School
- Qianzhen Civil Sports Center
- Lizinei Park
- Wu Jia Ziqiang Night Market
