= Cianjhen District =

District in Kaohsiung, Taiwan

Coordinates: 22.60062°N 120.314785°E

Cianjhen 前鎭區 Qianzhen
- District
- Cianjhen District (Note: Use of the term Cianjhen in various contexts: Academia: Domestic/ International; Government: Central/ Municipal/ District/ International; Journalism: Domestic/ International)
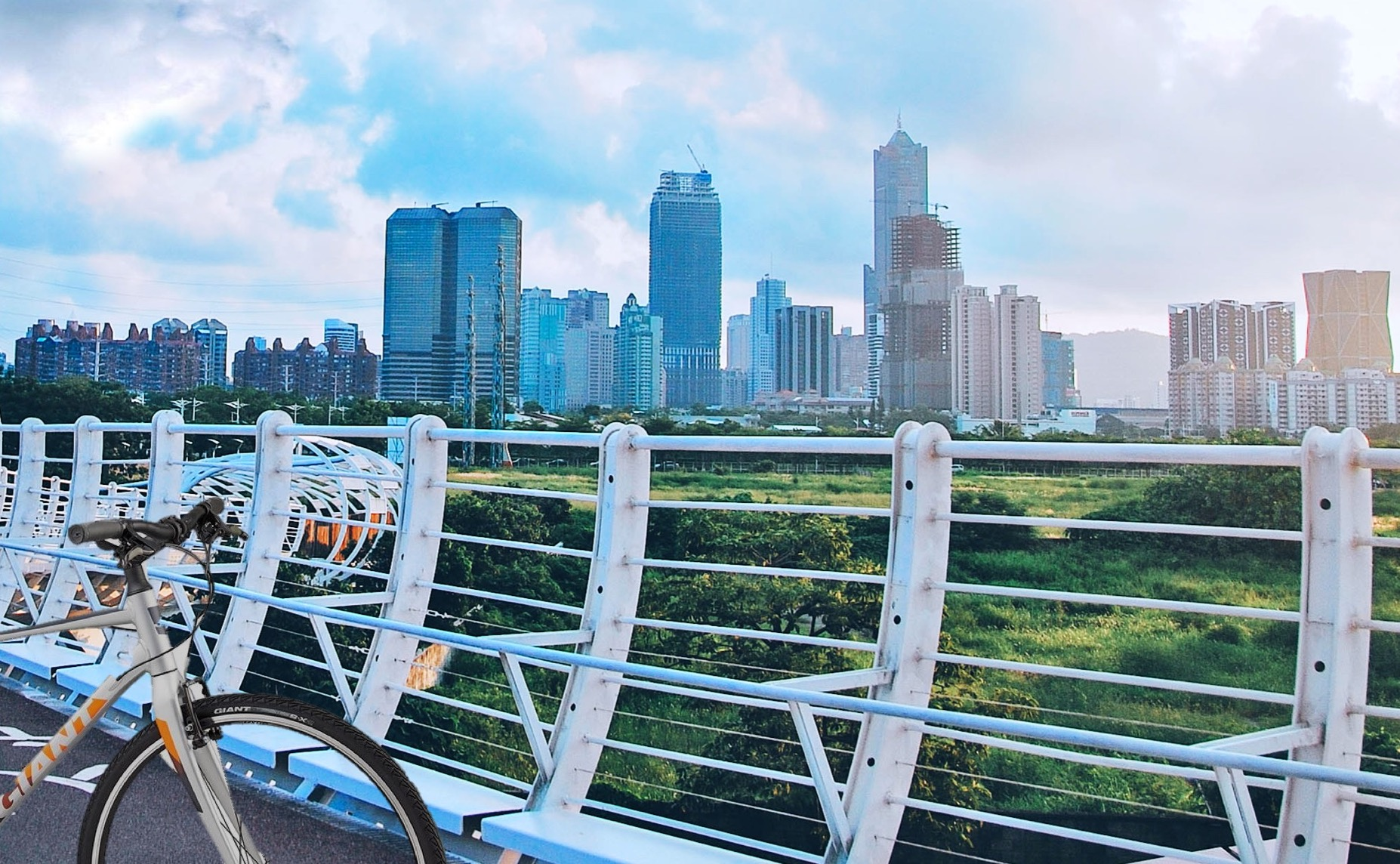
- Skyline of Kaohsiung viewed from Cianjhen Star

- 前鎭 Cianjhen

- Cianjhen District in Kaohsiung City
- Country: Taiwan
- City: Kaohsiung

Population (October 2023)
  - Total: 180,097
- Website: kccdo.kcg.gov.tw/en/ (in English)

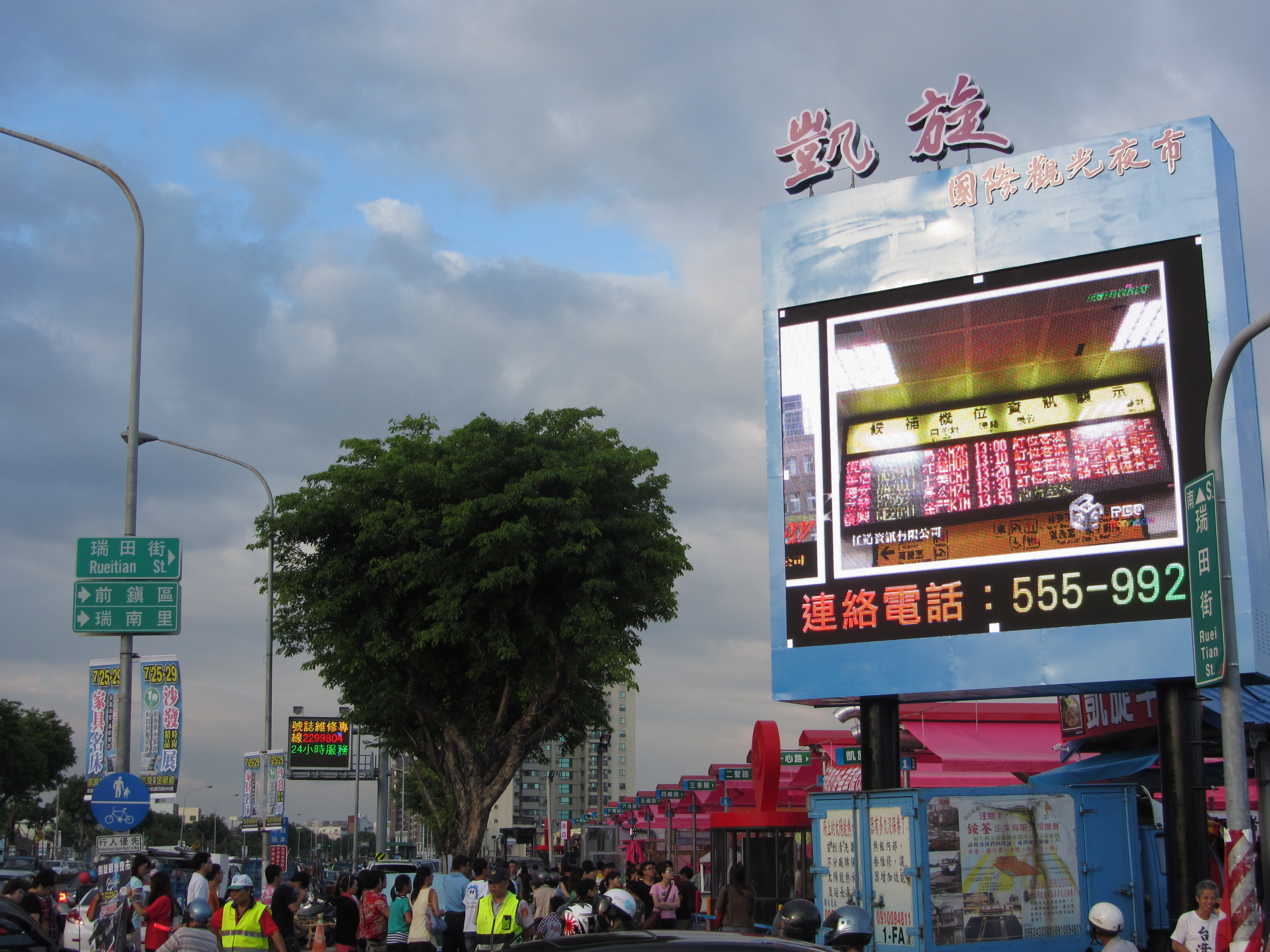
Kaisyuan Night Market

Cianjhen District (Chinese: 前鎭區; Hanyu Pinyin: qiánzhèn qū; Tongyong Pinyin: Ciánjhèn Cyu; Wade–Giles: Ch'ien^{2}-chên^{4} Ch'ü^{1}) is a district in Kaohsiung City, Taiwan. It covers an area of 19.1207 km^{2} (7.3825 sq mi) and is subdivided into 59 villages. The district has a population is 180,097, as of October 2023. It is the fifth-most populated district in Kaohsiung, with a population density of 9,457 people per square kilometer, or 24,494 people per square mile.

== History ==
On July 31, 2014, the 2014 Kaohsiung gas explosions occurred in the district and in nearby Lingya District.

== Administrative divisions ==
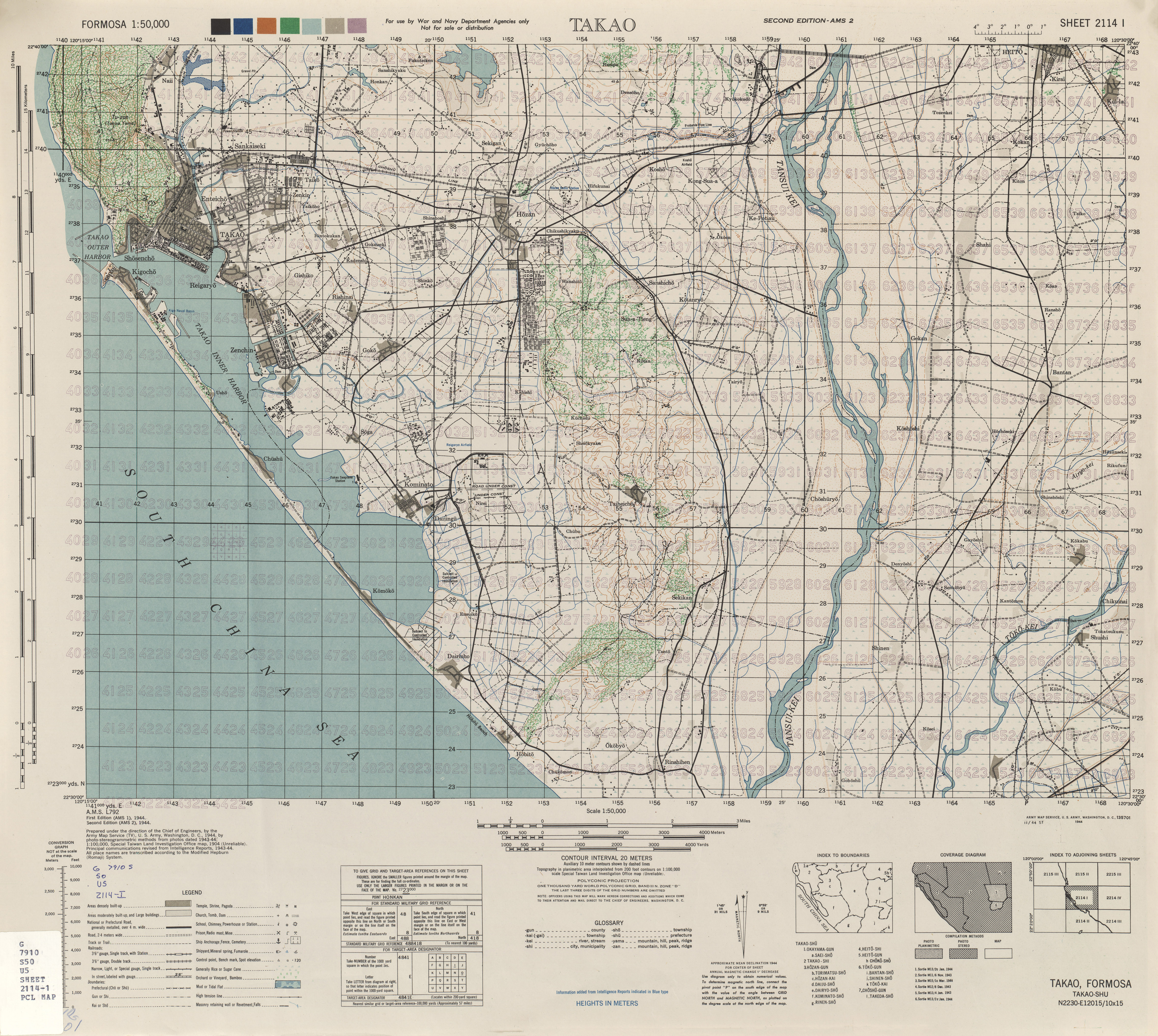
Map including Zenchin (present-day Cianjhen District area) (AMS, 1944)

The district consists of Caoya, Mingxiao, Mingzheng, Mingyi, Renai, Dechang, Pingdeng, Pingchang, Mingli, Xinyi, Xinde, Mingdao, Xinghua, Xingren, Qianzhen, Zhentung, Zhenrong, Zhenchang, Zhenhai, Zhenyang, Xingbang, Zhenzhong, Zhenbei, Zhongchun, Zhongcheng, Xishan, Minquan, Jianlong, Zhenxing, Lianghe, Xijia, Chengxing, Chengfeng, Xingzhong, Xingtung, Zhongxiao, Fuguo, Zhunei, Zhutung, Zhunan, Zhubei, Zhuxi, Zhuzhong, Ruizhu, Ruinan, Ruifeng, Ruixiang, Ruitung, Ruihe, Ruiping, Ruilong, Ruibei, Ruixi, Ruigang, Ruixing, Ruicheng, Ruiwen, Ruihua and Ruichang villages.

== Government agencies ==
- Fisheries Agency
- National Academy of Marine Research
- Ocean Affairs Council
- Southern Backup Center of Central Emergency Operation Center

== Education ==
- Kaohsiung Municipal Ruei-Siang Senior High School

== Infrastructure ==
- Nanpu Power Plant

== Tourist attractions ==
- Dream Mall
- Guanghua Night Market
- Jin-Zuan Night Market
- Kaisyuan Night Market
- Kaohsiung Exhibition Center
- Kaohsiung Museum of Fisheries Civilization
- Taroko Park
- Bao An Temple
- Chia Jhen Park
- Ciao Ya Jhao Yang Temple
- Da Cheng Temple
- Er Sheng Park
- Fo Gong Tien Ho Temple
- Gang Shan Zih Park
- Gao Cie Jin Luan Temple
- Guang Ji Temple
- Jhen Nan Temple
- Jhen Sian Temple
- Labor Park
- Long Feng Temple
- Min Chuan Park
- Ming Sing Fo Temple
- Ming Sin She Jing Shan Temple
- Sheng Sing Park
- Sheng Tien Temple
- Shuai Sing Fo Temple
- Sian De Temple
- Sin Che Chan Temple
- Sing Ren Park
- Yi-Guan Dao Tian Tai Sheng Temple

== Transportation ==
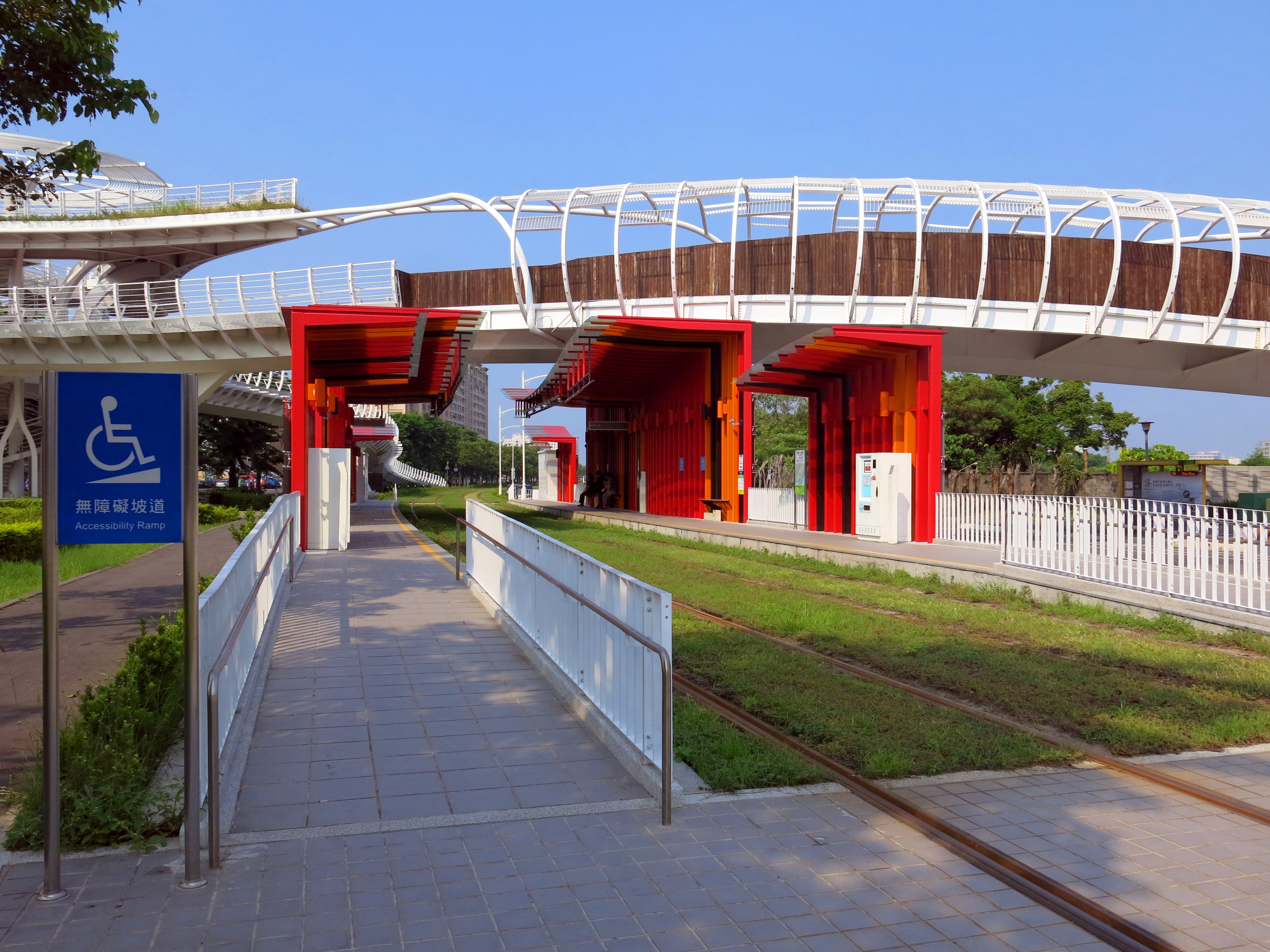
Cianjhen Star LRT station

Cianjhen is served by the following metro stations:

- Kaohsiung MRT: Caoya, Cianjhen Senior High School, Kaisyuan, Sanduo Shopping District and Shihjia
- Kaohsiung LRT: Cianjhen Star, Lizihnei

Cianjhen is the southern terminus of Freeway 1, while Provincial Highway 17 also runs through the district.

== Notable natives ==
- Yen Teh-fa, Minister of National Defense
- Huang Ching-ya, local politician

== See also ==
- Chienchen River
- China Steel Corporation Headquarters
- Farglory THE ONE skyscraper
