= Kaohsiung Rapid Transit Corporation =

Corporation in Taiwan

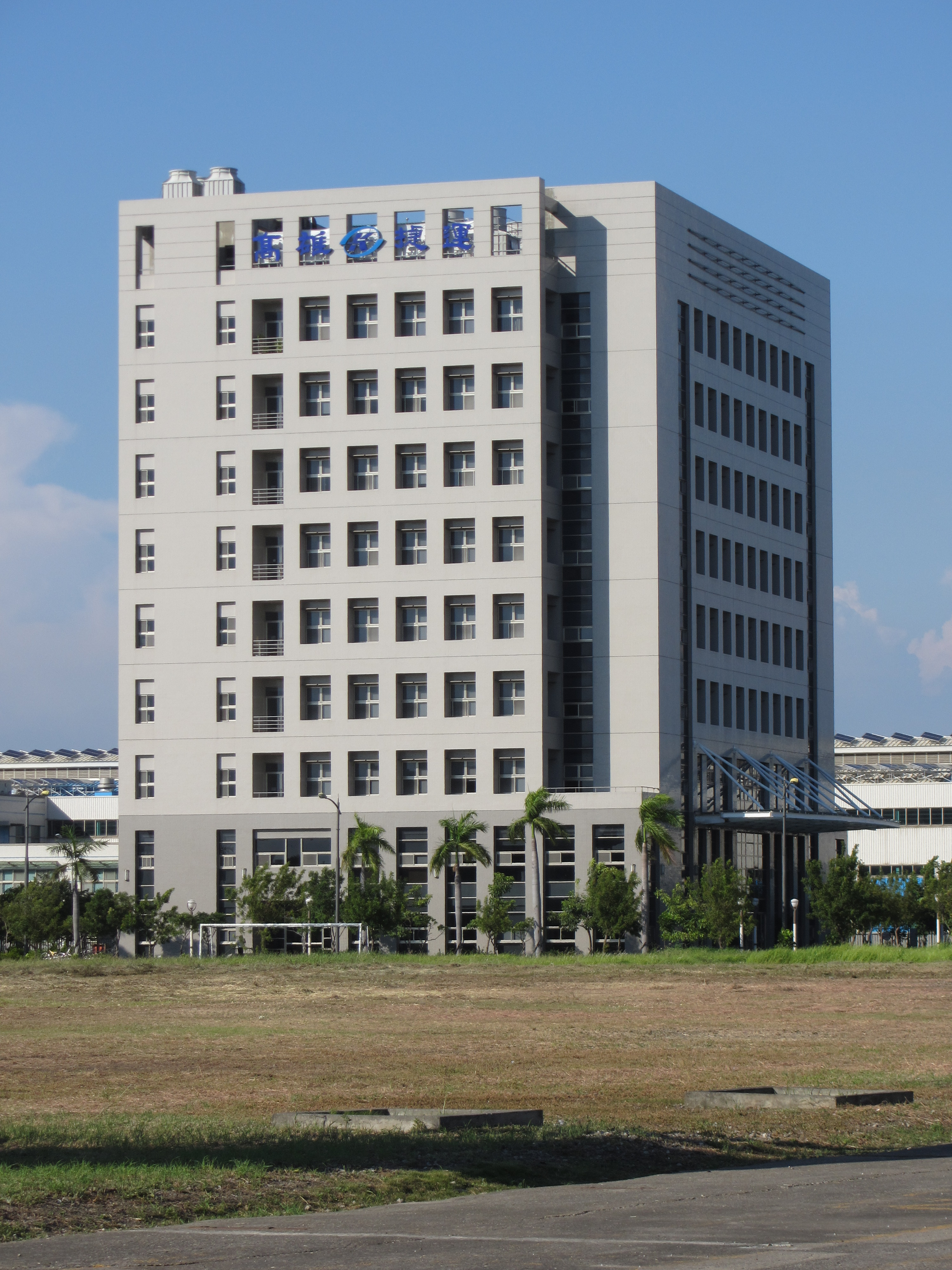
- KRTC Headquarters
- Native name: 高雄捷運股份有限公司
- Romanized name: Gāoxióng Jiéyùn Gǔfèn Yǒuxiàn Gōngsī
- Industry: Rail transport
- Founded: 28 December 2000; 25 years ago in Kaohsiung
- Headquarters: Cianjhen, Kaohsiung, Taiwan
- Key people: C.S. Hao (chairperson); S. Ho (president)
- Services: Transportation
- Website: www.krtco.com.tw

The Kaohsiung Rapid Transit Corporation (KRTC; Traditional Chinese: 高雄捷運股份有限公司; pinyin: Gāoxióng Jiéyùn Gǔfèn Yǒuxiàn Gōngsī) is a corporation established by the municipal government of Kaohsiung, Taiwan to build and operate a rapid transit system for the municipality of Kaohsiung.

== History ==
The corporation was established on 1 February 1999. The government signalled the start of this BOT (Build, Operate, Transfer) project with solicitation of private sector investment in the initial phase of a Kaohsiung Rapid Transit System-the Red and Orange Lines Construction Project. This first step demonstrated Kaohsiung Municipal Government's determination to propel Kaohsiung City and County towards a prosperous future. The Kaohsiung Rapid Transit System will not only fulfill a transport function but will also provide the framework and catalyst for the development of the fabric, the economy, and the quality of life of the area, and for the promotion of community life, culture, and art.

China Steel Corporation has been based in Kaohsiung for nearly 30 years. China Steel sponsored the establishment of the provisional office of the Kaohsiung Rapid Transit Corporation in February 1999 and lodged an application to invest in the project following the solicitation of the Kaohsiung Municipal Government. The main participants in the Kaohsiung Rapid Transit Corporation are: China Steel Corporation, Southeast Cement Corporation, RSEA Engineering Corporation, China Development Industrial Bank, and Industrial Bank of Taiwan.

Following the public appraisal of the applications by the Kaohsiung Municipal Government, Kaohsiung Rapid Transit Corporation was selected on 26 May 1999, as one of the shortlisted applicants. On 10 May 2000, the Corporation was selected as the best applicant and concluded the relevant agreements and protocols with the Kaohsiung Municipal Government in August 2000. The raising of the initial capital stock was completed on 19 December 2000 and an inaugural meeting of the stockholders was held on the same day. Kaohsiung Rapid Transit Corporation obtained a company licence and was registered on 28 December 2000. The Corporation signed the Construction and Operation Agreement and Development Agreement with the Kaohsiung Municipal Government on 12 January 2001.

== Organizational structures ==
- Chairperson
- President
  - Planning Vice President
    - Administration Department
    - Public Affairs Department
    - Purchasing Department
    - Corporate Planning Department
    - Finance and Accounting Department
    - Business and Property Development Department
    - Legal Office
  - Operation Vice President
    - Traffic Operation Department
    - Maintenance Department
    - LRT Operation and Maintenance Department
    - Industrial Safety Department
    - Information Management Office
    - Research and Design Center

== See also ==
- Kaohsiung Metro
