= Sanmin (disambiguation) =

Sanmin is a district of Kaohsiung, Taiwan.

Sanmin may also refer to:

- Sanmin Doctrine, also translated as the "Three Principles of the People"
- Sanmin Park, a park in Songshan District, Taipei, Taiwan
- Sanmin railway station, a railway station in Yuli Township, Hualien County, Taiwan
- Namasia District, formerly Sanmin Township (三民鄉), a district in Kaohsiung City, Taiwan
- Sanmin Village (三民里), a village in Anle District, Keelung City, Taiwan
- Sanmin Village (三民村), a village in Jiaoxi Township, Yilan County, Taiwan
- Sanmin Village (三民村), a village in Mailing Town, Fuchuan Yao Autonomous County, Guangxi, China
- Sanmin Village (三民里), a village in Taoyuan District, Taoyuan City, Taiwan
- Sanmin Village (三民里), a village in Zhongli District, Taoyuan City, Taiwan

== See also ==
- Sanmin Senior High School station, a metro station of Taipei Metro
- Kaohsiung Municipal Sanmin Senior High School
- Nanjing Sanmin metro station, a metro station of Taipei Metro
- Sanming
