= Gushan railway station (Taiwan) =

Railway station in Gushan, Kaohsiung, Taiwan

Gushan 鼓山
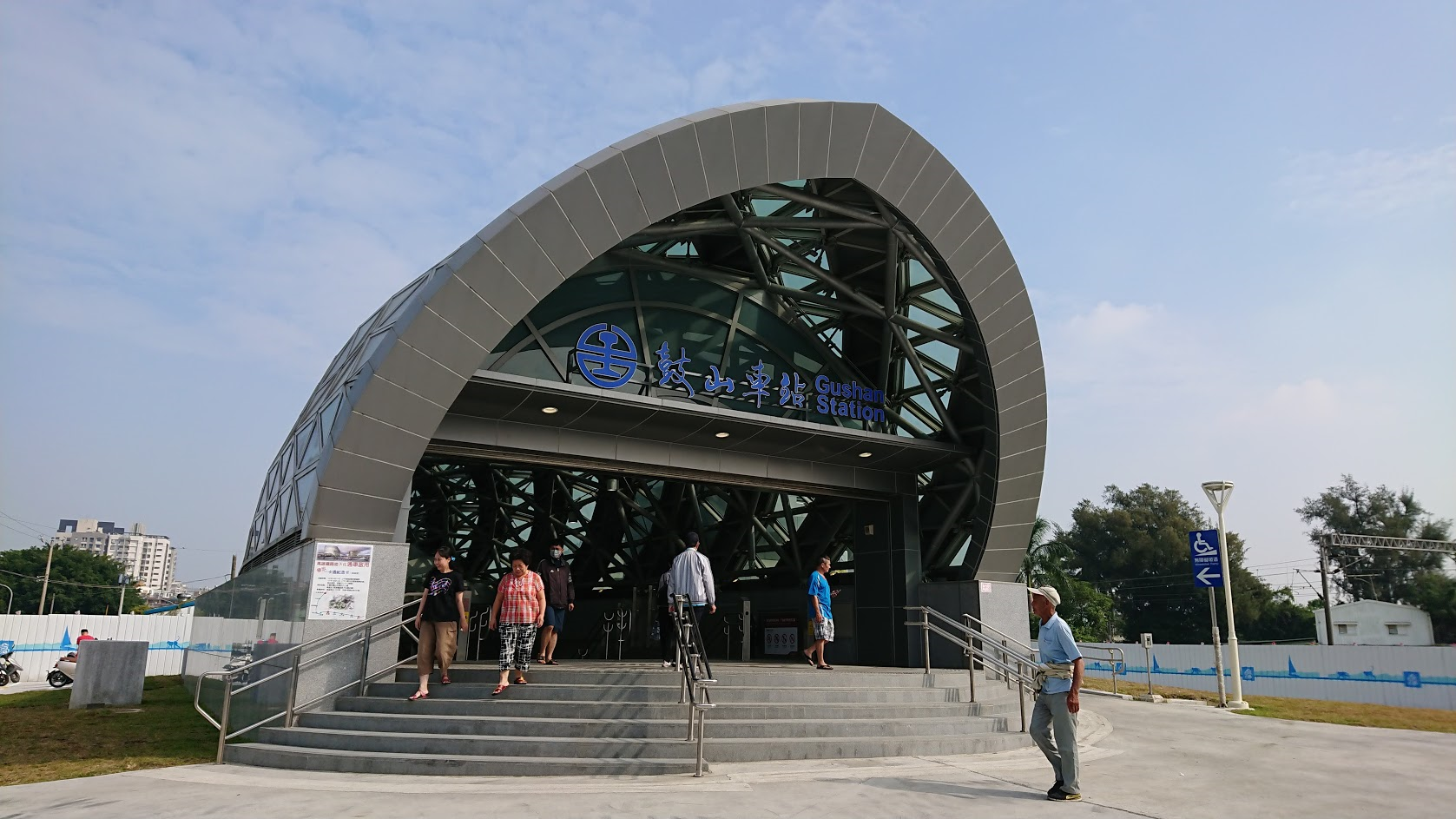

Chinese name
- Traditional Chinese: 鼓山
Transcriptions
Standard Mandarin
- Hanyu Pinyin: Gǔshān
- Bopomofo: ㄍㄨˇ ㄕㄢ

General information
- Location: Gushan, Kaohsiung, Taiwan
- Coordinates: 22.6399°N 120.2813°E
- System: Taiwan Railway railway station
- Line: Western Trunk line
- Distance: 397.3 km to Keelung
- Connections: Local bus

Construction
- Structure type: Underground

History
- Opened: 1929-10-01
- Rebuilt: 2018-10-14
- Electrified: 1979-06-29
- Former names: Tamachi (Japanese: 田町)

Key dates
- 1993: Rebuilt
- 2008-11-09: Passenger services terminated
- 2009-05-13: Closed
- 2018-10-14: Re-opened

Passengers
- 2018: TBA
- Rank: TBA

Services
Preceding station	Taiwan Railway	Following station
Museum of Fine Arts towards Keelung	Western Trunk line	Sankuaicuo towards Kaohsiung
Location
- Location within Kaohsiung Location within Taiwan

Gushan C18 鼓山站
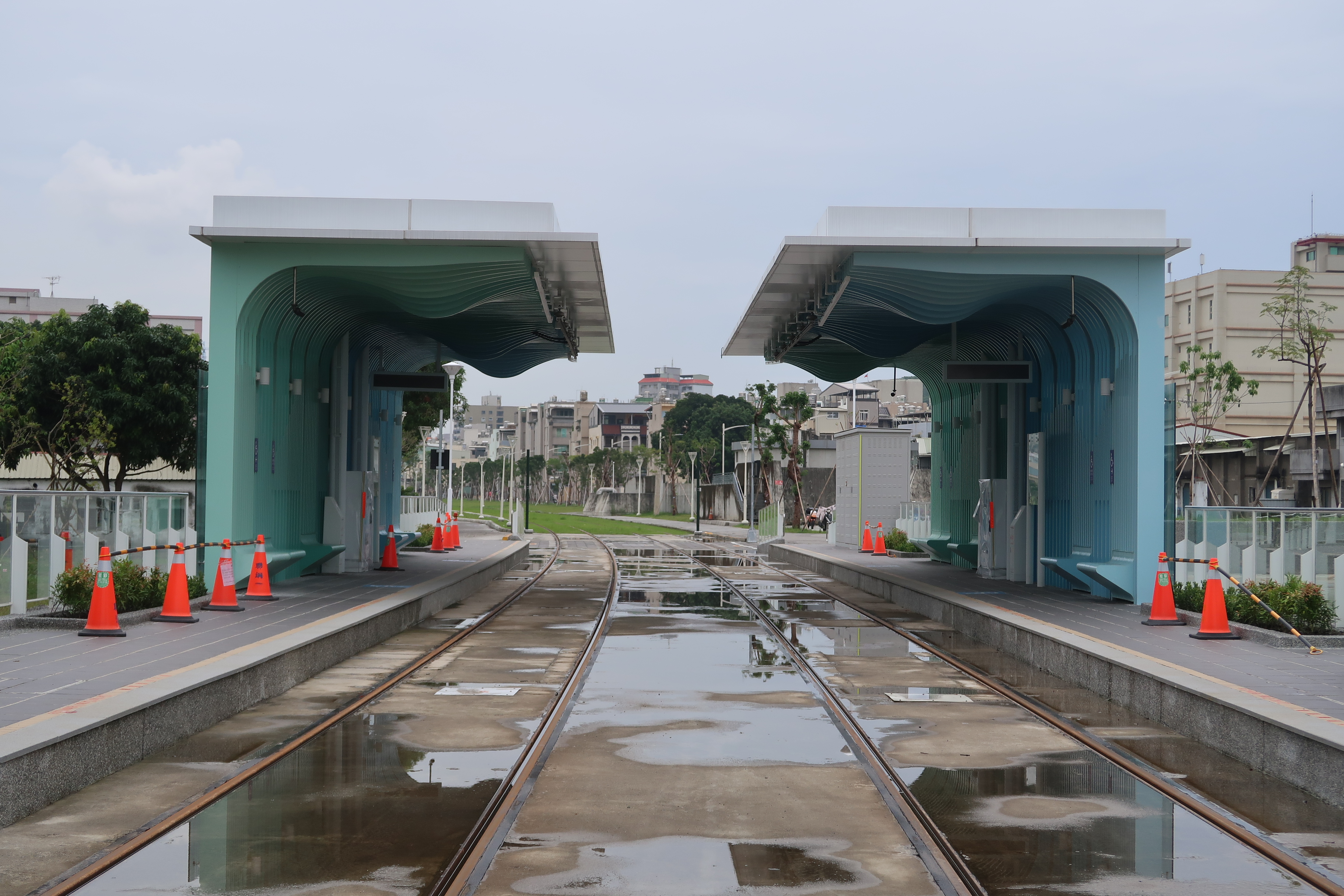

Chinese name
- Traditional Chinese: 鼓山
Transcriptions
Standard Mandarin
- Hanyu Pinyin: Gǔshān
- Bopomofo: ㄍㄨˇ ㄕㄢ

General information
- Location: Gushan, Kaohsiung; Taiwan
- System: Kaohsiung metro station
- Operator: Kaohsiung Rapid Transit Corporation
- Line: Circular Line
- Platforms: 2 side platforms
- Tracks: 2

Construction
- Structure type: At-grade

Other information
- Station code: C18

History
- Opened: December 16, 2021

Services
Preceding station	Kaohsiung Metro	Following station
Gushan District Office outer loop / anticlockwise	Circular light rail	Makadao inner loop / clockwise
Location

Gushan (Chinese: 鼓山; pinyin: Gǔshān) is a railway and light rail station in Gushan District, Kaohsiung, Taiwan served by Taiwan Railway and the Circular Line of the Kaohsiung rapid transit system.

== History ==
On October 1, 1929, Asano Cement Kabushiki Kaisha built Tamachi station as a freight station to transport goods for its nearby concrete plant (later known as Taiwan Cement Kaohsiung Plant). The station was built on the Taiwan Trunk line, northeast from the terminal station of Takao Station.

On June 20, 1941, Takao (Kaohsiung) station was relocated to Sanmin District, and the original location was renamed as Kaohsiung Port Station. To accommodate the relocation, a new junction was built south of Tamachi Station for a new track connecting Sankuaicuo station and the new terminal station for Takao (Kaohsiung) Station.

On April 15, 1950, Tamachi Station was renamed as Gushan station.

On November 9, 2008, passenger services from the station were discontinued. The station was since only serving freight services until the station closed.

On May 13, 2009, the station was closed for the construction of the Kaohsiung Railway Underground Project.

On October 14, 2018, the station was reopened with a new station building after the completion of the Kaohsiung Railway Underground Project. Passenger services were restored.

On December 16, 2021, Gushan Light Rail Station of the Circular Light Rail Line was opened.

== Around the station ==
- Zhongdu Wetlands Park
- Former Tangrong Brick Kiln

== See also ==
- List of railway stations in Taiwan
