= Su Lan-hong =

Taiwanese baseball pitcher

Su Lan-hong (Chinese: 蘇嵐鴻; born 4 March 2007) is a Taiwanese professional baseball pitcher.

== Career ==
Su pitched for the Taiwanese national under-18 baseball team during the 2025 U-18 Baseball World Cup, in which Taiwan won a bronze medal. He pitched 7 1/3 innings in the tournament, recording a 2.46 ERA, and a .192 batting average against with 14 strikeouts and three walks, and also saved the bronze-medal contest. After graduating from Kaohsiung Municipal Sanmin Senior High School, Su signed with the San Diego Padres for $750,000. Su was the second Taiwanese amateur pitcher to be signed by the Padres, following Sung Wen-hua in 2016. Su began his professional baseball career with the Arizona Complex League Padres in May 2026, and was promoted to the Single–A Lake Elsinore Storm the following month.
