= Zuoying railway station =

Railway station in Zuoying, Kaohsiung, Taiwan

Zuoying–Jiucheng 左營·舊城
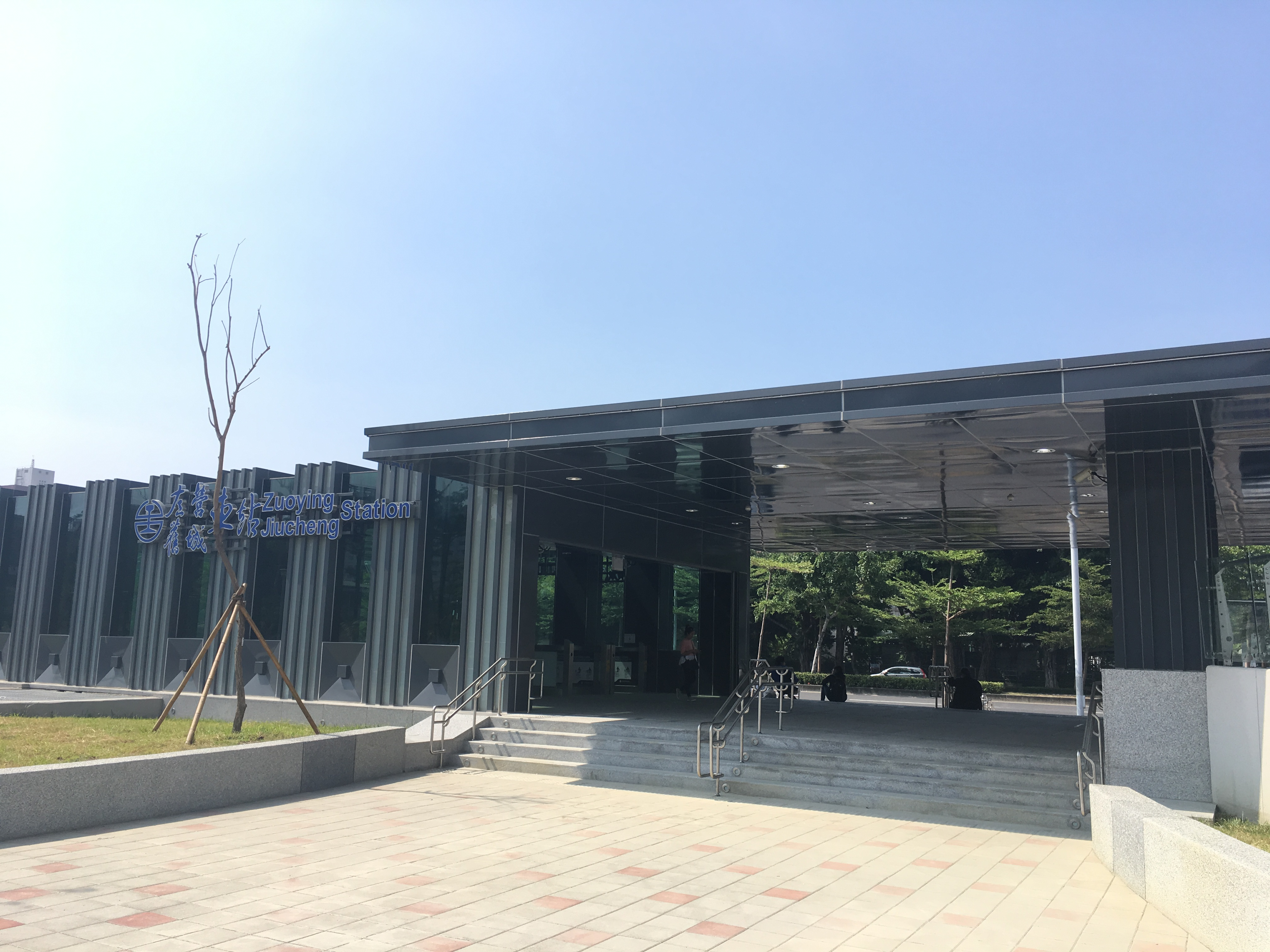

Chinese name
- Traditional Chinese: 左營·舊城
Transcriptions
Standard Mandarin
- Hanyu Pinyin: Zuǒyíng–Jìuchéng
- Bopomofo: ㄗㄨㄛˇ ㄧㄥˊ ㄐㄧㄡˋ ㄔㄥˊ

General information
- Location: Zuoying, Kaohsiung, Taiwan
- Coordinates: 22.6752°N 120.2952°E
- System: Taiwan Railway railway station
- Line: Western Trunk line
- Distance: 393.2 km to Keelung
- Connections: Local bus

Construction
- Structure type: Underground

Other information
- Website: railway.gov.tw/tra-tip-web/tip/tip00H/tipH41/viewStaInfo/4350

History
- Opened: 1900-11-29
- Rebuilt: 2018-10-14
- Electrified: 1979-06-29
- Former names: Jiucheng; Zuoying

Key dates
- 1968-11: Rebuilt
- 2013-03-19: Rebuilt

Passengers
- 2017: 830,176 per year
- Rank: 87 out of 228

Services
Preceding station	Taiwan Railway	Following station
Xinzuoying towards Keelung	Western Trunk line	Neiwei towards Kaohsiung
Location
- Location within Taiwan

Zuoying–Jiucheng (Chinese: 左營·舊城; pinyin: Zuǒyíng–Jìuchéng) is a railway station in Kaohsiung, Taiwan served by Taiwan Railway. The station is served by local trains.

Formerly Zuoying, the station was renamed on October 14, 2018, based on the nearby Old City of Zuoying to avoid the confusion with Xinzuoying, when the new underground station was opened.

== History ==
The station was opened on November 29, 1900. The station was last rebuilt in 2018, replacing the temporary structure opened in 2013.

== Around the station ==
- Chi Ming Palace
- Guomao Community
- Dragon and Tiger Pagodas
- Kaohsiung American School

== See also ==
- List of railway stations in Taiwan
