= Neiwei =

Neiwei may refer to:

- Neiwei (內惟里), Gushan District, Kaohsiung, Taiwan
- Neiwei railway station, a railway station in Gushan District, Kaohsiung, Taiwan
- PAP Internal Guard Corps (Chinese: 内卫部队; pinyin: Nèiwèi Bùduì)
