= Chen Hui-Chiao =

Taiwanese artist

Chen Hui-Chiao (Chinese: 陳慧嶠; pinyin: chén huèi ciáo; born in 1964) is a Taiwanese artist, known for spatial installations. She has been engaged in art creation for more than 20 years, and her exhibitions have attracted attention from the artistic field. She is an active artist in Taiwan's contemporary art development, boasting a rich exhibition history that crosses local and international platforms. Her dedication to artwork has been recognized widely, earning her various awards and acknowledgments in the art field.

== Early life ==
Chen was born in Tamsui, Taiwan, in 1964. She graduated from the Department of Fine Arts at Xiehe Youde Senior High School (協和祐德高級中學) in 1982, where she received her art enlightenment. Following her graduation, she worked at an animation company.

During a visit to an exhibition, Chen had the opportunity to meet fellow artists, Lin Shou-Yu (林壽宇) and Tsong Pu (莊普), initiating discussions about her illustrations. They not only became her mentors but also formed a lasting friendship with Chen through this special encounter.

In 1986, Chen took part in the SOCA (Studio of Contemporary Art) Contemporary Art Workshop (SOCA現代藝術工作室), led by the renowned artist Lai Chun-Chun and others, which marked the commencement of her artistic aspirations.

In the autumn of 1988, Chen Hui-Chiao, Tsong Pu, and Liu Ching-Tang finally secured a space for discussions and exhibitions, signaling the birth of IT Park.

In May 2005, Chen was invited to participate in the Glenfiddich Distillery's artist-in-residence program, located in Dufftown, Scotland. She was the first invited Taiwanese artist to participate in this project; she has recommended an artist for the local residency every summer since then. Upon returning to Taiwan, her experience in Scotland transformed her inner exploration.

== Style ==
Influenced by Lin and Tsong’s emphasis on precision and simplicity, as well as their use of geometric techniques, Chen was deeply inspired, prompting her to venture into the exploration of diverse media for her artworks. Chen collects all kinds of materials by intuition, repeatedly conducts rational experiments, and seeks the possibility of creation from daily life. Nails, needles, dried flowers, acrylic, stainless steel plates, and more were used in Chen's works, following numerous practices and experiments, then these elements were applied to the artwork.

In the 1998 joint exhibition, Chen continued to explore the theme of "Dreams." One of the exhibited works, Sleep! My Love…(睡吧!我的愛), became one of Chen's most distinctive creations due to its uniqueness.

Chen has dedicated substantial effort to exploring astrology, mysticism, and dreams. Her post artworks draw inspiration from the realms of dreams, horoscopes, myths, and totems, incorporating these elements into her creative expressions. Chen transforms the imagery of sensibility, vast mythological legends, and romantic starry skies into rational and calm creations, converting the vast universe and complex emotions into artworks.

She also uses ping-pong as her subject matter, utilizing the round form to express subtle internal emotions. The circular shape symbolizes stability and completeness, due to its potential for rolling, it also carries an inherent instability. This approach transforms both the imagery and internal emotions to geometric forms.

== Artworks ==
The themes in her works are dreams, starry skies, myth, astrology, and so on. When she was third year in junior high school, she bought Astrology and You in a bookstore. She started to be interested in astrology during this time, and she deeply explored it in 1995 when she accessed The Astrologer's Handbook to explore the soul of herself. Because of her interest in astrology, she used some concepts to be the theme of her work. As for dreams, she used to say that “the dream is the initiation of her creations.” When she was little, Chen-Hui-Chiao frequently dreamed and would discuss these dreams with her classmates. However, she felt confused because she couldn’t express the romantic illusion of dreams until she accessed installation art, which could show her endless ideas. The important materials she used in her works were needles, threads, cotton, roses, feathers, and ping pong balls, representing her dream images.

=== 1992. Silent ===
Hanging on a wall is a rectangular acrylic box, and the cotton is filled in and fastened by thousands of needles and threads. In front of the rectangular acrylic box is a 180-centimeter Cylinder. Unlike the former, the cylinder is filled with many dry roses, with dozens of needles on each.

When viewers observe the rectangular acrylic box, they might not see the needles, but only threads glistening with a silver light lying among the cotton. It is like they’re in a conversation that describes a deep emotion. As for the cylinder, the roses with needles on them represent the punishment for the heart-breaker and make viewers associate it with the feeling of pain and hurt.

=== 1993. You’re the Rose, I’m the Needle ===
Thousands of fresh red roses are dried and filled with sharp needles, forming a "beautiful hedgehog" which is scattered on a glass tabletop, even on the walls and floor. According to one review, the roses represent love, while the needles represent the strictest will or caprice that can stab the most beautiful part of your life.

=== 1995. The Weightless Boulder ===
==== In the exhibition Separate Reality ====
Combining one side of the stainless steel square box with the box filled with glass. The hard and cold stainless steel and glass cases stand out against the lightness of the feathers. Feathers should fly in the sky, but the creator makes them trapped in the sealed box. It is this contradiction that makes these elements bring out each other and express this work.

=== 1997. After the pieces Within Me, Without Me in Space, Within Space ===
==== In the exhibition Smiles of the Skeptic ====
Chen Hui-Chiao used water as the material of this creation. There are four large, transparent glass light boxes filled with water, with slides printed with clouds placed under the water. The flowing water and the clouds in the sky are put into a glass box, limiting their original freedom. The water and the clouds represent beautiful illusions, and the writer chooses to imprison them in his work, not letting them dissipate.

=== 1998. Sleep! My Love ===
This work is composed of a bed covered in soft synthetic fiber fleece with dozens of needles sticking out from the bed. The needles are arranged in such a way that running your hand down the bed, from top to bottom, your hand would pass over them without harm. However, to run your hand in reverse would involve being pricked by many of the needles.

=== 2006. Bubbles of Perception - In The End is the Beginning ===
==== In the exhibition Here and Now ====
The major material of this work is thousands of ping pong balls, and this image Includes a bed wrapped in a comforter with orange ping pong balls, pearls, and sequins. Those are the major materials of this work.

The sphere of consciousness seems to be growing and spreading, and the mattress, which welcomes and sends away life, becomes the symbol of both the beginning and the end at the same time. In addition, the work also implies that people are in the state of half asleep and half awake.

=== 2008. Double Flame ===
==== In the exhibition The Double Flame ====
The materials of this work are red velvet, embroidery color cord, and metal cords of gold and silver. This work is composed of two banners, one large and one small. On the small banner, there is the rose image knitted on it. In the large banner, Chen Hui-Chiao knitted the gold and silver metal cord on the right side and a blue cord and Trigrams of the Wind and Fire Family on the left.

The name of this work refers to the book written by Octavio Paz. However, Double Flame is a book that focuses on lust and love, and the author expresses strong emotions in a concise text, her double means that although she looks rough in appearance, she still craves warmth and emotion in the inner.

=== 2011. Seven Days and Night ===
==== In the exhibition The Geometry of Passion ====
In this creation, she placed seven ping pong balls on a monochromatic black platform and lined them up horizontally and equidistant from each other, with one of the platforms intentionally lowered and placed the ping pong ball in black to represents the concept of seven days and one night.

The ping-pong ball represents a planet in the celestial body, and the state of the ball in motion is also a metaphor for the reform movement, which refers to the important driving force for the development of social civilization. Chen Hui-Chiao extends the concept of balls to respond to the state of existence of the spirit and the mind.

=== 2012. Clouds ===
==== In the exhibition Beyond the Tree ====
This work is composed of twelve 12 pink inflatable sofas and a silver airplane flying in the clouds hangs on the wall. This work is the realization of the imagination of her freedom or dreams. It brings the pleasure of relaxing in softness, comfort, and oblivion to those who access it. In addition, twelve sofas imply the 12 signs of the zodiacs in astrology, which the artist has studied deeply and has been using to understand the self and the world in order to reflect the process of life.

== Exhibition ==
=== Silent, IT Park Gallery, Taipei, Taiwan, 1992 ===
The major materials of the works in this exhibition are needles and threads, and the theme is the exploration of the subconscious, which is the orientation of her early works.

=== A Separate Reality, IT Park Gallery, Taipei, Taiwan, 1995 ===
She used many stainless steel plates and pressure-sensitive materials in this exhibition to create her works. In addition, because of her teacher’s influence and inspiration, she applied the element of geometries to compose her creations.

=== Smiles of the Skeptic, IT Park Gallery, Taipei, Taiwan, 1997 ===
In this exhibition, Chen Hui-Chiao had already explored the topic of consciousness with a high degree of awareness. She transformed the earlier exploration of the medium's materiality into a metaphor of consciousness. Although the exhibition cost was more than what she could afford, the reflection was worth and incredible.

=== Here and Now, Museum of Contemporary Arts, Taipei, Taiwan, 2006 ===
There are five works displayed in this exhibition. In addition to using typical materials, such as needles and ping pong, to compose her works, she added some myth and irrational elements to enrich the picture of her works. The irrational elements represent dreams and totems.

=== The Double Flame, IT Park Gallery, Taipei, Taiwan, 2008 ===
In this exhibition, the astrology-obsessed Chen Hui-Chiao brings the mystery of the universe into her paintings, In spite of the theme of mysterious astrology, her works are composed of simple geometric patterns and vertical and horizontal colored lines, and she expresses the romantic legend of the starry sky in a rational way.

=== The Geometry of Passion, Main Trend Gallery, Taipei, Taiwan, 2011 ===
In this exhibition, twelve works are displayed, each with its own astrological meaning. Chen Hui-Chiao made all of them in ping pong and square metal boards and named them after novels, such as the work The God of Small Things, which is related to the novel The God of Small Things.

=== Beyond the Tree, Kuandu Museum of Fine Arts, Taipei, Taiwan,2012 ===
Works in this exhibition were created by simple images, such as clouds, balls, birds, or the ocean to express free sensual association with the stars of the universe that represent stylistic symbols. In addition, Chen Hui-Chiao used the concept of combining poem and image to produce the connection of visual image. Those works are manifested by Electro-embroidery, image output, and installation methods.

=== The Sphere - Apartment of Art, Munich, Germany, 2014 ===
There are eight ping pong and four needleworks of Chen Hui-Chiao displayed in this exhibition. Sphere represents Spinning planets in the celestial sphere; also, Chen Hui-Chiao made it analogous to the relationship between the pitch of a musical scale.

== Recognition ==
=== Honors ===
Since 1987, Chen Hui-Chiao has been experimenting with spatial installations. After the release of You are a rose, I am a needle in 1993, she gained the attention of the art circle in Taiwan, and her installations such as In me, out of me, in the space of space in 1997 and Sleep! My Love... in 1998 have gained her recognition from all professions. Her solo exhibition Here and Now at the Museum of Contemporary Art Taipei in 2006 established her status in contemporary art in Taiwan.

Chen Hui-Chiao is one of the few internationally recognized female artists in Taiwan. Placing two iconic flags in the history of contemporary art in Taiwan. IT PARK, where she serves as program director, is known as the “Driver of Contemporary Art”. Over the past twenty years, she and her friend, Liu Ching-Tang (劉慶堂), have made IT PARK an important base for Taiwan's contemporary art and international exchanges.

Through her construction of an Alice in Wonderland-style mystical cosmology that is unique to her narrative point of view, she has established herself to be a pioneer. Symbolism and metaphors, combined with the sensibility of ready-made objects, express the spirit of harmony in a minimalist form, and create new limits of media. Moreover, her art creation process is also a parable of women's awakening. Through her use of feminine textiles, mainly fleece and sewing needles, she reacts to the humor of removing the mute (mute and unable to speak) of traditional consciousness from the women's community.

=== Awards ===
➤2009 IT PARK received the 13th Taipei Cultural Award from Department of Cultural Affairs, Taipei City Government

➤2004 Taishin Art Annual Observation-Special Performance Award from Taishin Bank Foundation for Arts and Culture

➤1996 “The 7th Osaka International Painting Triennial” Selected from Osaka, Japan

➤1992 “Taipei Biennial of Modern Art” Selected from Taipei Fine Arts Museum

=== Selected public collections ===
➤2012 Kaohsiung Museum of Fine Arts

➤2010 National Taiwan Museum of Fine Arts, Taichung

➤2007 Main Trend Gallery, Taipei

➤2005 Main Trend Gallery, Taipei

➤1998 Hanart Gallery, Hong Kong

➤1998 Taipei Fine Arts Museum

➤1998 Dimension Endowment of Art

➤1997 Galerie Pierre Art Gallery, Taichung

➤1995 PaceWildenstein Gallery Director/Peter Boris, New York

=== Artist residencies ===
➤2005 “Artists at Glenfiddich 05”, The Glenfiddich Distillery, Dufftown, Scotland

➤Since 2006, she has been a long-term consultant of Taiwanese artists in residence at The Glenfiddich Distillery, Dufftown, Scotland.

=== Public arts ===
➤2008 Public Art Commission, Flitting MRT Nangang Exhibition Center Station

➤2005 Public Art Commission, The Fire from Within Taipei Muzha Refuse Incineration Plant

➤2000 Public Art Commission, Starry Moment Taipei City Government

=== Accreditation experiences ===
➤2022 Taipei Art Awards (台北美術獎)

➤2015 Taipei Artist Village (臺北國際藝術村)

➤2013 S-An Aesthetics Award (世安美學獎)

➤National Award for Arts (國家文藝獎)
