= Former Tangrong Brick Kiln =

Kiln in Sanmin, Kaohsiung, Taiwan

Former Tangrong Brick Kiln 中都唐榮磚窯廠
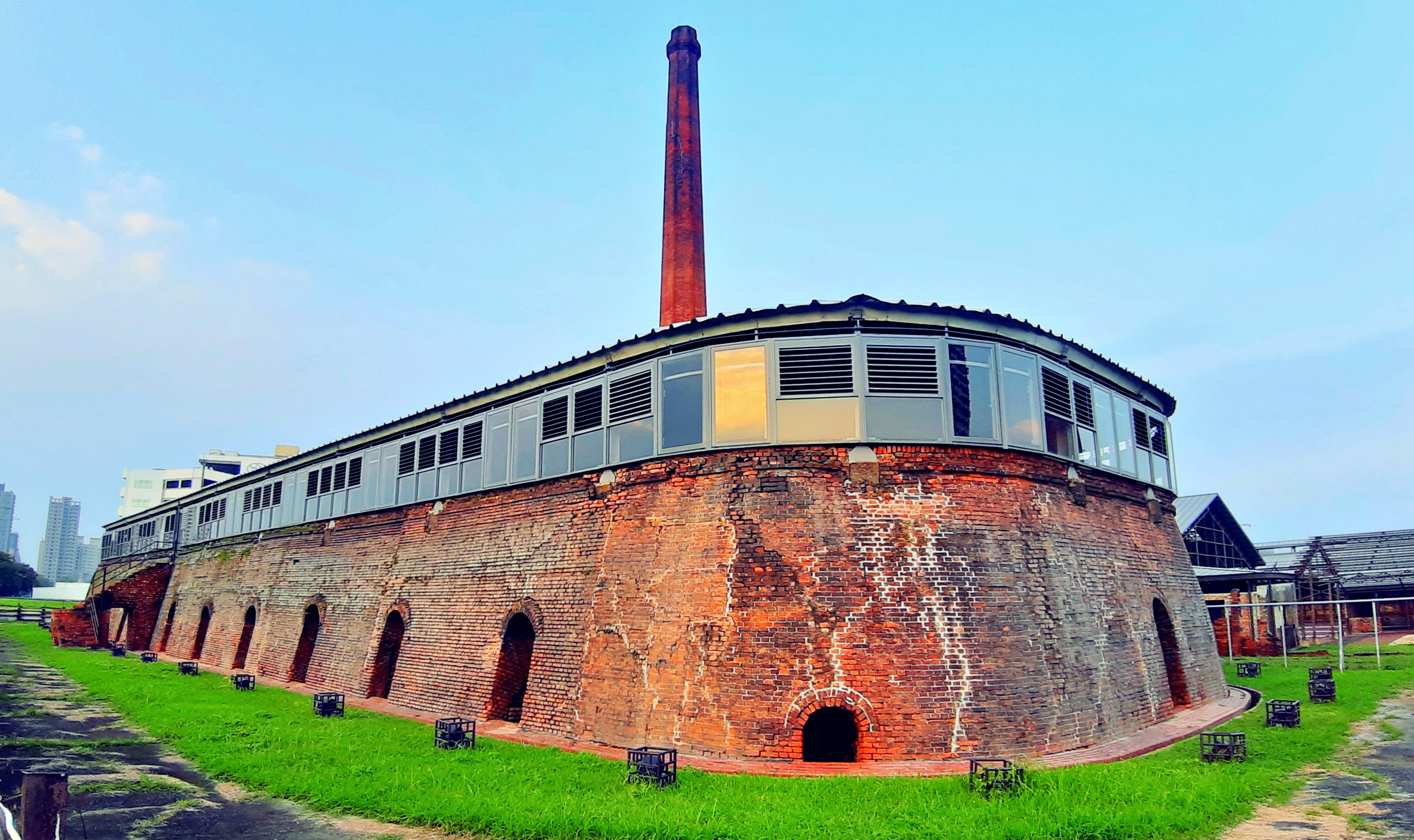
- Built: 1899
- Location: Sanmin, Kaohsiung, Taiwan
- Coordinates: 22°38′30.9″N 120°17′06.0″E
- Products: brick
- Buildings: former kiln
- Defunct: 1985

The Former Tangrong Brick Kiln (traditional Chinese: 中都唐榮磚窯廠; simplified Chinese: 中都唐荣砖窑厂; pinyin: Zhōngdōu Tángróng Zhuānyáochǎng) is a former brick manufacturing factory in Sanmin District, Kaohsiung, Taiwan.

== History ==
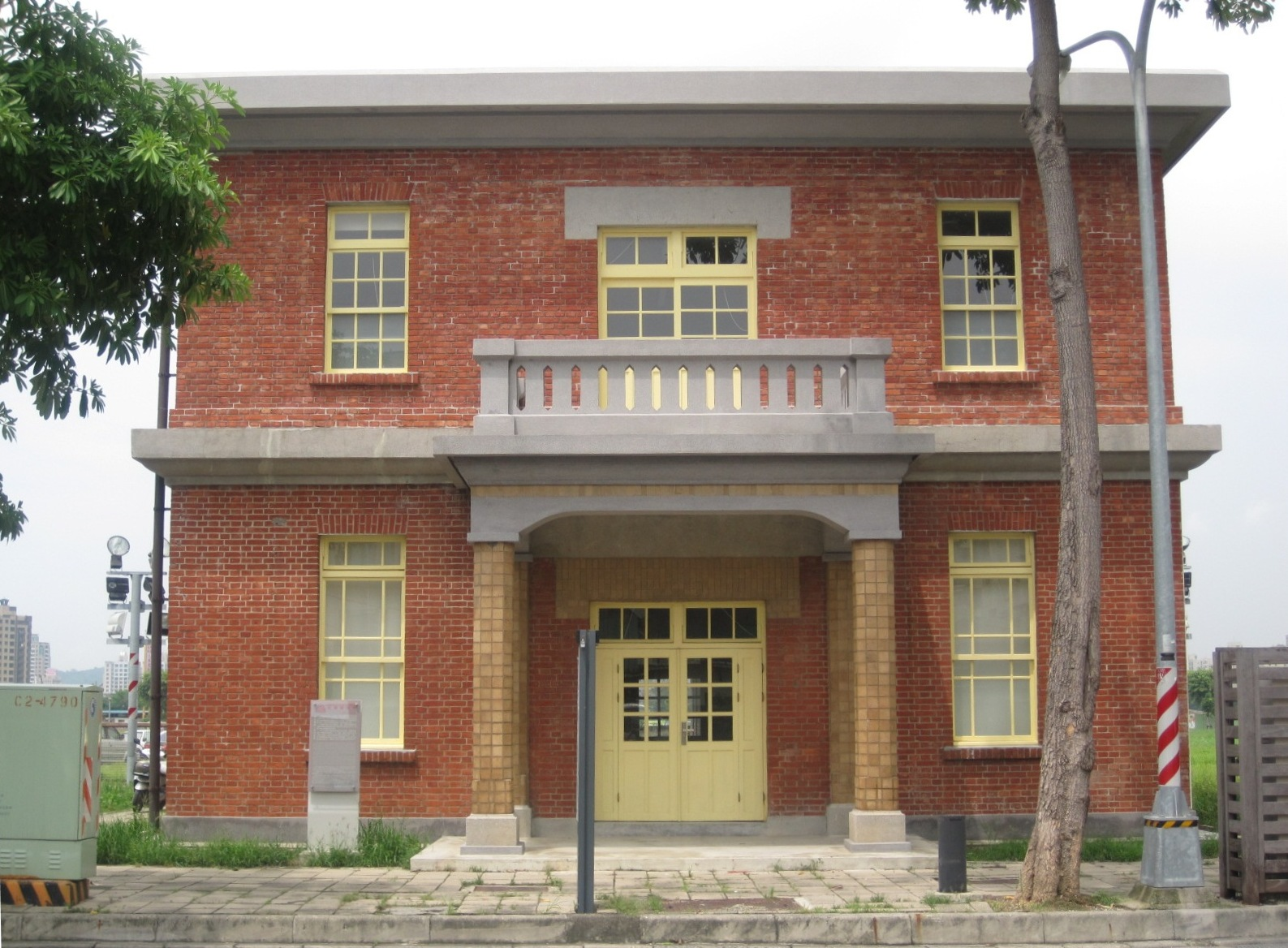
Former Tangrong Brick Kiln administrative building

=== Empire of Japan ===
The building was originally a tile factory established in 1899 by the Japanese government. Latest technology was introduced to this kiln and after around two decades, the brick production in this factory accounted for around 70% of bricks in Taiwan. Demand for bricks grew exponentially as the economy prospered, thus the government integrated all existing kilns in Taiwan in 1913 to form the Taiwan Renga Company (Japanese: 臺灣煉瓦會社打狗工場). Six more kilns capable of high yield bricks were added and the bricks produced here was branded the Taiwan Renga.

=== Republic of China ===
After the handover of Taiwan from Japan to the Republic of China in 1945, Taiwan Renga turned into a state-owned factory and was sold to a private company Tangrong Ironworks. However, after the company financial crisis in 1957, the Ministry of Economic Affairs acquired the factory in 1962. During the period of rapid economic growth, the kiln brought produced high profit for Tangrong but eventually the entire factory was shut down in 1985 due to rising labor costs and environmental concern. Since 2002, the site has remained idle and unoccupied. Its administrative building however was still continue to operate until 2002. In 2005, the site was renovated to be a tourist attraction.

== Transportation ==
The building is accessible within walking distance west from Kaohsiung Main Station.

The building is also accessible within walking distance east from Gushan Station.

== See also ==
- List of tourist attractions in Taiwan
