= Museum of Fine Arts railway station (Taiwan) =

Railway station in Gushan, Kaohsiung, Taiwan

Museum of Fine Arts Station 美術館車站
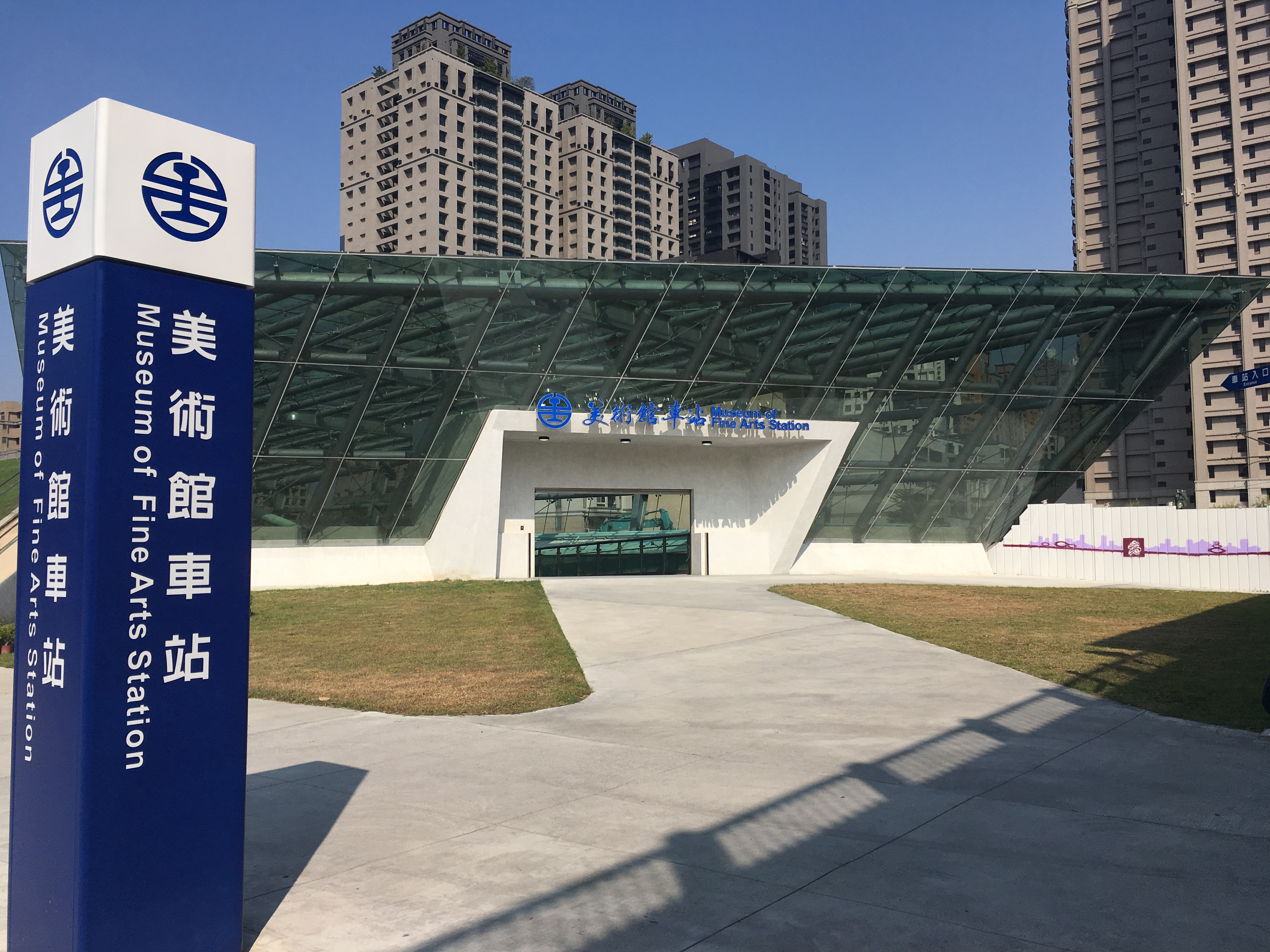

Chinese name
- Traditional Chinese: 美術館車站
Transcriptions
Standard Mandarin
- Hanyu Pinyin: Měishùguǎn Chēzhàn
- Bopomofo: ㄇㄟˇ ㄕㄨˋ ㄍㄨㄢˇ ㄔㄜ ㄓㄢˋ

General information
- Location: Gushan, Kaohsiung; Taiwan
- Coordinates: 22°39′07.5″N 120°16′53.7″E
- System: TR railway station
- Line: West Coast line
- Distance: 396.1 km to Keelung
- Platforms: 2 island platforms
- Connections: Circular light rail

Construction
- Structure type: Underground

Other information
- Station code: 333

History
- Opened: 14 October 2018

Services
Preceding station	Taiwan Railway	Following station
Neiwei towards Keelung	Western Trunk line	Gushan towards Kaohsiung
Location

TRA Museum of Fine Arts Station C20 臺鐵美術館站
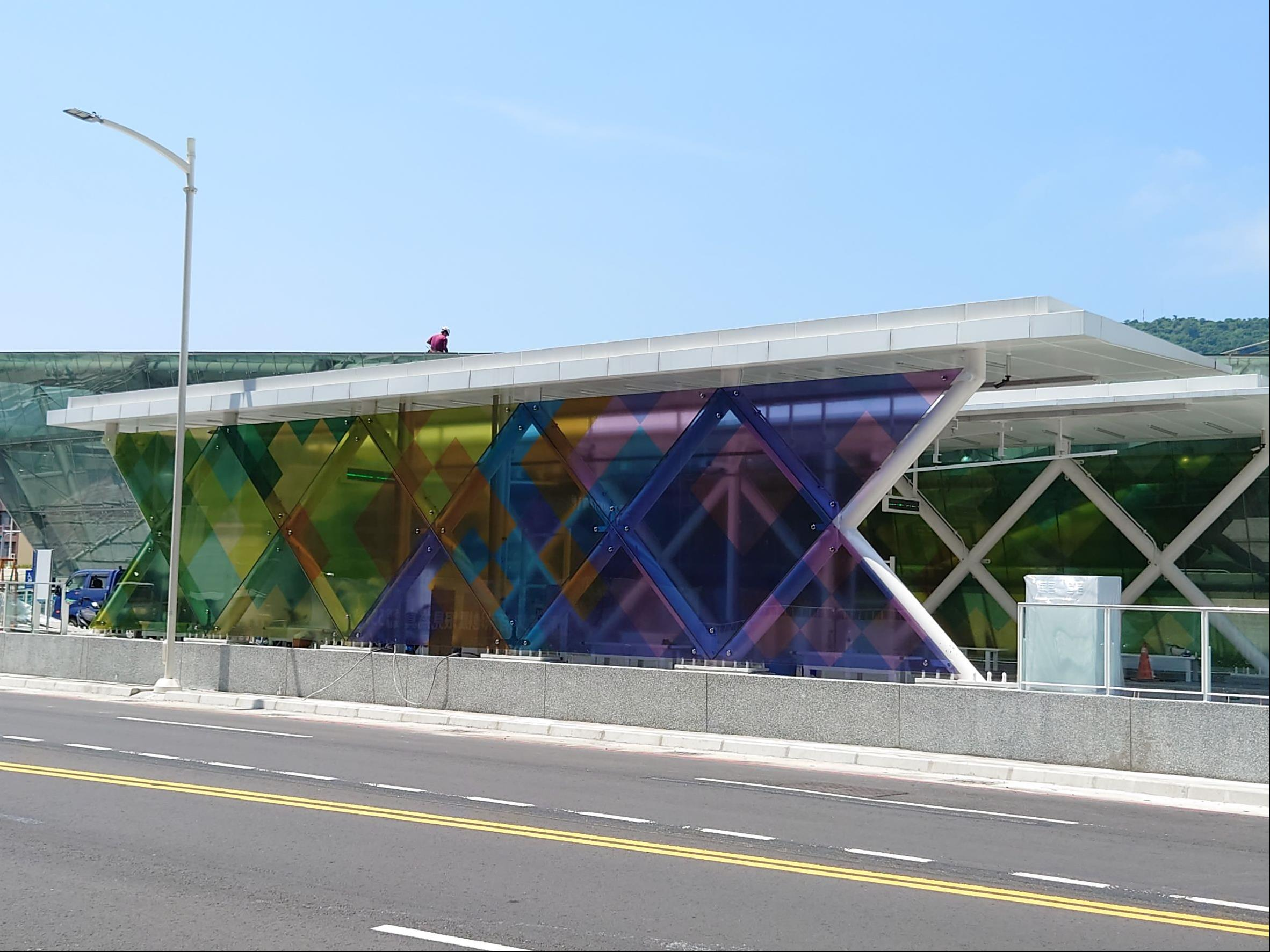

General information
- Location: Gushan, Kaohsiung; Taiwan
- System: Kaohsiung metro station
- Operator: Kaohsiung Rapid Transit Corporation
- Line: Circular Line
- Platforms: 2 side platforms
- Tracks: 2

Construction
- Structure type: At-grade

Other information
- Station code: C20

History
- Opened: December 16, 2021

Services
Preceding station	Kaohsiung Metro	Following station
Makadao outer loop / anticlockwise	Circular light rail	Neiwei Arts Center inner loop / clockwise
Location

Museum of Fine Arts railway station (Chinese: 美術館車站; pinyin: Měishùguǎn Chēzhàn) is a railway and light rail station located in Gushan District, Kaohsiung, Taiwan. It is served by Taiwan Railway and the Circular light rail of the Kaohsiung Metro.

== Station layout ==
Street level	Side platform
Street level	← Circular light rail inner loop / clockwise (Neiwei Arts Center)
Street level	→ Circular light rail outer loop / anticlockwise (Makadao)
Street level	Side platform

== Around the station ==
- Kaohsiung Museum of Fine Arts
