= Liu Cheng-Hsiang =

- 劉呈祥
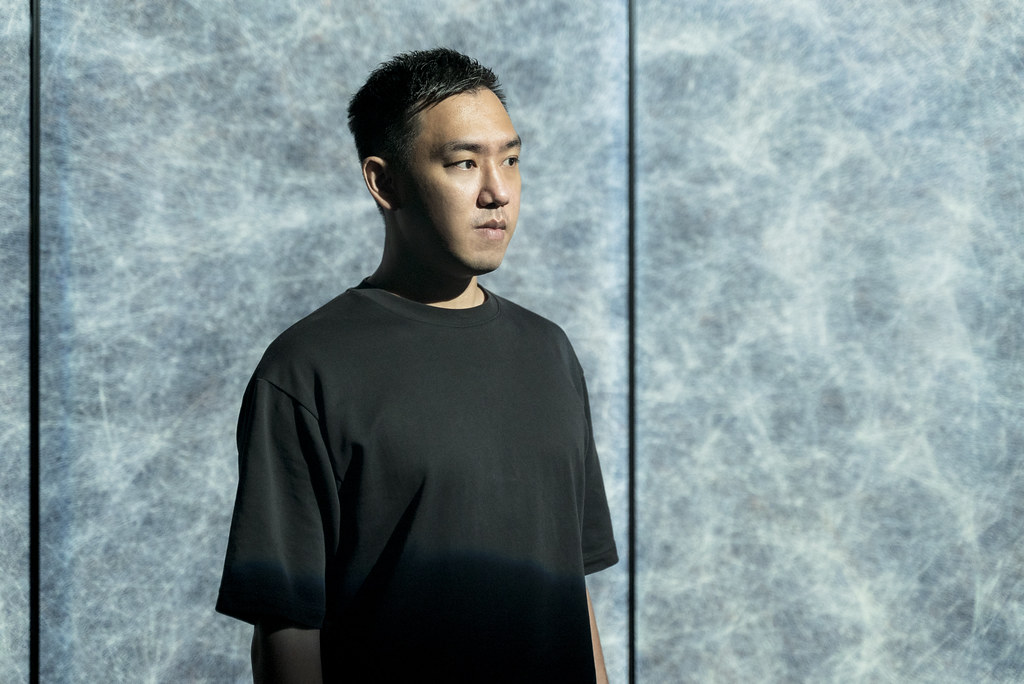
- Liu Cheng-Hsiang (2022)
- Born: 1986 (age 39–40); Taichung, Taiwan
- Education: Department of Architecture, Tamkang University; Bartlett School of Architecture, University College London
- Known for: Visual arts, generative art, photography, video, spatial installation
- Notable work: Cosmos of Thoughts series

Liu Cheng-Hsiang (Chinese: 劉呈祥; born February 11, 1986), also known as Shawn Liu, is a Taiwanese visual artist, born in Taichung. His creative media include algorithmically generated digital imagery, photography, video and spatial installation.

== Life ==
Liu Cheng-Hsiang was born in Taichung, Taiwan, in 1986. In his early years he studied in the Department of Architecture at Tamkang University, and later went to the United Kingdom to study architecture at the Bartlett School of Architecture, University College London.

== Work ==
Liu Cheng-Hsiang's creative media encompass algorithmically generated digital imagery, photography, video and spatial installation, and his works often take the relationship between nature and humans as their theme. In its introduction to his solo exhibition, the Kaohsiung Museum of Fine Arts described the Cosmos of Thoughts as generative art: the artist designs algorithms informed by the generative logic of the natural world and uses code in place of a brush, so that the connection and superimposition of points and lines generate painterly digital images; another series, Build a World in the Eye (築 視界), consists of photographic works depicting architecture and urban landscapes.

A critical essay published in Art Accrediting (藝術認證), the journal of the Kaohsiung Museum of Fine Arts, noted that the core concept of the Cosmos of Thoughts series is to convert digital vector data, through pixelation and dot-matrixing, into analogue signals received by the viewer's optic nerve, and summarised the themes of the "Build in Eyes, Form in Mind" exhibition as "creation", "generation" and "transformation". The essay also held that Liu treats algorithmic programs as tools that assist creation, differing from approaches centred on artificial-intelligence-generated imagery.

=== Chronocosm series ===
Chronocosm is a series that Liu Cheng-Hsiang developed during a 2025 residency in Shanghai. In May 2026, the Swatch Art Peace Hotel presented the series' photographic works, together with the video Traces of Night drawn from nocturnal imagery of Shanghai, at PHOTOFAIRS Shanghai.

== Exhibitions and residencies ==
=== Early solo exhibitions and the Tainan Emerging Art Award ===
In 2019, Liu Cheng-Hsiang was selected as a "Rising Art Star" at the Tainan Emerging Art Award (臺南新藝獎) and took part in that year's themed exhibition "[In]visible Dimensions". From June to July of the same year he held the solo exhibition Fractal Symbiosis (共生的無垠) at the Mizuiro Art Studio in Tainan; and from October to November he held the solo exhibition Utopia in an Instant (瞬息間的烏托邦) at GATHER ART in Kaohsiung.

=== Hong Kong "Cosmos of Thoughts" exhibition ===
In September 2021, the Hong Kong-based Y-LOT Foundation held the touring art exhibition "Cosmos of Thoughts: The Future Drawings" at the V54 mansion in Happy Valley and at Fortune Metropolis, presenting Liu Cheng-Hsiang's cosmos series works, which were created through digital programming and employed the concept of fractals. The Taiwan Contemporary Art Archive lists this Hong Kong trip as a residency under the Po Leung Kuk "V54 Young Artist Residency Programme".

=== Nantes residency and Build in Eyes, Form in Mind ===
In 2022, under an exchange residency programme between the Taipei Artist Village and the Nantes cultural institution le lieu unique, Liu took up residence in Nantes, France, and in February that year held the residency-outcome exhibition une ville, un cosmos at le lieu unique. From January to March 2022 he was also an art fellow at the Nantes Institute for Advanced Study (Institut d'études avancées de Nantes), with a research project titled "Fractal Symbiosis | Cosmos of Thoughts". From May to July 2022, the Gallery for Citizens of the Kaohsiung Museum of Fine Arts held his solo exhibition Build in Eyes, Form in Mind—Liu Cheng-Hsiang, presenting digital algorithmic works, photography, video and spatial installation made since 2016, and including new works from his Nantes residency. The same year he took part in Abstract Kaohsiung, part of the museum's relaunched "Art Kaohsiung" series.

=== Wave of the Now: Kaohsiung 2020s touring exhibition ===
From 2023 to 2024, Liu Cheng-Hsiang took part in the touring exhibition Wave of the Now: Kaohsiung 2020s, organised by the Bureau of Cultural Affairs of the Kaohsiung City Government. The exhibition brought together 21 Kaohsiung contemporary artists and was shown in turn at the Kaohsiung Cultural Center, the Dadun Cultural Center in Taichung, the Tainan Cultural Center, the art museum of the Hsinchu County Cultural Affairs Bureau, and the Changhua County Art Museum.

=== Residencies in Iceland, the Arctic and Italy ===
In 2023, Liu Cheng-Hsiang took part in the artist residency programme of the Baer Art Center in Iceland. In 2024 he joined The Arctic Circle's "2024 Arctic Spring Expedition", an art-and-science residency; and the same year he was in residence at the Bogliasco Foundation in Italy, where his video work Seaside Hill is used on the foundation's website.

=== Residency in Hamburg, Germany ===
From January to March 2025, Liu Cheng-Hsiang received a grant from the culture and media department of Hamburg, Germany, took up residence at the Westwerk art space, and held the solo exhibition Between Locks. According to a report by the German public broadcaster Norddeutscher Rundfunk (NDR) on its television programme Hamburg Journal, the artist received a grant from the cultural authority and moved into Westwerk's studio-cum-residence.

=== Residency in Genalguacil, Spain, and ARCO art fair ===
From September to October 2025, Liu Cheng-Hsiang went to the small-town museum of Genalguacil, in the province of Málaga, Spain, for a creative residency; this was a residency-and-exhibition programme jointly promoted by the Cultural Division of the Taiwan representative office in Spain under the Ministry of Culture and the museum. During the residency he held the solo exhibition The Bones of the Earth, The Breath of Light at the museum. The exhibition featured ten artworks, including five printed images, three television installations and two projection works. The projection works combined imagery generated by artificial intelligence algorithms, projected onto local peridotite rock and charred wood.

In March 2026, under the theme "Scars of Fire, Glimmers of Light", Liu Cheng-Hsiang selected three works from his residency output to take part in the ARCO International Contemporary Art Fair (ARCOmadrid) in Madrid, Spain; the works included Emerging Landscape, Still Light and Light and Stone. According to a report by the Central News Agency, the works respond to the geological memory of the town of Genalguacil through the relationship between light, stone and time. Miguel Ángel Herrera, the mayor of Genalguacil and director of the town museum, told the Central News Agency that being able to present the results of this collaboration on an important art stage in Spain made the locality feel proud.

=== Shanghai residency and PHOTOFAIRS Shanghai ===
From November 2025 to February 2026, Liu Cheng-Hsiang was in residence at the Swatch Art Peace Hotel in Shanghai. In May 2026 the centre presented the Chronocosm series and the video Traces of Night, developed during the residency, at PHOTOFAIRS Shanghai.

== Solo exhibitions ==
- 2019 Fractal Symbiosis, Mizuiro Art Studio, Tainan, Taiwan
- 2019 Utopia in an Instant, GATHER ART, Kaohsiung, Taiwan
- 2022 une ville, un cosmos, le lieu unique, Nantes, France
- 2022 Build in Eyes, Form in Mind—Liu Cheng-Hsiang, Gallery for Citizens, Kaohsiung Museum of Fine Arts, Taiwan
- 2025 Between Locks, Westwerk art space, Hamburg, Germany
- 2025 The Bones of the Earth, The Breath of Light, Genalguacil town museum, Spain

== Residencies and research ==
- 2021 V54 Young Artist Residency Programme, Hong Kong
- 2022 le lieu unique (exchange residency with the Taipei Artist Village), Nantes, France
- 2022 Nantes Institute for Advanced Study, art fellow, Nantes, France
- 2023 Baer Art Center, Iceland
- 2024 The Arctic Circle, Svalbard, Arctic
- 2024 Bogliasco Foundation, Italy
- 2025 Westwerk art space, Hamburg, Germany
- 2025 Genalguacil Pueblo Museo, Spain
- 2025–2026 Swatch Art Peace Hotel, Shanghai, China

== Awards and selections ==
=== International photography awards ===
In 2015, Liu Cheng-Hsiang (under the English name Shawn Liu) won a Silver award at the Prix de la Photographie Paris (PX3) in France for his work Stairs to sky; in 2016 he won another Silver award at the same competition for Dance with architecture. His architectural photograph Geometric proverbs was also selected for the International Photography Awards (IPA) and included in the IPA 2017 annual book.

=== Taiwanese awards and open calls ===
- 2018 Hualien Art Award, selected
- 2018 Miaoli Art Exhibition Biennial, passed preliminary review
- 2018 and 2019 Yilan Award, selected
- 2019 Huangxi Art Exhibition, selected
- 2019 Tainan Emerging Art Award "Rising Art Star", with the work The Cosmos
- 2019 Ministry of Culture 12th "Made In Taiwan—New Artist" selection, exhibited at ART TAIPEI
- 2020 ART FUTURE PRIZE, Asia's rising stars, shortlisted
- 2020 Kaohsiung Award, Honorable Mention, with the work Cosmos of Thoughts | Stargazer
- 2020 National Art Exhibition (printmaking category), selected, with the work Gravity and Genesis | Cosmos of Thoughts
- 2020 3rd "Composition · Taiwan" Visual Art Open Call, Honorable Mention

== Publications ==
Liu Cheng-Hsiang was one of the co-authors of Jian Zhu Bai Jiang: 1684–2020 Classic Kaohsiung Architecture (見築百講：1684-2020高雄經典建築), published by Walkers Cultural in 2021. In 2022, the Kaohsiung Museum of Fine Arts published the exhibition catalogue Gallery for Citizens: Build in Eyes, Form in Mind—Liu Cheng-Hsiang.
