= Old Kaohsiung Station Building =

Museum in Sanmin, Kaohsiung, Taiwan

- 高雄鐵路地下化展示館
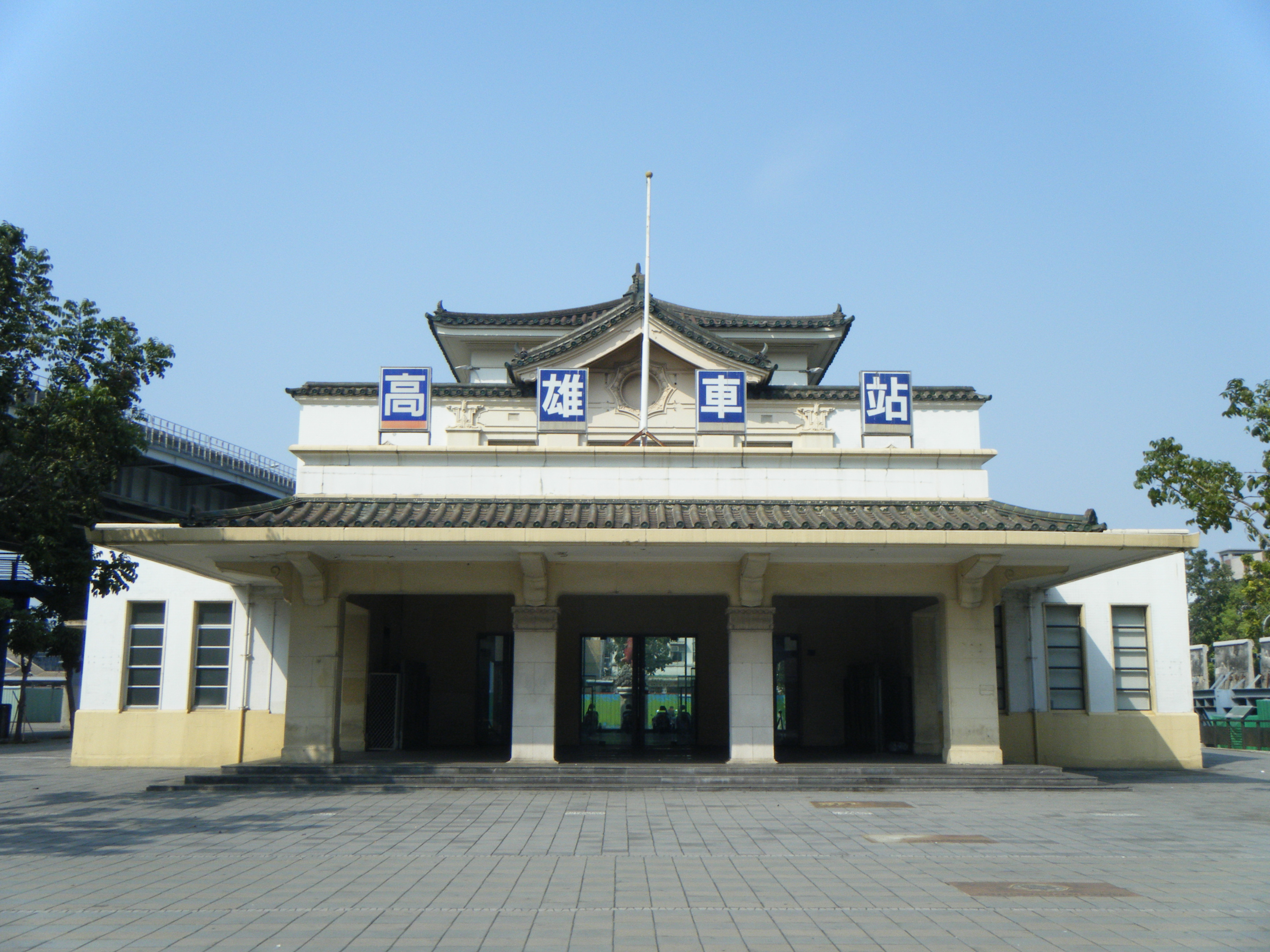
- Former name: Kaohsiung Railway Station
- Location: Sanmin, Kaohsiung, Taiwan
- Type: museum
- Public transit access: Kaohsiung Station

The old Kaohsiung Station building (traditional Chinese: 高雄鐵路地下化展示館; simplified Chinese: 高雄铁路地下化展示馆; pinyin: Gāoxióng Tiělù Dìxià Huà Zhǎnshì Guǎn) is in Sanmin District, Kaohsiung, Taiwan.

== History ==
The building was constructed in 1941 in the Imperial Crown Style by Shimizu Corporation and served as the Kaohsiung Main Station building until 2002. In 2002 the building was temporarily moved in one piece to a new location, but in 2021 was returned to its original location, where it has been incorporated into the new Kaohsiung Main Station.

== Transportation ==
The building is accessible as a centrepiece of the new Kaohsiung Main Station.

== See also ==
- List of museums in Taiwan
