= Sanfong Central Street =

Street in Sanmin, Kaohsiung, Taiwan

- Sanfong Jhong Street
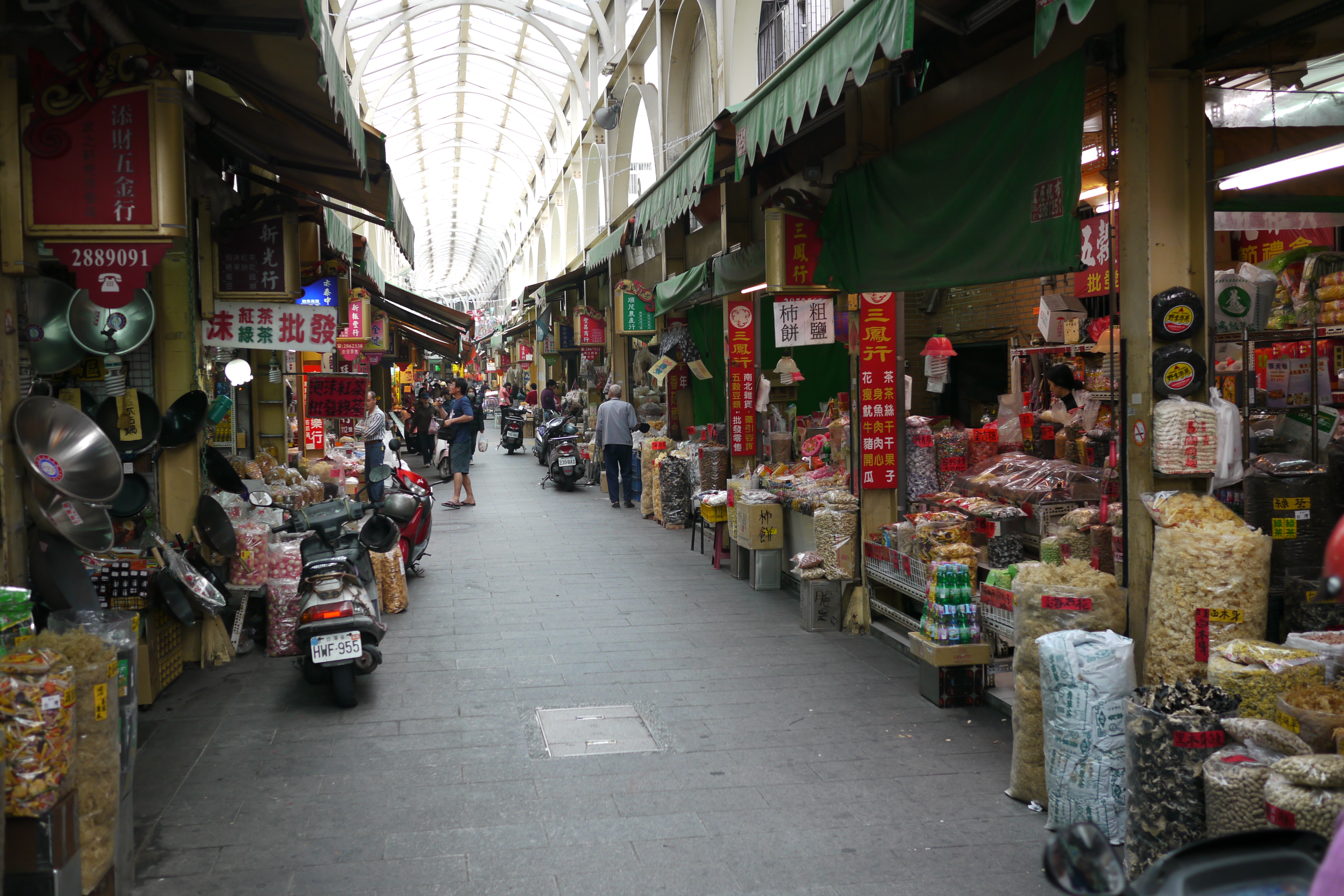

- Location within Kaohsiung
- Native name: 三鳳中街 (Chinese)
- Type: street
- Length: 400 m (1,300 ft)
- Location: Sanmin, Kaohsiung, Taiwan
- Coordinates: 22°38′15.5″N 120°17′40.0″E

The Sanfong Central Street or Sanfong Jhong Street (traditional Chinese: 三鳳中街; simplified Chinese: 三凤中街; pinyin: Sānfèng Zhōng Jiē) is a street in Sanmin District, Kaohsiung, Taiwan. It is a traditional shopping area selling grocery goods and the largest grocery goods wholesale center in Kaohsiung.

== History ==
Around a century ago, there was a river by the street through which the local merchants imported exotic foreign goods. The area used to be the place to sell sundry goods and agricultural produce. As the consumption style transformed, the area has evolved into an area to supply primarily on things needed for the Chinese New Year, in the types of grains, processed farm produce and candies.

== Architecture ==
The street is 400 meters long with more than 100 shops.

== Transportation ==
The street is accessible within walking distance west of Kaohsiung Station.

== See also ==
- List of roads in Taiwan
