= Kaohsiung Hakka Cultural Museum =

Museum in Sanmin, Kaohsiung, Taiwan

- 高雄市客家文物館
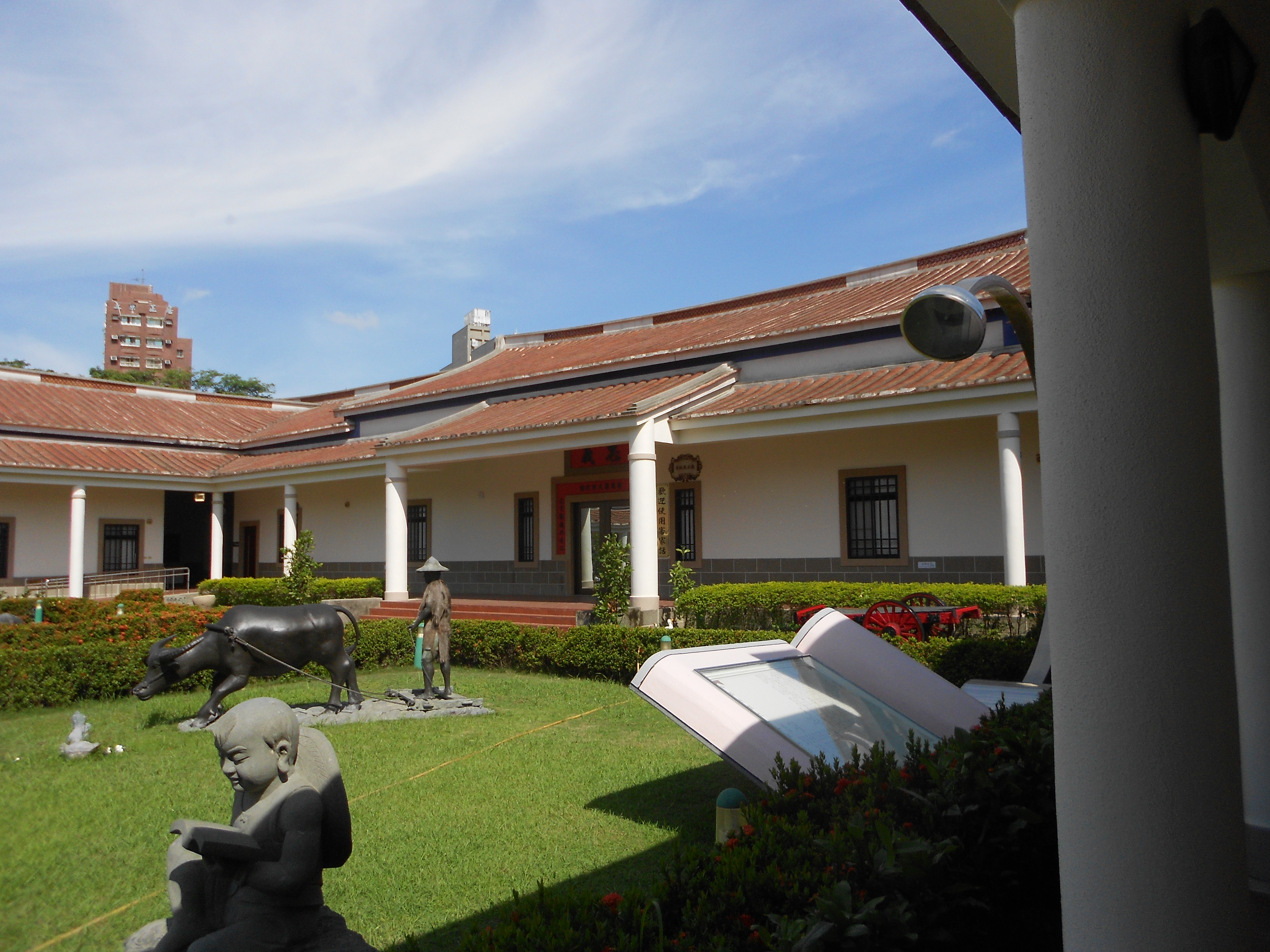
- Established: November 1998
- Location: Sanmin, Kaohsiung, Taiwan
- Coordinates: 22°39′01.2″N 120°17′44.9″E
- Type: Museum
- Website: kc.kshs.kh.edu.tw/ss/culture/hakka

The Kaohsiung Hakka Cultural Museum (traditional Chinese: 高雄市客家文物館; simplified Chinese: 高雄市客家文物馆; pinyin: Gāoxióngshì Kèjiā Wénwùguǎn) is a cultural museum in Sanmin District, Kaohsiung, Taiwan.

== History ==
In 1995, Kaohsiung Mayor Wu Den-yih proposed the construction of the museum to preserve the Hakka culture. The construction of museum building was completed in November 1998.

== Architecture ==
It is located in Sanmin Park and set in 2,645 m^{2} of land it is dedicated to the Hakka culture, displaying artifacts. The building itself is modelled on traditional Taiwanese Hakka architecture with red glass, tiled roofs and a courtyard.

== Opening time ==
The museum opens everyday except Monday from 9.00 a.m. to 5.00 p.m.

== Transportation ==
The museum is accessible within walking distance West from Houyi Station of the Kaohsiung MRT.

== See also ==
- List of museums in Taiwan
