= Neiwei railway station =

Railway station in Gushan, Kaohsiung, Taiwan

Neiwei Station 內惟車站
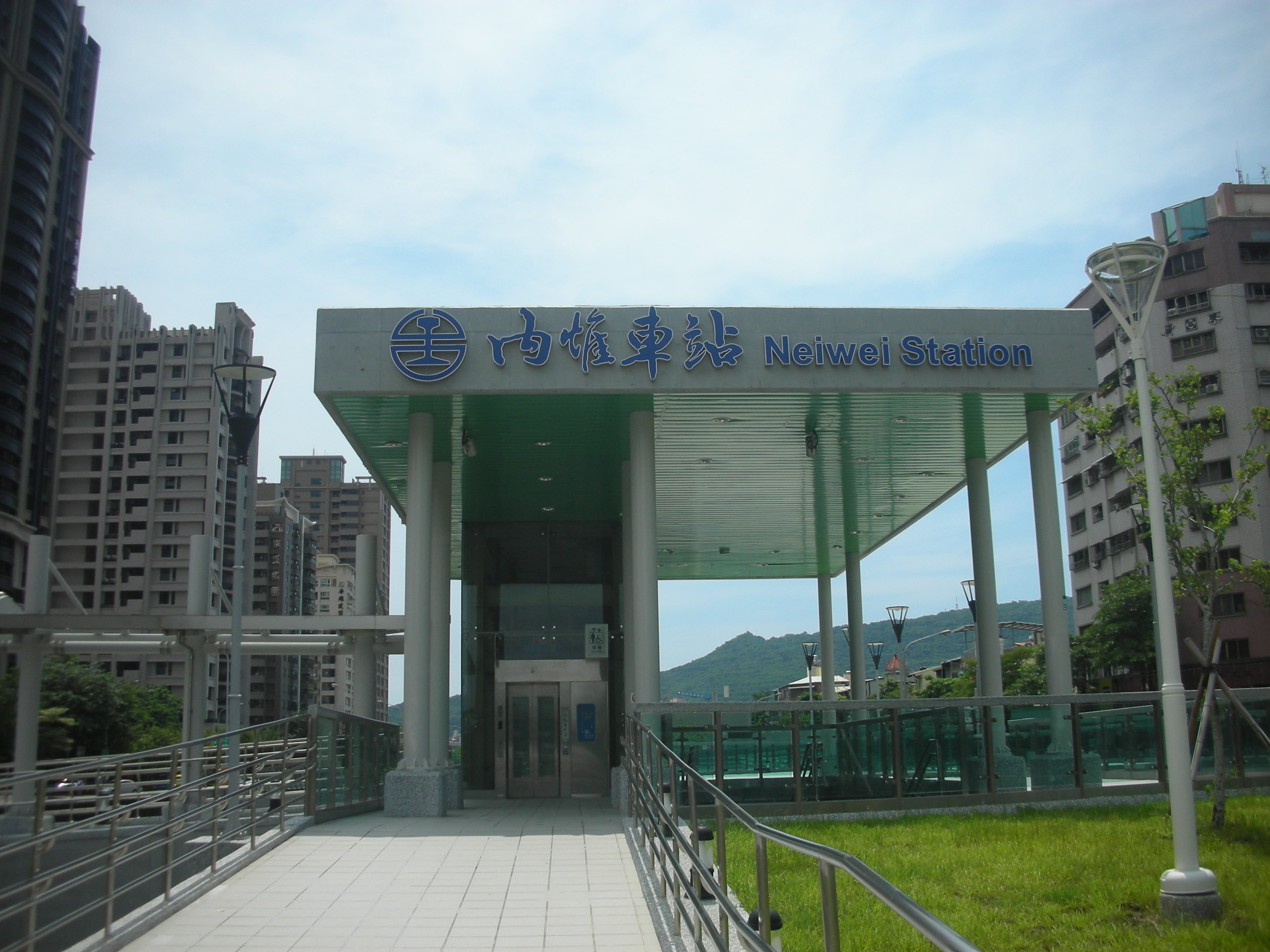
- Station entrance

Chinese name
- Traditional Chinese: 內惟車站
Transcriptions
Standard Mandarin
- Hanyu Pinyin: Nèiwéi Chēzhàn
- Bopomofo: ㄋㄟˋ ㄨㄟˊ ㄔㄜ ㄓㄢˋ

General information
- Location: Gushan, Kaohsiung; Taiwan
- Coordinates: 22°39′58.0″N 120°17′13.9″E
- System: Taiwan Railway railway station
- Line: West Coast line
- Distance: 394.4 km to Keelung
- Platforms: 2 side platforms

Construction
- Structure type: Underground

Other information
- Station code: 332

History
- Opened: 14 October 2018

Services
Preceding station	Taiwan Railway	Following station
Zuoying-Jiucheng towards Keelung	Western Trunk line	Museum of Fine Arts towards Kaohsiung
Location

Neiwei railway station (Chinese: 內惟車站; pinyin: Nèiwéi Chēzhàn) is a railway station located in Gushan District, Kaohsiung, Taiwan. It is located on the West Coast line and is operated by Taiwan Railway.It is served by all local trains.

== History ==
The line the station is on was formerly located at ground level, but has now been moved underground. It opened on 14 October 2018 along with the completed underground railway project in the Kaohsiung area.

== Facilities ==
The station is located underground and has a ramp from street level, stairs, and a lift. The walls around the entrance have been decorated with mosaic murals.
