= Sankuaicuo railway station =

Railway station in Sanmin, Kaohsiung, Taiwan

Sankuaicuo 三塊厝
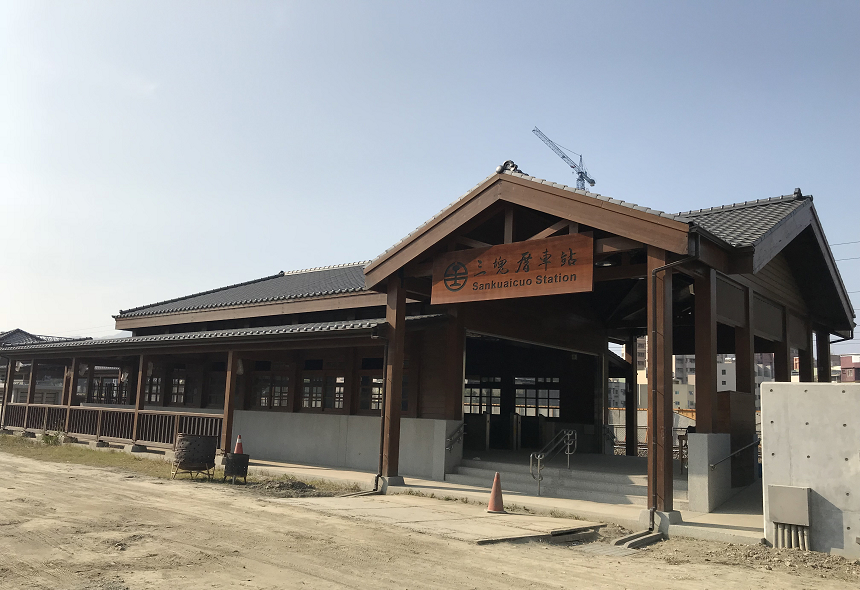

Chinese name
- Traditional Chinese: 三塊厝
Transcriptions
Standard Mandarin
- Hanyu Pinyin: Sānkùaicùo
- Bopomofo: ㄙㄢ ㄎㄨㄞˋ ㄘㄨㄛˋ

General information
- Location: Sanmin, Kaohsiung; Taiwan
- Coordinates: 22°38′20.4″N 120°17′37.7″E
- System: Taiwan Railway railway station
- Line: Western Trunk line
- Distance: 399.0 km to Keelung
- Connections: Local bus

Construction
- Structure type: Underground

History
- Opened: 1908-02-01
- Rebuilt: 2018-10-14
- Electrified: 1979-06-29

Key dates
- 1986-09-26: Closed
- 2018-10-14: Re-opened

Passengers
- 2018: TBA
- Rank: TBA

Services
Preceding station	Taiwan Railway	Following station
Gushan towards Keelung	Western Trunk line	Kaohsiung Terminus
Location
- Location within Taiwan

Sankuaicuo (Chinese: 三塊厝; pinyin: Sānkuàicuò) is a railway station in Sanmin District, Kaohsiung, Taiwan.

== History ==
The southern Taiwan railway project began near the beginning of Japanese rule in 1908. Sankuaicuo was the first station on the eastern spur of what is now the Western Trunk line, where a temporary station (臨時停車場) opened on 1 February of the same year. It was subsequently replaced by a then-permanent station building in 1923. During that time, the railway station contributed greatly to the local industry, but became a third-class station (三等駅) with the opening of the new Kaohsiung (Takao) station in June 1941.

Sankuaicuo was closed to passengers in 1962 due to falling passenger numbers, but goods handling continued at the station until it was finally closed on 26 September 1986. The permanent way between Sankuaicuo and Kaohsiung Port was removed between July 1990 and November 1995. On 9 September 2004, the Kaohsiung City Government designated the old Sankuaicuo station building as a historical site.

A new station was built and opened on 14 October 2018 as part of the underground relocation of railway tracks in Kaohsiung.

== Architecture ==
The station building was built with bricks, cement and mortar. It is covered with washed stone.

== See also ==
- List of tourist attractions in Taiwan
- Qishan Train Station
