= Zhongdu Wetlands Park =

Wetland in Sanmin, Kaohsiung, Taiwan

- 中都濕地公園 (Chinese)
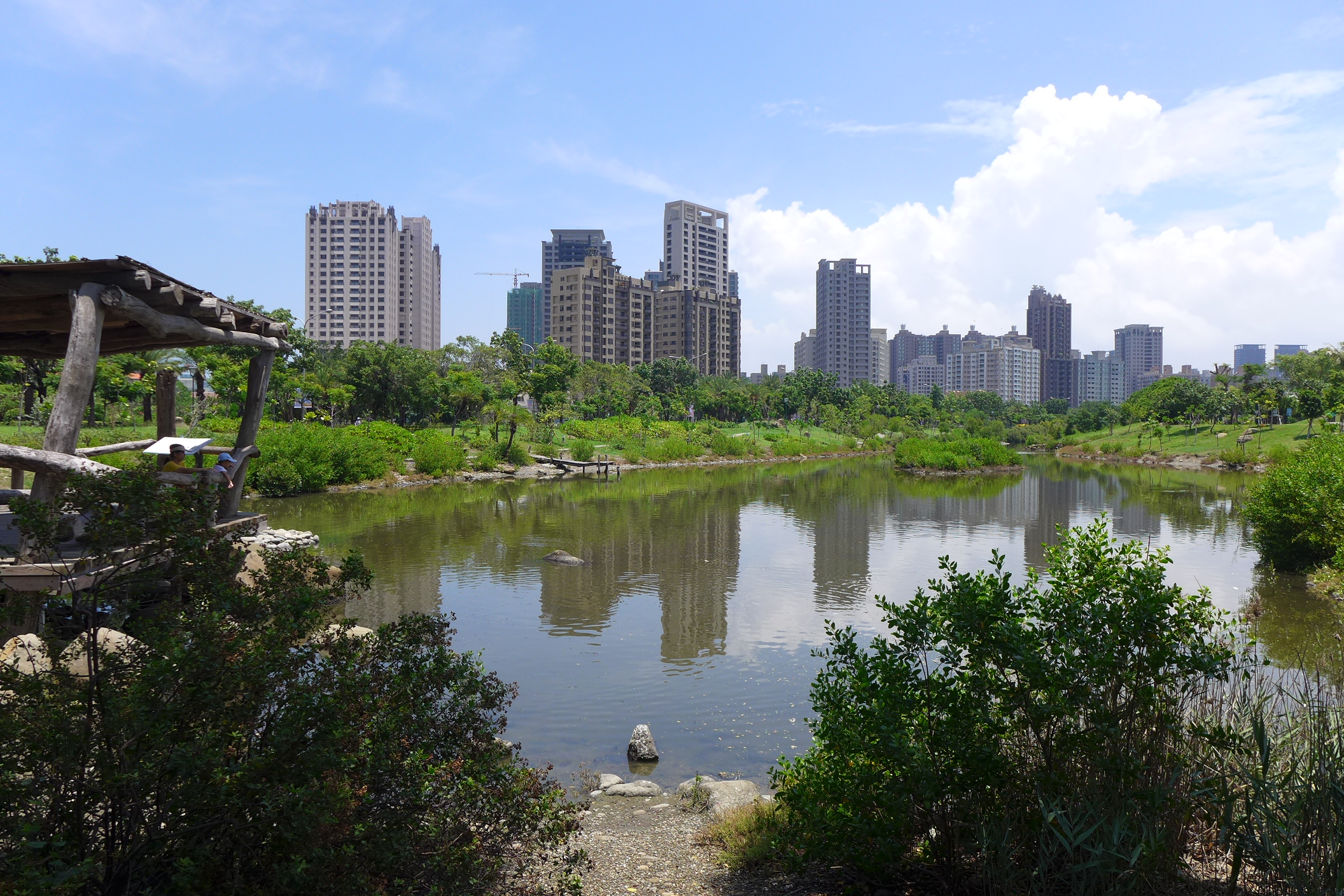

- Location within Kaohsiung
- Location: Sanmin, Kaohsiung, Taiwan
- Coordinates: 22°38′46.9″N 120°17′10.4″E
- Type: wetland
- Built: 24 April 2011
- Surface area: 12.6 hectares (31 acres)

Zhongdu Wetlands Park (traditional Chinese: 中都濕地公園; simplified Chinese: 中都湿地公园; pinyin: Zhōngdū Shīdì Gōngyuán) is a wetland in Zhongdu Region, Sanmin District, Kaohsiung, Taiwan.

== History ==
The area where the park stands today used to be part of the Zhongdu Industrial Area during the Japanese rule of Taiwan. After the handover of Taiwan from Japan to the Republic of China in 1945, the area became the center of plywood factories. After many of the factories closed down in the 1980s because of moving out from Taiwan, the area was left idle and not maintained, including all of the wood storage ditches. It became the breeding ground for dengue fever and crime. The Kaohsiung City Government then made a decision to revitalize the area by allocating NT$3 billion of budget.

The construction of the park marked the beginning of improvement in the overall value of the region in 2009. Old buildings were demolished, the advantages were relocated and a wetland was established. The aim was to change the appearance of Zhongdu region and solve the environmental problem troubling the area in the past 4 decades. The construction of the park commenced on 15 January 2010 and completed on 24 April 2011. Also constructed around the park are a 30-meter parkway and the Zhongdu Vision Bridge.

== Geology ==
The park is located along the Love River and covers an area of 12.6 hectares. It connects the waterfront green and open spaces along the river to form a network of ecological wetland corridor. Currently there are 39 species of birds, 3 species of reptiles, and 9 species of beetles.

== Architecture ==
The design of the park is based on the establishment of mangrove forest environment. The remains of the wood storage ditches were expanded into a circular waterway that is connected to the Love River. At the entrance of the park lies the Central Ecological Islet. The park also features a visitor center, activity areas and outdoor ecological classrooms.

== Transportation ==
The park is accessible within walking distance northeast of Gushan Station of Taiwan Railway.

The park is also accessible within walking distance east of Makadao Station of the Kaohsiung Metro Circular Line.

== See also ==
- List of parks in Taiwan
