= Guomao Community =

Community in Zuoying, Kaohsiung, Taiwan

Guomao Community 果貿社區
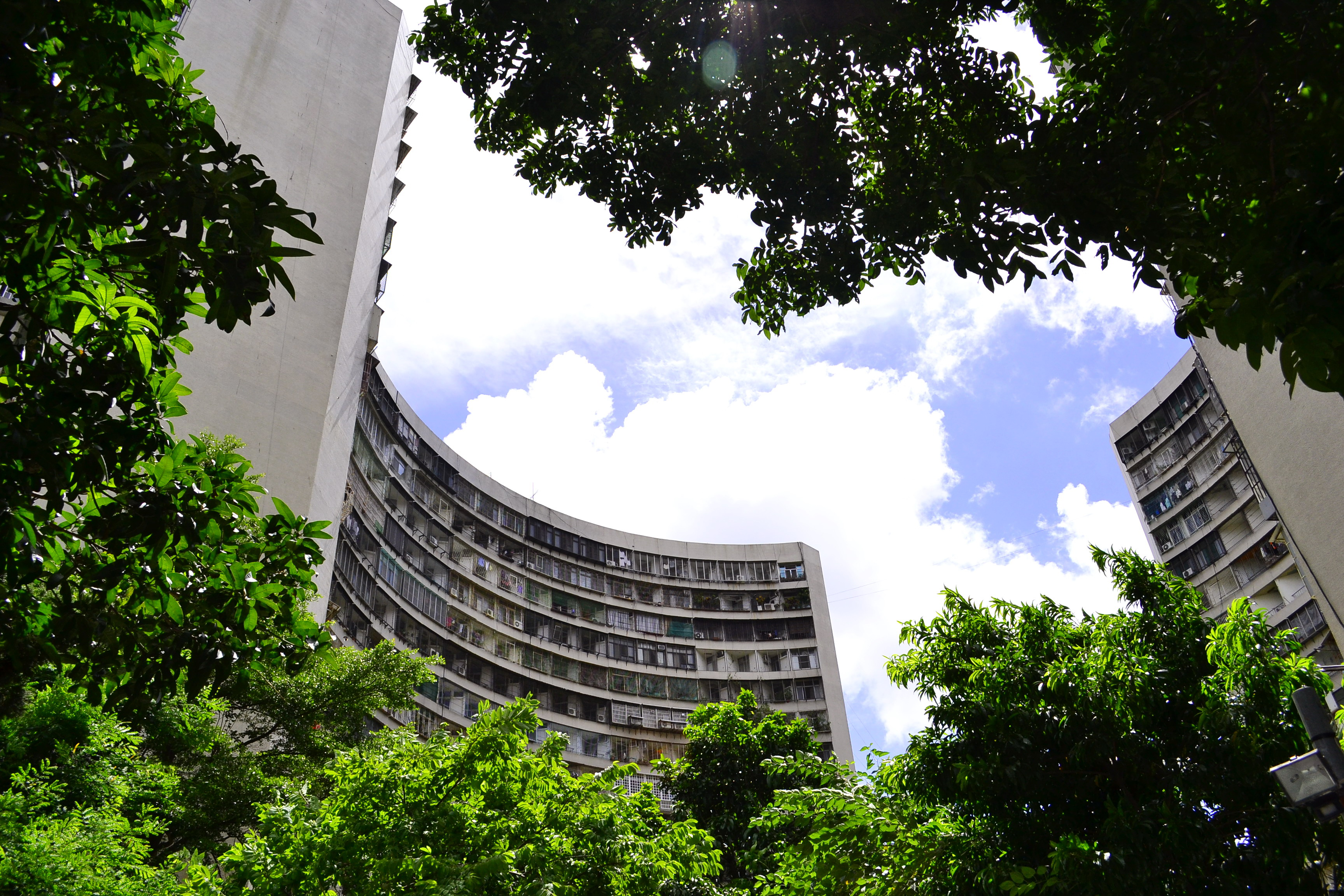

- Location within Kaohsiung
- Coordinates: 22°40′12.9″N 120°17′16.4″E
- Location: Zuoying, Kaohsiung, Taiwan

The Guomao Community (traditional Chinese: 果貿社區; simplified Chinese: 果贸社区; pinyin: Guǒmào Shèqū) is a community in Zuoying District, Kaohsiung, Taiwan.

== History ==
The Guomao Community in its present form originated from a military dependents' village which was originally built in the 1960s and which was then the largest such village in Taiwan. The residents of Guomao Community were subsequently relocated from said village into 13 high-rise residential apartments constructed between 1981 and 1985.

== Facilities ==
The area is a self-sufficient community in which various daily amenities are found, from barbershops, markets, restaurants, shops, etc.

== Transportation ==
The area is accessible within walking distance south west of Zuoying–Jiucheng Station of Taiwan Railways.

== Notable residents ==
- Chao Fong-pang
- Gua Ah-leh
