= Kaohsiung Museum of Fine Arts =

Museum in Gushan, Kaohsiung, Taiwan

- 高雄市立美術館
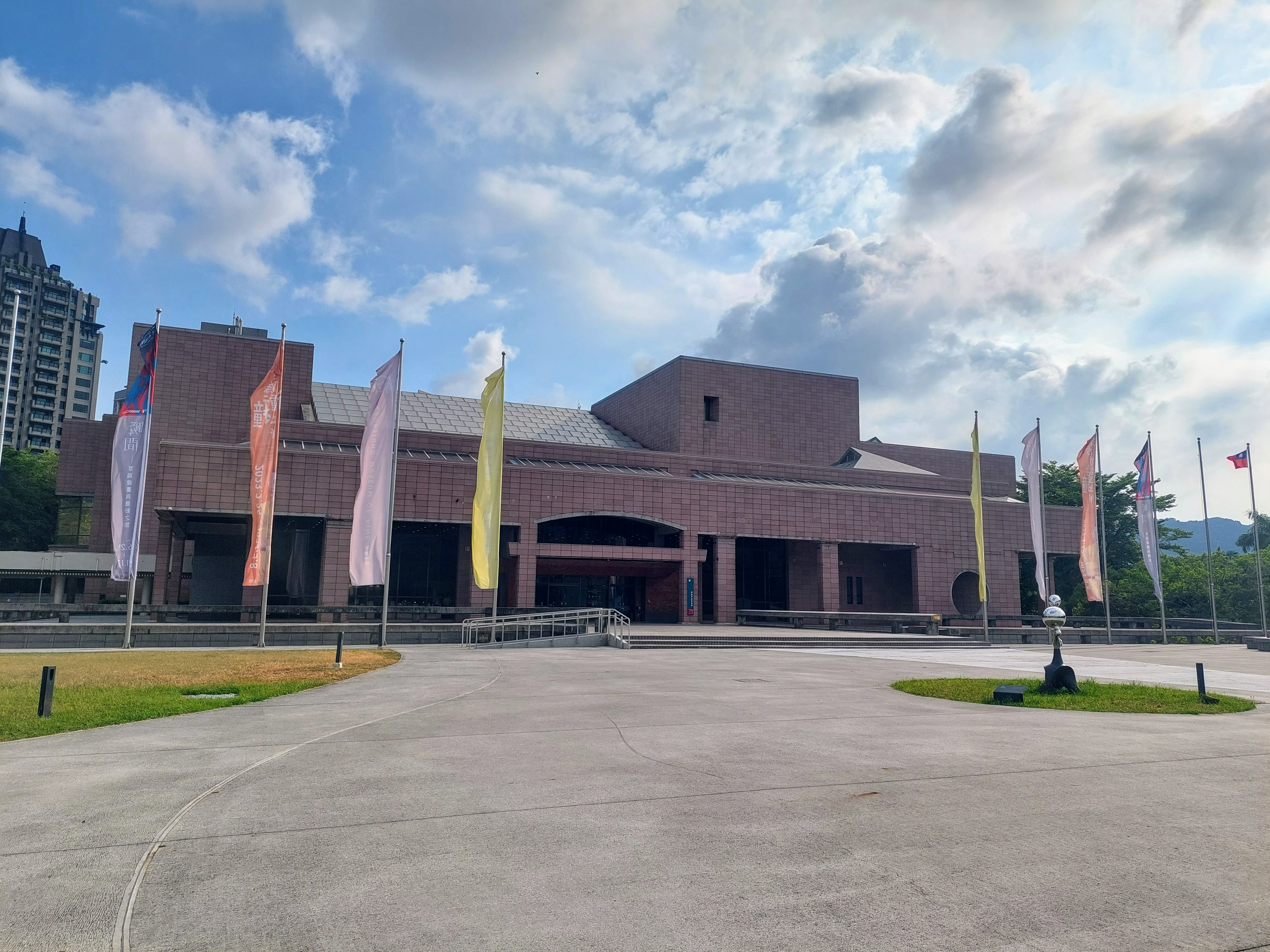
- Established: 1994
- Location: Gushan, Kaohsiung, Taiwan
- Coordinates: 22°39′23.2″N 120°17′10.6″E
- Type: Art museum
- Visitors: 1,038,539 (2015)
- Director: Lee Yu-lin
- Public transit access: Museum of Fine Arts Station
- Website: Official website

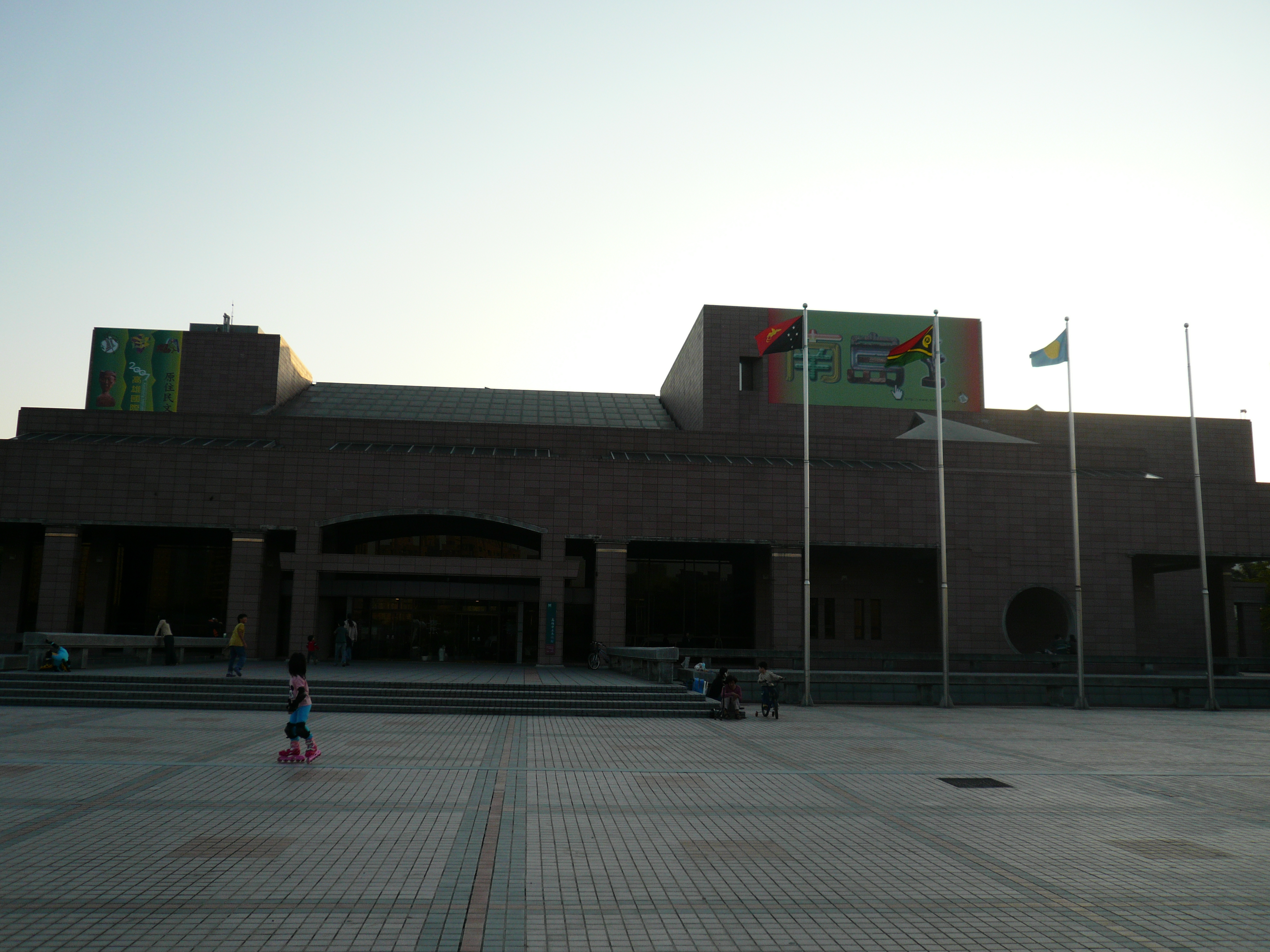
Kaohsiung Museum of Fine Arts

The Kaohsiung Museum of Fine Arts (KMFA; traditional Chinese: 高雄市立美術館; simplified Chinese: 高雄市立美术馆; pinyin: Gāoxióng Shìlì Měishùguǎn) is located in Gushan District, Kaohsiung, Taiwan. It was founded by the Kaohsiung City Government and has been administrated by the Kaohsiung Bureau of Cultural Affairs since 2003. It occupies about 8.15 acres (33,000 m^{2}) and started in 1994. It is the third public arts museum in Taiwan, after the National Taiwan Museum of Fine Arts and the Taipei Fine Arts Museum.

The museum is a part of the Neiweipi Cultural Park (內惟埤文化園區), which occupies about 40 hectares. The first stage of Neiweipi Cultural Park’s construction started in 1989 and was completed in 1994. During this phase, the Kaohsiung Museum of Fine Arts was completed. Later further developments were made to the entrance plaza, sculpture park, and ecology park.

== Collections ==
- 1st Floor
  - Lobby is an independent open space which contains a stationer, a service counter and computer information system.
  - Sculpture Hall is a core of the Museum of Fine Art and the beginning of visits for tourists. It plays an important role as a central link of many exhibition rooms. The height of the Sculpture Hall is about four floors. Sunlight comes in from a large skylight to make sculptures look more natural.
  - Galleries 101, 102, and 103 are located on the right side of the sculpture hall. They are used for general exhibitions and special international exhibitions. Galleries 104 and 105 are located on the other side of the sculpture hall, and their ceilings are two stories high. This feature provides visitors with different angles such as looking down at works. These two rooms are usually used for displaying sculptures.
- 2nd Floor
  - Galleries on the second floor are mainly for exhibiting works which are of large size.
- 3rd Floor
  - The main feature of these galleries is that they can be used for displaying precious works such as calligraphy. This type of artwork requires special climate control to keep moisture and temperature stable..
- 4th Floor
  - The galleries here are mobile because they can be divided into different sizes and spaces.

== Outdoors space of the museum ==
- Perimeter:The perimeter is the first impression that the visitors here will have. Since the Museum of Fine Arts itself has functions of both leisure and art, the designers of the perimeter decided to emphasize presenting a sculptural atmosphere. This makes people feel relaxed and connect the feeling with the art itself.
- Park Walkways and Facilities: After entering the park through the entrance, visitors can easily see signs which point out the way to the museum and leisure facilities. Public restrooms and seats are located along the walkways.
- Semi-Circular Outdoor Plaza and Covered Walkway: The covered walkway provides a direct path to the educational spaces inside the museum such as studio classrooms and auditorium. In this way, the inside and outside activities are connected.
- Sculpture Park: The sculpture park is composed of the lawn behind the administrative area and the southwestern park. It was chiefly constructed and developed during the first phrase. With various types of scenery such as lawns and groves, the sculpture park can display different types of sculptures in different settings. Though most of the sculptures are located in the sculpture park, some are arranged in the ecology park.
- Ecology park: The ecology park is composed of a marsh, a lake, a small island, a forest area, an observation platform, and footpaths. With the concept of ecological restoration, the designers of scenery have established the scenery which does not prevent creatures from inhabitation or breeding.

== Service information ==
- Open time and transportation
  - The museum is open from Tuesday to Sunday, 9:00 a.m. to 5:00 p.m., and is closed on Mondays. Visitors can take bus 205 (once per ten minutes), 73 (once per hour), and 57 (from 9:00 a.m. to 5:00 p.m., once per hour on holidays).
- Tour services
  - The museum offers recorded tours, scheduled tours, tours by appointment, tours of computers, and on the air. Recorded tours are made for some specific exhibitions. Visitors can borrow tapes, players, and earphones with ID identification. Scheduled tours are on Wednesdays and Saturdays at 2:00 p.m. and Saturdays and Sundays at 10:30 a.m. Visitors do not need to make reservations and the number is not limited. Tours-by-appointment are provided to groups and are available in English, Japanese, Mandarin, and Taiwanese. This kind of tour should be scheduled at least two weeks beforehand. Visitors can also take advantage of computers inside the museum to check information on exhibitions. The last method of tour is the program "You and the Arts" which is presented by Kaohsiung Broadcasting Station on Saturday mornings at 11:00.
- Art library
  - There are about 3,000 videotapes of arts and near 20,000 books of diverse art-related materials in this library, all of which may be used by the public for leisure or research. The library is open from 9:30 am to 4:50 pm except for Mondays and national holidays.

== Transportation ==
The museum is accessible via the Museum of Fine Arts railway station of Taiwan Railway.

== See also ==
- List of museums in Taiwan
- Taipei Fine Arts Museum
