= Kaohsiung Municipal Sanmin Senior High School =

Coordinates: 22.6623°N 120.3271°E

Kaohsiung Municipal Sanmin Senior High School 高雄市立三民高級中學
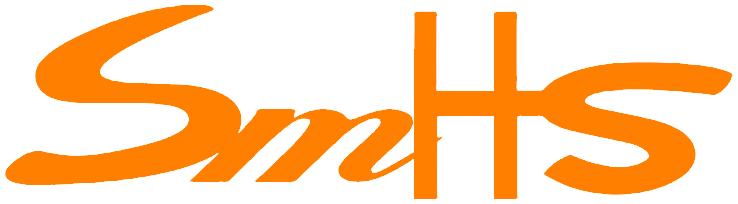

Location
- No.81, Jingding Road, Sanmin, Kaohsiung, Taiwan

Information
- Other name: Sanmin Senior High School
- Type: Municipal Senior High School
- Established: Preparatory office established September 7, 1994; Formally established in July 1996
- School district: Sanmin, Kaohsiung, Taiwan
- School number: 886-7-347-5181
- Principal: 劉人誠
- Staff: 106 persons
- Grades: Three grades (10-12)
- Age: Around 16 to 18
- Enrollment: 1312 persons
- Classes: 12 classes per grade, totally 36 classes. 3 classes out of 36 classes are Physical Education specialized class.
- Athletics: baseball, tennis
- Post Code: 80652
- Website: http://www.smhs.kh.edu.tw

Kaohsiung Municipal Sanmin Senior High School, also known simply as Sanmin Senior High School, is a high school located in Sanmin District, Kaohsiung City, Taiwan.

== See also ==
- Education in Taiwan
