= Sanmin District =

District in Kaohsiung, Taiwan

Coordinates: 22.656235°N 120.326715°E

Sanmin 三民區
- District
- Sanmin District
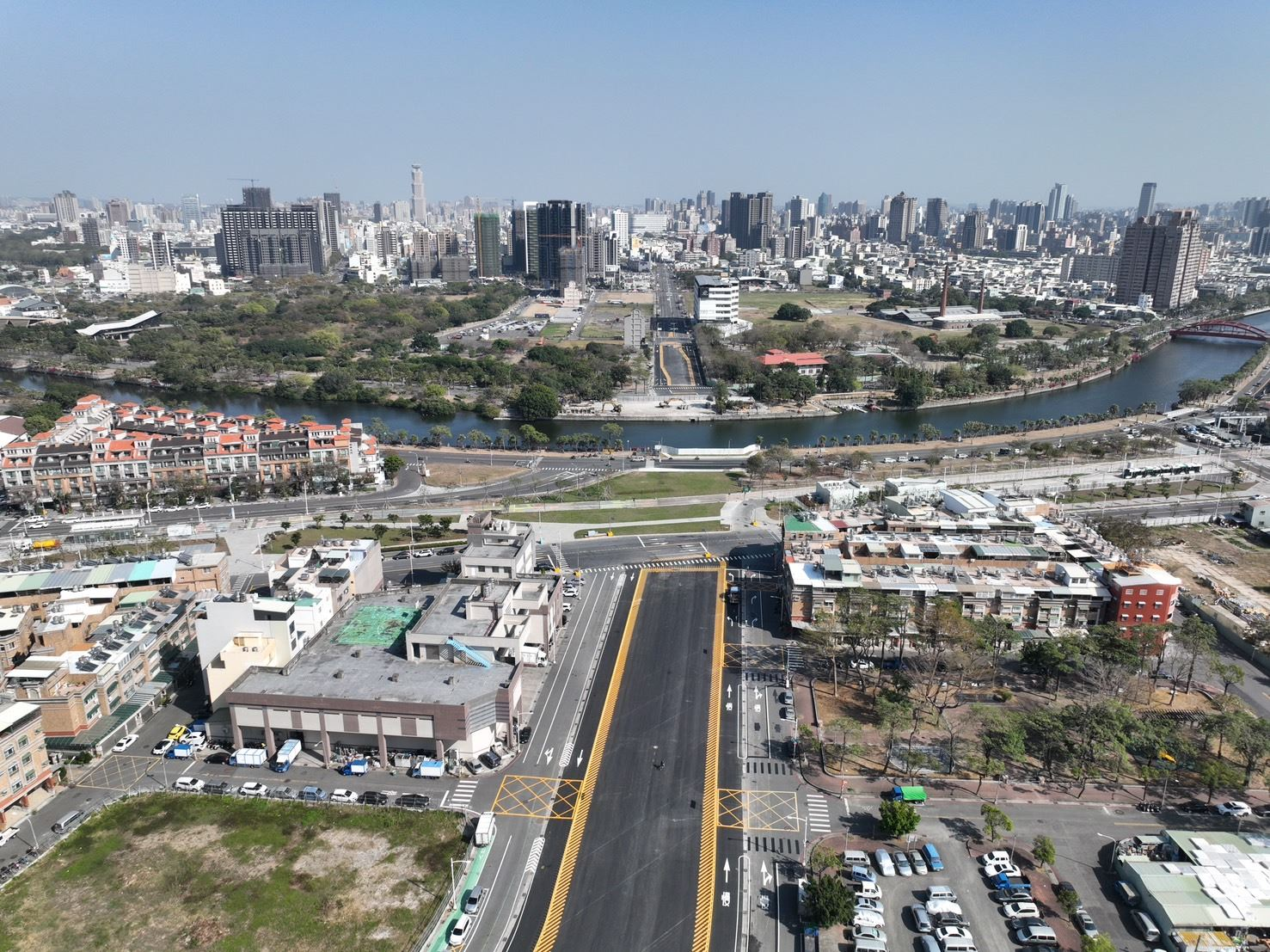

- Sanmin District in Kaohsiung City
- Country: Taiwan
- Region: Southern Taiwan

Population (October 2023)
  - Total: 331,875
- Website: smd.kcg.gov.tw/en/

Sanmin District (Chinese: 三民區; pinyin: Sānmín Qū) is a district of Kaohsiung, Taiwan.

== History ==
During the Ming dynasty, the Wang, Tsai, and Cheng families built houses in the area to farm the land. The area was thus named Sankuaicu (三塊厝; 'Three Houses'). After the handover of Taiwan from Japan to the Republic of China, the area was renamed Sanmin to reflect the desire to create a model district for implementing the Three Principles of the People.

== Geography ==
The current population of Sanmin District is 331,875 people, consisting of 158,939 males and 172,936 females.

== Administrative divisions ==
As of August 2006, Sanmin District has 87 villages; which are divided into 1,749 neighborhoods; which are further sub-divided into 125,561 households. Villages in the district are Dingjin, Dingcheng, Dingjiang, Dingli, Dingxi, Dingzhong, Dingtai, Benguan, Benhe, Benwen, Benwu, Benyuan, Benan, Benshang, Benyang, Baoshi, Baode, Baotai, Baoxing, Baozhong, Baohua, Baoguo, Baomin, Baoqing, Baoye, Baocheng, Baoan, Baolong, Baozhu, Baoyu, Wanzi, Wanai, Wanzhong, Wanhua, Wansheng, Wanli, Wanfu, Zhengxing, Zhengshun, Wanxing, Wancheng, Ankang, Anning, Anji, Anfa, Antung, Dade, Daming, Daren, Dayong, Tongde, Dezhi, Deren, Ansheng, Detung, Dehang, Jinghua, Minxiang, Anyi, Antai, Anbang, Shiquan, Shimei, Debei, Licheng, Liye, Gangtung, Gangxin, Gangxi, Boai, Bohui, Zhangming, Jiantung, Xingde, Fengnan, Fengbei, Dexi, Fengyu, Chuantung, Yumin, Lihang, Qiansui, Lide, Qianbei and Qianqiu Village.

== Education ==
=== Universities ===
- Kaohsiung Medical University
- National Kaohsiung University of Science and Technology
- Wenzao Ursuline University of Languages

=== High schools ===
- Kaohsiung Municipal Sanmin Senior High School

The Kaohsiung Japanese School was previously located in Sanmin District. The final day of class in the former Sanmin campus was on 19 July 2014 (103rd year of the Republic).

== Tourist attractions ==
- Former Tangrong Brick Kiln
- Jinshi Lake
- Kaohsiung Hakka Cultural Museum
- National Science and Technology Museum
- Old Kaohsiung Station Building
- Sanfong Central Street
- Sankuaicuo Station
- Tower of Light
- Zhongdu Wetlands Park

== Transportation ==
- Sankuaicuo Station
- Kaohsiung Main Station
- Minzu Station
- Science and Technology Museum Station
