= Kaohsiung Main Station =

Railway station in Kaohsiung, Taiwan

Kaohsiung 高雄

Chinese name
- Chinese: 高雄
Transcriptions
Standard Mandarin
- Hanyu Pinyin: Gāoxióng
- Bopomofo: ㄍㄠ ㄒㄩㄥˊ
Hakka
- Romanization: Gó-hǐung (Sixian dialect); Gò-hiung (Hailu dialect)
Southern Min
- Tâi-lô: Ko-hiông

General information
- Location: 318 Jianguo 2nd Rd; Sanmin District, Kaohsiung; Taiwan
- Coordinates: 22.6396°N 120.3021°E
- System: Taiwan Railway railway station
- Lines: Western Trunk line; Western Trunk line (Pingtung)
- Distance: 399.8 km to Keelung via Taichung
- Connections: Rapid transit; Local bus; Coach

Construction
- Structure type: Underground
- Architect: Mecanoo

Other information
- Station code: 185 (three-digit); 1238 (four-digit); A92 (statistical)
- Classification: Special class (Chinese: 特等)
- Website: www.railway.gov.tw/kaohsiung/ (in Chinese)

History
- Opened: 22 June 1941; 85 years ago
- Rebuilt: 2002, 2025
- Electrified: 29 June 1979; 47 years ago
- Former names: Takau (Chinese: 打狗); Takao (Japanese: 高雄)

Key dates
- 29 November 1900: Predecessor station opened
- June 1941: Station moved to current site
- 2002: Interim station enters service
- 14 October 2018: Services moved to underground tracks
- 4 July 2025: Completion of current station

Passengers
- 2017: 14.196 million per year ▼2.19%
- Rank: 8 out of 228

Services
Preceding station	Taiwan Railway	Following station
Sankuaicuo towards Keelung	Western Trunk line	through to Western Trunk line (Pingtung)
through to Western Trunk line	Western Trunk line (Pingtung)	Minzu towards Fangliao
Location
- Location within Taiwan

Kaohsiung Main Station R11 高雄車站
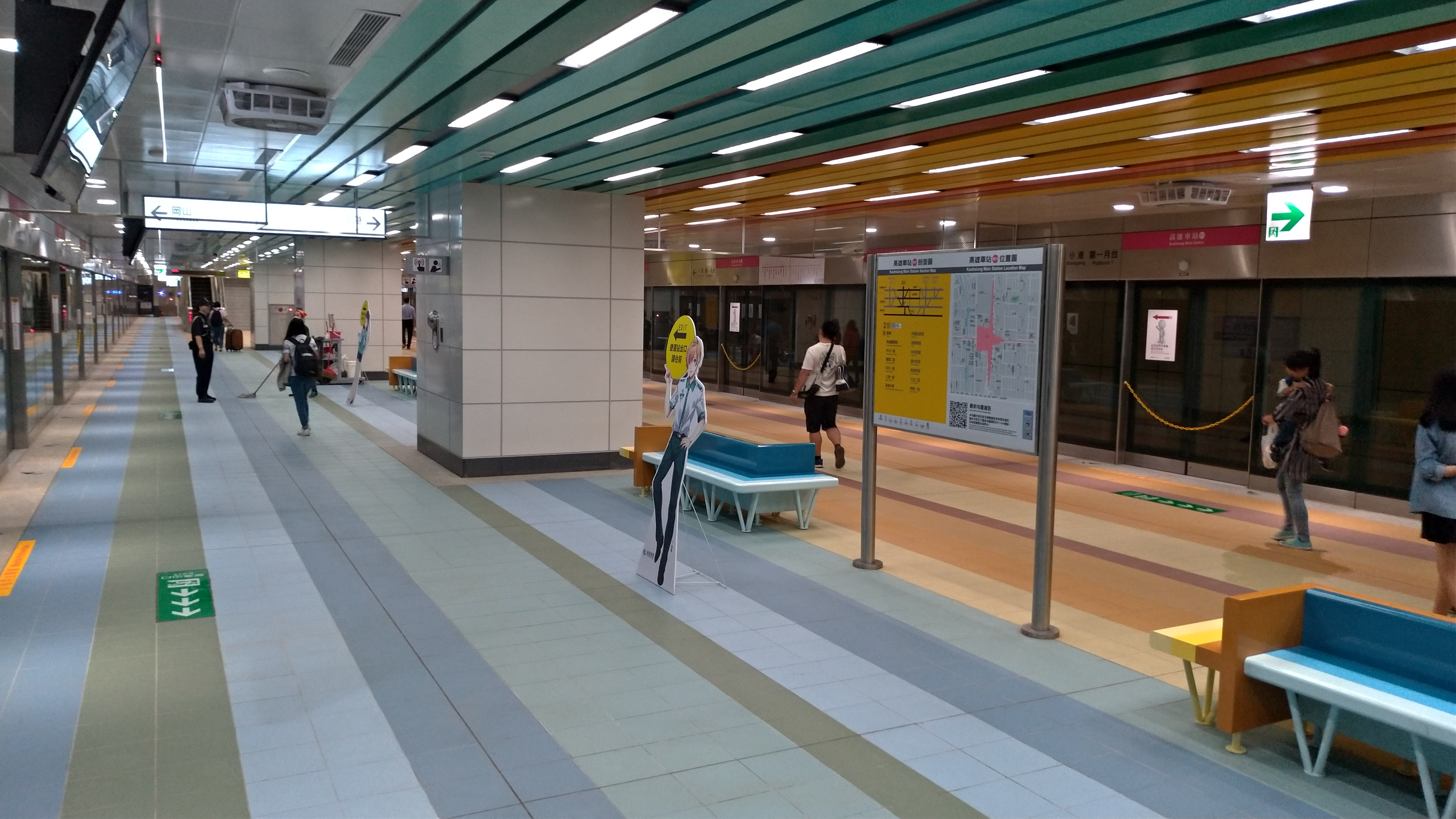
- Platform

Chinese name
- Traditional Chinese: 高雄車站
- Simplified Chinese: 高雄车站
Transcriptions
Standard Mandarin
- Hanyu Pinyin: Gāoxióng Chēzhàn
- Bopomofo: ㄍㄠ ㄒㄩㄥˊ ㄔㄜ ㄓㄢˋ

General information
- Location: B3F 320 Jianguo 2nd Rd; Sanmin District, Kaohsiung; Taiwan
- System: Kaohsiung metro station
- Line: Red line
- Platforms: 1 island platform
- Tracks: 2

Construction
- Structure type: Underground

Other information
- Station code: R11
- Website: www.krtco.com.tw/en/guide_r11.aspx

History
- Opened: 7 April 2008; 18 years ago
- Rebuilt: 5 September 2018; 8 years ago

Passengers
- 2017: 10.772 million per year
- Rank: 2 out of 37

Services
Preceding station	Kaohsiung Metro	Following station
Houyi towards Gangshan	Red line	Formosa Boulevard towards Siaogang
Location

Kaohsiung Main Station (Chinese: 高雄車站; pinyin: Gāoxióng chēzhàn) is a high-level railway and metro station in Sanmin District, Kaohsiung, Taiwan served by the Taiwan Railway and Kaohsiung Rapid Transit.

The station first opened 1941 as a ground-level station. An interim station operated between 2002 and 2018 before services were moved underground. The current station was built between 2011 and 2025.

== History ==
The main railway station serving Kaohsiung, formerly known as Takau (Chinese: 打狗) and Takao (高雄), was located at Hamasen. It opened in 1900 and served trains to Tainan. The Fengshan (then Hōzan (Japanese: 鳳山)) line opened in 1907. The station at the current site was built between 1933 and 1941.

Around the turn of the millennium, it was decided that the railway was to be moved underground within Kaohsiung. Station functions were transferred to temporary station buildings in 2002 ahead of the works. Skidmore, Owings & Merrill was invited to design the new station; their proposal featured a canopy with three spans totalling 432 metres (1,417 ft) in length and reaching 42 metres (138 ft) above ground, as well as attached buildings of up to 90 floors. The proposal failed to gain consensus due to the Taiwan Railway Administration and the city each balking at the maintenance costs for the canopy. The Ministry of Transportation and Communications then commissioned a significantly more modest design from Pacific Engineers & Constructors who had been working on detailed design for the earlier proposal. This stripped-down plan in turn received objections from citizen groups. In response, Pacific Engineers & Constructors invited Mecanoo who produced the final design starring a sprawling canopy surmounted by vegetated landscaping and paths for pedestrians and cyclists. The southern half of the new underground station including the platforms entered service on 14 October 2018. The northern half and the rooftop spaces followed on 28 December 2024.

A temporary metro station was also used between 2008 and 2018.

The rebuilt station was designed to accommodate the proposed extension of Taiwan High Speed Rail. However, on 27 September 2019, the Pingtung extension was confirmed to bypass central Kaohsiung. In December 2024 the plan was changed again so the extension will serve Kaohsiung main station.

== TRA railway ==
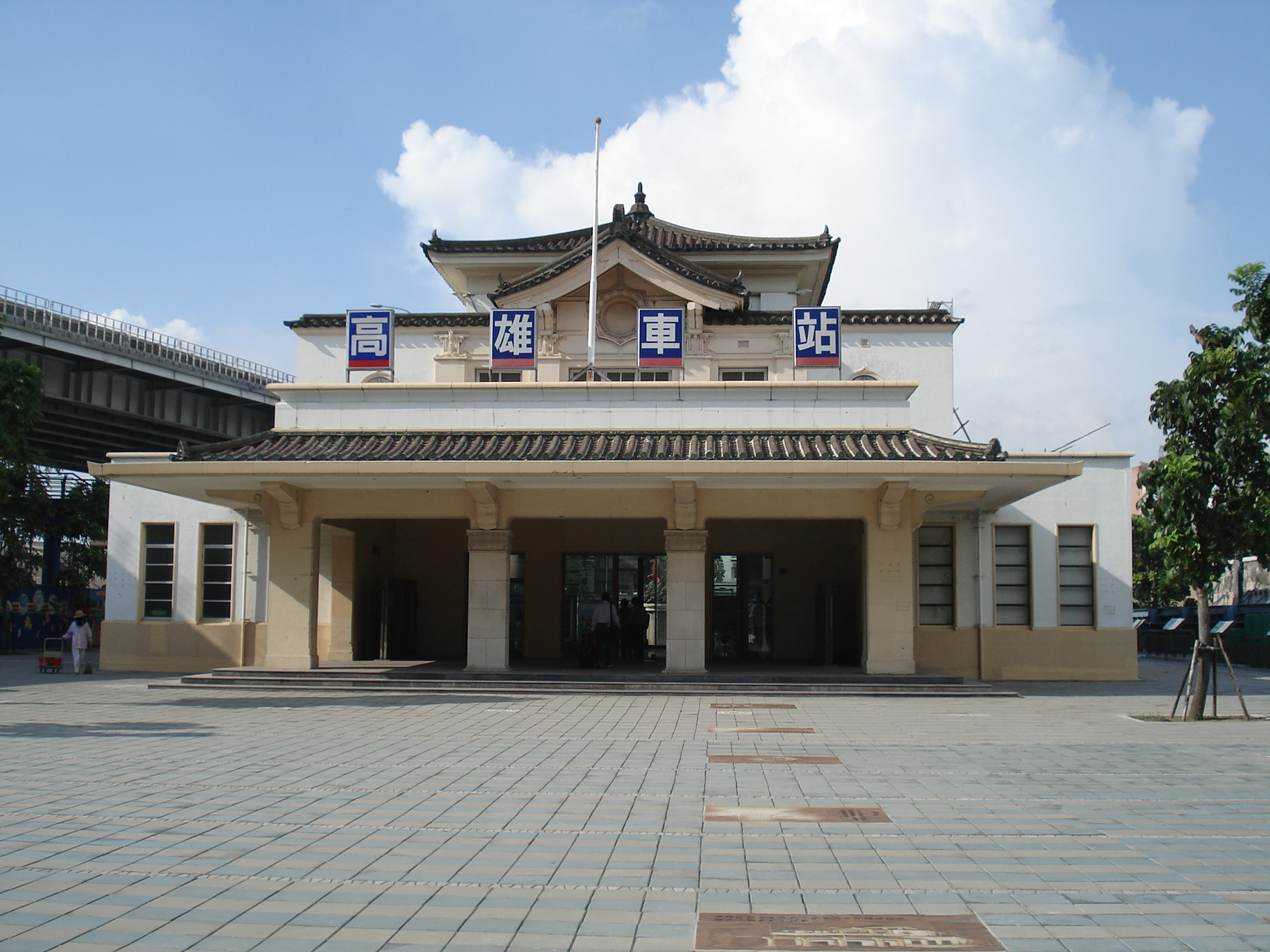
1941 station building

The TRA portion is a three-level underground railway station with two island platforms. The 1941 station building is planned to be moved back to the original position for display.

The TRA railway in Kaohsiung also serves as a commuter rail. Nevertheless, the railway in Kaohsiung only has the capacity of double-track, making it difficult to allow many such shuttle trains as EMU800 for domestic transportation to run through at once.

== Metro ==
The rapid transit station is a two-level, underground station with one entrance. It is located at Jianguo 2nd Road. On 5 September 2018, it was relocated 100 metres north, making it the first metro station in Taiwan to be relocated. The new platforms are lengthened to allow for six carriages up from three. The former concourse and platforms are closed and reserved for emergency use.

=== KMRT Station ===
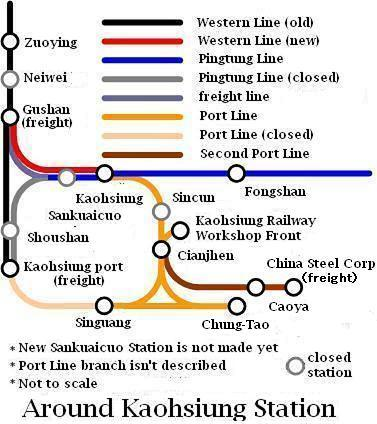
Old railway map of Kaohsiung

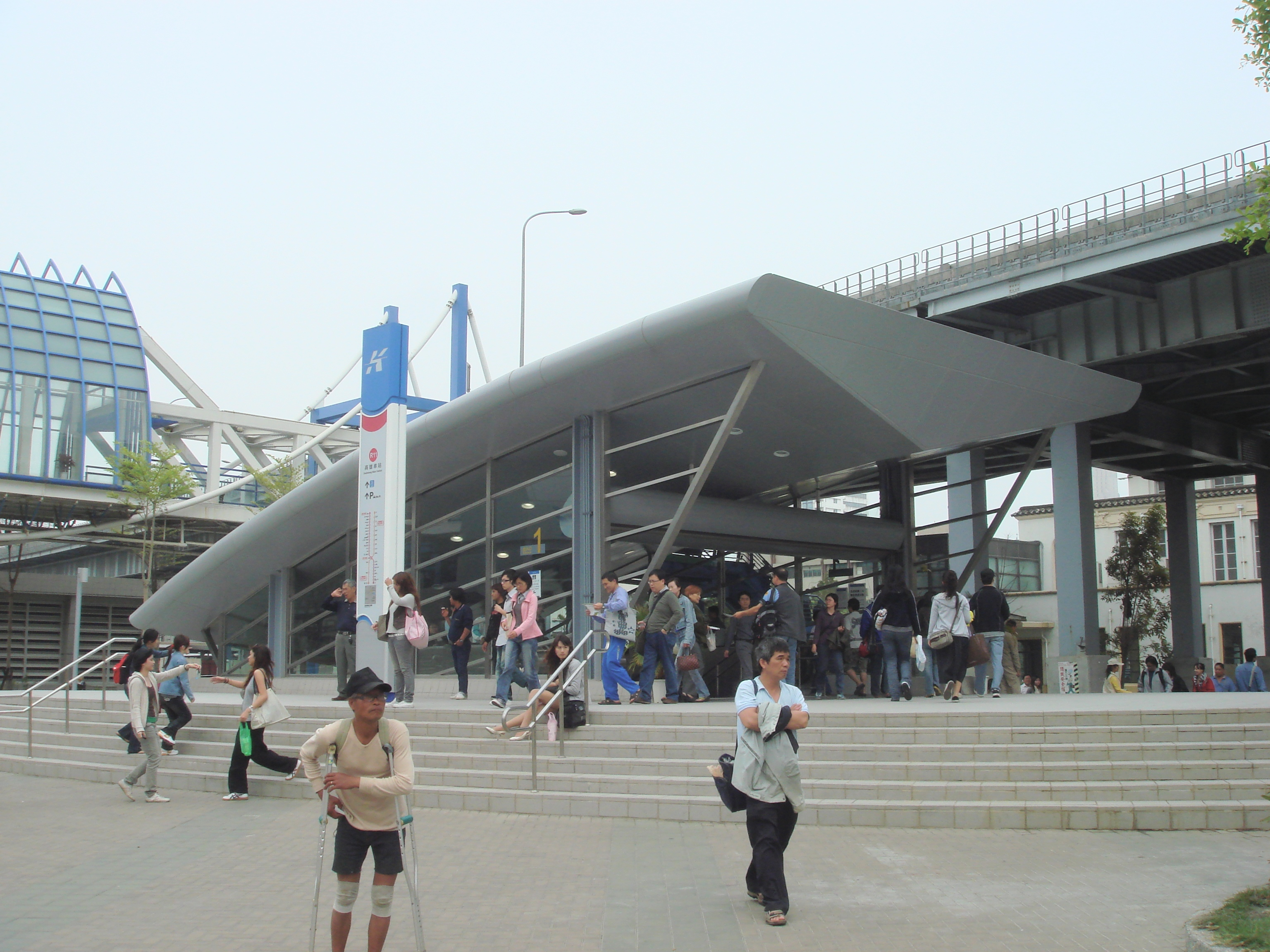
Former metro entrance

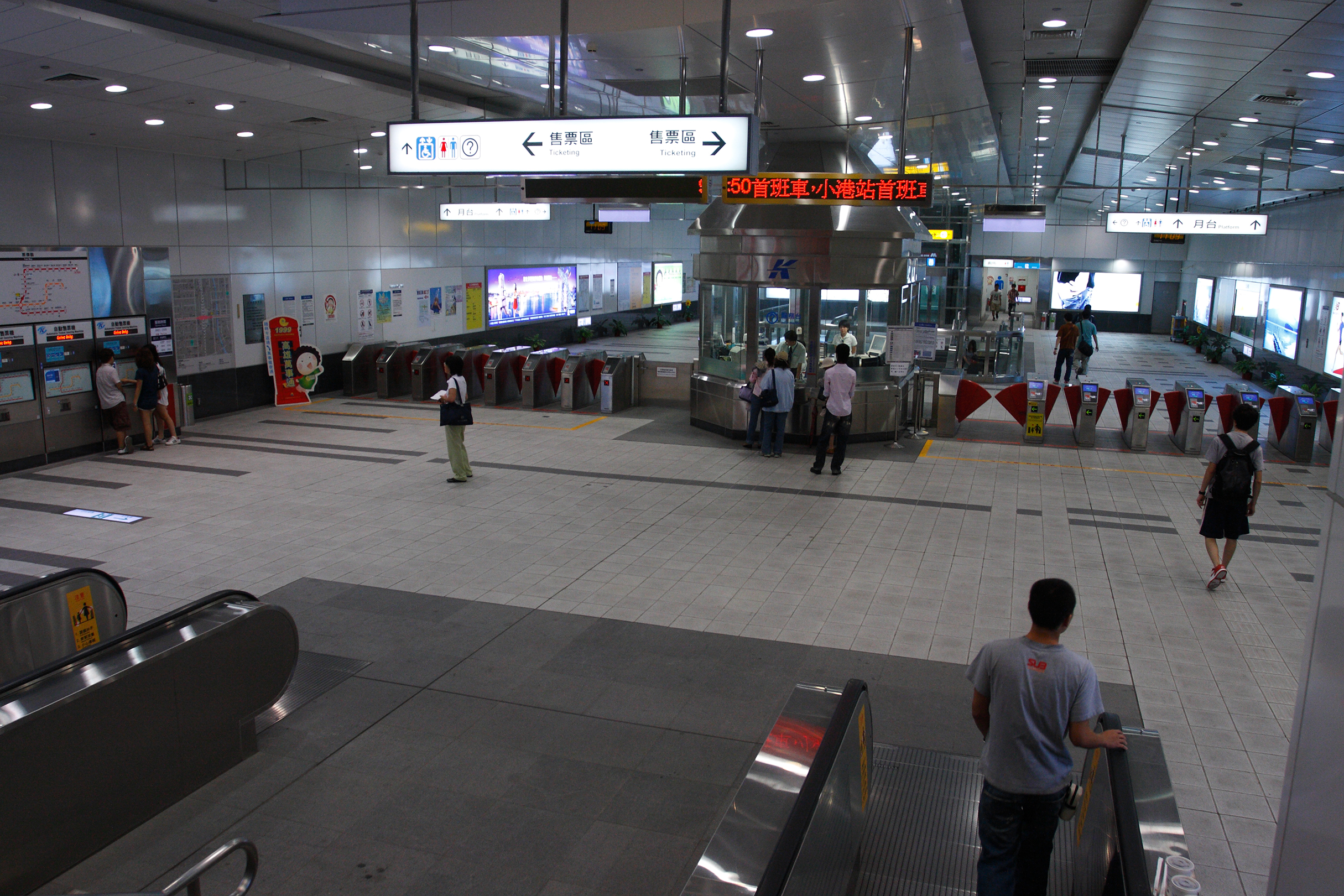
Former concourse

- 2008-03-09: Red line between Ciaotou and Siaogang opened.

Taiwan Railway Administration (TRA)
Western line
Pingtung line
Kaohsiung Mass Rapid Transit
Red line

== High-speed rail ==
There was originally a plan for the HSR tracks to be constructed underground from Zuoying HSR station to this station together with the planning of the TRA tracks being moved underground. However, due to the fact that the construction of the HSR extension would be at a relatively high cost, it was decided to only begin moving the TRA in Kaohsiung underground, and the HSR would terminate at Zuoying. Even though no space was reserved for the HSR during construction of the TRA underground project, space has still been reserved at Kaohsiung Main Station to set up HSR platforms.

== Health concerns ==
A team from NSYSU examined air quality in Kaohsiung main station on early October 2019 and found that the PM2.5 was 17 times higher than that of standard, putting passengers and workers at risk of getting lung disease. Trains equipped with diesel engine that run through South-Link Line, which was unelectrified at the time, were to blame. The line has since been electrified.

== Around the station ==
- Chang-Gu World Trade Center
- Kaohsiung Municipal Kaohsiung Senior High School
- Kaohsiung Vision Museum
- Sankuaicuo Station
- Sanfong Central Street
- Sanfeng Temple
- Jianguo Rd. Computer Market
- Changming Rd. Clothing, Electronics, and Spare Parts Market
- Kaohsiung Bus Station
- Kuo-Kuang Motor Transportation Co., Aloha Bus Co., United Bus Co., Ho-Hsin Bus Traffic Co. stations

== See also ==
- List of railway stations in Taiwan
