= List of night markets in Taiwan =

This is a partial list of night markets in Taiwan sorted by location.

== Northern Taiwan ==
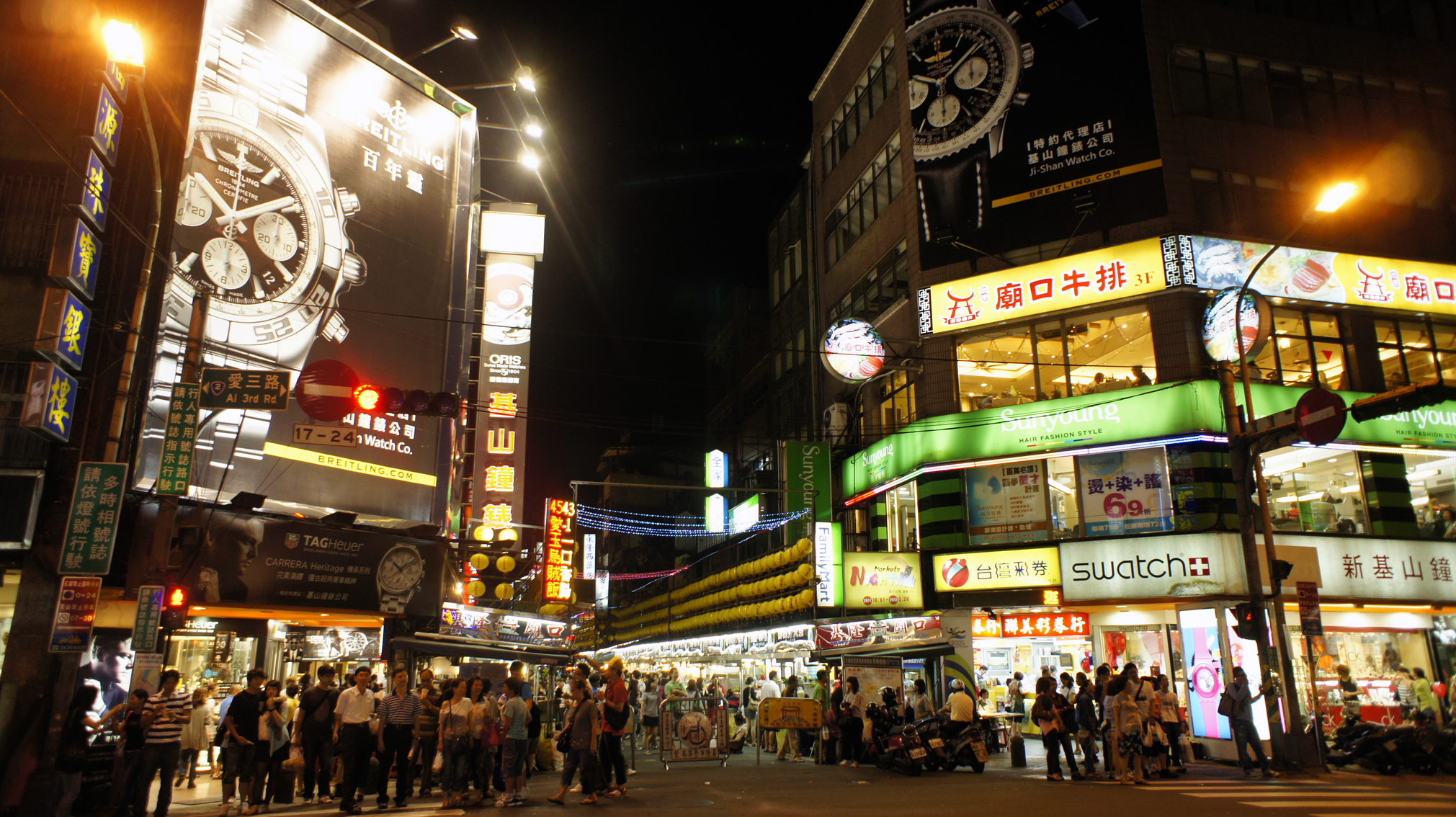
Miaokou Night Market

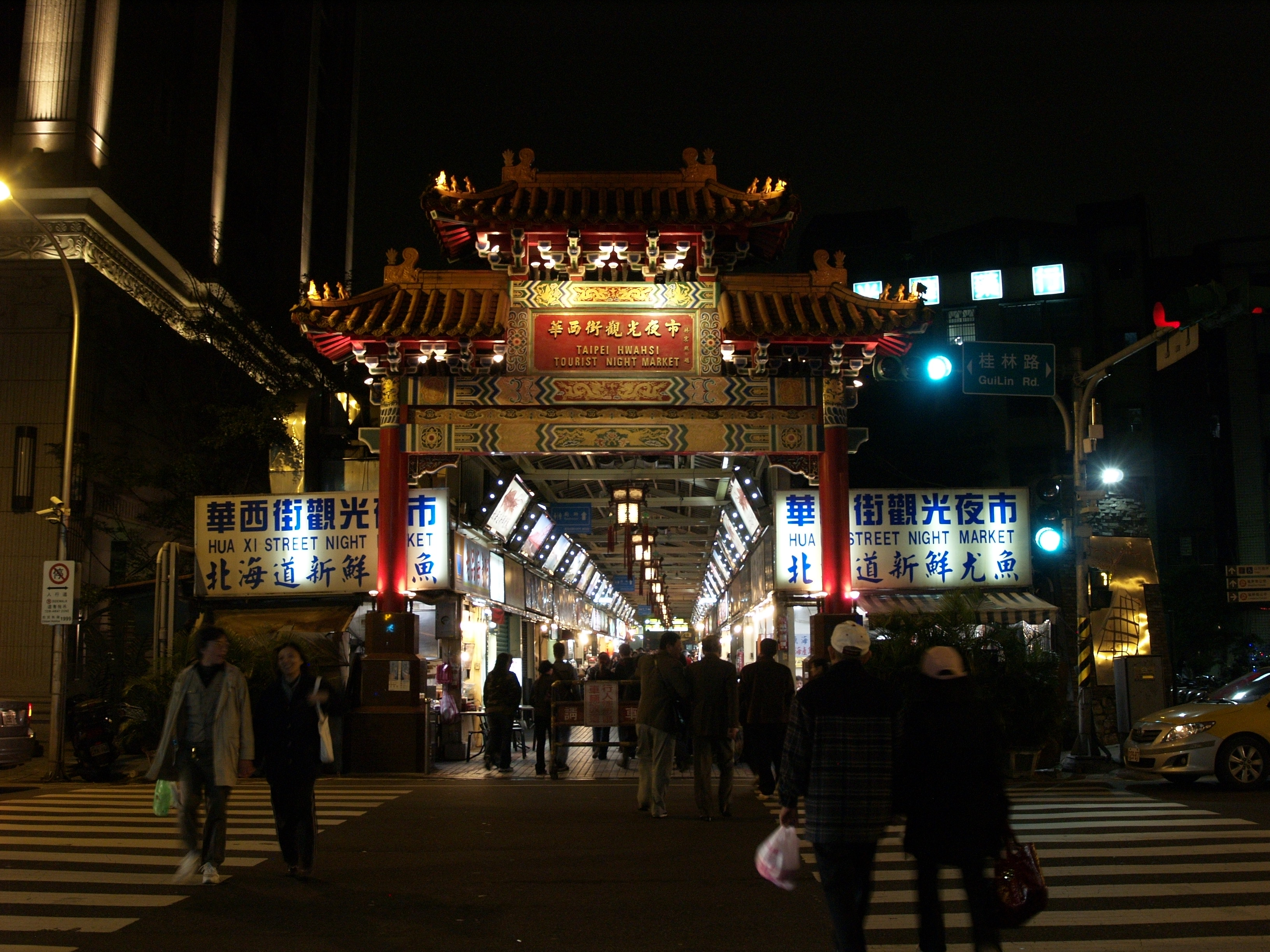
Huaxi Street Tourist Night Market

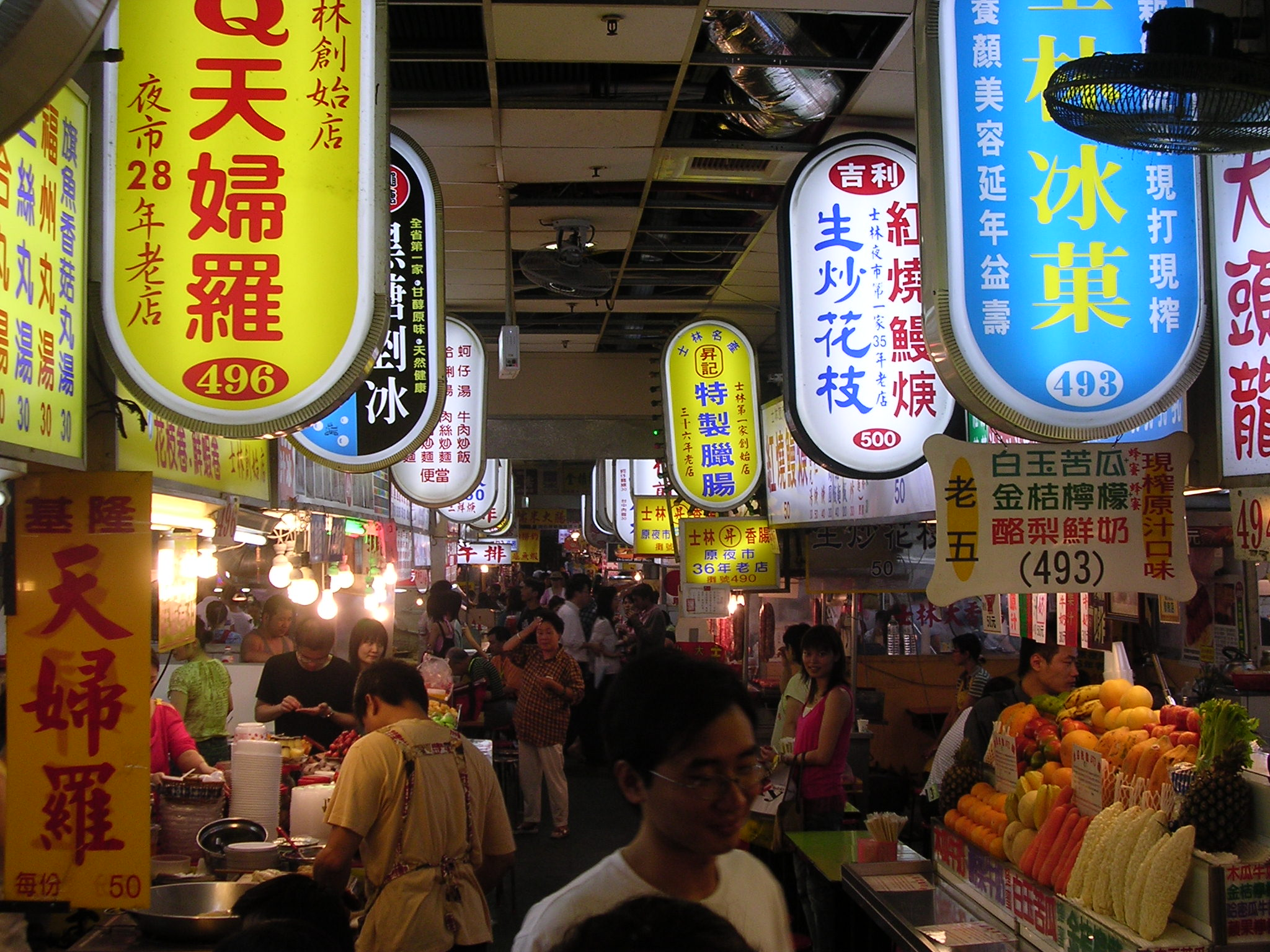
Shilin Night Market

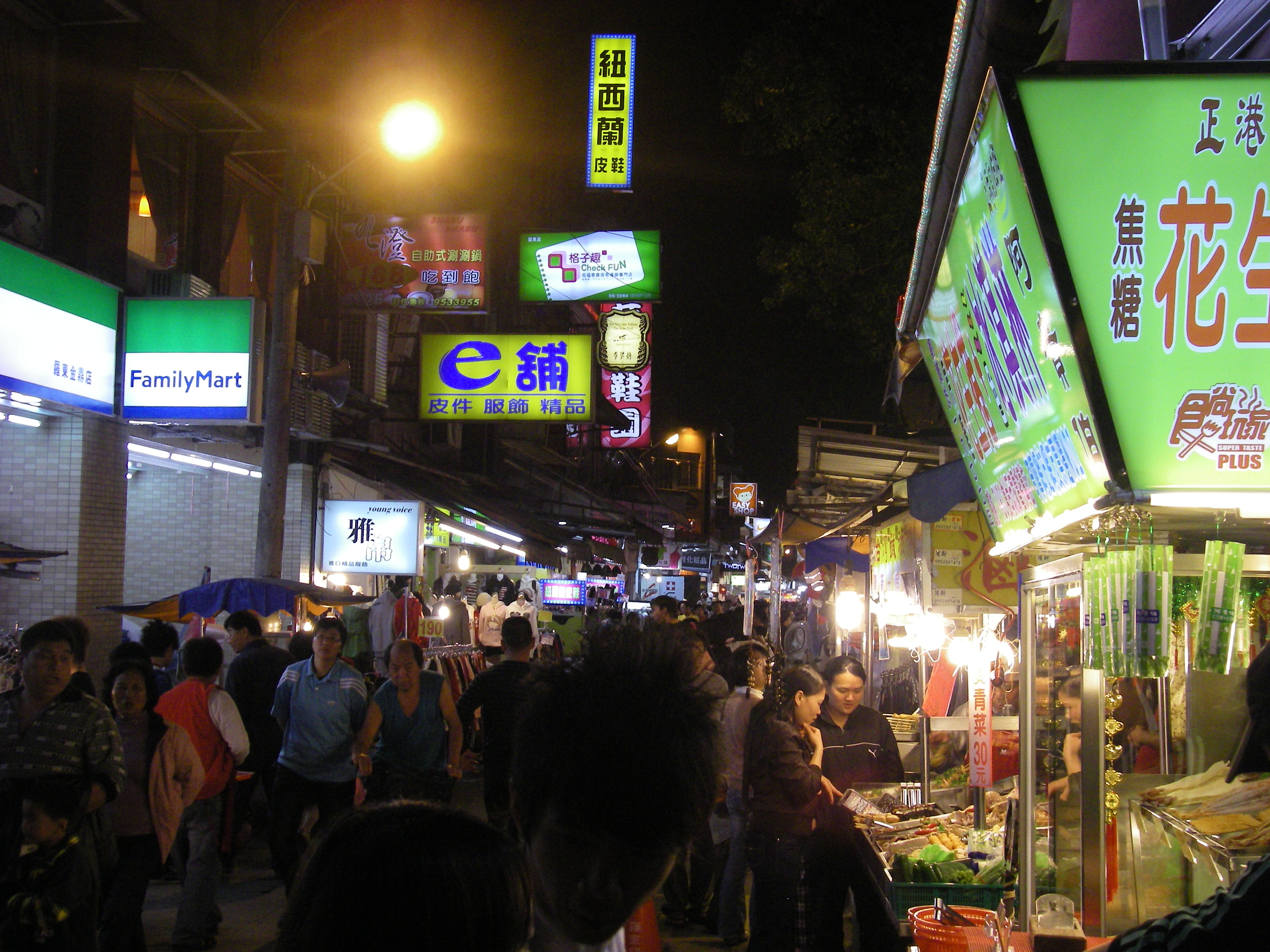
Luodong Night Market

=== Keelung ===
- Keelung Miaokou Night Market, Ren'ai (廟口夜市)

=== Taipei ===
- Dalong Night Market, Datong (大龍街夜市)
- Gongguan Night Market, Zhongzheng (公館夜市)
- Guangzhou Street Night Market, Wanhua (廣州街夜市)
- Huaxi Street Tourist Night Market, Wanhua (華西街觀光夜市)
- Jingmei Night Market, Wenshan (景美夜市)
- Liaoning Street Night Market, Zhongshan (遼寧街夜市)
- Linkou Night Market, Xinyi (林口街夜市)
- Nanjichang Night Market, Zhongzheng (南機場夜市)
- Ningxia Night Market, Datong (寧夏夜市)
- Raohe Street Night Market, Songshan (饒河街觀光夜市)
- Shida Night Market, Daan (師大路夜市)
- Shilin Night Market, Shilin (士林夜市)
- Shipai Night Market, Beitou (石牌夜市)
- Shuang Cheng Street Night Market, Zhongshan (雙成街夜市)
- Tonghua Street (Linjiang Street) Night Market, Daan (通化街夜市)
- Yansan Night Market, Datong (延三夜市)
- 737 Night Market, Neihu (737夜市)

=== New Taipei ===
- Datong Night Market, Sanchong (大同夜市)
- Fu-Da Night Market, Taishan (輔大夜市)
- Lehua Night Market, Yonghe (樂華夜市)
- Luzhou Night Market, Luzhou (蘆洲夜市)
- Nanya Night Market, Banqiao (南雅夜市)
- Sanhe Night Market, Sanchong (三和夜市)
- Sanxia Night Market, Sanxia (三峽夜市)
- Sanzhi Night Market, Sanzhi (三芝夜市)
- Tamsui Night Market, Tamsui (淡水夜市)
- Xingnan Night Market, Zhonghe (興南夜市)
- Xinzhuang Night Market, Xinzhuang (新莊夜市)
- Zhongyang Night Market, Sanchong (中央夜市)

=== Yilan County ===
- Luodong Night Market, Luodong (羅東夜市)
- Toucheng Night Market, Toucheng (頭城夜市)
- Yilan Night Market, Yilan City (宜蘭夜市)

=== Taoyuan City ===
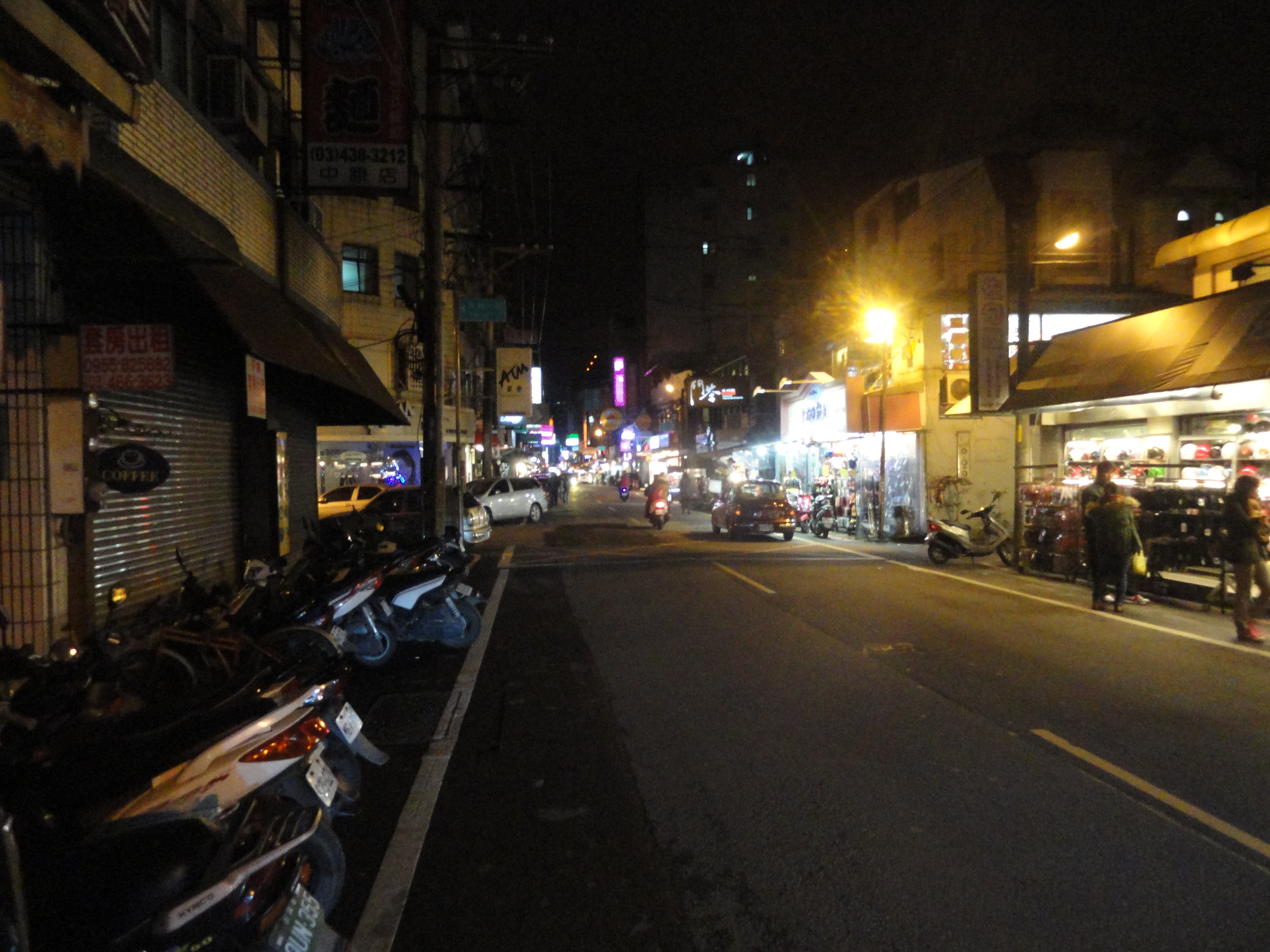
Chungyuan Night Market

- Chungyuan Night Market, Zhongli District (中原夜市)
- Taoyuan Tourism Night Market, Taoyuan District (桃園觀光夜市)
- Zhongli Sinming Night Market, Zhongli District (中壢新明夜市)

=== Hsinchu City ===
- City God Temple Night Market, North (城隍廟夜市)
- Huayuan Street Night Market, East (花園街夜市)
- Qingda Night Market, East (清大夜市)
- Zhongzhengtai Night Market, Hsinchu (中正台夜市)

== Central Taiwan ==
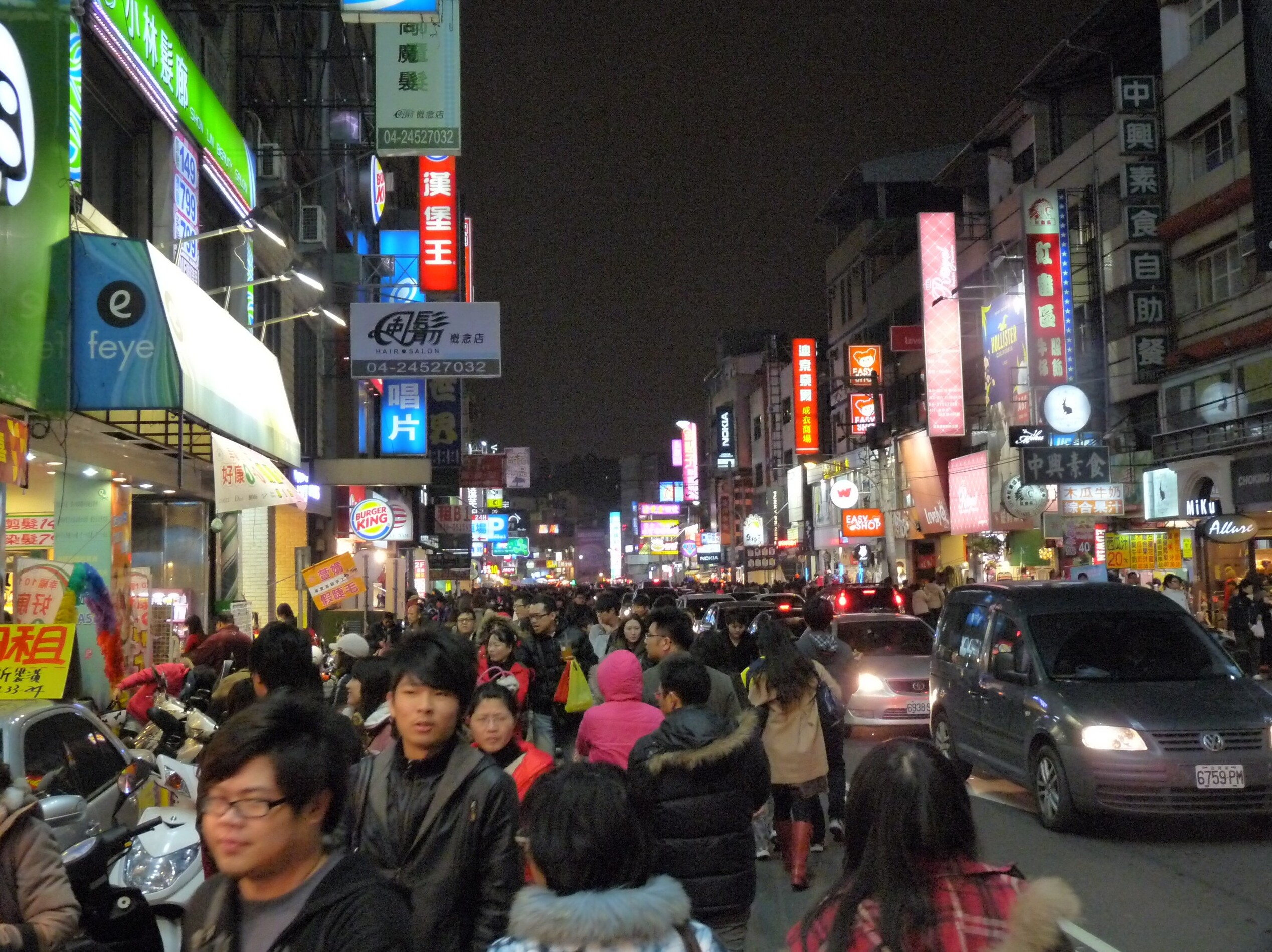
Fengjia Night Market

=== Taichung City ===
- Fengjia Night Market, Xitun (逢甲夜市)
- Fengyuan Miao Dong Night Market (豐原廟東夜市)
- Tung Hai Night Market
- Yizhong Street Night Market (一中夜市)
- Zhonghua Road Night Market

=== Changhua County ===
- Lukang Night Market (鹿港夜市)
- Jingcheng Night Market (精誠夜市)

=== Nantou County ===
- Caotun Night Market (草鞋墩人文觀光夜市)

== Southern Taiwan ==
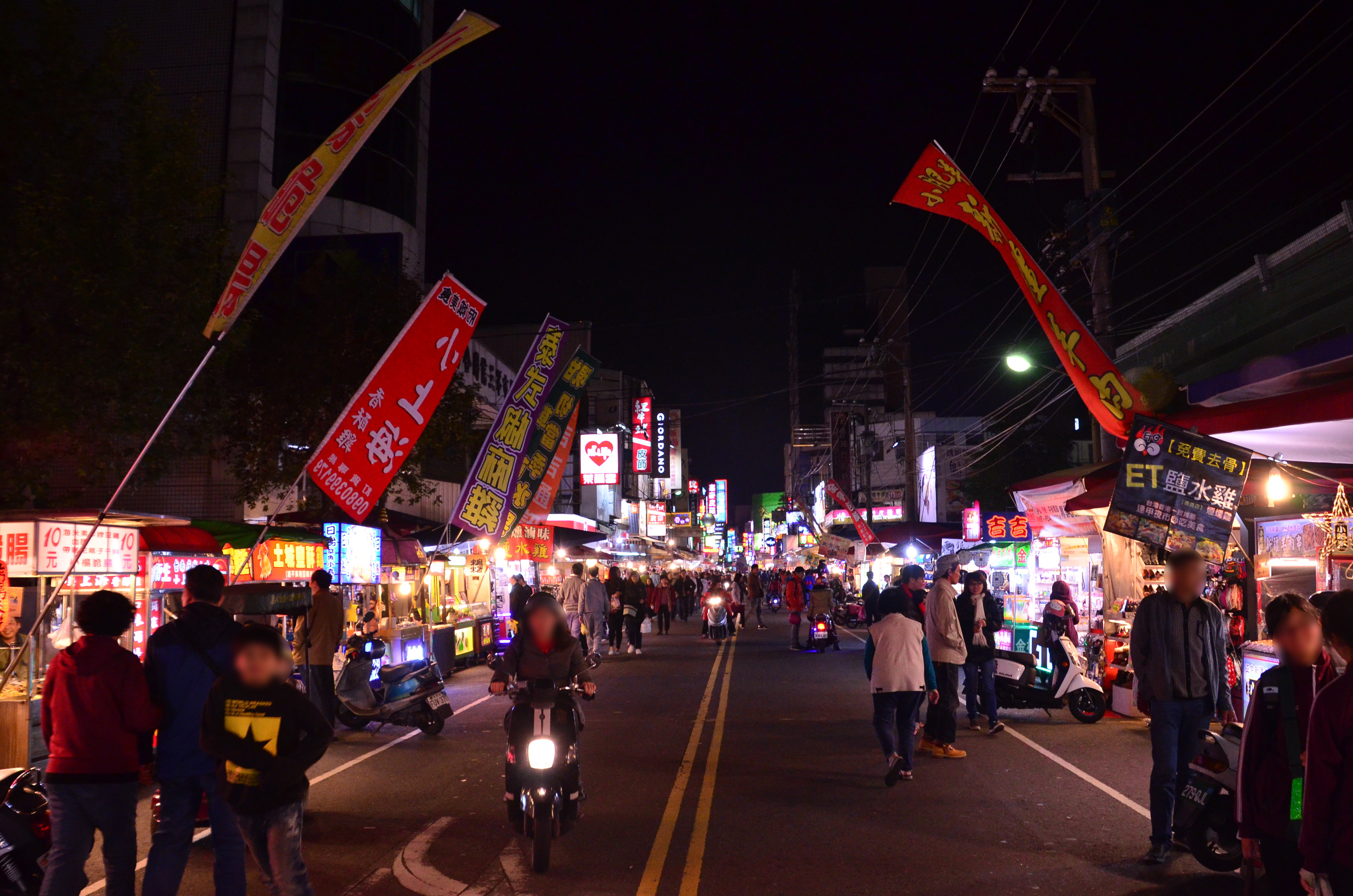
Wenhua Night Market

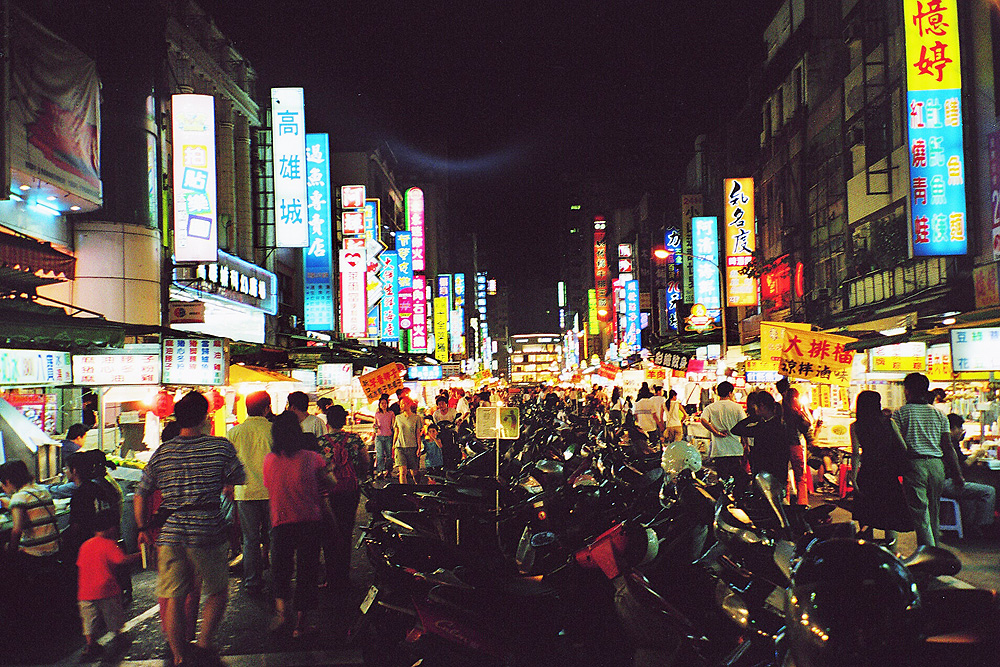
Liuhe Night Market

=== Chiayi City ===
- Chia-Le-Fu Night Market (嘉樂福夜市)
- Wunhua Road Night Market (文化路夜市)

=== Tainan City ===
- Dadong Night Market, East (大東夜市)
- Fu-Hwa Night Market, Yongkang (復華夜市)
- Tainan Flower Night Market, North (花園夜市)
- Wusheng Night Market, West Central (武聖夜市)
- Siaobei Night Market, North (小北成功夜市)

=== Kaohsiung City ===
- Hsinshing Night Market
- Kaisyuan Night Market (凱旋夜市)
  - Jin-Zuan Night Market (金鑽觀光夜市)
- Liouhe Night Market, Sinsing (六合夜市)
- Rueifong Night Market, Zuoying (瑞豐夜市)
- Jhonghua Street Night Market (中華街觀光夜市)

=== Pingtung County ===
- Minzu Night Market
- Rueiguang Night Market

== East Taiwan ==
=== Hualien County ===
- Dongdamen Night Market, Hualien City (東大門夜市)
- Nanpin Night Market, Hualien City
- Ziqiang Night Market, Hualien City

== See also ==
- List of tourist attractions in Taiwan
- List of restaurants in Taiwan
- List of Michelin-starred restaurants in Taiwan
