= Minzu Night Market =

Night market in Pingtung City, Pingtung County, Taiwan

Minzu Night Market 民族夜市
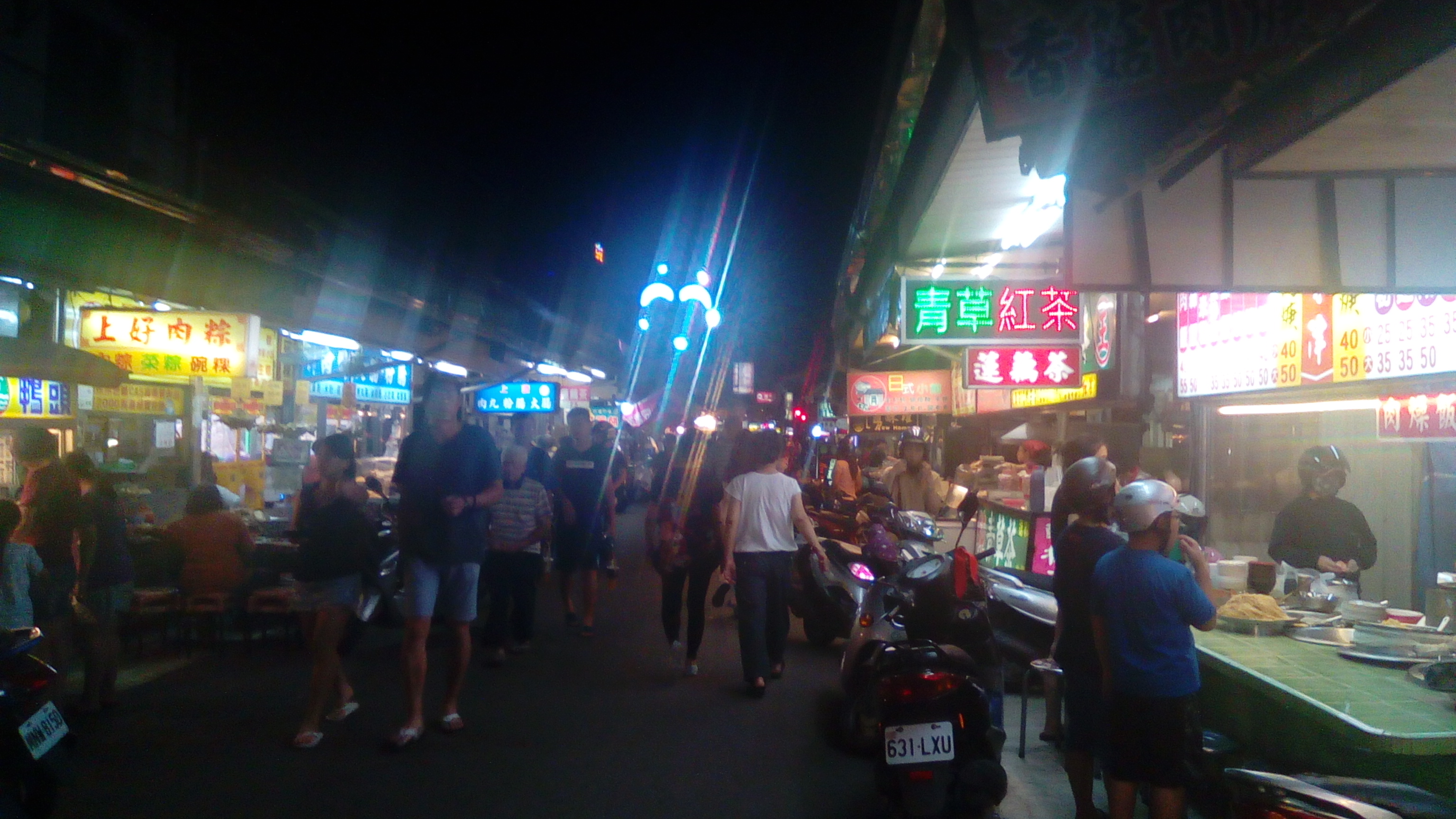
- View of Minzu Night Market in 2019
- Location: 22°40′11.6″N 120°29′23.6″E
- Opening date: circa 1800s
- Environment: Night Market
- Interactive map of Minzu Night Market 民族夜市

Minzu Night Market (Chinese: 民族夜市; pinyin: mínzú yèshì; also known as: Pingtung Tourist Night Market) is a tourist night market in Pingtung City, Pingtung County, Taiwan. Although the market is considered a "night market", many vendors also operate during the day. The market is centered around Minzu Road near its intersection with Minquan Road and stretches over 200m long with about 100 stalls.

== History ==
The Minzu Night Market is one of Pingtung’s oldest entertainment districts. According to Pingtung tourism authorities, it dates back to the Japanese colonial era (late Qing/early Meiji period, circa 1800s). During the Japanese administration, this area had been developed into a leisure market for the local population with regular circus performances, thus it became known as a popular spot for amusement. Post-World War II, the market continued to grow, eventually evolving into the city's main street food "bazaar".

== Specialties ==
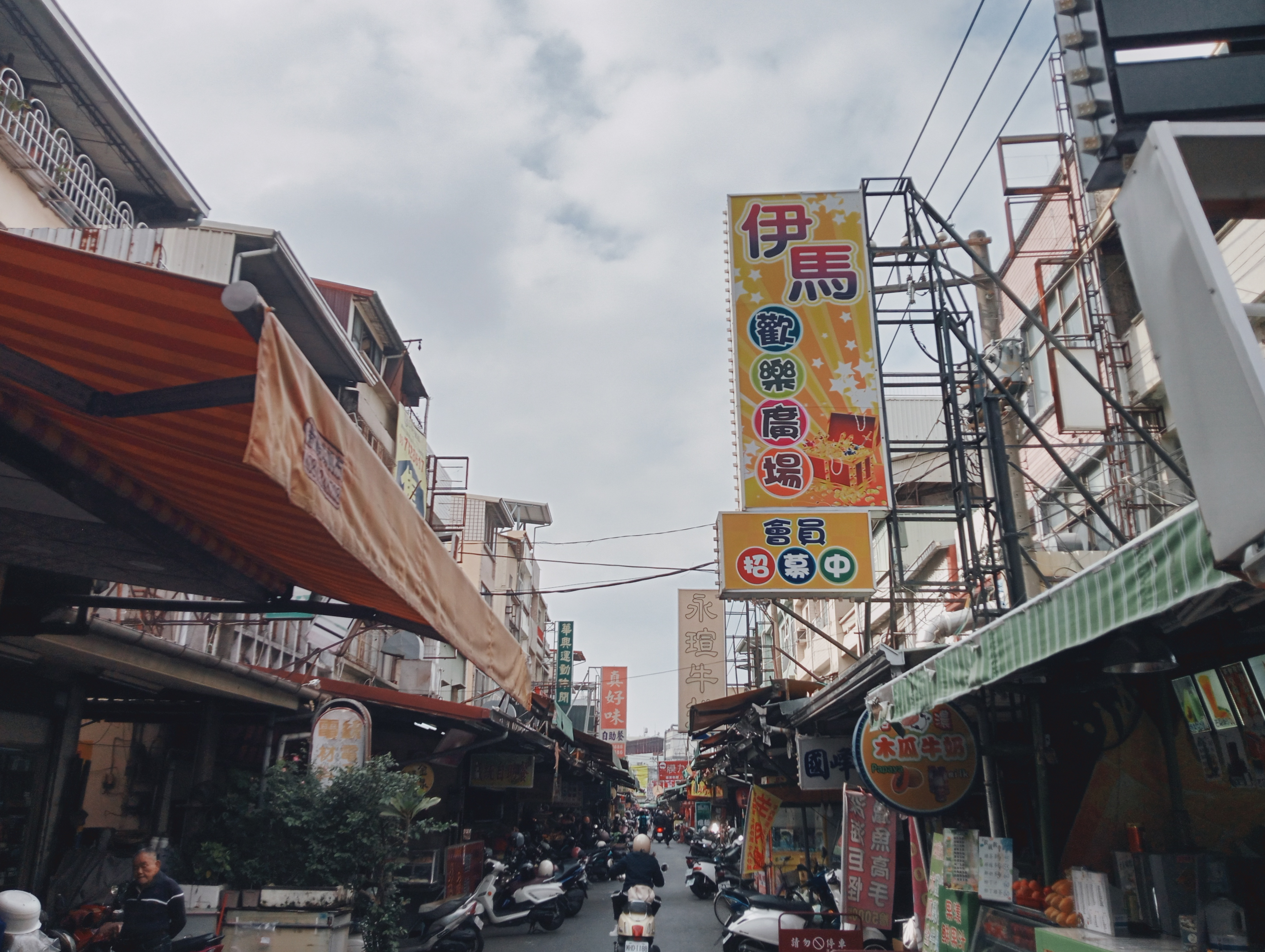
the Minzu Night Market during the daytime

This night market is known for local staples beyond general Taiwanese dishes. Some of these include:

- 肉圓, 大腸粉腸: Handmade glutinous rice meatballs and stuffed sausages; Meatballs that are steamed then fried, with chewy skin and savory pork filling, served with a custom soy-and-broth sauce.
- 香菇肉羹: Mushroom Meat Soup; a thick soup (“geng”) with minced pork and mushroom.
- 屏東土魠魚羹: Pingtung Mackerel Soup; fresh local mackerel (tawu) is battered and fried, then stewed in a sweetish Southern-style fish broth with cabbage and bonito flakes.
- 碗粿: Taiwanese bowl rice cake; Glutinous rice, ground pork, shiitake, preserved egg yolk and braised pork cubes are steamed together, creating a savory pudding served with a light sweet soy‑garlic sauce.

== See also ==
- Liouhe Night Market
- Rueifong Night Market
- List of night markets in Taiwan
