= Dongdamen Night Market =

Night market in Hualien City, Hualien County, Taiwan

Dongdamen Night Market 東大門夜市
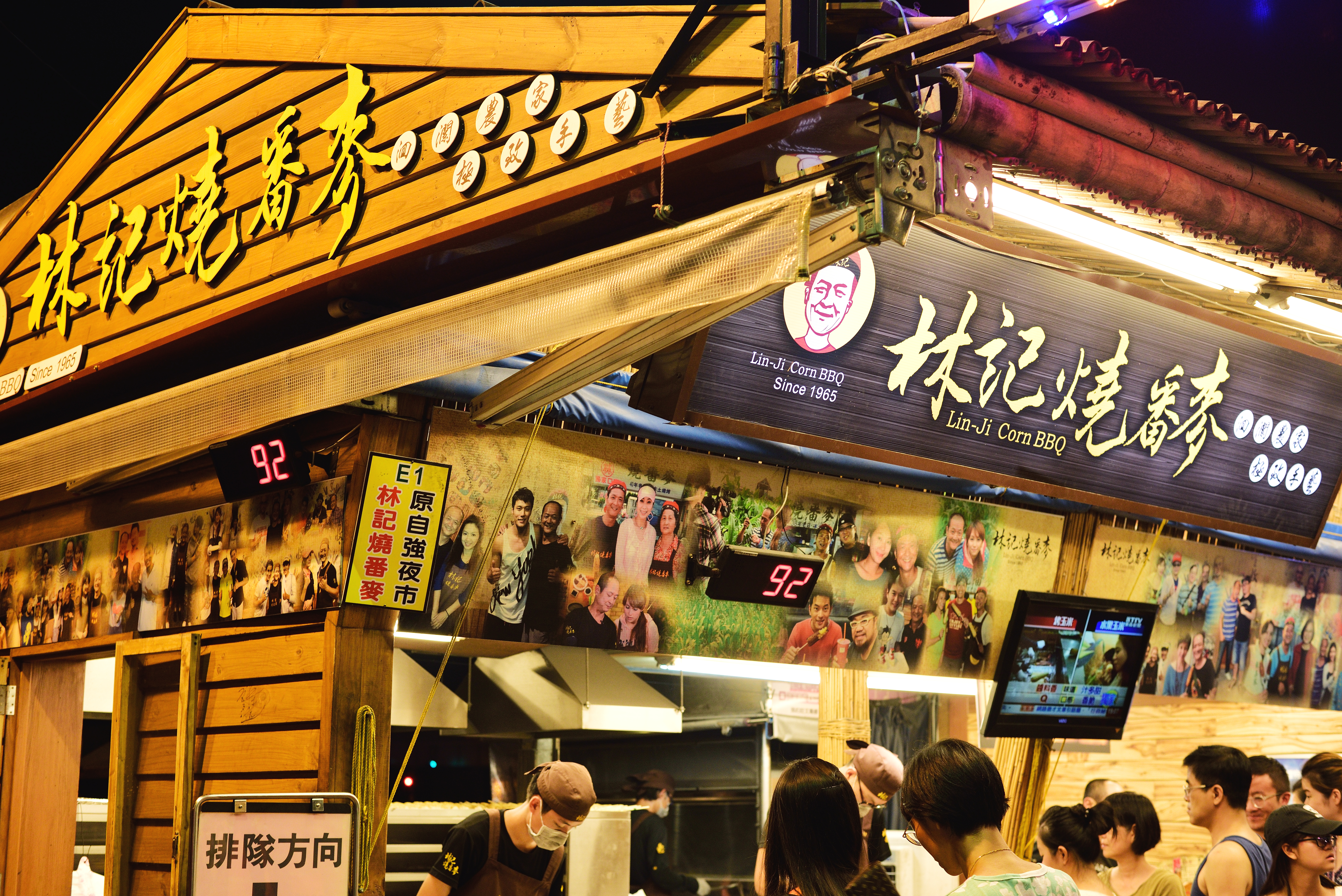
- Location: Hualien City, Hualien County, Taiwan; 23°58′25″N 121°36′41″E
- Opening date: July 2015
- Architect: night market
- Days normally open: 7
- Number of tenants: 400 vendors
- Total retail floor area: 9 hectares
- Interactive map of Dongdamen Night Market

The Dongdamen Night Market or Tungtamen Night Market (traditional Chinese: 東大門夜市; simplified Chinese: 东大门夜市; pinyin: Dōngdàmén Yèshì) is a night market in Hualien City, Hualien County, Taiwan. It is the largest night market in the county.

== Name ==
Dongdamen means big east gate in English due to its location at the eastern edge of Hualien City.

== History ==
The area where the night market stands today used to be the area of the old train station. The night market was opened in July 2015. On 3 June 2019, the night market was engulfed in flame, which started about 1 a.m. The fire damaged the 660 m^{2} area of the night market and burned down 32 stalls.

== Architecture ==
The night market was constructed as part of the 6th rezoning area. It spreads over an area of 9 hectares and consists of Futing Night Market (Chinese: 福町夜市) for Taiwanese cuisine, street of Taiwanese Indigenous cuisine (Chinese: 原住民一條街), Ziqiang Night Market (Chinese: 自強夜市) and street of Mainland China cuisine (Chinese: 各省一條街). The night market also features a center plaza, a tourist information center, an ecology pond and a lookout tower.

== Business ==
Currently there are 400 vendors operating at the night market.

== Transportation ==
The night market is accessible by bus from Hualien Station of Taiwan Railway.

== See also ==
- List of night markets in Taiwan
