= Caotun Night Market =

Night market in Nantou County, Taiwan

Caotun Night Market 草鞋墩人文觀光夜市
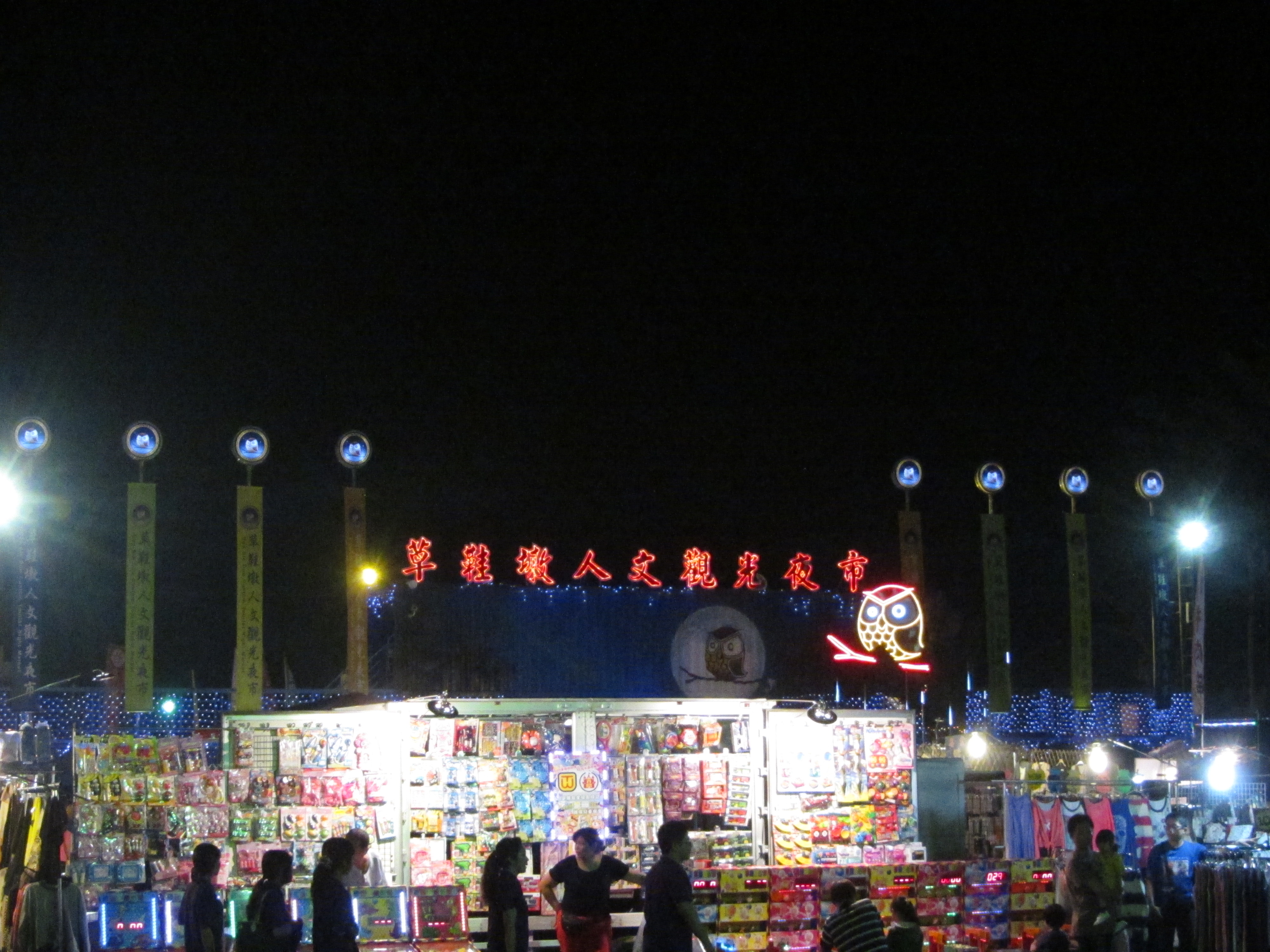
- Location: Caotun, Nantou County, Taiwan; 23°59′19.4″N 120°41′10.9″E
- Environment: Night market
- Days normally open: Weekends
- Interactive map of Caotun Night Market

The Caotun Night Market or Caoxiedun Tourism Night Market (traditional Chinese: 草鞋墩人文觀光夜市; simplified Chinese: 草鞋墩人文观光夜市; pinyin: Cǎoxié Dūn Rénwén Guānguāng Yèshì) is a night market in Caotun Township, Nantou County, Taiwan.

== Features ==
The night market sells various delicacies in their food stalls. Game stalls are also available at the market.

== See also ==
- List of night markets in Taiwan
