= Nanya Night Market =

Night market in Banqiao, New Taipei, Taiwan

Nanya Night Market 南雅夜市
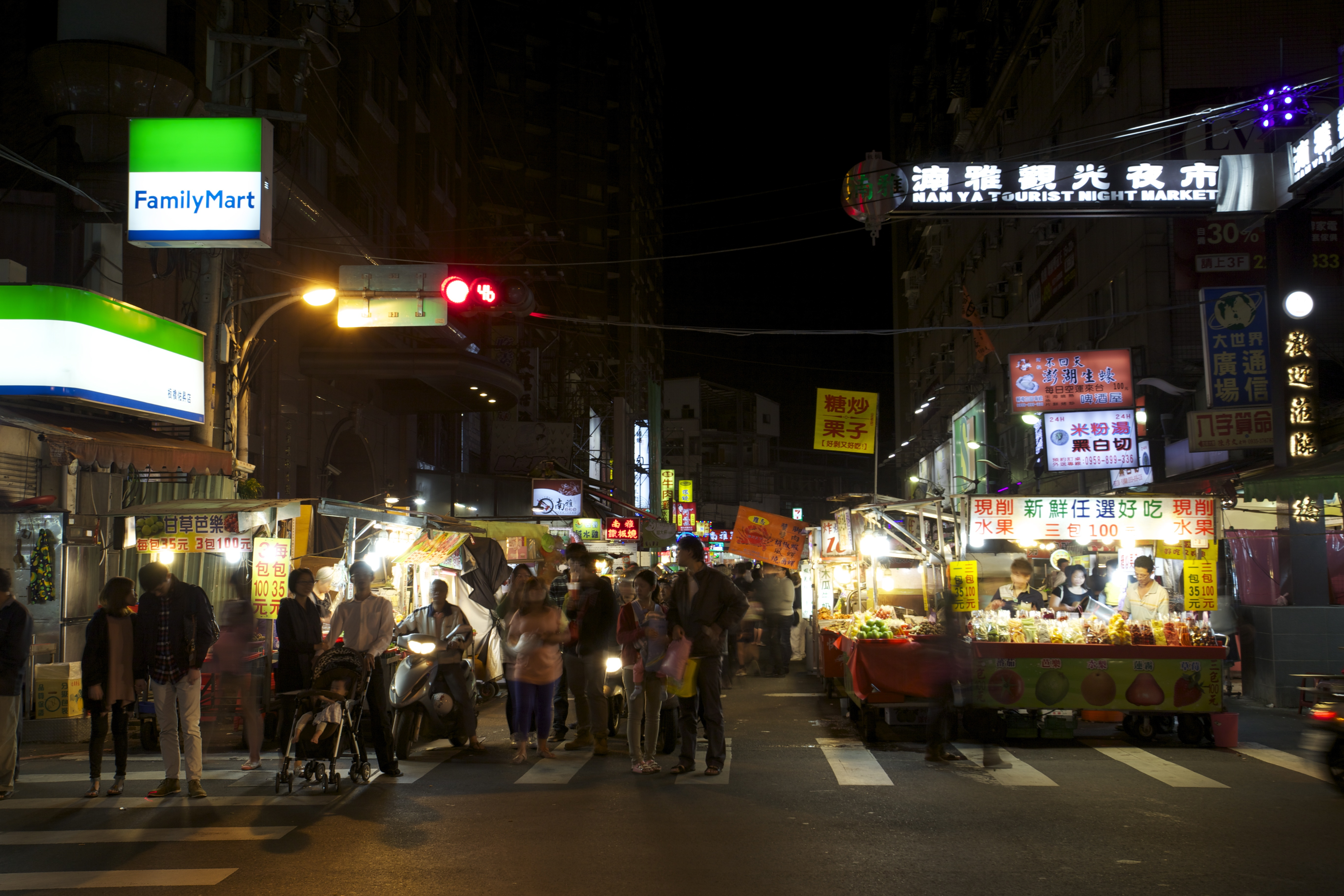
- Location: Banqiao, New Taipei, Taiwan; 25°00′23.1″N 121°27′15.3″E
- Environment: night market
- Interactive map of Nanya Night Market

The Nanya Night Market (Chinese: 南雅夜市; pinyin: Nányǎ Yèshì) or Banqiao Night Market is a night market in Banqiao District, New Taipei, Taiwan.

== Architecture ==
Located at the intersection of Nanya East Road and Nanya South Road, the night market is the largest in Banqiao. It has a funnel shape with wide entrance and narrow alley towards the center.

== Features ==
The night market has a range of food to sell and choices of cheap goods. It also features many fashion and game arcades.

== Transportation ==
The night market is accessible within walking distance South West from Fuzhong Station of Taipei Metro.

== See also ==
- List of night markets in Taiwan
