= Lehua Night Market =

Night market in Yonghe, New Taipei, Taiwan

Lehua Night Market 樂華夜市
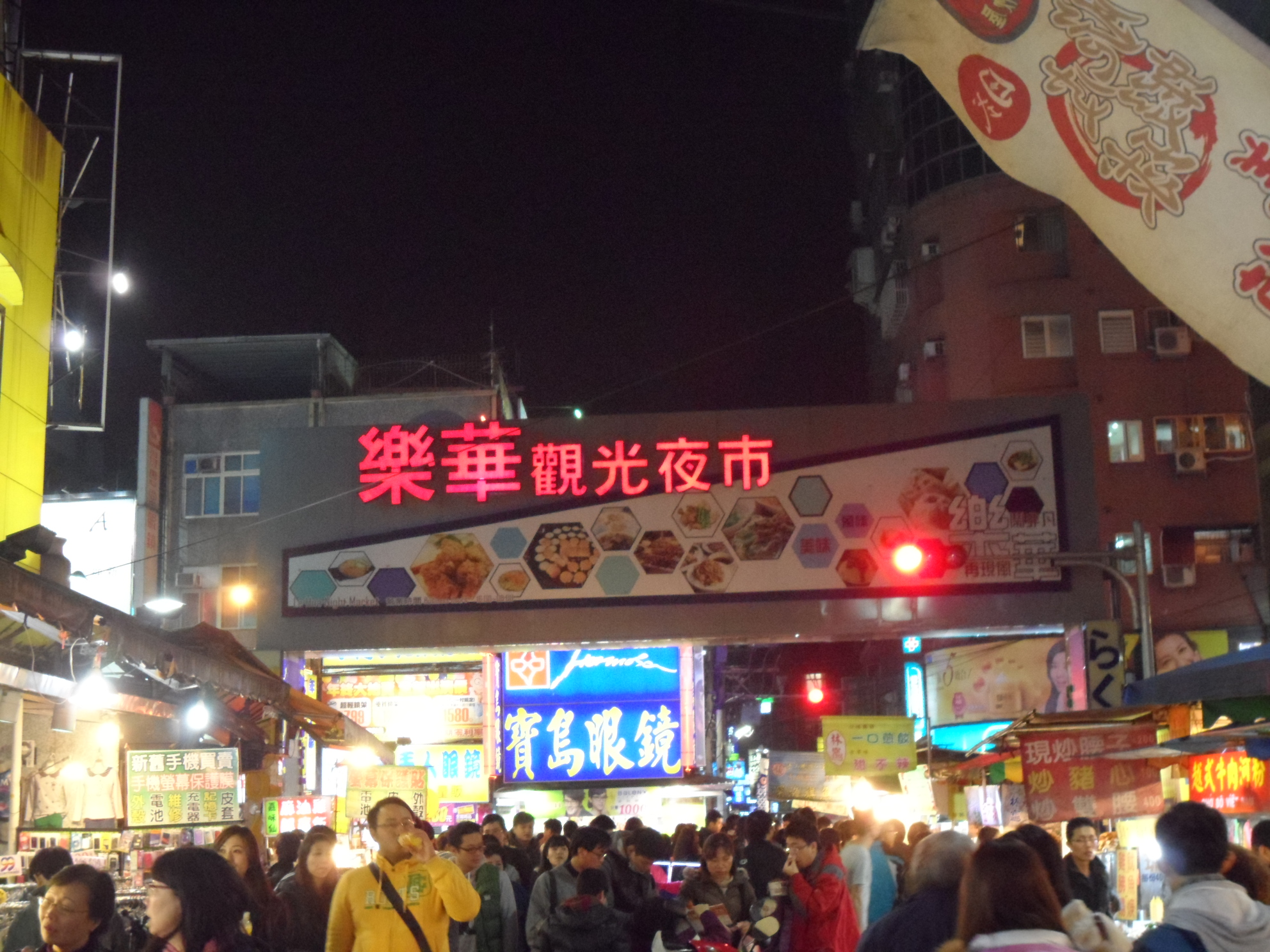
- Location: Yonghe, New Taipei, Taiwan; 25°01′N 121°31′E
- Opening date: 1970s
- Environment: night market
- Interactive map of Lehua Night Market 樂華夜市

The Lehua Night Market (traditional Chinese: 樂華夜市; simplified Chinese: 乐华夜市; pinyin: Lèhuá Yèshì) is a night market in Yonghe District, New Taipei, Taiwan.

== History ==
In 2012, a group filed a complaint to the night market citing the community's safety was compromised by the presence of the night market vendors. In 2015, the night market faced risk of being closed.

== Features ==
The night market, which was set up in the 1970s, offers a rich mix of snack stalls, shopping and entertainment facilities including the KTV chain Party World. Taiwanese food such as rice cakes, tempura, oyster omelet, shrimp and meat stew and shaved ice can be found here. It is often packed during the weekends and most of the stores stayed open until midnight.

== Transportation ==
The night market is accessible within walking distance South of Dingxi Station of Taipei Metro. Other forms of public transportation to get to the night market is by taking a number 5, 57, 214 Express, 227, 304 Chengde, 304 Chongqing N. bus to the Lehua Night Market Stop. There are also YouBike stations nearby to return your YouBike.

== See also ==
- List of night markets in Taiwan
