= Nanjichang Night Market =

Night market in Zhongzheng, Taipei, Taiwan

Nanjichang Night Market 南機場夜市
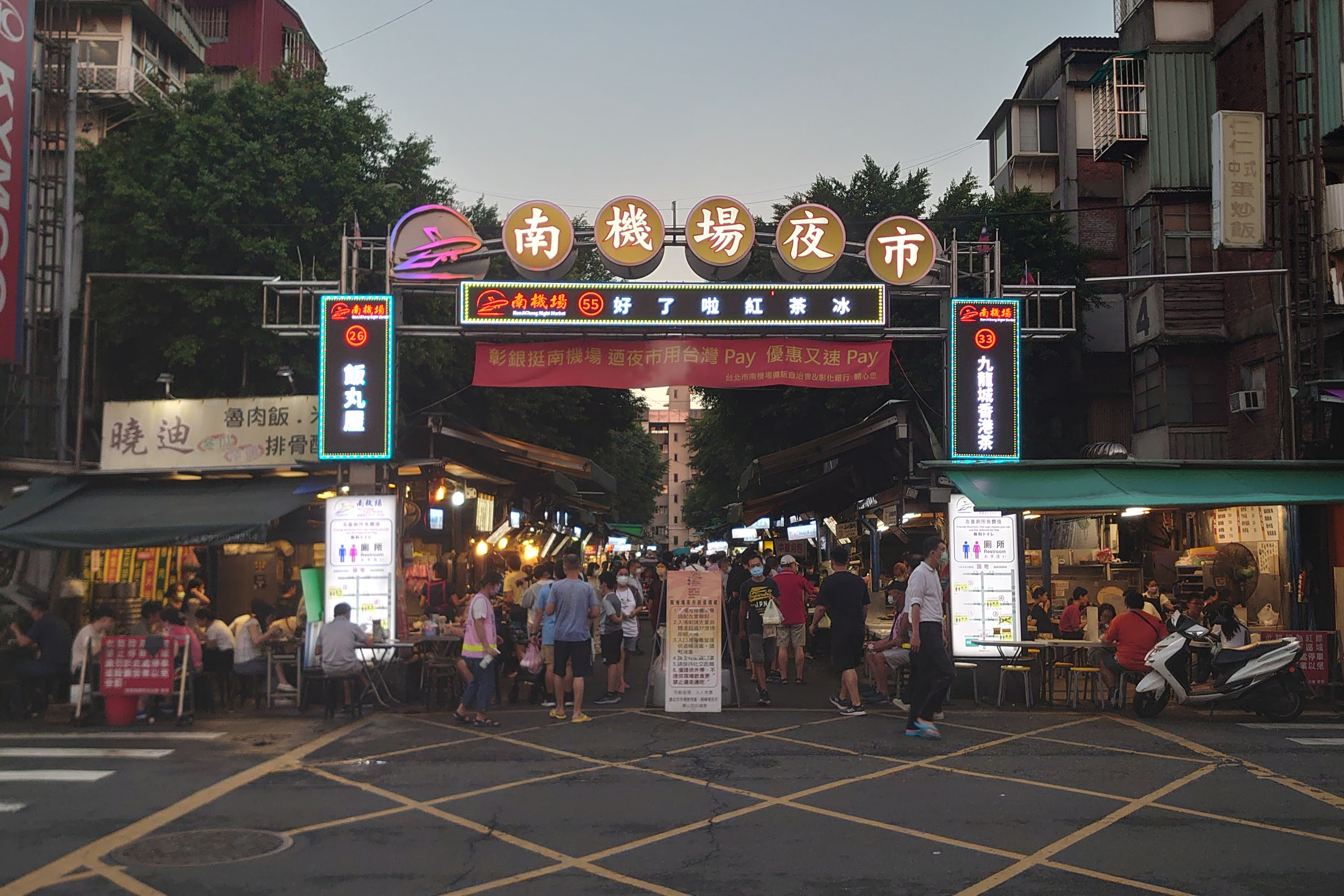
- Nan Ji Chang Night Market entrance
- Location: Zhongzheng, Taipei, Taiwan
- Goods sold: Food
- Website: Official website

Nanjichang Night Market (Chinese: 南機場夜市) is located in Zhongzheng District, Taipei, Taiwan. It is named after Taipei South Airport, which was previously repurposed into a public housing project and has developed into a small but popular night market.

== History ==
Before the establishment of Taipei Songshan Airport in 1936 under Japanese rule, planes arriving in Taipei would stop at a field near Machangding, located south of the current Songshan Airport. Thus, the airfield was coined Taipei South Airport. After the Nationalist government took over Taiwan, the government built public housing for military personnel and their family members on the airport's original site. The housing project caused increased traffic in the area, leading people without professional skills to set up stalls there for a livelihood. As more stalls were established, the site became a popular night market.

Stalls are available at any time, despite the site being a night market. Most customers are residents, and most stalls are food vendors. The market has gained media attention in the 2010s. For example, a Bah-oân stall was featured by CNN and Shaobing, Stinky tofu, and Mayouji stalls were included in multiple years' Michelin Guides.

== Transportion ==
According to its official website, the Nanjichan Night Market can be reached via:

- Taipei Joint Bus System
  - 南機場公寓站：12、204、205、212、212直、212夜、220中山幹線、223、249、250、670、671、673、藍29
  - 國盛國宅站：204、253、630、671
- Taipei Metro: Longshan Temple Station, Xiaonanmen metro station, Xiaan metro station (Under consrustion)
- YouBike：復華花園新城站、國興青年路口/青年公園

== See also ==
- List of night markets in Taiwan
- Taiwan Snacks
