= Linjiang Night Market =

Night market in Taipei, Taiwan

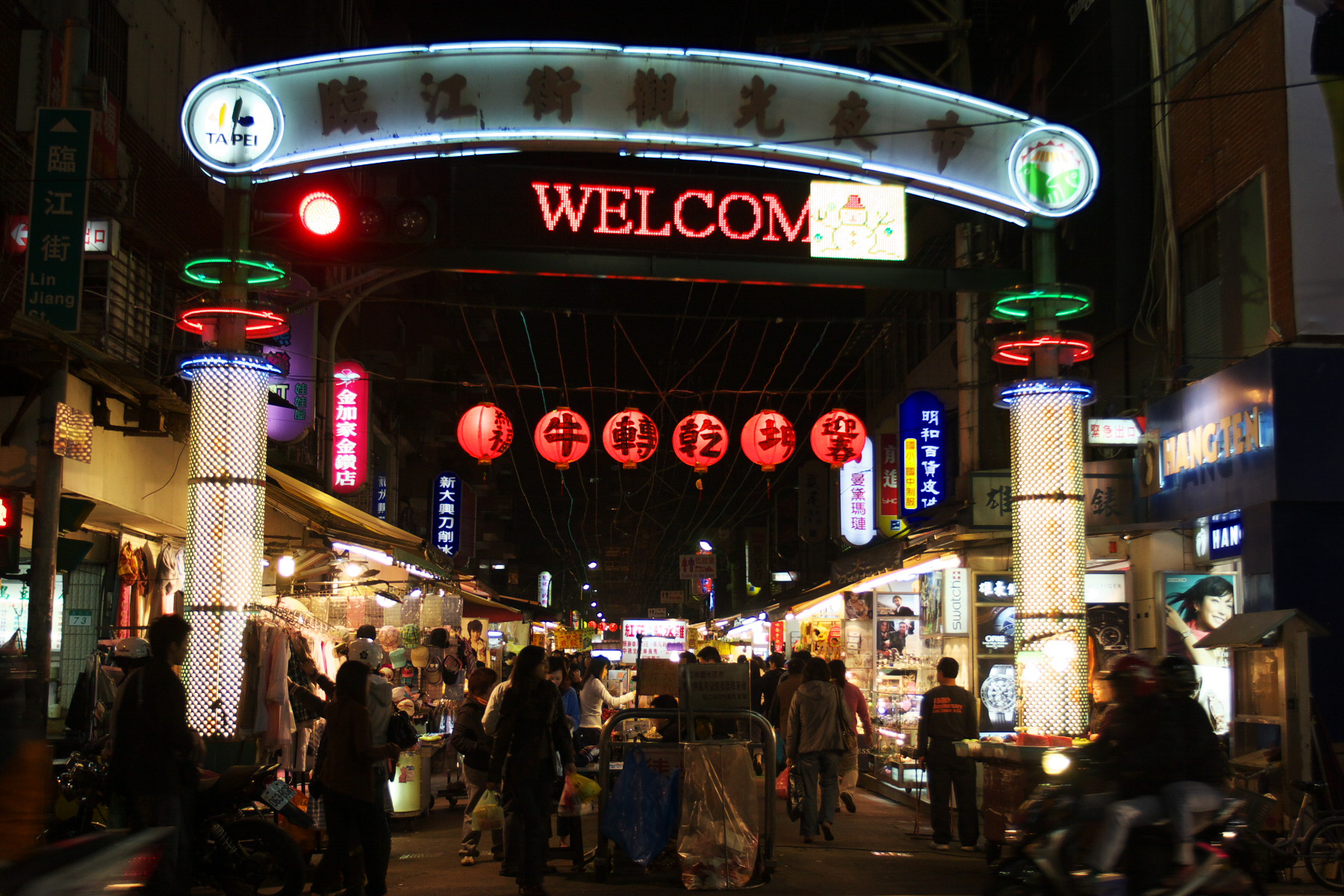
Market sign, 2009

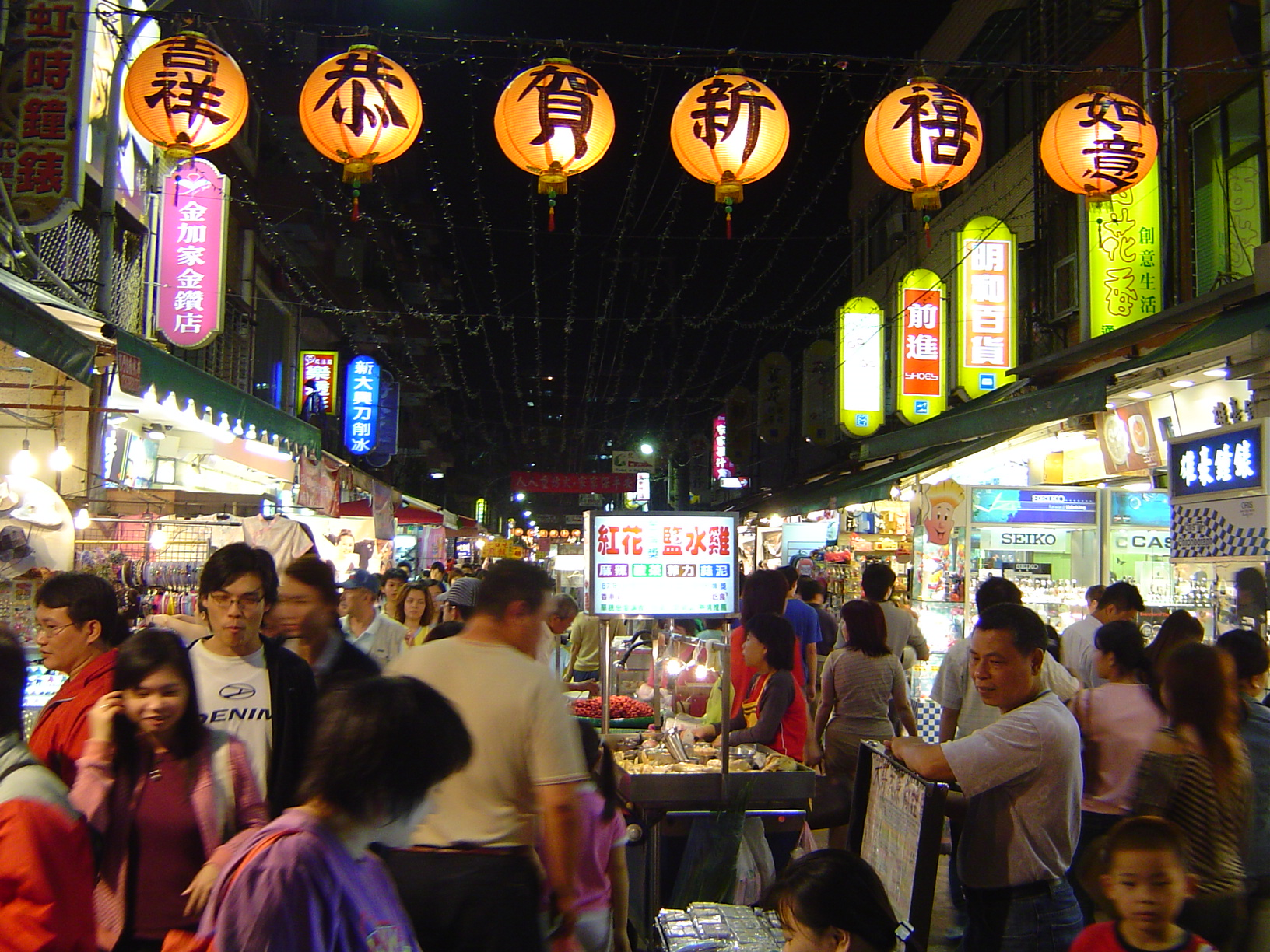
The market in 2004

The Linjiang Night Market (also known as the Linjiang Street Night Market, Linjiang-Tonghua Night Market, or Tonghua Night Market), is a night market in Taipei, Taiwan. The market is known for its barbecue dishes, xiaolongbao, tangyuan (sweet dumplings), and fried sweet potato balls.

Tien Hsiang Stinky Tofu and Yu Pin Yuan Iced and Hot Tangyuan have been recognized by the Michelin Guide.

== See also ==
- List of night markets in Taiwan
- Night markets in Taiwan
