= Liouhe Night Market =

Night market in Xinxing, Kaohsiung, Taiwan

Liouhe Night Market 六合夜市
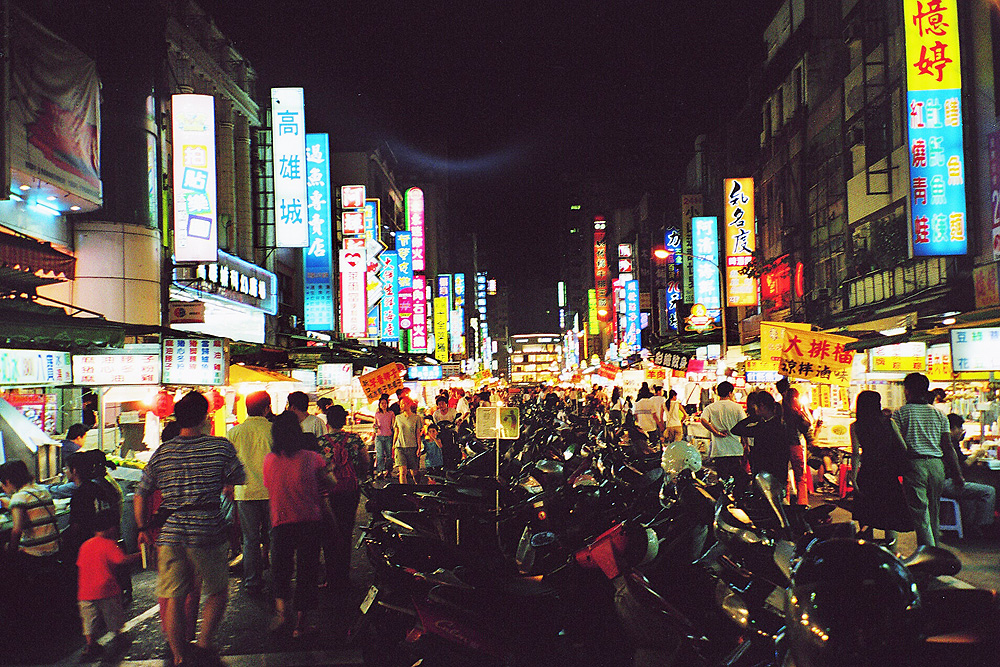
- Location: Sinsing, Kaohsiung, Taiwan; 22°37′58.8″N 120°18′7.9″E
- Opening date: 1950s (as Dagangpu Night Market)
- Environment: Night market
- Interactive map of Liouhe Night Market

The Liouhe Night Market (Chinese: 六合夜市; pinyin: Liùhé Yèshì; Pe̍h-ōe-jī: Lio̍k-ha̍p-iā-chhī) is a tourist night market in Sinsing District, Kaohsiung, Taiwan. It is one of the most popular markets in Taiwan where seafood, handicrafts, clothing, knives, cameras and live animals are sold.

== History ==
In the 1950s, there had been many food stalls stationed in Dagangpu area of Sinsing District collectively known as Dagangpu Night Market (大港埔夜市; Dàgǎngbù Yèshì). Since then, the night market has been developed into a large-scale market known as Liouhe Night Market. Recently the market has begun selling halal foods at its stalls. In 2019, the government provided subsidies to a number of stalls of the night market to encourage them to apply for halal certifications from the International Muslim Tourism Industry Development Association.

== Transportation ==
The night market is accessible by walking distance west from exits 1, 9, and 11 of the Formosa Boulevard Station of the Kaohsiung MRT.

== See also ==
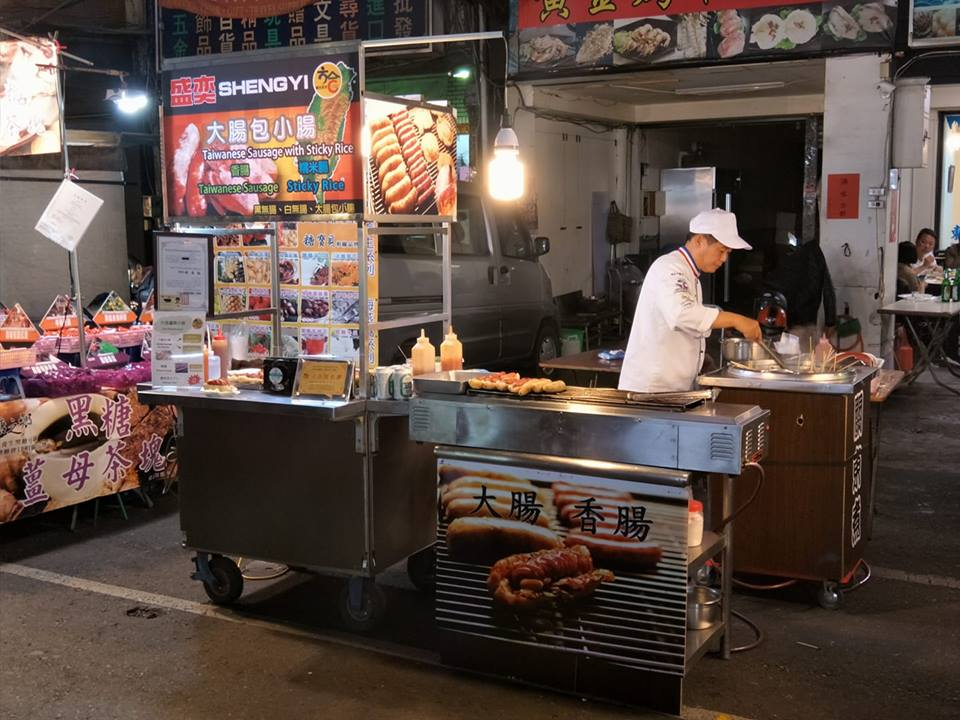
- Sheng Yi Taiwanese sausage with sticky rice(盛奕大腸包小腸)
  Night markets in Taiwan
- List of night markets in Taiwan
