= Fengjia Night Market =

Night market in Xitun, Taichung, Taiwan

Fengjia Night Market 逢甲夜市
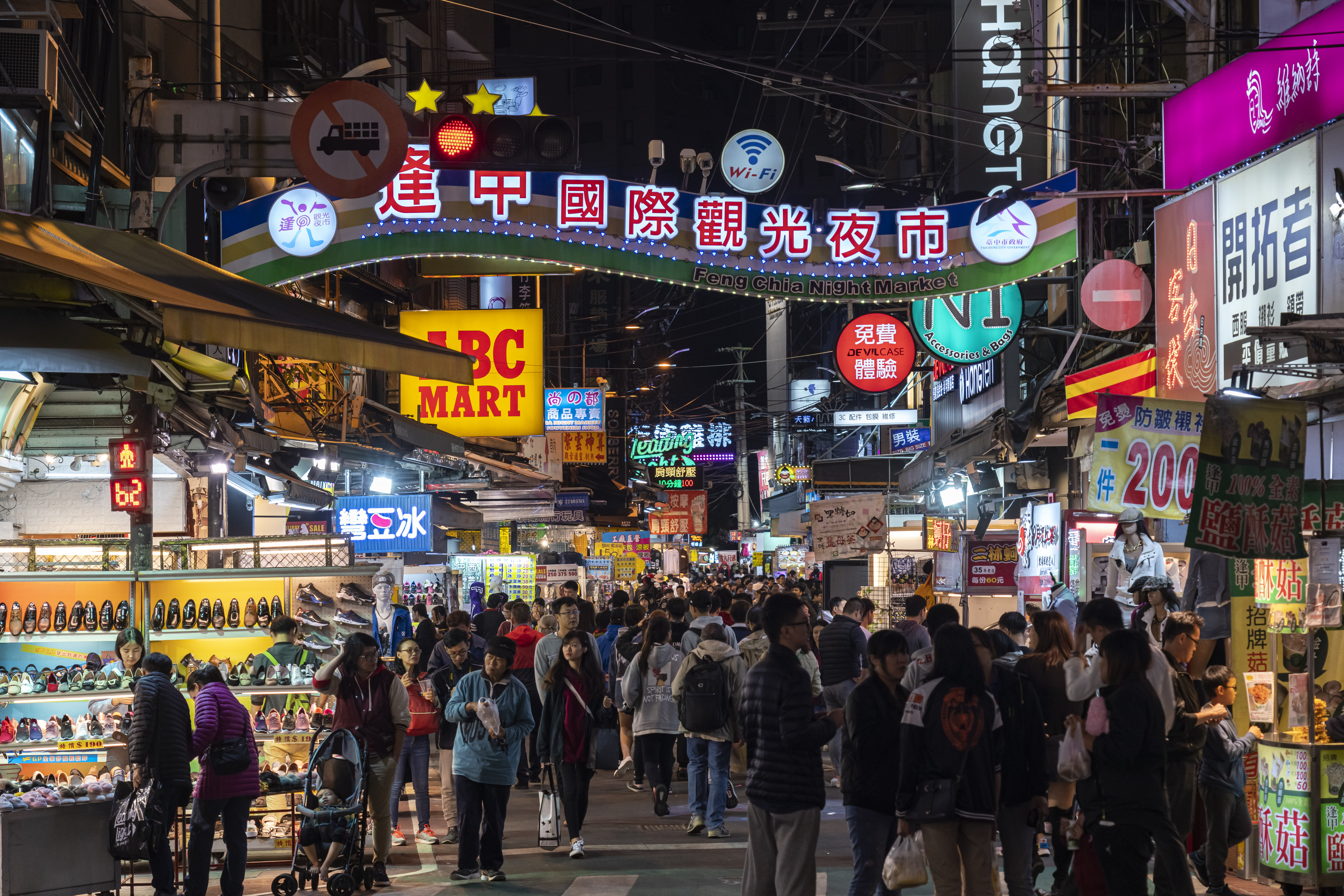
- Location: Xitun, Taichung, Taiwan; 24°10′43.8″N 120°38′47.2″E
- Opening date: 1963
- Environment: Night market
- Interactive map of Fengjia Night Market

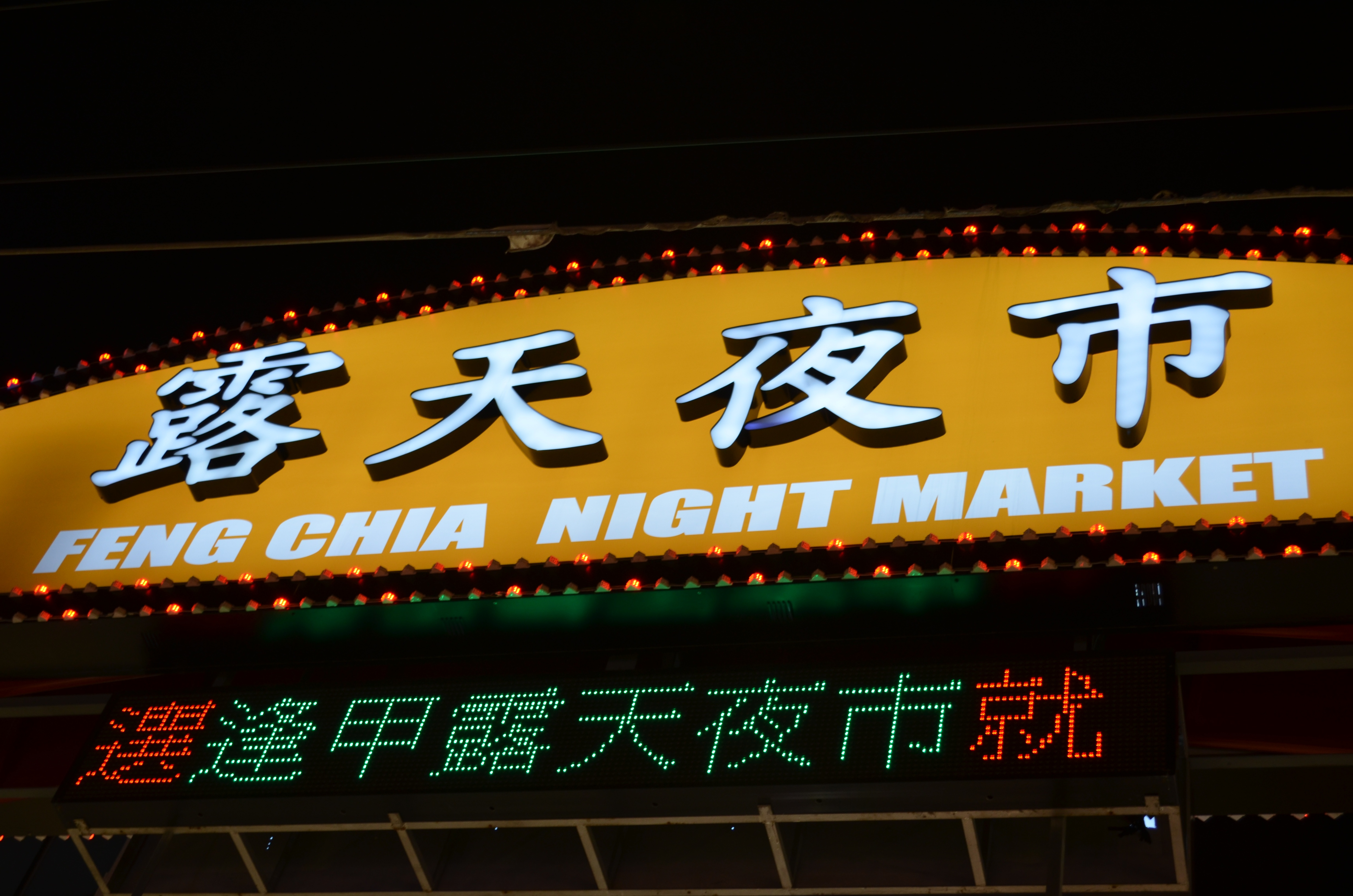
Fengjia Night Market entrance sign

Fengjia Night Market or Feng Chia Night Market (Chinese: 逢甲夜市; pinyin: Féngjiǎ Yè Shì), also called Fengjia Shopping Town, is a night market in Xitun District, Taichung, Taiwan. The market is located next to Feng Chia University. It was claimed to be the largest night market in Taiwan.

== History ==
Fengjia night market was established in 1963, established along with Feng Chia College of Engineering and Business (now Feng Chia University), the rising of the popularity stimulated the business of the nearby residential military dependents' village. Food/drink stands and restaurants were established along Wen-hua road (thus the night market is also called Wenhua night market), then expanding to Fengjia road (逢甲路), Fuxing road (福星路), Xi'an street (西安街) etc.

On 5 October 2006, a managing committee of Fengjia Shopping Town (逢甲購物商城) has been established by the Department of Economic Development of Taichung (台中市經濟發展處), covering the surrounding areas such as Feng Chia night market, Bento street, etc., thus bringing the originally unlicensed operation of the night market under the office governance of Taichung city.

In November 2015, the night market was commended by the Ministry of Economic Affairs for its excellency in management, friendliness to tourists and sustainable practices to the environment.

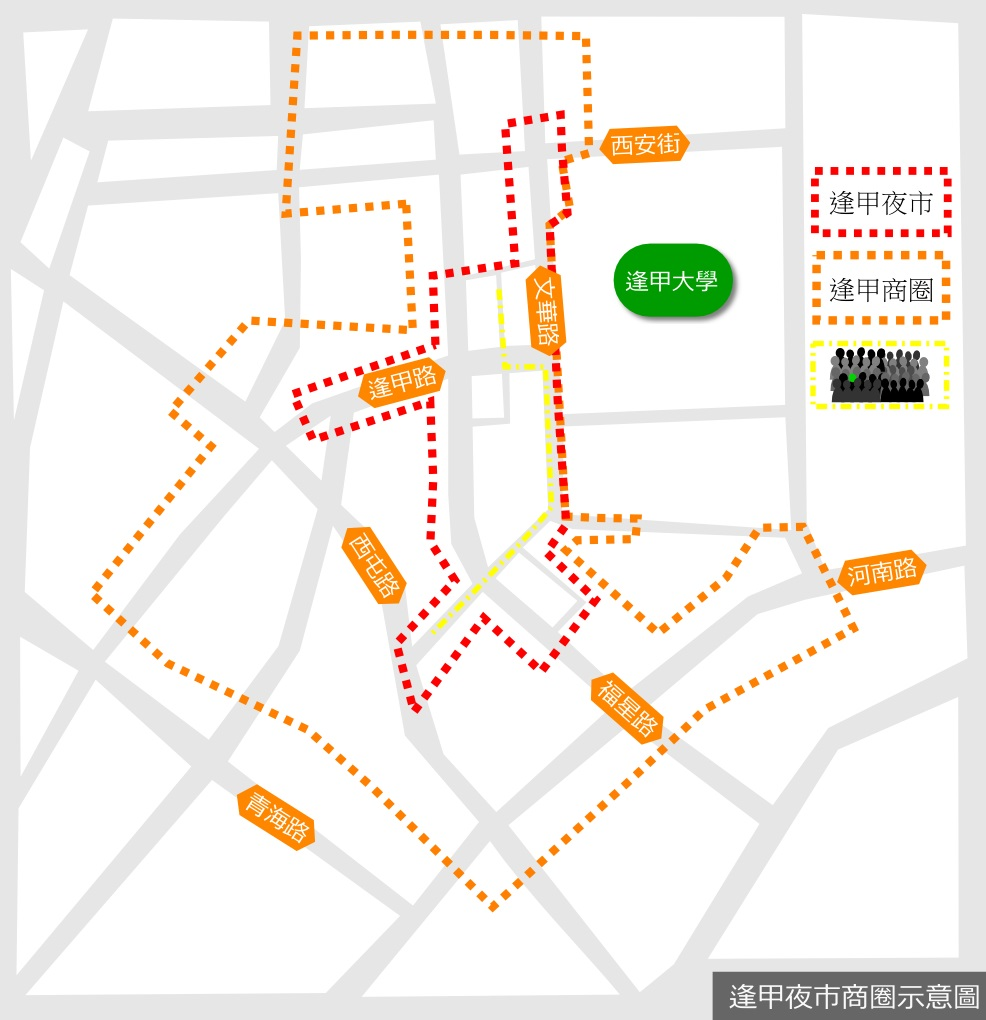
Wenhua Road(Yellow);Fengjia Night market(red);Fengjia commercial district(orange).

== Location ==
Next to Feng Chia University. (逢甲大學)

== See also ==
- List of night markets in Taiwan
