= Luodong Night Market =

Night market in Luodong, Yilan County, Taiwan

Luodong Night Market 羅東夜市
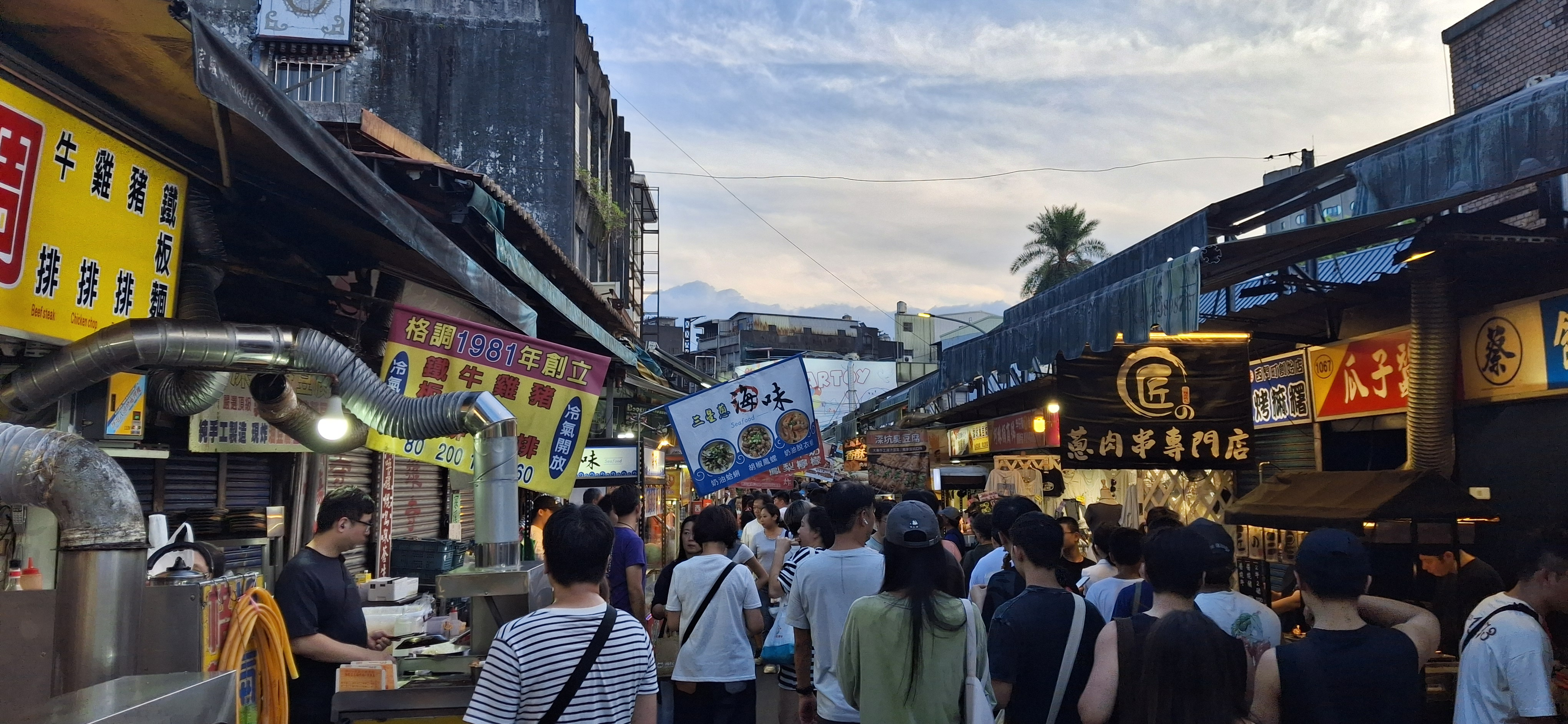
- Location: Luodong, Yilan County, Taiwan; 24°40′38.4″N 121°46′05.6″E
- Environment: night market
- Interactive map of Luodong Night Market 羅東夜市

The Luodong Night Market (traditional Chinese: 羅東夜市; simplified Chinese: 罗东夜市; pinyin: Luódōng Yèshì) is a night market in Luodong Township, Yilan County, Taiwan.

== Features ==
The night market offers local snacks and fashion shops. Local snacks range from mutton herbal soup, iced tapioca with red bean stuffed, and thick rice noodle soup to Yilan specialties, such as ox-tongue-shaped pastry, smoked duckling, etc.

== Transportation ==
The market is accessible within walking distance south west of Luodong Station of the Taiwan Railway or Luodong Transfer Station, which is located directly behind Luodong Station, via the Guoguang/Capital/Kamalan Bus.

== See also ==
- List of night markets in Taiwan
