= Dadong Night Market =

Open-air night market in the East District of Tainan, Taiwan

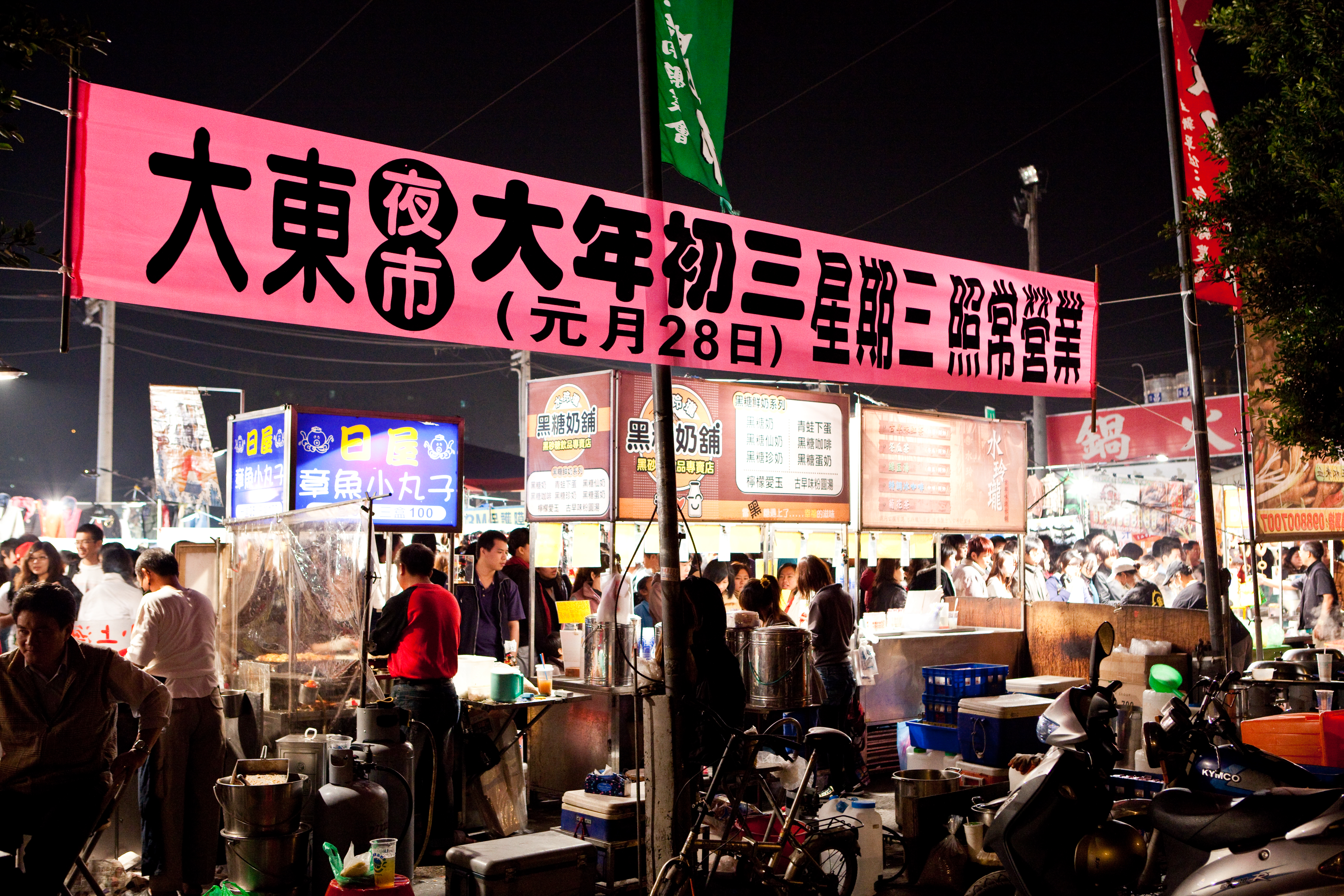
- Shops and stalls in the market, 2008
- Location: No. 276號, Section 1, Linsen Rd, East District, Tainan City, Taiwan 701; Tainan; 22.98261189341393°N 120.21933058842556°E
- Opening date: 9 March 2000
- Days normally open: Monday, Tuesday, Friday
- Interactive map of Dadong Night Market

Dadong Night Market (Chinese: 大東夜市, romanized: dàdōng yèshì) is an open-air night market located in the East District of Tainan. Established on the 9th of March, 2000, the night market has since grown to be one of the most popular night markets with locals and tourists alike, owing to its proximity to a number of schools; along with the growing population of the East District, in which the market is located at. The night market itself hosts around 700 different shops and stalls, all of which offer a variety of goods and services, including street food stalls and clothing stores.

== Overview and history ==
The location on which the night market currently stands used to be an empty plot of land in the East District of the city of Tainan. On March 9, 2000, the first incarnation of the night market opened on the plot of land, initially intended by the original organizers to "beautify the streets". The at-the-time new open-air market then managed to attract roadside vendors and stalls on the neighboring street, all of whom managed to gather together onto the plot of land; along with new vendors, who set up their first streetside stall locations inside of the night market.

Ever since its first opening and incarnation in 2000, the night market has become one of the most well-known in the city for both locals and tourists alike, where it is now regarded as a major tourist attraction of the city. The night markets' land is the property of the Tainan city government, who designated it as a "public facility reserve land" (Chinese: 公共設施保留地, romanized: gōnggòng shèshī bǎoliú dì).

In 2022, Dadong Night Market was turned into one of Taiwan's first night agricultural markets, as part of the year's Tainan International Mango Festival. The agricultural night market was also opened in conjunction with over 100 promotional events that had been started since June of the same year.

On August 30, 2023, the government lease on the plot of land to the night markets' operators expired, which triggered a government auction for the land. On the 9th of September, the original operators' bid for the night markets' land failed to win, which lead to the land being officially leased to another competitor bidder in the auction, Huidi Industrial Company. This triggered various protests, demonstrations and strikes by the night markets' stall operators and vendors, concerning the potential relocation of the night market from its original position, along with the higher operational and rental costs that may potentially be incurred when hosting the stalls under the new owners' management. Eventually, in response to the widespread criticism, the night market itself was forced to split in half into independently operated portions, with one half being leased to the original operators and management team, under the original name; and the other half being leased to the new winners of the markets' auction, under the new name 大東東夜市 (dàdōngdōng yèshì).

== Products ==
The night market consists of over 700 street stalls of various kinds, ranging from food stalls and street stalls which sell a variety cheap plastic toys; to department stores and other local entertainment options. The night markets' food stalls, in particular, sell all kinds of unique and exotic foods (including street snacks) and drinks (nearly all of which are local delicacies in Taiwan), including roasted corn, chicken buttocks, and papaya milk.

As part of the variety of entertainment options available at the night market, there was also once a night market mascot (named the "Night Duck" by the organizers) present at the night market, in order to entertain locals and tourists. In conjunction with the launch of the night markets' mascot, there was also a competition hosted, which involved people taking pictures with the mascot and posting it to the city's government social media pages. As of November 2025, there are now currently plans to bring the Night Duck to Tainan's other major night markets.

== Gallery ==
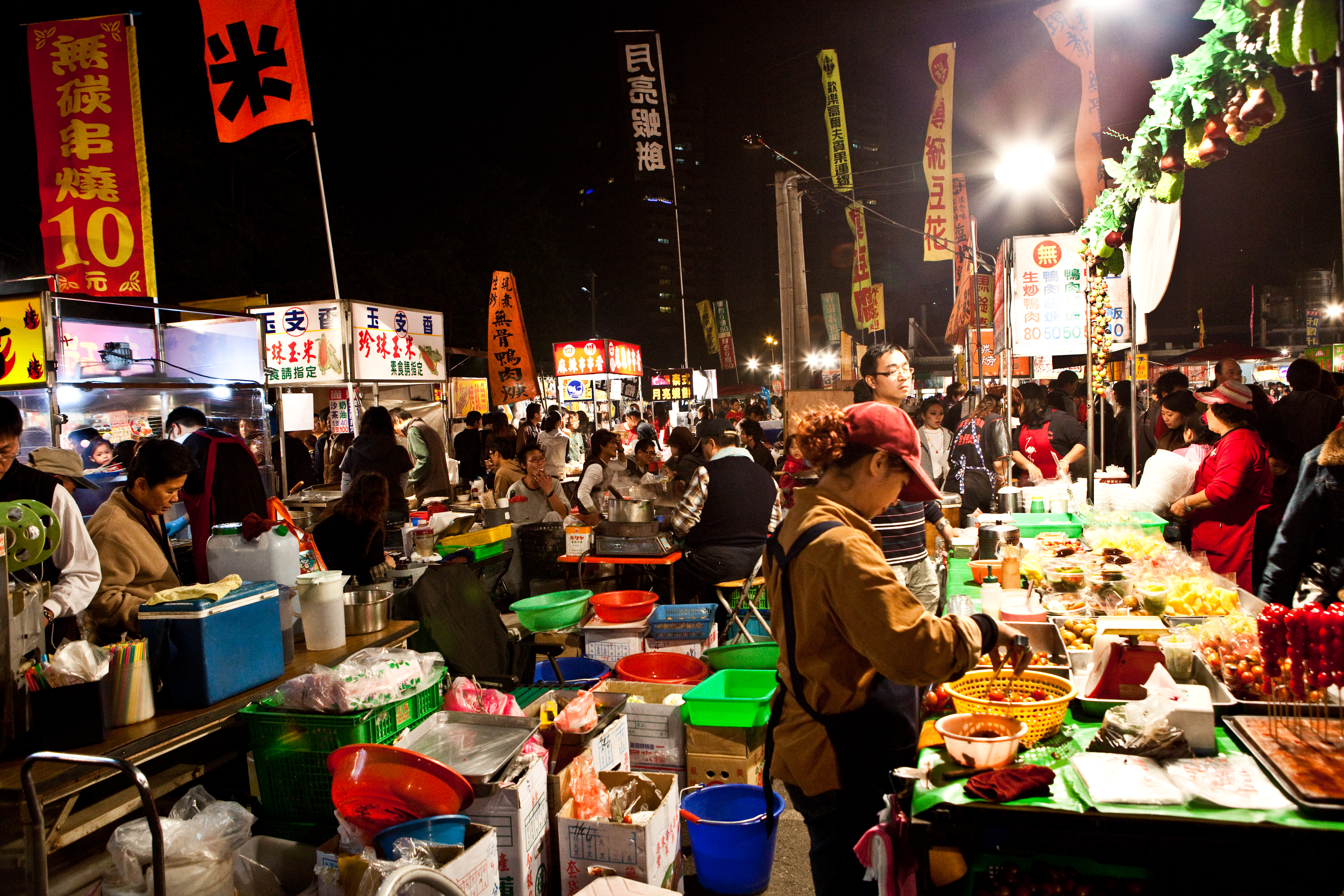
Food stalls present in the night market, 2008

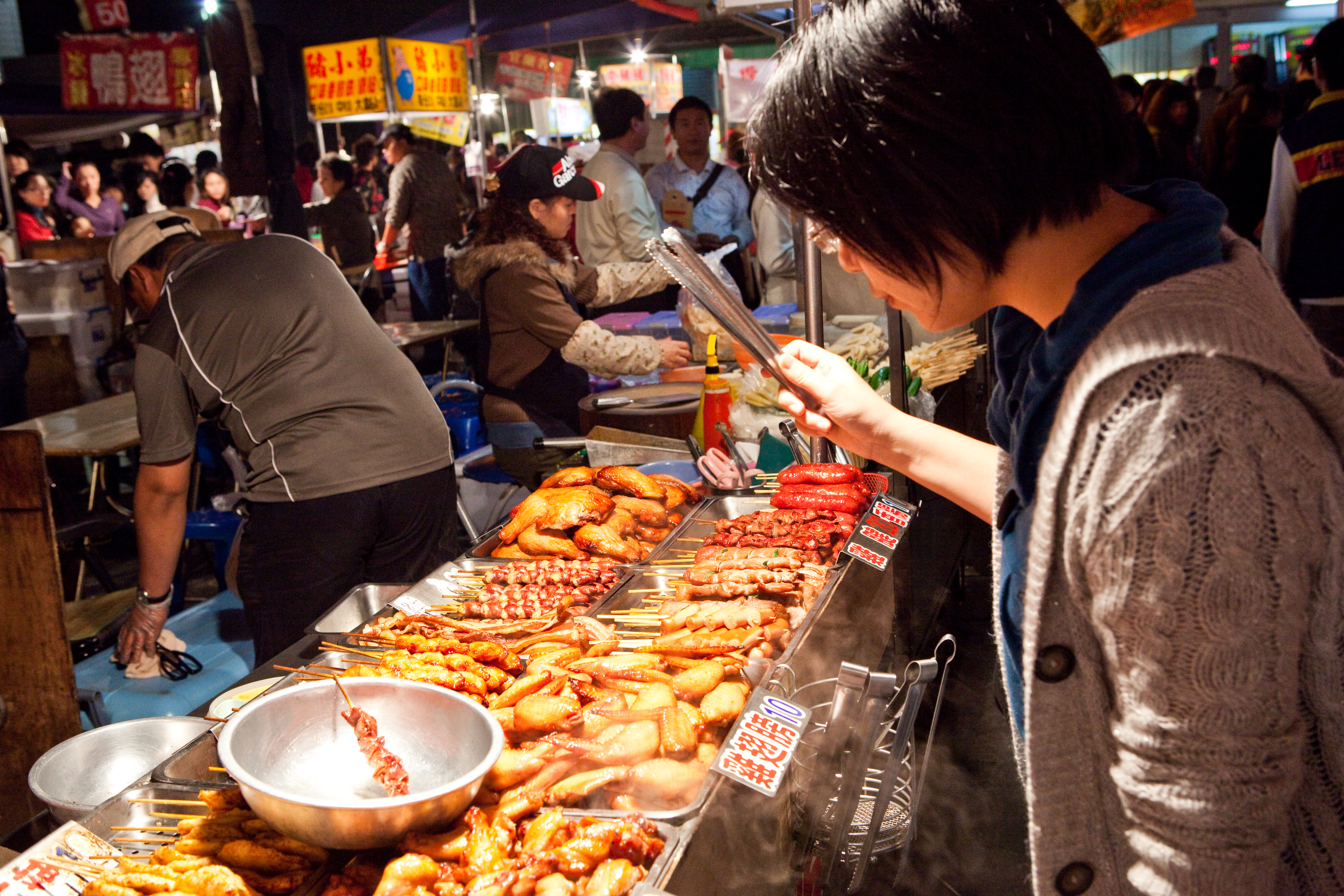
Locals browsing the selection of snacks on display at the night market, 2008
