= Keelung Miaokou Night Market =

Night market in Keelung, Taiwan

Keelung MiaoKou Night Market 基隆廟口夜市
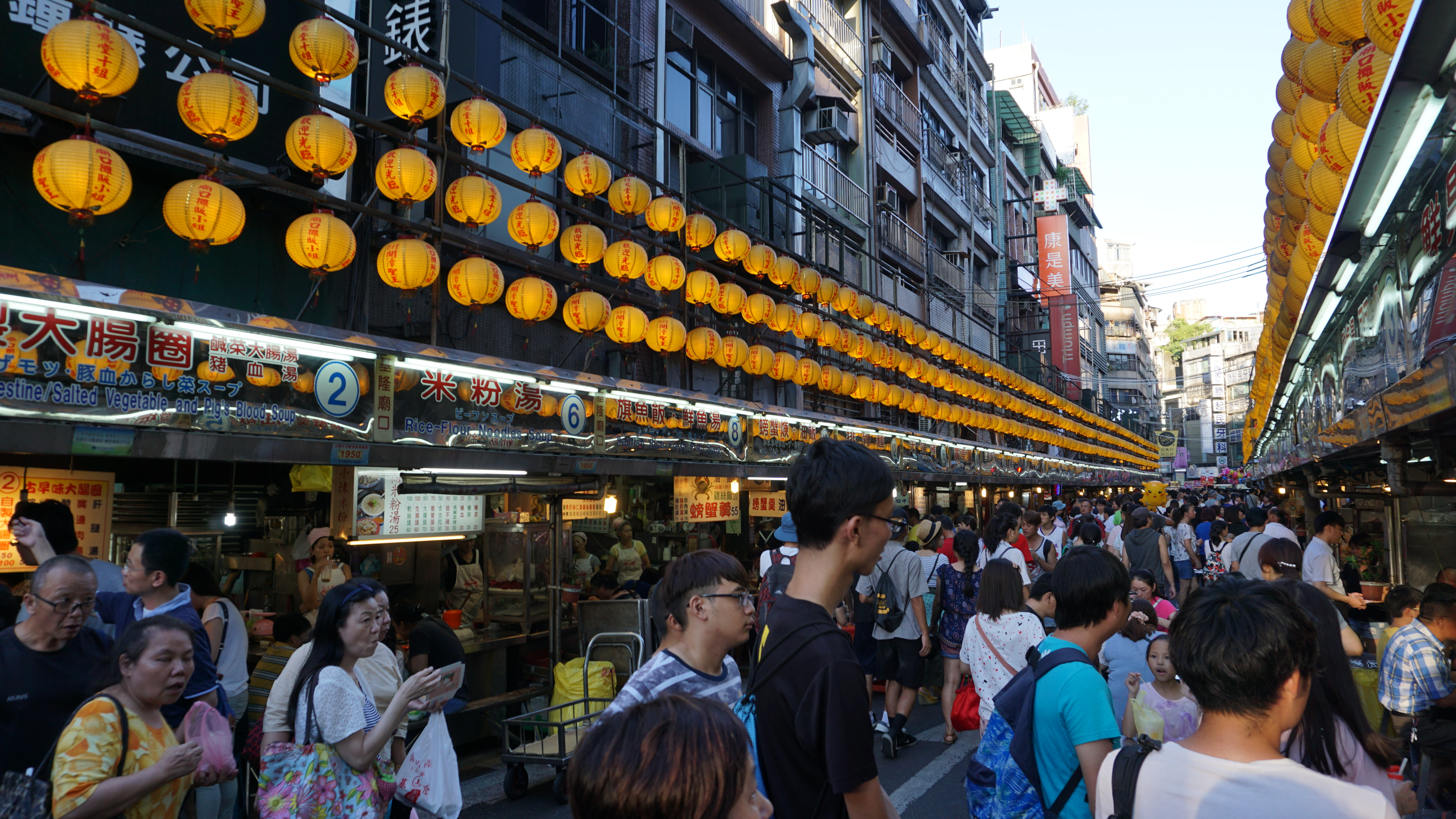
- Location: Ren-ai, Keelung, Taiwan; 25°7′43″N 121°44′35.5″E
- Environment: night market
- Interactive map of Keelung MiaoKou Night Market 基隆廟口夜市

The Keelung MiaoKou Night Market, (Chinese: 基隆廟口夜市; pinyin: Jīlóng Miàokǒu Yèshì) is often referred to simply as MiaoKou (廟口, lit. 'front of the temple') by locals, is a night market and marketplace in Ren-ai District, Keelung, Taiwan. In 2021, Tatler ranked it among the 20 best-known food markets internationally. The market has 200 stalls.

== See also ==
- Night markets in Taiwan
