= Night markets in Taiwan =

Street markets

Night market in Hualien, Taiwan

Night markets in Taiwan (Chinese: 夜市; pinyin: yèshì) operate in urban or suburban areas between sunset and sunrise. A few, such as Huaxi Street Tourist Night Market (or Snake Alley), use purpose-built marketplaces, but most occupy either sidewalks or even entire streets that carry vehicle and pedestrian traffic by day. Some night markets in smaller side streets and alleys feature retractable roofs. Most night markets operate daily and feature a mixture of individual stalls selling clothing, consumer goods, xiaochi (similar to snacks or fast food), and specialty drinks. The atmosphere is usually crowded and noisy with hawkers shouting and fast-paced music playing over loudspeakers. Taiwanese night markets have evolved over the years from small, local gatherings to noisy streets lined with vendors, who must adhere to regulations placed on their activities by the Taiwanese government.

== History ==
Similar markets have existed in Chinese culture, where clusters of hawkers sometimes operated past sunset, but modern night markets did not emerge until after World War II in denser urban areas. To cater to migrant workers in a rapidly-industrializing society, vendors offered traditional xiaochi and inexpensive versions of banquet food.

In the 1960s, mass-produced goods such as shoes, toys, and garments that were produced in Taiwan started being sold in night markets. The recession in the 1970s expanded the presence of these goods in night markets, as manufacturers shifted their attention from international to domestic markets, in their wake displacing the Chinese medicine, handicrafts, and fortune telling that used to occupy these spaces. By the 1980s, night markets' increasing popularity attracted a larger variety of vendors, including gift shops, higher-quality garments, and chain restaurants. Night markets then diverged from traditional wet markets into popular culture. Counterfeit items used to be common in night markets, but more stringent enforcement of copyright laws in the 1990s led to their decline.

== Description ==
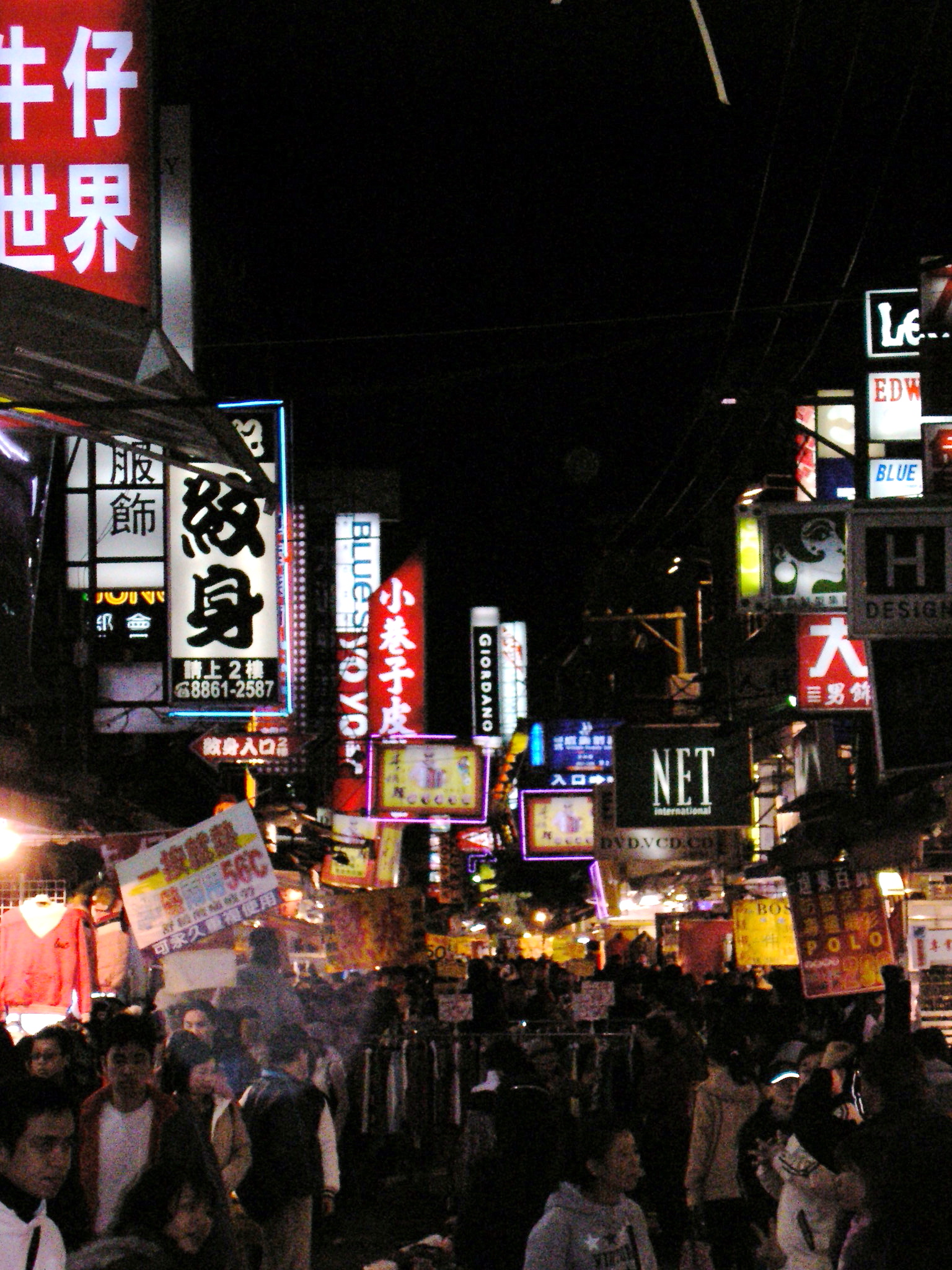
Shilin Night Market, Shilin, Taipei, Taiwan

Night markets in Taiwan are known for xiaochi, a category of food translating to "small eats". Served in small portions at inexpensive prices, xiaochi is usually eaten in an informal setting, either on small folding tables or while walking.

Though some of the xiaochi foods available change from year to year with passing fads, certain xiaochi foods, such as oyster omelets and stinky tofu, persist and have become staples in many night markets. Foreign influences, especially Japanese and American, are also present in night markets. Sometimes, the night markets of a city, or even just one particular market, become well known for a certain type of food that is unique to the area. For example, Tainan has become known for its ta-a noodles and "coffin cakes", bread baked into the shape of a stuffed, hollowed out coffin.

Taiwanese night markets have been evolving to suit changing consumer tastes and demographic patterns. This has led to both markets and vendors taking steps to improve their environmental friendliness, entertainment quality, and global food offerings. The Taiwanese Environmental Protection Administration has provided funds to night markets to minimize their ecological impact through reducing plastic use and lowering carbon emissions.

In recent years (since around 2014) several night markets have begun offering designated quiet hours between 09:00 PM and 11:00 PM, aimed at providing a calmer experience for elderly visitors and tourists who prefer less crowded conditions.

=== Vendors ===
Vendors practice a type of small-scale entrepreneurship, run, for the most part, by family. The vendors are recognized and protected by law. They are required to pay taxes and have licenses. Merchants are managed through their night market committee. The consent of the committee is required to acquire a license. Tourist night markets are classified as between formal and informal businesses, and provide a way for local people to take part in the Taiwanese tourist industry.

== Notable night markets ==
=== Northern Taiwan ===
==== Raohe Street Night Market ====
Running 600 meters from Fuyuan Street to Ciyou Temple, Raohe Street Night Market is located in the Taipei's Songshan District on Raohe Street. In Taipei, it was the second night market to be considered a tourist destination.

==== Shilin Night Market ====
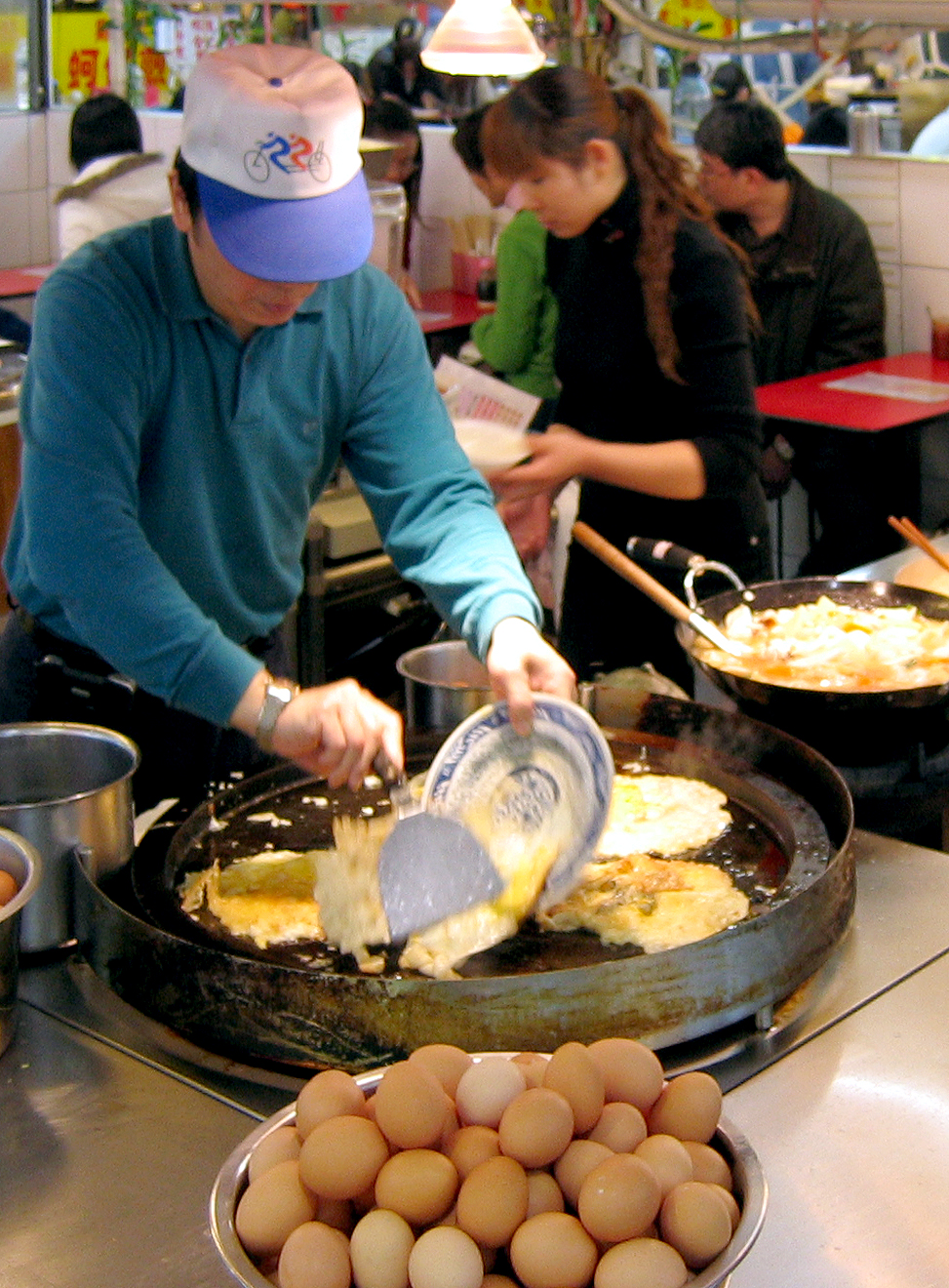
A hawker is making oyster omelets in Shilin Night Market, Shilin, Taipei, Taiwan.

Shilin Night Market is one of the most famous and largest night markets in Taiwan, located in Taipei. It first opened in 1899, and is now famous for its various eateries selling authentic Taiwanese snacks. The market is along the route to the National Palace Museum, making it a good next stop for museum visitors. Contrary to the misleading names, the night market is located right across the street from Jiantan Metro Station, rather than the next Shilin Metro Station.

The night market consists of two different sections. The durable goods section is surrounded by the Yang Ming Cinema on Anping Street. The food section consists of food vendors on the opposite side of the Jiantan Metro Station.

==== Linjiang Night Market ====
The name "Linjiang Night Market", is unfamiliar to some Taipei residents who better know the night market as "Tonghua Street Night Market", which has been known for some time as a popular shopping area. It is located in Daan District near Taipei 101 and the neighboring Xinyi District.

==== Shida Night Market ====
Located near National Taiwan Normal University, known to locals as Shida (lit. Teacher Big), this night market's student presence cultivates a casual and trendy atmosphere. Beyond the usual selection of street food, Shida Night Market is notably more boutique-oriented compared to other popular spots. The night market has shrunk in recent years, though, due to neighborhood complaints and rezoning of the area. It can be accessed by the Taipower Metro Station.

==== Keelung Temple Night Market ====
The Keelung Miaokou Night Market (基隆廟口夜市; Jīlóng Miào Kǒu Yèshì) was started to serve the needs of the many worshipers who came to the popular Dianji Temple (奠濟宮; Diànjì Gōng) to pray for fortune, good luck, and health, or to seek answers to their problems. The night market centers on the neighboring area of the temple. Over 60 registered food stalls are here. One of the most famous snacks at the night market is dingbiancuo (鼎邊趖), which is a rice noodle soup made with mushrooms, bamboo shoots, dried tiger lilies, dried shrimp, oysters, and shredded pork. Other famous snacks include butter crabs, eel stew, and Taiwanese tempura. Because Keelung is a port city, fresh seafood is another feature of the night market. A Keelung specialty and particularly popular drink is paopao ice, which is ice shaved and beaten up into fine, smooth, snow-like texture and then flavored with fruity jams and nuts.

=== Central Taiwan ===
==== Fengjia Night Market ====
Fengjia Night Market is located in Xitun District, Taichung, along Fuhsing Road and Wen Hua Road. It extends along those two roads and even touches Chijian Night Market. It is also known as the Wenhua Night Market, and is located near Feng Chia University and Overseas Chinese University. Students from these two schools make up many of the customers here. During the weekday evenings, around 30 to 40 thousand shoppers are there, while on the weekends, it has many more. Feng Chia Night Market is best known for its prices and variety. Altogether, an estimated 15,000 shops, restaurants, and stalls are in the market. Much fashionable clothing, accessories, toys, electronic products, and the latest music CDs and DVDs are sold in shops or stalls, while food stalls and restaurants offer snacks from around the world. In addition, many snacks have been invented locally by the food stall or restaurant owners, including many now seen in Taiwan's other night markets, such as deep-fried salty and crispy chicken ribs (see Taiwan fried chicken), cheese potatoes, pearl milk tea, 4-in-1 combo juice, and Japanese-style chicken ribs are some famous examples.

==== Tunghai Night Market ====
This night market has been known as one of the most prosperous areas, though it is located on the edge of Taichung and about 20 minutes from the city center. It has grown from just a few shops to a whole commercial district that extends from the Tunghai University.

==== Fengyuan Myaudung Night Market ====
People once gathered around the local Tzu-Chi Temple, where merchants served the crowds of people who encircled the courtyard and the temple. Room was left on the side of the temple during an expansion project and was leased out to vendors. The Fengyuan Myaudung Night Market was formed and continues to serve the residents and tourists of Taiwan.

==== Chingcheng Night Market ====
Chingcheng Night Market (精誠夜市) is located in Changhua near Ching Cheng High School. In the past, the owners tended to park their stands on the Lin Sen Road, and a famous traditional Chinese physician, Gao Sai, lives nearby, so Chingcheng Night Market has also been known as Gao Sai Night Market (高賽夜市).

=== Southern Taiwan ===
==== Liouhe Night Market ====
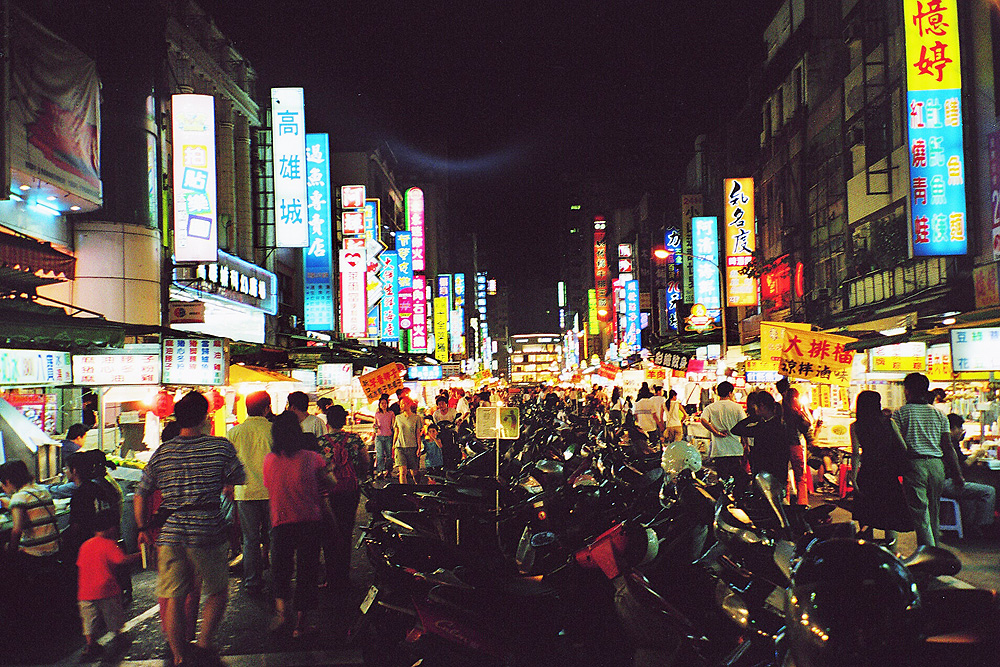
Liuhe Night Market

As early as the 1950s, food stalls started to gather in the vacant lot near Dagangpu in Kaohsiung's Sinsing District. It was first called Dagangpu Night Market; since then, the market has grown over the decades and is now called Liouhe Night Market.

The market is best known for its numerous eateries. Due to its location a short distance from Kaohsiung Railway Station, in the daytime, it is a thoroughfare, while in the evening, it transforms into a big, open-air shopping arcade. The stalls here mostly offer foods, snacks, or games, and some sell daily commodities and clothing. Dozens of steak houses can be seen clustered here and the key selling point is low prices, targeting family customers. Because Kaohsiung is in the tropical zone and near the sea, stalls or shops selling various ice lollies, flavored crushed ice, and cold drinks are also very popular. Fresh seafood is another specialty. It grew in the 1940s to 1950s to be known as one of Kaohsiung's most popular night markets. The venue is only open to pedestrians.

==== Ruifeng Night Market ====
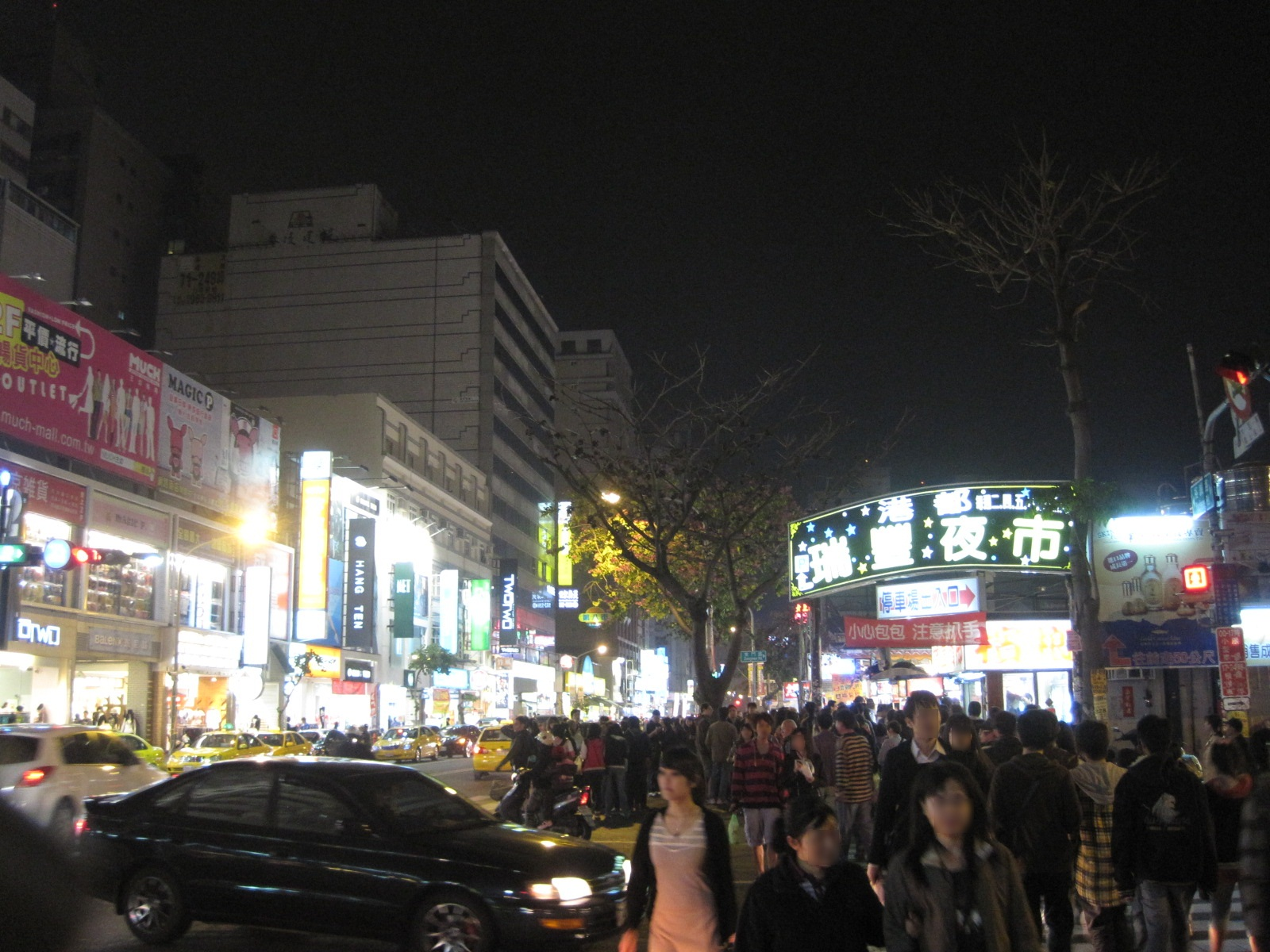
Ruifeng Night Market

Situated in northern Kaohsiung, Ruifeng Night Market is known of its large variety of snacks at low prices. It is usually considered the most popular night market among locals.

==== Kaisyuan and Jinzuan Night Markets ====
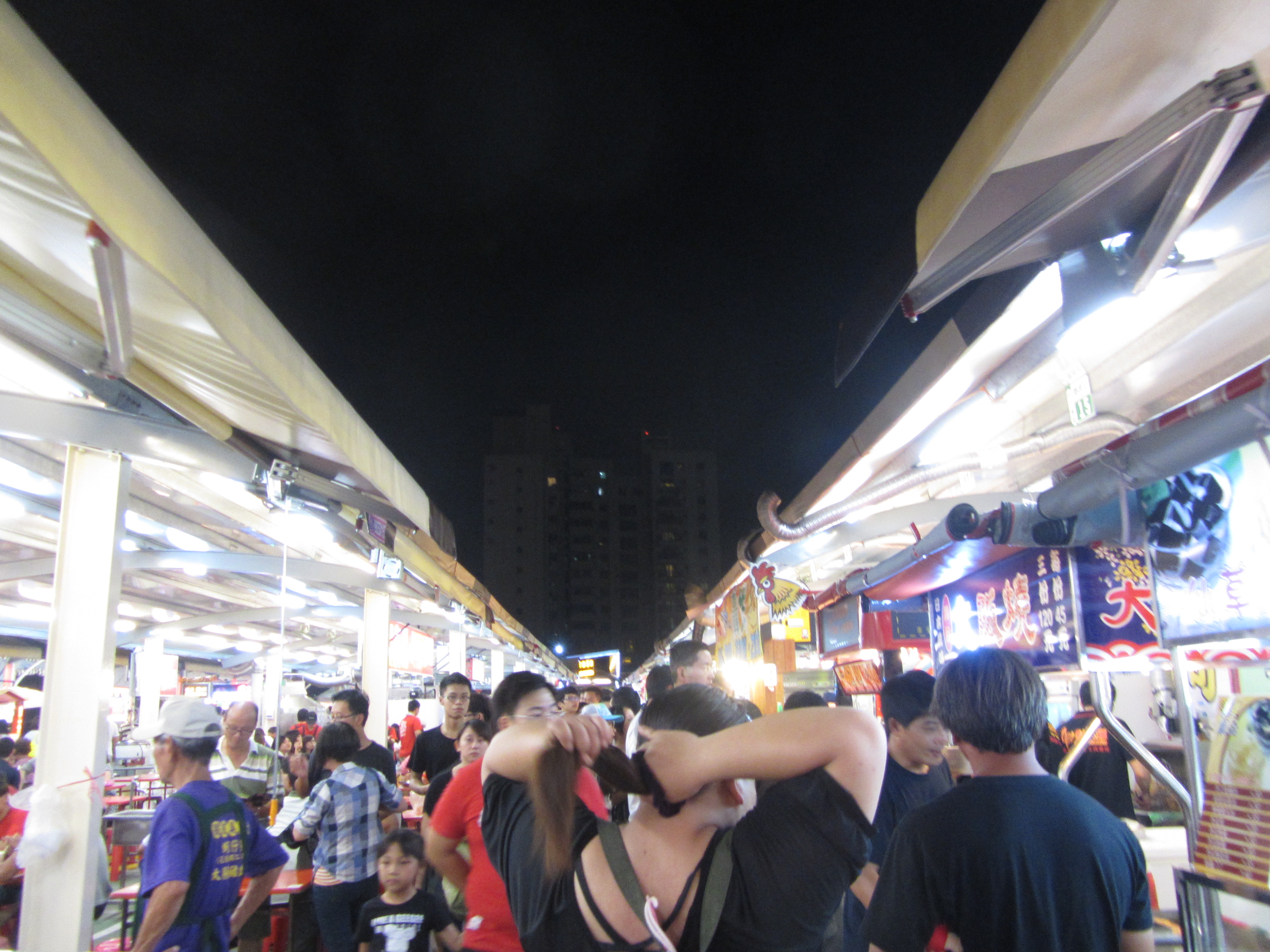
Jin-Zuan Night Market

The two adjacent night markets, Jin-Zuan Night Market and Kaisyuan Night Market, opened in 2013, and were said to be the two largest in Taiwan, but has since shrunk 60% in size. They feature eateries more commonly found in restaurants, such as teppanyaki and conveyor-belt sushi, as well as unique designs such as road signs and a fancy restroom.

==== Minzu Night Market ====
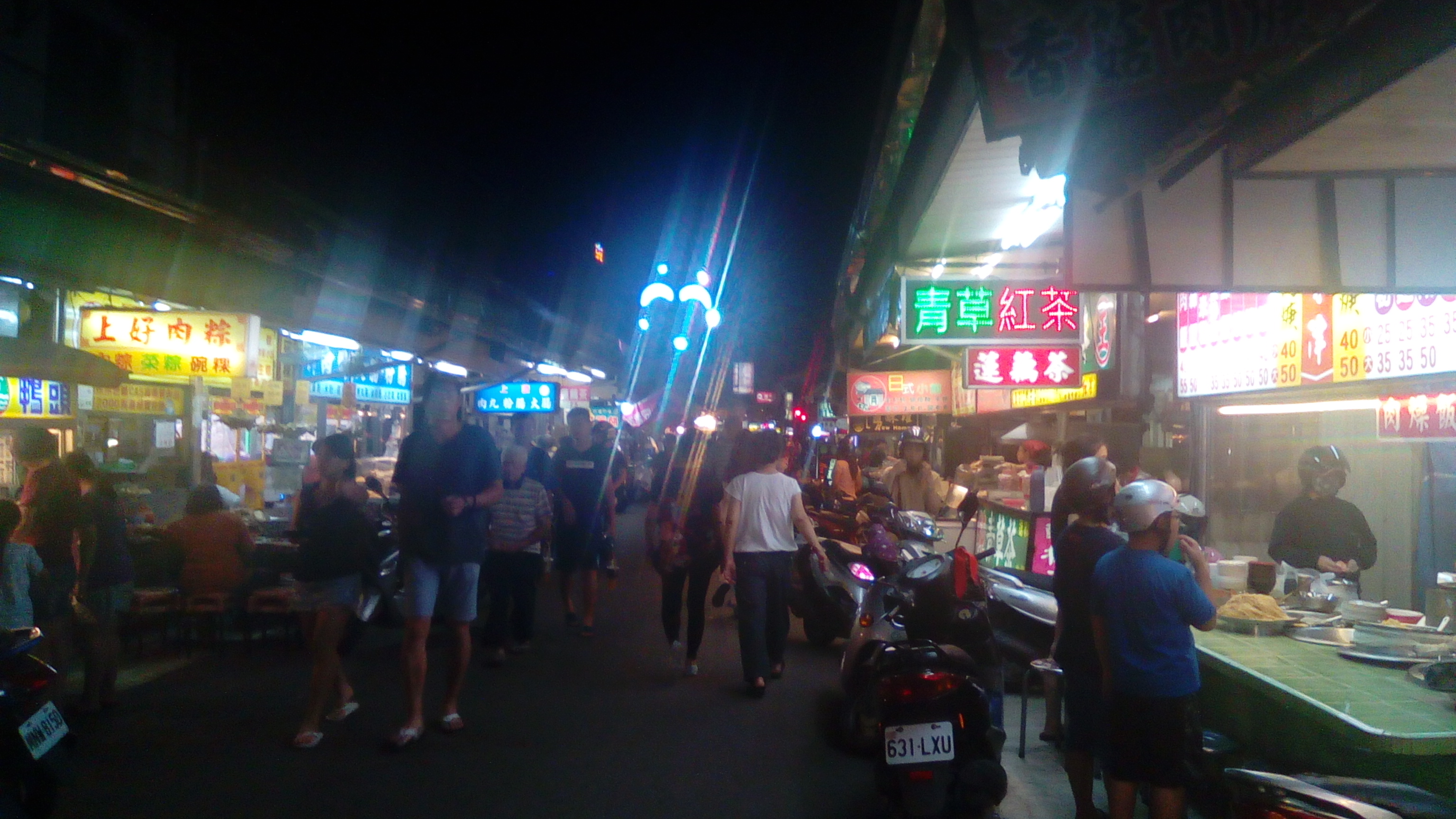
View of Minzu Night Market in 2019

Minzu Night Market (Chinese: 民族夜市; pinyin: mínzú yèshì; also known as: Pingtung Tourist Night Market) is a tourist night market in Pingtung City, Taiwan. Although the market is considered a "night market", many vendors also operate during the day. The market is centered around Minzu Road near its intersection with Minquan Road and stretches over 200m long with about 100 stalls.

==== Tainan Flower Night Market ====
Situated in North District, Tainan, at the junction of He-Wei Road and Hai-An Road, the Tainan Flower Night Market is voted one of the best night markets in Taiwan. Open on evening of Thursday, Saturday, and Sunday, it has varieties of local and foreign hawker food, attire, and entertainment, among the market's attraction.

=== Eastern Taiwan ===
==== Nanbin Night Market ====
During the day, the area is crowded with beach goers, but at night, it turns into an active night market. It is located in Nanbin Park, Hualien City. Carnival games go on every night.

==== Luodong Night Market ====
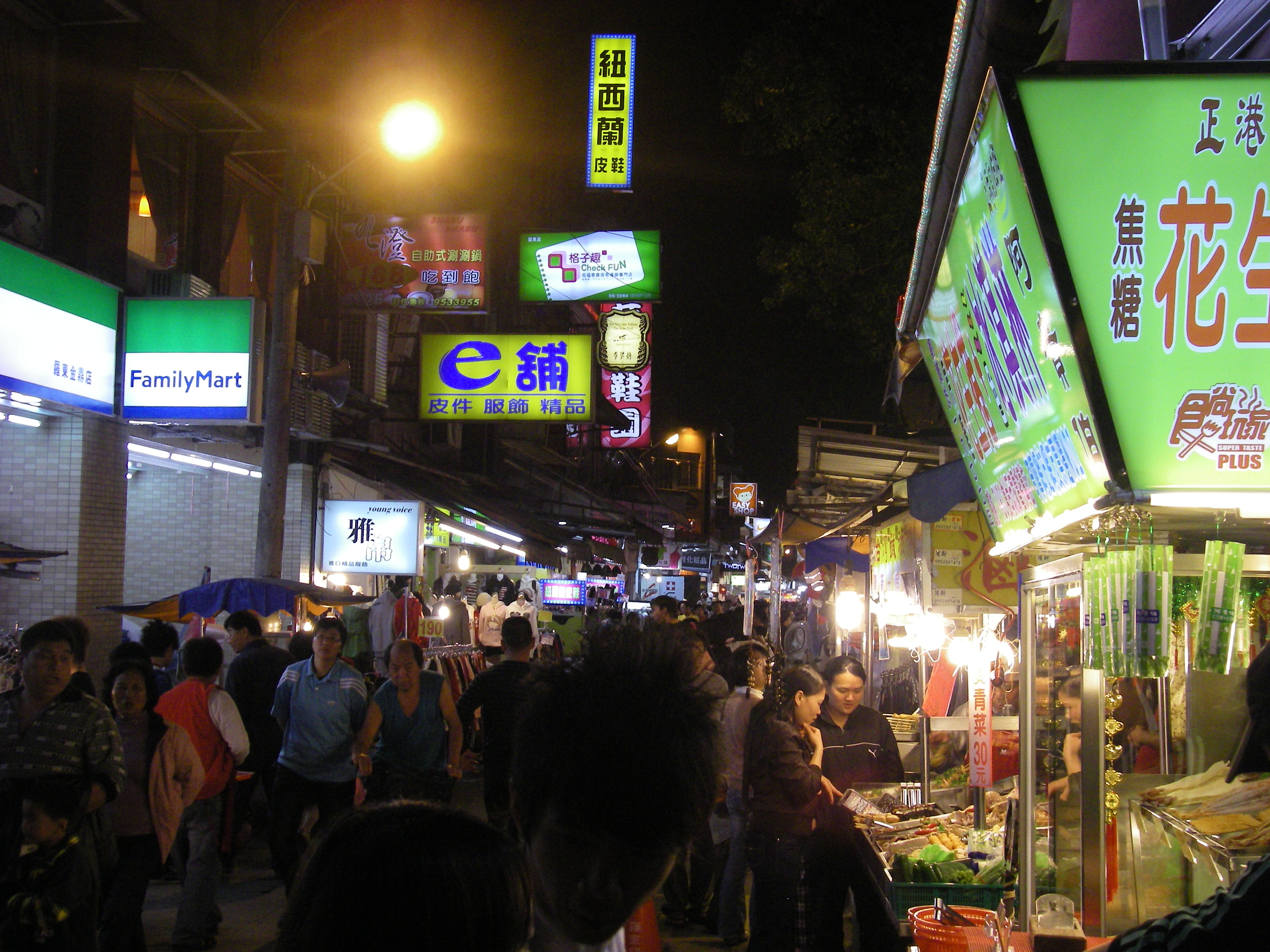
Luodong Night Market

Luodong Night Market is known as one of the busiest night markets and is famous for food. Vendors gather around Yilan's Chung-shan Park and sell goods to the masses.

==== Dongmen Night Market ====
Once a small area, it has grown around the surrounding area to form a key tourist destination. It is located under the Yilan Donggang Bridge along Hemu Road and Shenghou Road.

== See also ==
- Street food
- Taiwanese cuisine
