= Taiwan Sugar Museum =

Taiwan Sugar Museum may refer to:

- Taiwan Sugar Museum (Kaohsiung), Kaohsiung, Taiwan
- Taiwan Sugar Museum (Tainan), Tainan, Taiwan
