= Mikan (cat) =

Cat and station master (born 2020)

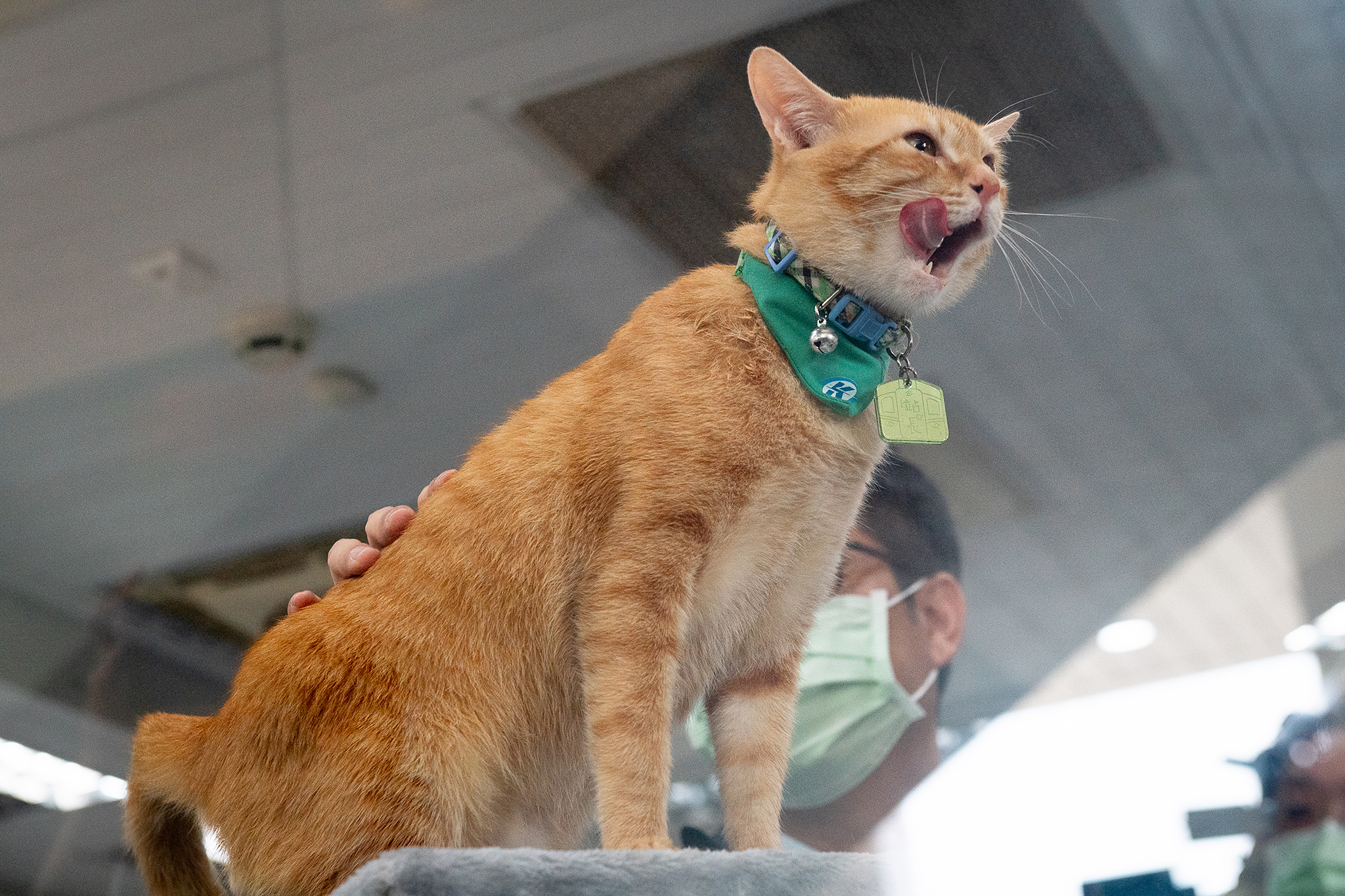
- Mikan in 2021
- Other names: 蜜柑, みかん
- Species: Felis catus
- Sex: Male
- Born: 4 April 2020 (age 6); Kaohsiung
- Occupation: Station master
- Employer: Kaohsiung Metro
- Years active: 2020–present
- Residence: Ciaotou Sugar Refinery metro station
- Appearance: Orange and white fur
- Named after: Japanese name for the Citrus unshiu

Mikan (Chinese: 蜜柑; pinyin: Mìgān; Wade–Giles: Mi^{4}-kan^{1}; born 4 April 2020) is an orange and white cat that serves as the station master of Ciaotou Sugar Refinery metro station, part of the Kaohsiung Metro in Taiwan. Adopted by station staff in 2020, he was appointed station master that September. The metro began to use Mikan for branding purposes, and he quickly became famous, being visited by both the city's mayor Chen Chi-mai and Taiwanese President Tsai Ing-wen. The metro uses Mikan's social media accounts to promote the care of stray animals. Mikan-related merchandise has provided significant income to the metro, both through direct sales and branding agreements in Taiwan and Japan.

Some trains on the Kaohsiung Metro have been decorated with a cartoon depiction of Mikan, and similar depictions have also appeared on a ferry in the city. An inflatable Mikan was created by the city to encourage tourism. The Kaohsiung Metro has used Mikan to promote itself during the Creative Expo Taiwan, named its Christmas fun run after Mikan, and has opened shops dedicated to selling Mikan merchandise. Since Mikan's adoption, several stray cats have also been adopted by other stations within the metro.

== History ==
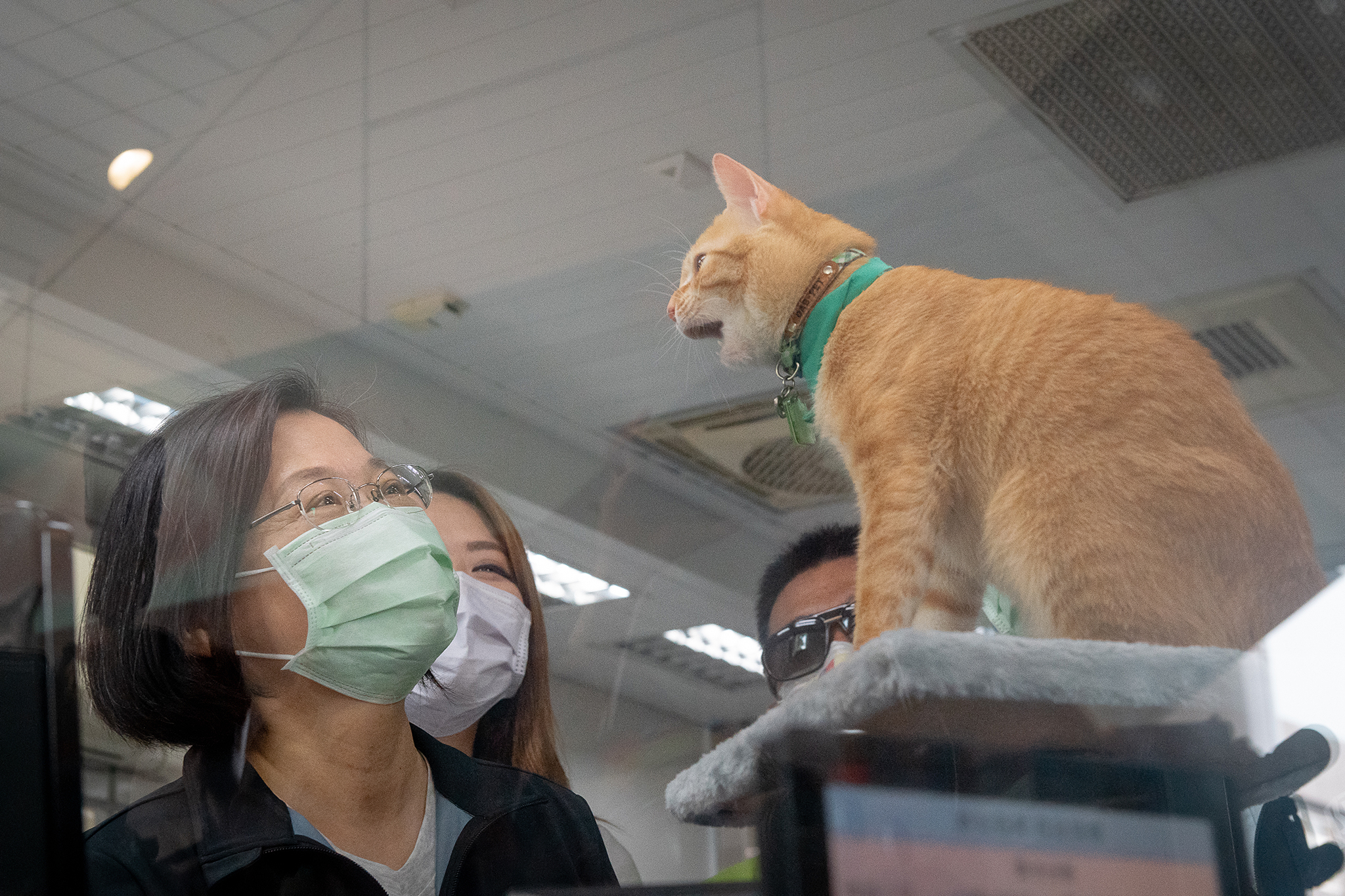
Mikan meeting then–Taiwanese President Tsai Ing-wen in 2021

Mikan is a short-haired cat with orange and white fur. Born a stray on 4 April 2020, he was adopted by staff at the Ciaotou Sugar Refinery metro station of the Kaohsiung Metro, who named him with the Japanese name for the Citrus unshiu (a mandarin orange), due to his resemblance to the fruit while curled up. In September he was officially designated a station master, a move linked to the celebration of the 15th anniversary of the metro's opening. At the time of his appointment, Mikan was reportedly totally unafraid of strangers, and happily allowed photographs while resting in a four-story 'house'.

After becoming station master, Mikan was incorporated into the branding of the station and the wider metro, leading to a rapid growth in fame. He received red envelopes during 2021's Chinese New Year. On 25 February 2021, Kaohsiung Mayor Chen Chi-mai visited the station. Chen, a noted cat lover with two pet cats, sent a postcard of Mikan to Taiwanese President Tsai Ing-wen. That March, Tsai accompanied Chen to the station to visit Mikan. A run of 2,000 commemorative stamp packages with Mikan framing stamps showcasing Kaohsiung were produced in June, and sold in Kaohsiung post offices, with some proceeds going to a local animal charity. In December, the Taiwan Sugar Corporation, which runs the nearby land formerly part of the Ciaotou Sugar Refinery, collaborated with Kaohsiung Metro to decorate its heritage train with Mikan as part of its end of year event. On 14 January 2022, Mikan visited Jiji railway station in Nantou County to celebrate its 100th anniversary. At the event Jiji railway station appointed its own orange cat, Longjiaosun, as a station master. 1,000 commemorative tickets created for the event sold out within an hour.

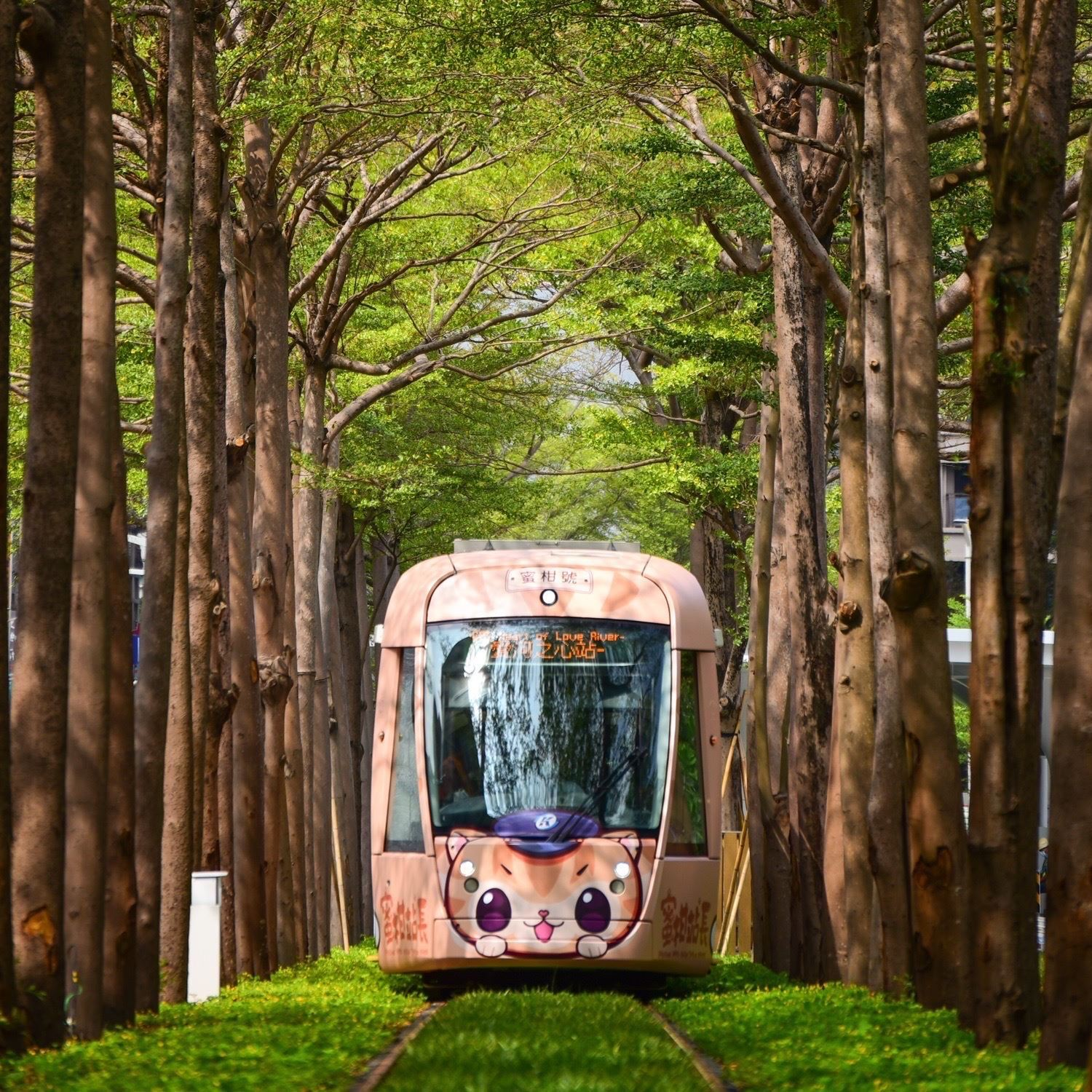
A Kaohsiung Circular light rail train with Mikan-inspired livery traveling through the "green tunnel" section

From 26 March to 31 May 2022, a cat photography exhibit was held at Yanchengpu metro station to mark Mikan's second birthday. A Mikan-themed love train where passengers could write messages to loved ones ran for a few months in 2022, to mark the Qixi Festival. To mark the opening of a new "green tunnel" section of the Circular light rail and the participation of the Kaohsiung Metro in the Creative Expo Taiwan, a train was given a livery that included cartoon representations of Mikan and cats from the Fumeancats YouTube channel. The inside of each carriage had different decorations, including depictions of Mikan. The passage of the cat-themed train through the "green tunnel" was said to resemble a scene from the movie My Neighbor Totoro. Later that year, Kaohsiung Metro held its first Christmas fun run, which was named the "2022 Station Master Mikan Xmas Run", and included a pet category. Exclusive Mikan-themed merchandise was produced to generate interest in the event, with proceeds going to charity.

When Mikan's Facebook page was restricted in 2023, the city government assisted in contacting Facebook about the issue. That year the city government installed a 16-metre (52 ft) inflatable Mikan above Love Pier light rail station, one of three inflatable animals created to draw tourism.

In February 2025, a shop featuring products of both Mikan and Shimanekko was set up during the two-day Taiwan-Japan Dagang Fruit Festival. The same month, Kaohsiung Metro announced a deal with two Japanese railway companies, its previous partner Enoshima Electric Railway as well as Keifuku Electric Railroad. It called this action "Mikan diplomacy". The three companies agreed to jointly produce Mikan-related products and hold promotional activities, with Mikan merchandise being sold at stations along the Japanese railway lines as well as in Kaohsiung. Both Japanese lines would develop Mikan livery for their trains, which were planned for May 2025.

In June 2025, Kaohsiung City Steamship repainted one of its ferries with an image including a cartoon Mikan. On 17 September, the bakery company Yannick launched a Mikan-themed Swiss roll in conjunction with its expansion to the Kaohsiung Metro, and added videos of Mikan to its dispensers throughout Taiwan.

== Impact ==
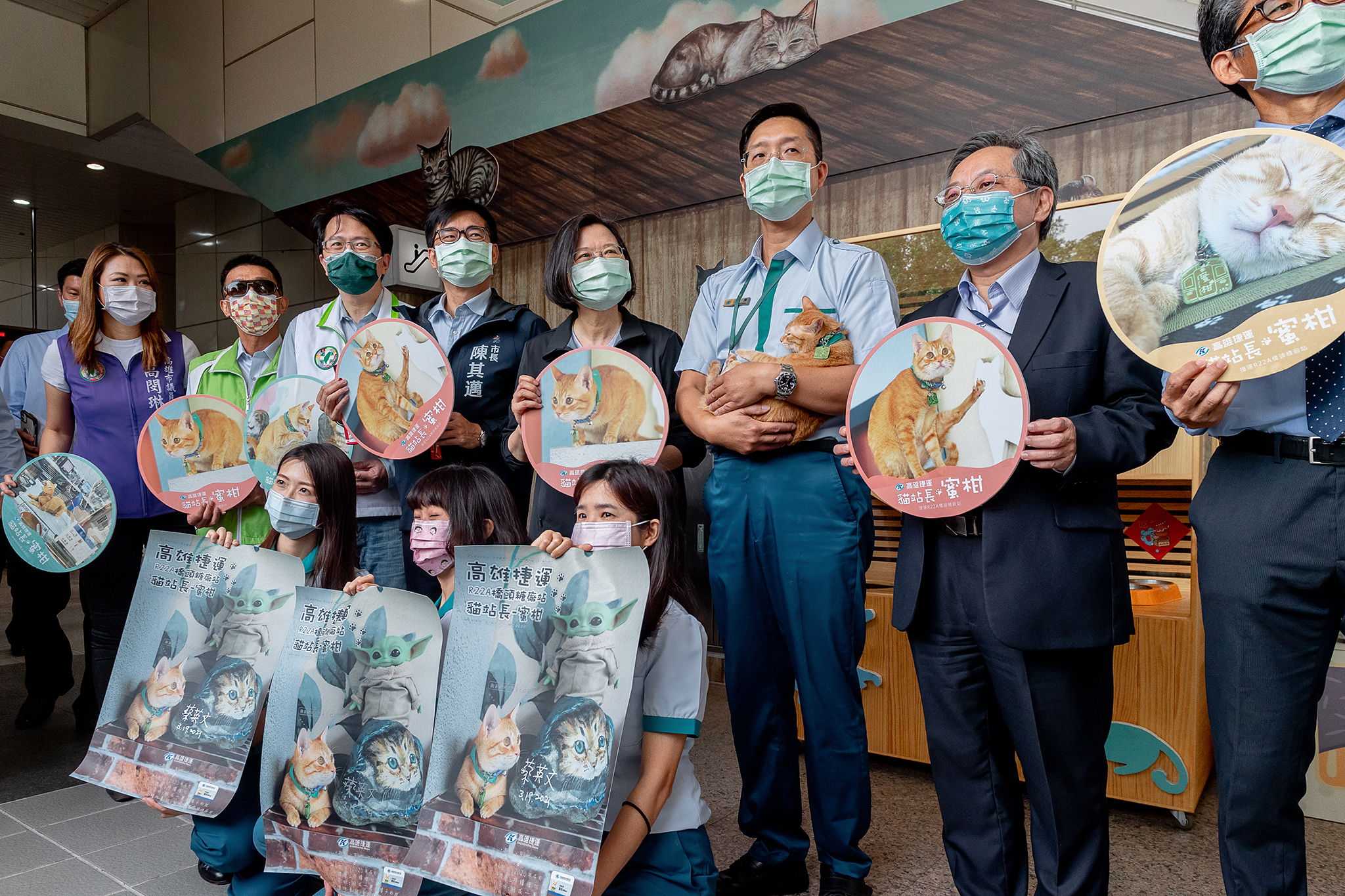
Kaohsiung Mayor Chen Chi-mai and Taiwanese President Tsai Ing-wen, amongst others holding photos of Mikan

In 2020 and 2021, it was reported that Mikan worked at a specially designated location from Wednesday to Sunday, including on national holidays. During cold weather, Mikan is moved into the staff lounge. In 2025 it was reported that he worked just one day a month, spending the rest of his time in "an exclusive workspace overlooking the city". The usual working day is the third Saturday of the month.

The Kaohsiung Metro has embraced Mikan as a marketing and promotional brand, and has created over 120 Mikan-themed products as of 2025. The company operates social media accounts for Mikan, which are used to share updates about Mikan while also encouraging the care of stray animals. It has also represented itself through Mikan at the Creative Expo Taiwan. In 2023 Mikan-related products raised around NT$7.5 million for the metro. In July 2024, a dedicated Mikan shop was opened at Zuoying HSR station, and sales that year reached NT$10 million. In September, an agreement with Enoshima Electric Railway was made to sell Mikan-related products in Japan. A theme song has been developed for Mikan.

Mikan is part of a global trend of giving cats official roles at railway stations. Tama at Kishi Station in Japan is an early example, with later ones including 2021's appointment of George at Stourbridge Junction railway station in the United Kingdom. Other stray cats have subsequently been adopted by Kaohsiung Metro, including three which were given a play area in Zuoying HSR station.

== See also ==
- Think Think and Ah Tsai
