= Longjiaosun =

Cat and station master

- Other name: 龍蕉Sun
- Species: Felis catus
- Born: Probably Mingjian
- Occupation: Station master
- Employer: Jiji Township Office
- Years active: 2022–2023
- Residence: Jiji railway station
- Appearance: Orange fur
- Named after: Dragon fruits, bananas, and the sun

Longjiaosun (龍蕉Sun) is the former cat station master of Jiji railway station in Nantou County, Taiwan. Longjiaosun was adopted from a local animal shelter in November 2021, in preparation for the 100th anniversary of the railway station the following year. That year would also be the year of the Tiger, and Jiji authorities were promoting leopard cat conservation. The cat was named after dragon fruits and bananas, both produced near Jiji, combined with the warmth of the sun. Longjiaosun worked at the station five days a week. On 11 June 2023, Longjiaosun was laid off due to upcoming renovations at the station, and retired to his caretaker's house.

== Installation ==
Jiji railway station in Nantou County, Taiwan, on the Jiji branch line, was built in 1922 to transport construction materials to Sun Moon Lake. After reconstruction in 2001, it began to be used primarily for tourism. In the lead up to its 100th anniversary, the railway station began to search for a cat to adopt as a station master. At the time the town was raising awareness of leopard cat conservation, as well as preparing for the upcoming year of the Tiger. It was felt that a station cat could both promote the care of strays and contribute to the awareness of leopard cats, which are often confused with domestic cats. A reportedly very friendly orange cat was selected from the Nantou Animal Shelter on 19 November 2021. This cat had been caught in Mingjian that October, and turned over to the shelter, which neutered it. The cat was formally adopted by the Jiji Township Office and the owner of a local banana-related tourist site. Public input was requested to find a name. The time between the adoption and the station's centennial would be used to acclimatize the cat to its new surroundings.

On 14 January 2022 the railway station commemorated its centennial, and Longjiaosun was introduced as the new station master. The name Longjiaosun (龍蕉Sun) was created by a five-year-old girl from Shuili, and selected via online voting. It combines parts of the words for dragon fruit (火龍果, huǒlóngguǒ) and banana (香蕉, xiāngjiāo), both grown in the local area, with the warmth of the sun. The event was attended by the Mayor of Jiji, as well as Mikan, the cat station master of Ciaotou Sugar Refinery metro station who travelled north from Kaohsiung for the event. 1,000 commemorative tickets were created for the event, selling out within an hour. Cross-promotion was continued with Mikan over Instagram.

Following the opening, Longjiaosun began working from Thursday to Monday, with two days off each week reportedly to comply with Taiwanese labor laws. Longjiaosun lived in a house nearby, and was picked up and dropped off by a station worker. Reportedly Longjiaosun noticeably gained weight during his first year at the railway station.

== Retirement ==
On 26 May 2023, it was announced via social media that due to upcoming renovations, Longjiaosun would be laid off after 11 June. The renovations would change the purpose of some of the station's spaces, and it was thought it would no longer be suitable for a cat. The township office stated Longjiaosun would temporarily move to the banana tourist site. It also confirmed that the adoptive mother who cared for Longjiaosun during non-work hours would continue this role, and would still update the cat's social media profiles.
