= Xiaogang Linyuan Line =

Railway line in Kaohsiung, Taiwan

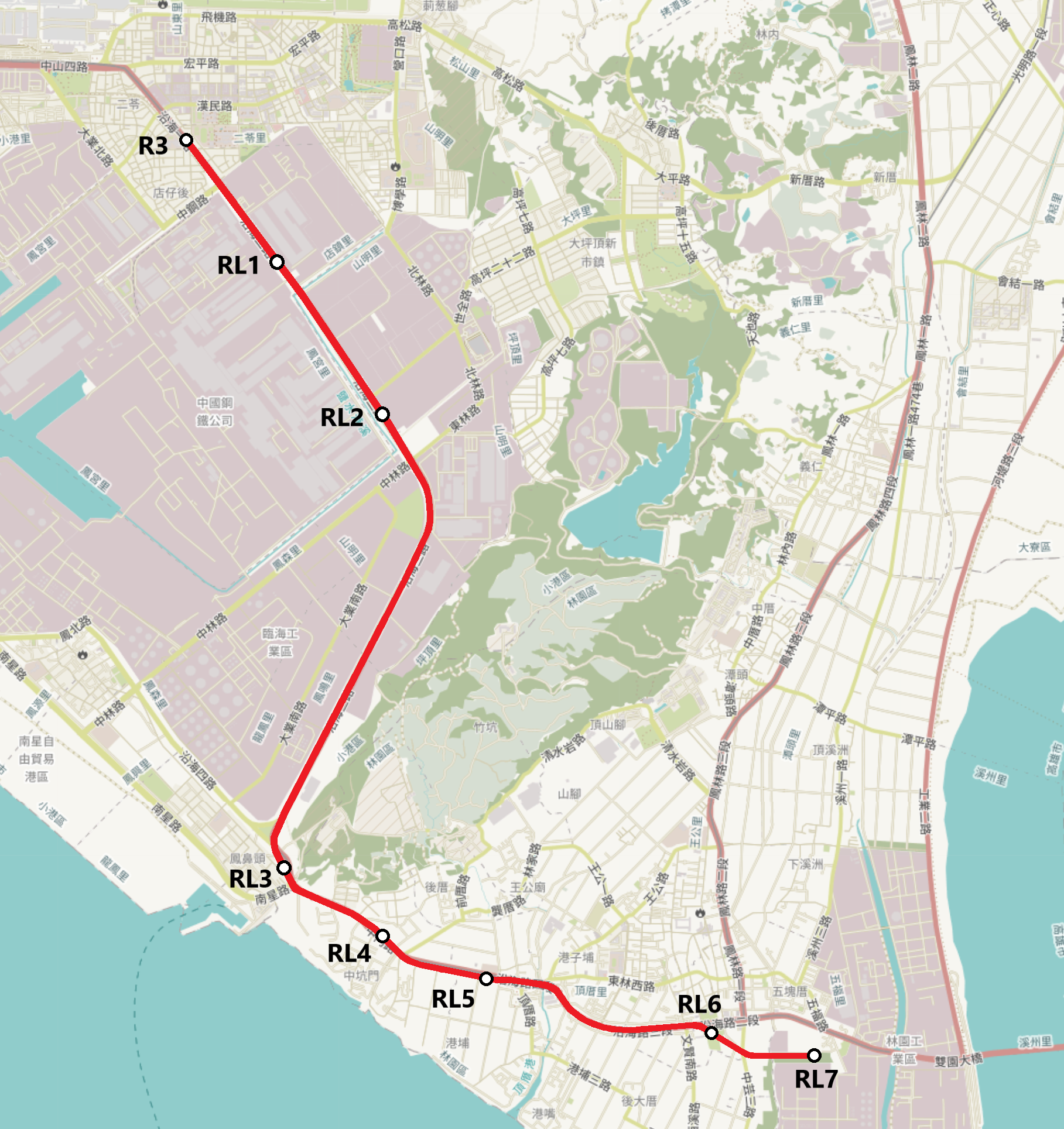

Overview
- Status: Under construction
- Locale: Kaohsiung, Taiwan
- Termini: Siaogang; Linyuan Industrial Park
- Continues as: Red line
- Stations: 7

Service
- Type: Urban rail transit

History
- Opened: Expected 2034

Technical
- Line length: 11.59 km (7.20 mi)
- Character: Underground and elevated
- Track gauge: 1,435 mm (4 ft 8 1/2 in)

Siaogang Linyuan Line is an extension of Kaohsiung Metro's Red line. It is now under construction and is expected to open in 2034. The line is 11.59 kilometers long, starting at Siaogang metro station and terminating at the Linyuan Industrial Park. It will have 6 underground stations and 1 elevated station at a cost of NT$53.3 billion.

== History ==
In 1991 the Executive Yuan agreed to commence the feasibility study on the proposed Red line section from Ciaotou station to the Linhai Industrial Park. The alignment of the Red line, which would connect Hsinyuan Extension that runs from Linhai to Sinyuan, Pingtung via Linyuan of Kaohsiung, was revised in 1993 such that it would end at Siaogang, where Linhai falls into the long-term planning. Another study conducted between 1998 and 2001 finds that the proposed Dapeng Bay Extension, which will run elevated from Siaogang to Dapeng Bay in Pingtung with through service to Red line, would not be cost effective.

Based on the study for Dapeng Bay Extension, the Kaohsiung authorities in early 2000s considered constructing a light rail transit system to connect Siaogang and Yanhai Road. However, the assessment concluded that the system would not be financially sustainable, and the plan, now renamed Linyuan Extension, was halted again. Local government then in 2012 mulled bus rapid transit system, starting at Siaogang and ending at Fengbitou, as the substitution. Meanwhile, a consultancy study initiated by the government in the 2010s proposed Siaoggang Linyuan Extension and Linyuan Donggang Extension. The proposal is still unable to generate financial sustainability and was not prioritised.

In 2018, Kaohsiung authorities submitted the Red line extension proposal to Taipei government, suggesting that the project should be approval on special condition due to Linyuan's significant contribution to the economy even though the extension may not generate revenue. Kaohsiung government also discussed with Pingtung counterpart on the type and alignment of the line, and eventually agreed on providing an high-capacity system with most of them underground and lifting aboveground near the terminus, such that the Pingtung section could be built aboveground in the future and provide through service direct to Kaohsiung City.

The feasibility study was endorsed by the Executive Yuan in 2021. The final alignment was approved by the Executive Yuan in 2022. Works began in November 2023, and the extension is expected to open in 2034, at a cost of 53.3 billion, of which the government will subsidise $31.3 billion.

== Alignment ==
The line would extend from the original terminus of Siaoggang station, and travel southwards underground along Provincial Highway 17, with stops in Linhai Industrial Park, Fengbitou, Linyuan, and Linyuan Industrial Park Management Office. It will connect Linyuan Donggang Line at Linyuan Industrial Zone, running east to cross the county border and extending into Donggang and Dapeng Bay of Pingtung.

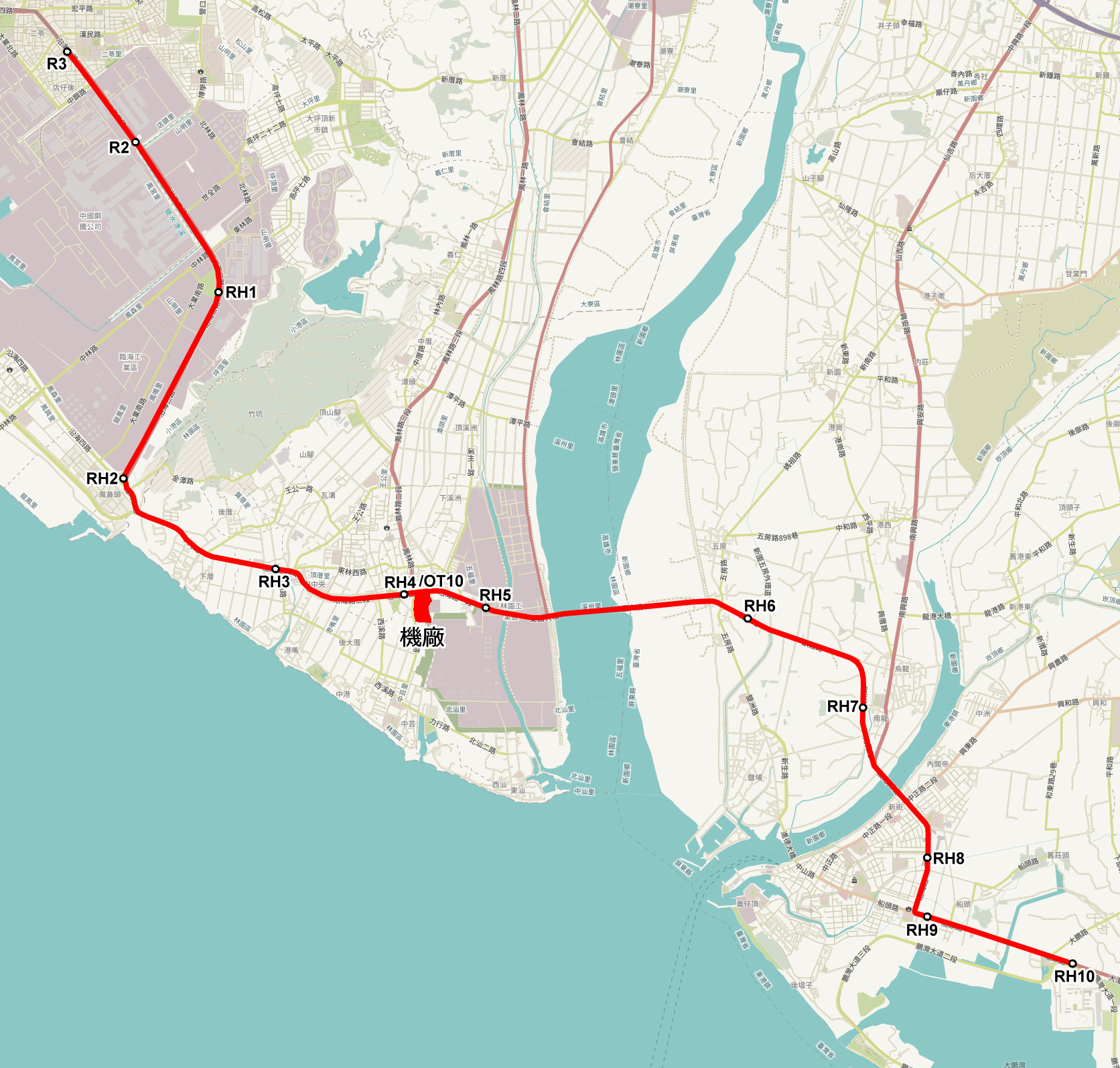
2005 version, as Linyuan Extension

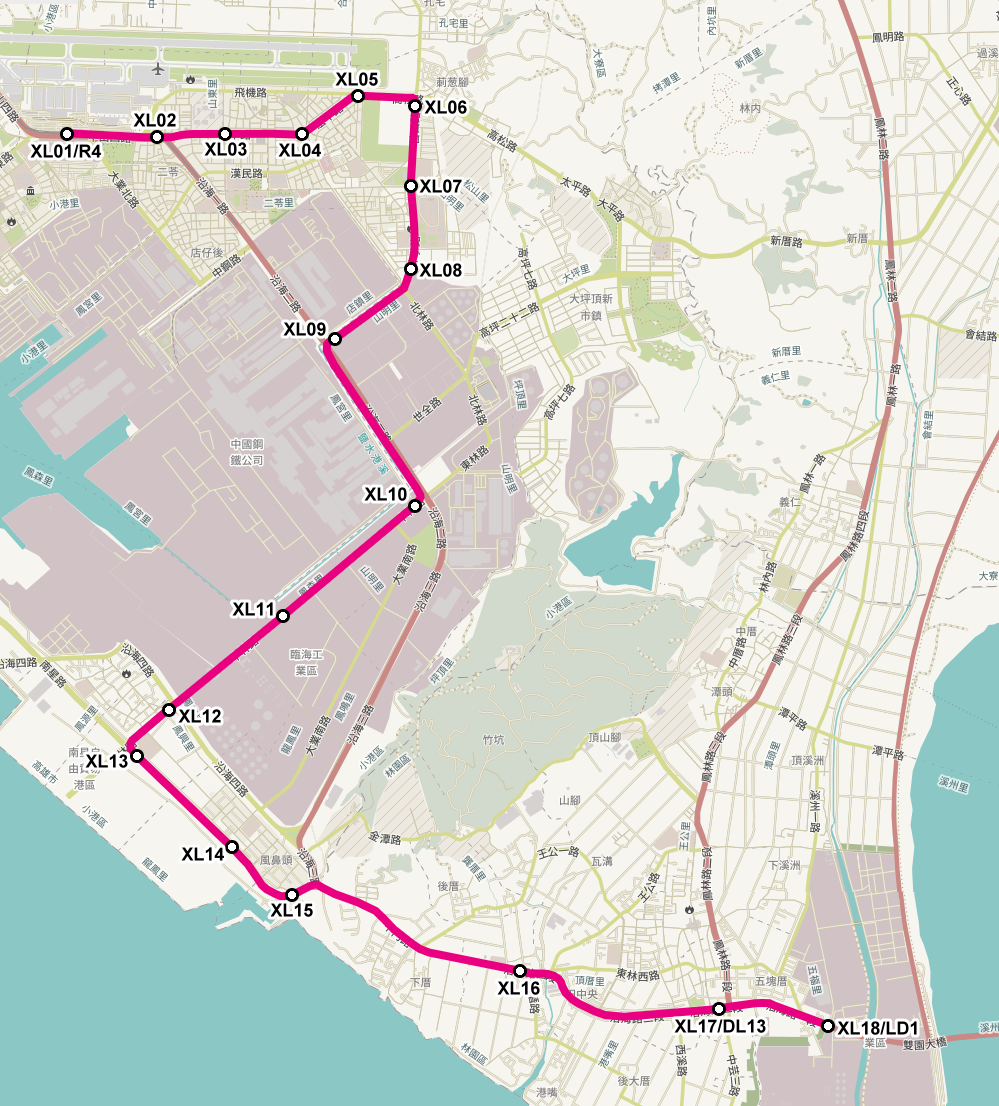
2014 version, as Siaogang Linyuan Line

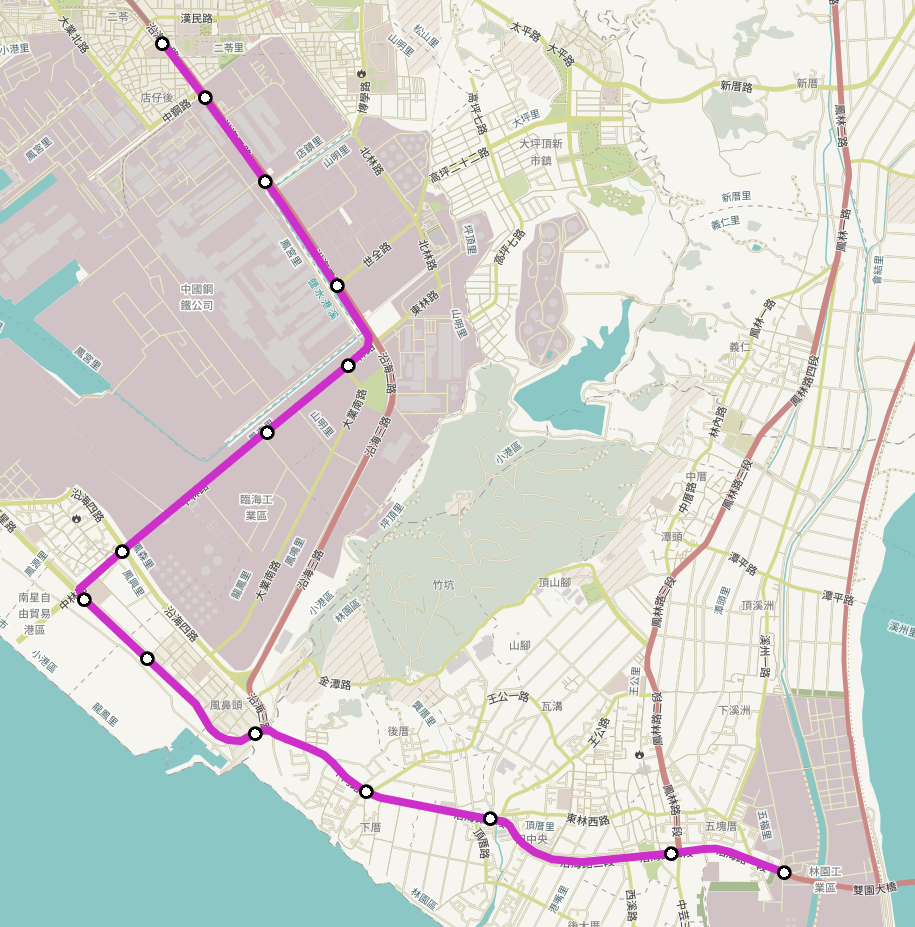
2017 version, as one of the proposed alignments of Siaogang Linyuan Line

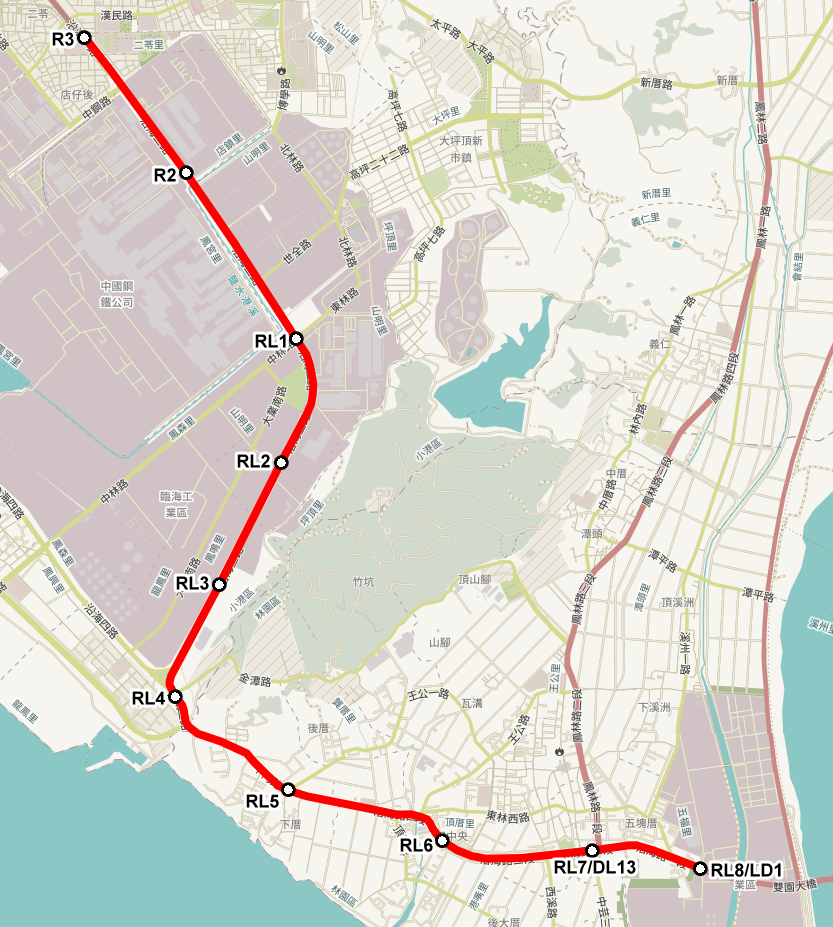
2018 version, as Siaogang Linyuan Line

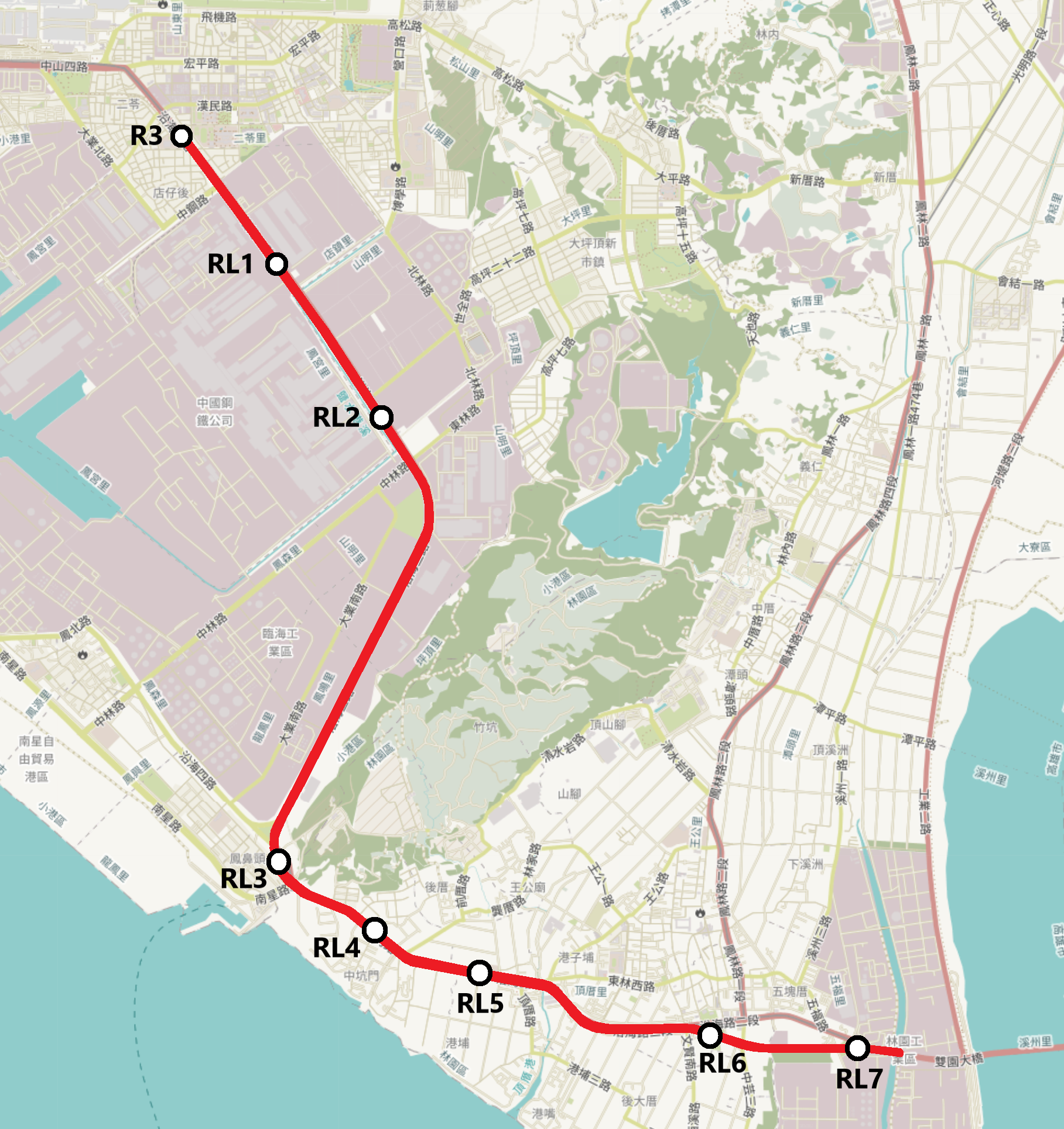
2021 finalised version

== Station ==
The station names are tentative only and not confirmed.

Code	Station name		Section	Transfer	Location	
Code	English	Chinese	Section	Transfer	Location	
R3	Siaogang	小港	Main		Siaogang	Kaohsiung
↓ Siaogang Linyuan Line ↓
RL1	China Steel East Portal	中鋼東門	Main/Siaogang-Donggang		Siaogang	Kaohsiung
RL2	Linhai Industrial Park	臨海工業區	Siaogang-Donggang		Siaogang	Kaohsiung
RL3	Fongbitou	鳳鼻頭	Siaogang-Donggang		Siaogang	Kaohsiung
RL4	Jhongkengmen	中坑門	Siaogang-Donggang		Linyuan	Kaohsiung
RL5	Gangzihpu	港子埔	Siaogang-Donggang		Linyuan	Kaohsiung
RL6	Linyuan	林園	Siaogang-Donggang		Linyuan	Kaohsiung
RL7	Linyuan Industrial Park	林園工業區	Siaogang-Donggang		Linyuan	Kaohsiung
