= Red line (Kaohsiung Metro) =

Metro line in Kaohsiung, Taiwan

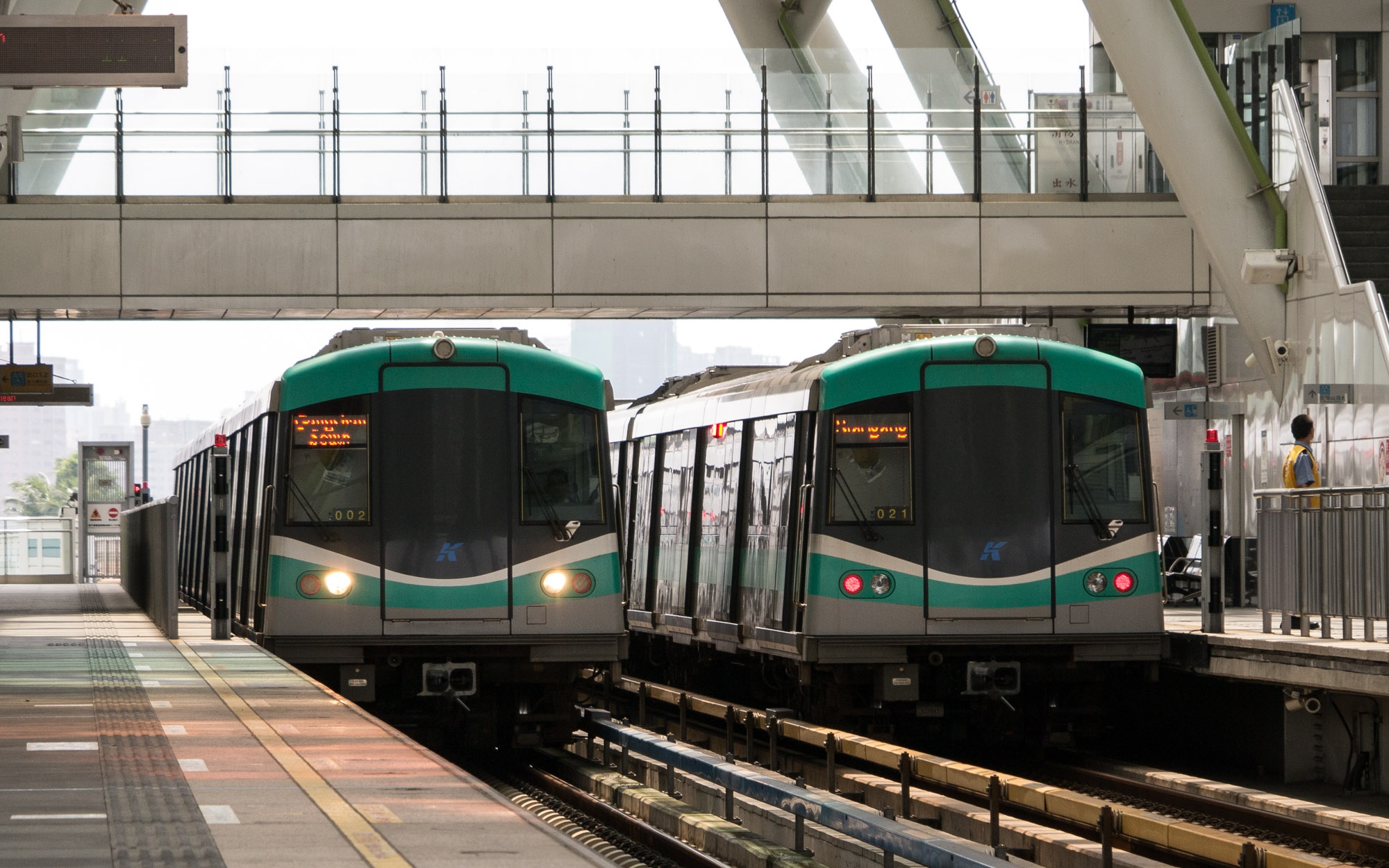
- Red line train at World Games station

Overview
- Native name: 紅線
- Status: In service
- Owner: Kaohsiung DORTS
- Line number: R
- Locale: Kaohsiung, Taiwan
- Termini: Gangshan; Siaogang
- Stations: 25
- Color on map: Red

Service
- Type: Rapid transit; airport rail link
- System: Kaohsiung Metro
- Operator: Kaohsiung Rapid Transit Corporation
- Depot(s): North; South
- Rolling stock: Siemens EMU

History
- Opened: 9 March 2008; 18 years ago
- Last extension: June 30, 2024

Technical
- Line length: 31.1 km (19.3 mi)
- Num of tracks: 2
- Character: Underground/at-grade/elevated
- Track gauge: 1,435 mm (4 ft 8 1/2 in) standard gauge
- Electrification: 750 V DC third rail

Red line
- Traditional Chinese: 紅線
- Simplified Chinese: 红线
Transcriptions
Standard Mandarin
- Hanyu Pinyin: Hóng-Xiàn
- Wade–Giles: Hung^{2}- Hsien^{4}
- Tongyong Pinyin: Hóng-Siàn
Southern Min
- Hokkien POJ: Âng-Soàⁿ

The Red line (Chinese: 紅線) is a metro line of Kaohsiung Metro which runs north–south through the city of Kaohsiung, Taiwan. At 31 kilometres (19 mi), it is the fourth-longest metro line in Taiwan, after Taoyuan Airport MRT, Tamsui-Xinyi line and Zhonghe-Xinlu line.

There is a plan to extend the line north to Hunei District. This would add eight stations to the line, and also a plan to extend the line south to Linyuan through the Siaogang Linyuan Line and to Donggang. This would add 12 stations to the line.

== History ==
In the 1988 Kaohsiung Metropolitan Metro System Feasibility Study, the Red line was amongst the four lines planned. In January 1991, it was one of the two lines categorised to open as Phase 1 in period 1. Progress was halted in March 1995, due to the city council's skepticism for the need of it, citing traffic congestion within the city to be not critical. In June 1998, the executive board revived the plans under the BOT initiative. Together with the approval from relevant city councils, the metro department began conducting feasibility studies of the Red line in February 1999. Three months later, priority was given to China Steel Corporation and Siemens on construction contracts. The contracts were finalised in January 2000.

On 24 October 2001, ground works were initiated at the Siaogang station site. The first phase from Siaogang station to Sanduo Shopping District station had its machinery and tunneling works completed in November 2006. Test riders were invited for operational trial for this milestone. By February 2008, most of the construction had been completed. At this stage, a soft opening was launched, with free rides in the first phase. The entire line from Siaogang to Ciaotou stations opened on 9 March 2008, and was free to commuters until 7 April the same year. (Note: Formosa Boulevard station opened at a later date.)

The line opened for service on 9 March 2008 and was free for one month, until 6 April.

The new EMUs for the six expanded stations will be manufactured by South Korea's Hyundai Rotem and Singapore's ST Engineering.

== Stations ==
Code	Station name		Section	Transfer	Location	
Code	English	Chinese	Section	Transfer	Location	
RK8	Dahu	大湖	Gangshan-Luzhu		Hunei	Kaohsiung
RK7	Luzhu	路竹	Gangshan-Luzhu		Luzhu	Kaohsiung
RK6	Luzhu South	南路竹	Gangshan-Luzhu		Luzhu	Kaohsiung
RK5	Taiwan Steel University of Science and Technology	台鋼科技大學	Gangshan-Luzhu		Luzhu	Kaohsiung
RK4	Kaohsiung Science Park	高雄科學園區	Gangshan-Luzhu		Luzhu	Kaohsiung
RK3	Benjhou Industrial Park	本洲產業園區	Gangshan-Luzhu		Gangshan	Kaohsiung
RK2	Kangshan; Agricultural & Industrial; Vocational Senior High School	岡山農工	Gangshan-Luzhu		Gangshan	Kaohsiung
RK1	Gangshan Station	岡山車站	Main/Gangshan-Luzhu	Gangshan	Gangshan	Kaohsiung
R24	Kaohsiung Medical University Gangshan Hospital	岡山高醫	Main		Gangshan	Kaohsiung
R23	Ciaotou Station	橋頭火車站	Main	Qiaotou	Ciaotou	Kaohsiung
R22A	Ciaotou Sugar Refinery	橋頭糖廠	Main		Ciaotou	Kaohsiung
R22	Cingpu (NKFUST)^{[A]}	青埔 (高科大)	Main		Ciaotou	Kaohsiung
R21	Metropolitan Park	都會公園	Main		Nanzih	Kaohsiung
R20	Houjing (NKMU) ^{[B]}	後勁 (海科大)	Main		Nanzih	Kaohsiung
R19	Nanzih Technology Industrial Park	楠梓科技園區	Main		Nanzih	Kaohsiung
R18	Oil Refinery Elementary School	油廠國小	Main		Nanzih	Kaohsiung
R17	World Games/ National Sports Complex	世運／ 國家體育園區	Main		Nanzih	Kaohsiung
R16	Zuoying/THSR	左營／高鐵	Main	Xinzuoying (ZUY/12)	Zuoying	Kaohsiung
R15	Ecological District	生態園區	Main		Zuoying	Kaohsiung
R14	Kaohsiung Arena (Sanmin Household & Commercial High School)	巨蛋 (三民家商)	Main		Zuoying; Gushan	Kaohsiung
R13	Aozihdi	凹子底	Main	via Heart of Love River	Zuoying; Gushan	Kaohsiung
R12	Houyi	後驛	Main		Sanmin	Kaohsiung
R11	Kaohsiung Main Station	高雄車站	Main	Kaohsiung	Sanmin	Kaohsiung
R10	Formosa Boulevard	美麗島	Main	O5	Sinsing	Kaohsiung
R9	Central Park	中央公園	Main		Sinsing; Lingya	Kaohsiung
R8	Sanduo Shopping District	三多商圈	Main		Lingya; Cianjhen	Kaohsiung
R7	Shihjia (Labor Park)	獅甲 (勞工公園)	Main		Cianjhen	Kaohsiung
R6	Kaisyuan	凱旋	Main	via Cianjhen Star	Cianjhen	Kaohsiung
R5	Cianjhen Senior High School (Wujia)	前鎮高中 (五甲)	Main		Cianjhen	Kaohsiung
R4A	Caoya (KRTC)^{[C]}	草衙 (高雄捷運公司)	Main		Cianjhen	Kaohsiung
R4	Kaohsiung International Airport	高雄國際機場	Main	KHH	Siaogang	Kaohsiung
R3	Siaogang	小港	Main		Siaogang	Kaohsiung
RL1	China Steel East Portal	中鋼東門	Main/Siaogang-Donggang		Siaogang	Kaohsiung
RL2	Linhai Industrial Park	臨海工業區	Siaogang-Donggang		Siaogang	Kaohsiung
RL3	Fongbitou	鳳鼻頭	Siaogang-Donggang		Siaogang	Kaohsiung
RL4	Jhongkengmen	中坑門	Siaogang-Donggang		Linyuan	Kaohsiung
RL5	Gangzihpu	港子埔	Siaogang-Donggang		Linyuan	Kaohsiung
RL6	Linyuan	林園	Siaogang-Donggang		Linyuan	Kaohsiung
RL7	Linyuan Industrial Park	林園工業區	Siaogang-Donggang		Linyuan	Kaohsiung
RD1	Wufang	五房	Siaogang-Donggang		Sinyuan	Pingtung; County
RD2	Wulong	烏龍	Siaogang-Donggang		Sinyuan	Pingtung; County
RD3	Donggang	東港	Siaogang-Donggang		Donggang	Pingtung; County
RD4	Dapengwan National Scenic; District Management Hall	鵬管處	Siaogang-Donggang		Donggang	Pingtung; County
RD5	Dapengwan Bay	大鵬灣	Siaogang-Donggang		Donggang	Pingtung; County

Notes

- A The full name is National Kaohsiung First University of Science and Technology.
- B The full name is National Kaohsiung Marine University.
- C The full name is Kaohsiung Rapid Transit Corporation.
