= Cingpu metro station =

Metro station in Kaohsiung, Taiwan

Cingpu R22 青埔
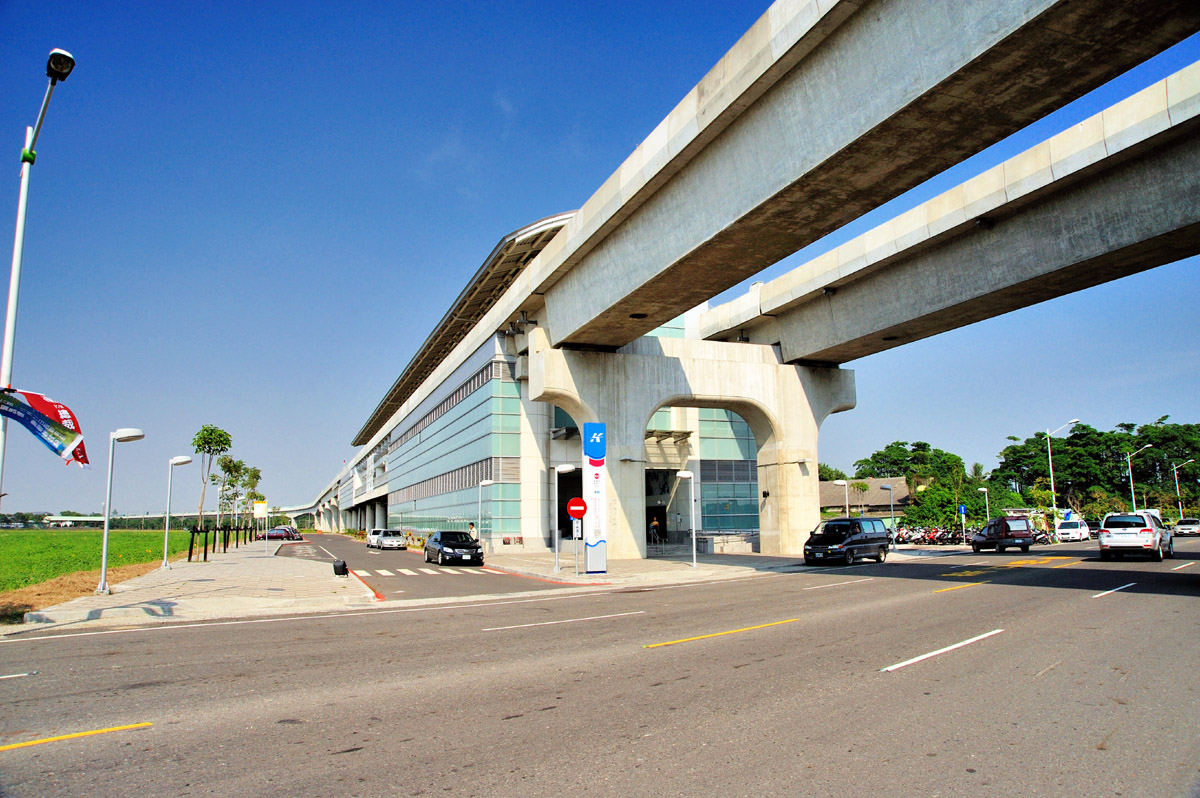
- Cingpu station Building

Chinese name
- Chinese: 青埔站
Transcriptions
Standard Mandarin
- Hanyu Pinyin: Qīngpǔ Zhàn
- Bopomofo: ㄑㄧㄥ ㄆㄨˇ ㄓㄢˋ
- Wade–Giles: Ch'ing^{1}p'u^{3} Chan^{4}
- Tongyong Pinyin: Cīngpǔ Jhàn

General information
- Other names: NKFUST; 高科大
- Location: Ciaotou, Kaohsiung; Taiwan
- Coordinates: 22°44′42″N 120°19′03″E
- Operated by: Kaohsiung Rapid Transit Corporation
- Line: Red line (R22)
- Platforms: 1 island platform

Construction
- Structure type: Elevated

History
- Opened: 2008-03-09

Passengers
- 1,482 daily (Jan. 2011)

Services
Preceding station	Kaohsiung Metro	Following station
Ciaotou Sugar Refinery towards Gangshan	Red line	Metropolitan Park towards Siaogang
Location

Cingpu is a station on the Red line of Kaohsiung MRT in Ciaotou District, Kaohsiung City, Taiwan.

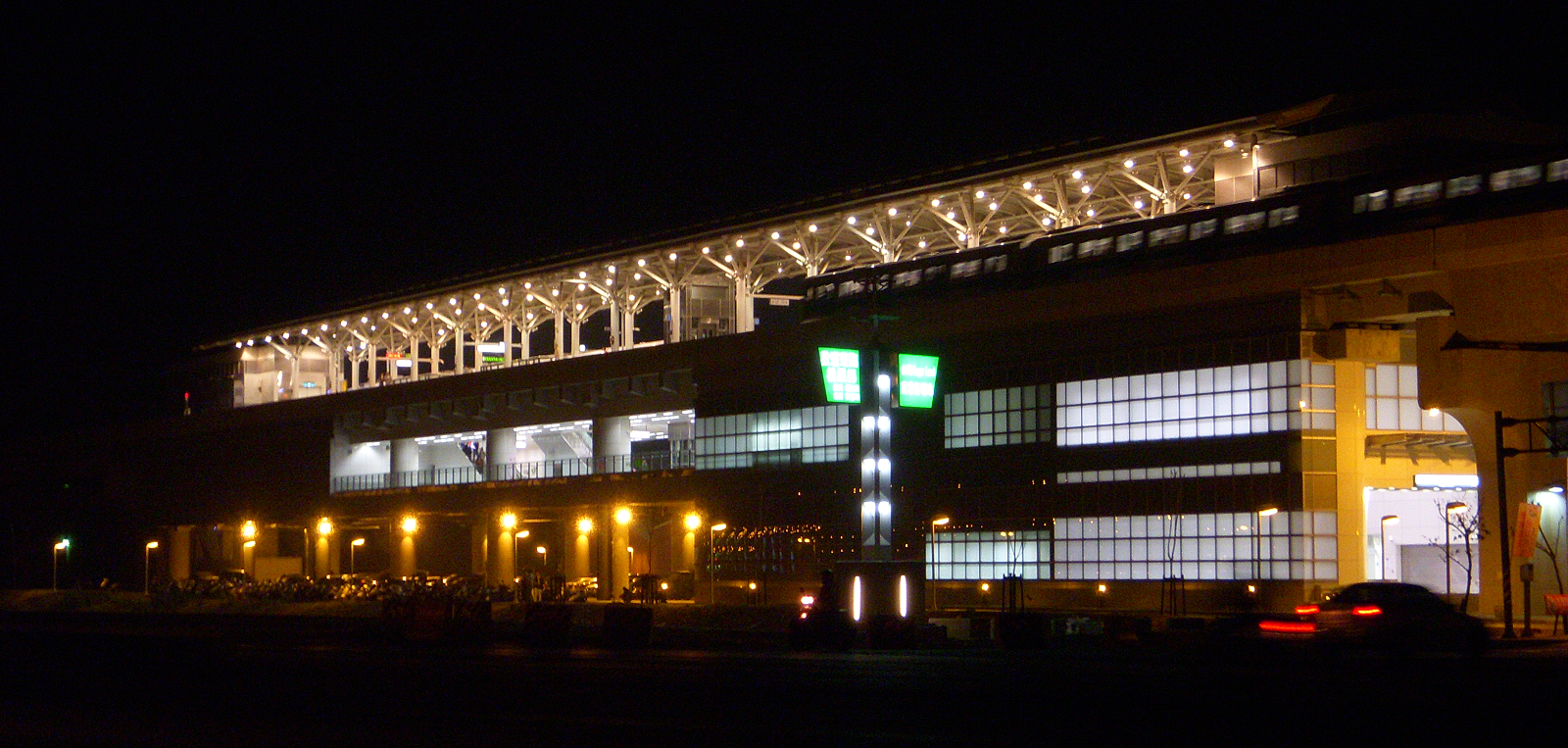
Cingpu station at night

This is a three-level, elevated station with one island platform and one exit. It is 154 meters long and is located near the CPC Ciaotou Oil Depot.

== Around the station ==
- National Kaohsiung First University of Science and Technology, about three kilometers away
- Taiwan Sugar Corporation Cingpu Farm
- Taiwan Sugar Corporation Ranch
- Gaonan Highway
