= World Games metro station =

Metro station in Kaohsiung, Taiwan

World Games/ National Sports Complex R17 世運 / 國家體育園區
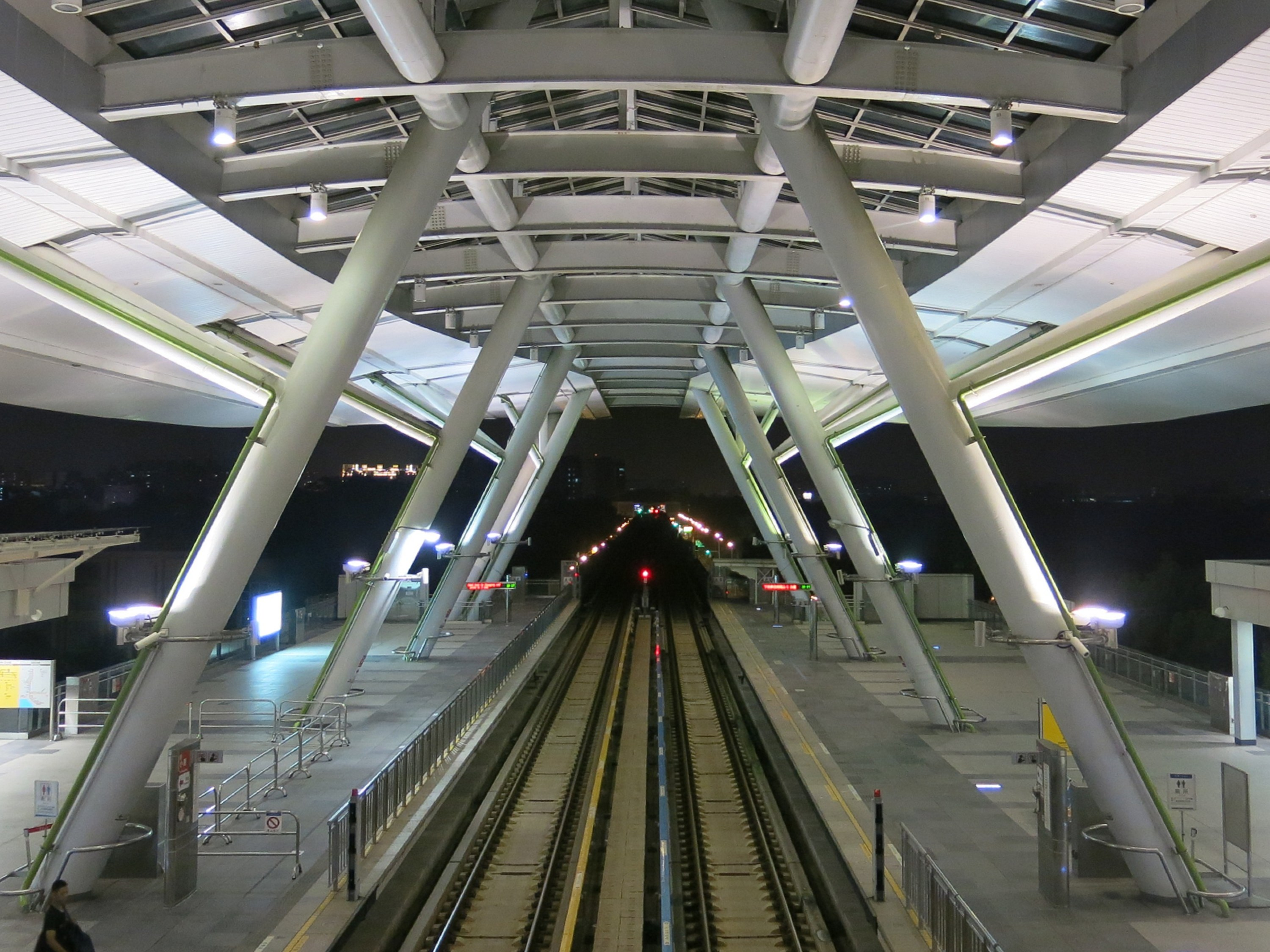
- World Games station

Chinese name
- Traditional Chinese: 世運車站
- Simplified Chinese: 世运车站
Transcriptions
Standard Mandarin
- Hanyu Pinyin: Shìyùn Chēzhàn
- Bopomofo: ㄕˋ ㄩㄣˋ ㄔㄜ ㄓㄢˋ
- Wade–Giles: Shih^{4}-yun^{4} Ch'ê^{1}-chan^{4}

General information
- Location: Nanzih, Kaohsiung; Taiwan
- Coordinates: 22°42′5.5″N 120°18′9.2″E
- Operated by: Kaohsiung Rapid Transit Corporation
- Line: Red line (R17)
- Platforms: 2 side platforms

Construction
- Structure type: Elevated

History
- Opened: 2008-03-09

Passengers
- 2,464 daily (Jan. 2011)

Services
Preceding station	Kaohsiung Metro	Following station
Oil Refinery Elementary School towards Gangshan	Red line	Zuoying towards Siaogang
Location

World Games is a station on the Red line of Kaohsiung Metro in Nanzih District, Kaohsiung, Taiwan. The station is named after the 2009 World Games.

== Station overview ==
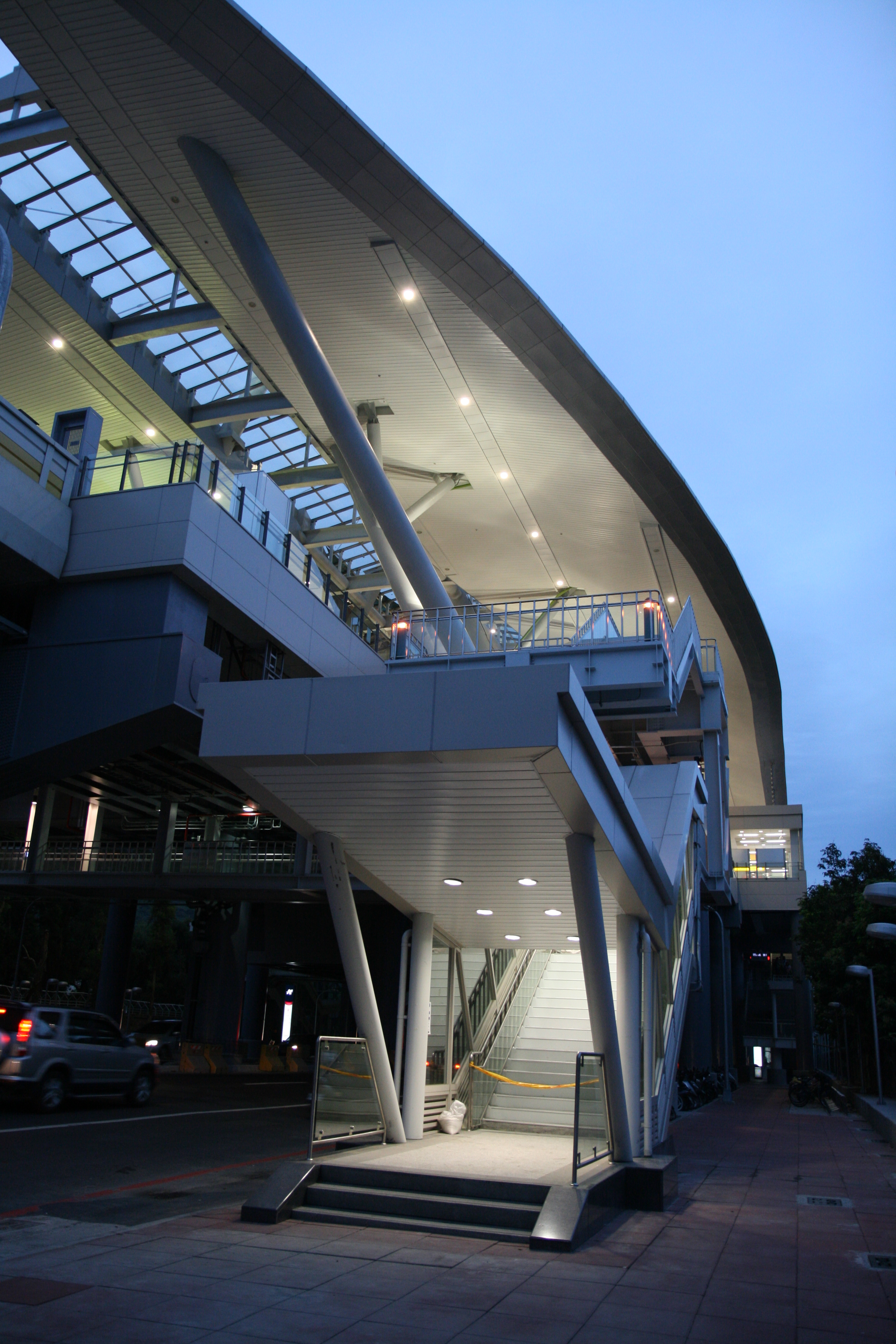
World Games station exit

This is a four-level, elevated station with two side platforms and four exits. It is 134 meters long and is located at the intersection of Zuonan Rd. and Jhonghai Rd.

It was originally planned to be named "Banping Mountain station", but this was changed in July 2005 to its current name. Because it is the first elevated station after the line emerges from underground, the aim was to create an iconic station similar to the Taipei Metro's Jiantan metro station.

=== Public art ===
Public art in the station was designed by Ron Wood and Christian Karl Janssen. Titled "Floating Forest", the artwork covers an area of 1,000 m^{2} (11,000 ft^{2}) and is displayed on the glass canopy overlooking the tracks, at the concourse level, and along the stairways. The artwork depicts many plants and insects, and tells the story of "Soul of the Land and the People in Southern Taiwan".

== Around the station ==
- National Sports Training Center
- National Stadium
- Republic of China Naval Academy
- Banping Mountain
- CPC Corporation Kaohsiung Plant
- Zuoying High School
