= Ciaotou station =

Station in Qiaotou, Kaohsiung, Taiwan

Ciaotou Qiaotou 橋頭
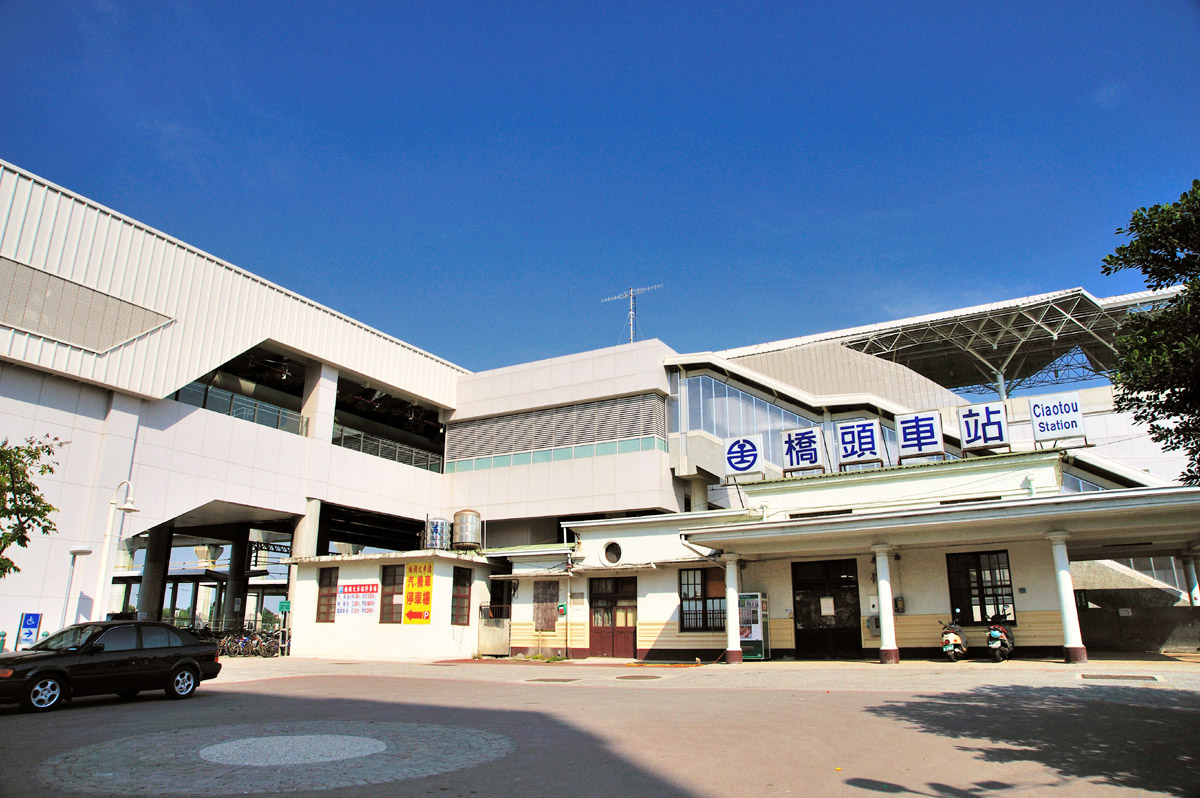

Chinese name
- Traditional Chinese: 橋頭火車站
- Simplified Chinese: 桥头火车站
Transcriptions
Standard Mandarin
- Hanyu Pinyin: Qiaótóu Huǒchēzhàn
- Bopomofo: ㄑㄧㄠˊ ㄊㄡˊ ㄏㄨㄛˇ ㄔㄜ ㄓㄢˋ
- Wade–Giles: Ciao^{2}tou^{2} Huo^{3}ch'ê^{1}chan^{4}
- Tongyong Pinyin: Ciáotóu Huǒchejhàn

Alternative Chinese name
- Traditional Chinese: 橋頭車站
- Simplified Chinese: 桥头车站
Transcriptions
Standard Mandarin
- Hanyu Pinyin: Qiaótóu Chēzhàn
- Bopomofo: ㄑㄧㄠˊ ㄊㄡˊ ㄔㄜ ㄓㄢˋ
- Wade–Giles: Ciao^{2}tou^{2} Ch'ê^{1}chan^{4}
- Tongyong Pinyin: Ciáotóu Chejhàn

General information
- Location: Ciaotou, Kaohsiung, Taiwan
- Coordinates: 22°45′38″N 120°18′38″E
- Operated by: Taiwan Railway Corporation; Kaohsiung Rapid Transit Corporation
- Lines: West Coast line (181); Red line (R23)
- Distance: 382.0 km from Keelung
- Platforms: 2 island platforms 1 side platform
- Connections: Bus stop

Construction
- Structure type: Elevated/at-grade
- Accessible: Yes

Other information
- Classification: 三等站 (Taiwan Railway level)

History
- Opened: 1901-05-15

Key dates
- 2008-03-09: Metro added

Passengers
- MRT: 6,490 daily (Jan. 2011)

Services
Preceding station	Taiwan Railway	Following station
Gangshan towards Keelung	Western Trunk line	Nanzi towards Pingtung
Preceding station	Kaohsiung Metro	Following station
Kaohsiung Medical University Gangshan Hospital towards Gangshan	Red line	Ciaotou Sugar Refinery towards Siaogang
Location

Ciaotou (Chinese: 橋頭; Hanyu Pinyin: Qiáotóu; Tongyong Pinyin: Ciáotóu) is a railway and metro station in Kaohsiung, Taiwan served by the Taiwan Railway (TR) and Kaohsiung MRT; it can also be transliterated as Qiaotou Station.

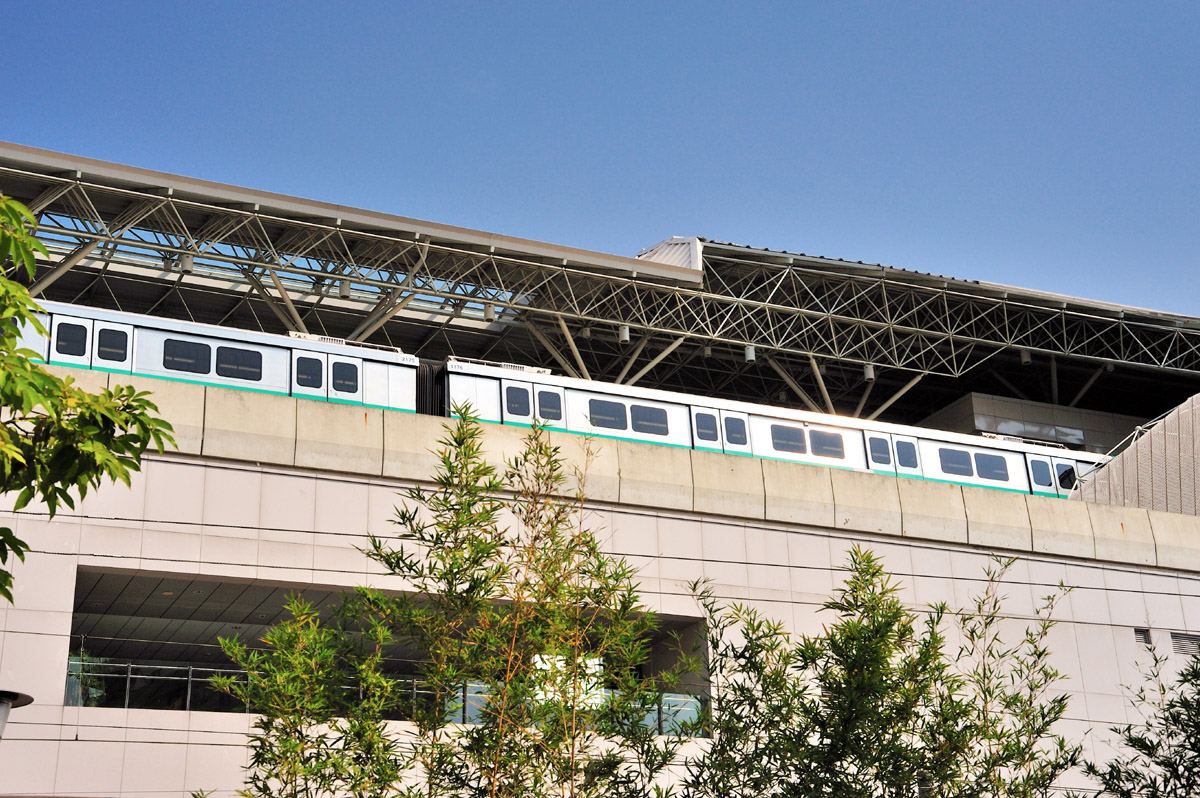
A Kaohsiung MRT train at the platform

This three-level station serves the Taiwan Railway and Kaohsiung MRT. TR services operate at ground-level platforms, while KMRT services operate on an elevated platform. The KMRT station is elevated with an island platform. It is located on Zhanqian St. and has two exits. The station is 185 meters long. The station formerly had a frieght yard and a interchange with Taiwan Sugar Railways.

== History ==
=== TR station ===
- 1901-05-15: Opened for service.

=== KMRT station ===
- 2008-03-09: Red Line between Ciaotou and Siaogang opened.

== Around the station ==
- Qiaotou Township Office
- Taiwan Sugar Kaohsiung Factory
- Qiaotou Junior High School
  - Qiaotou Junior High School Swimming Pool
- Qiaotou Elementary School
- Qiaotou Old Street
- Station Front Retail Building
- Hongren Hospital
- Taiwan Power Company Service Office
- Taiwan Sugar Museum (Kaohsiung)

== See also ==
- List of railway stations in Taiwan
