= Zuoying HSR station =

Railway station in Zuoying, Kaohsiung, Taiwan

Zuoying–Xinzuoying 左營·新左營
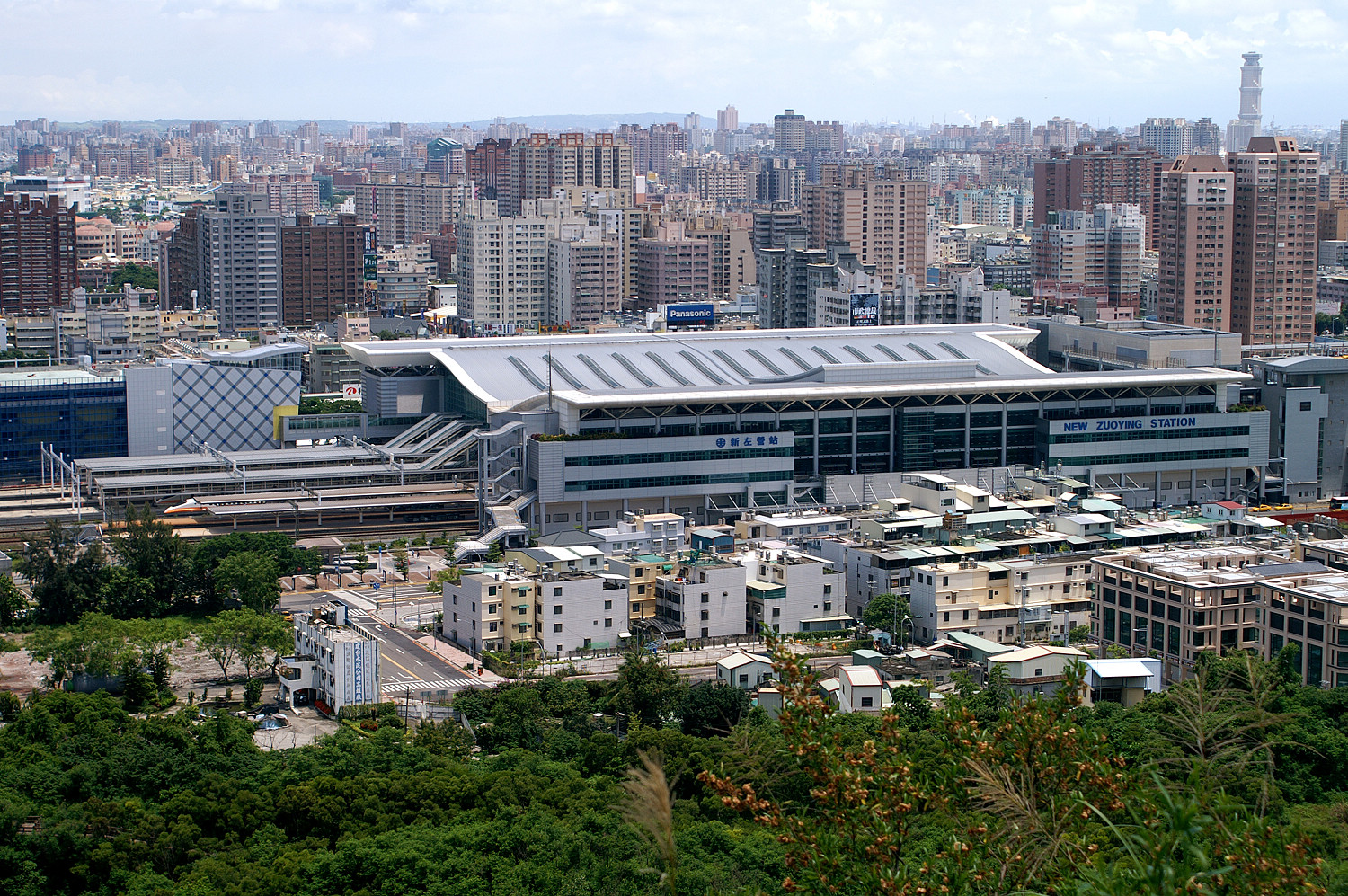

Chinese name
- Traditional Chinese: 左營
- Simplified Chinese: 左营
Transcriptions
Standard Mandarin
- Hanyu Pinyin: Zuǒyíng
- Bopomofo: ㄗㄨㄛˇ ㄧㄥˊ

Alternative Chinese name
- Traditional Chinese: 新左營
- Simplified Chinese: 新左营
- Literal meaning: New Zuoying
Transcriptions
Standard Mandarin
- Hanyu Pinyin: Xīnzuǒyíng
- Bopomofo: ㄒㄧㄣ ㄗㄨㄛˇ ㄧㄥˊ

General information
- Location: 105 Gaotie Rd; Zuoying District, Kaohsiung; Taiwan
- Coordinates: 22.6874°N 120.3074°E
- System: THSR and TR railway station
- Lines: THSR; Western Trunk line
- Distance: 345.1 km (THSR); 391.3 km to Keelung via Taichung (TRA)
- Connections: Rapid transit; Local bus; Coach

Construction
- Structure type: Ground level

Other information
- Station code: ZUY／12 (THSR); 288 (TRA three-digit); 1242 (TRA four-digit); A874 (TRA statistical); ㄒㄗㄛ (TRA telegraph)
- Classification: First class (Chinese: 一等) (TRA)

History
- Opened: 2006-12-01

Key dates
- 2007-01-05: THSR opened

Passengers
- 2018: 18.233 million per year ▲2.88% (THSR)
- Rank: 3 out of 12
- 2017: 6.501 million per year ▲10.83% (TRA)
- Rank: 17 out of 228

Services
Preceding station	Taiwan High Speed Rail	Following station
Tainan towards Nangang	THSR	Terminus
Preceding station	Taiwan Railway	Following station
Nanzi towards Keelung	Western Trunk line	Zuoying–Jiucheng towards Kaohsiung
Location
- Location within Taiwan

Zuoying R16 左營
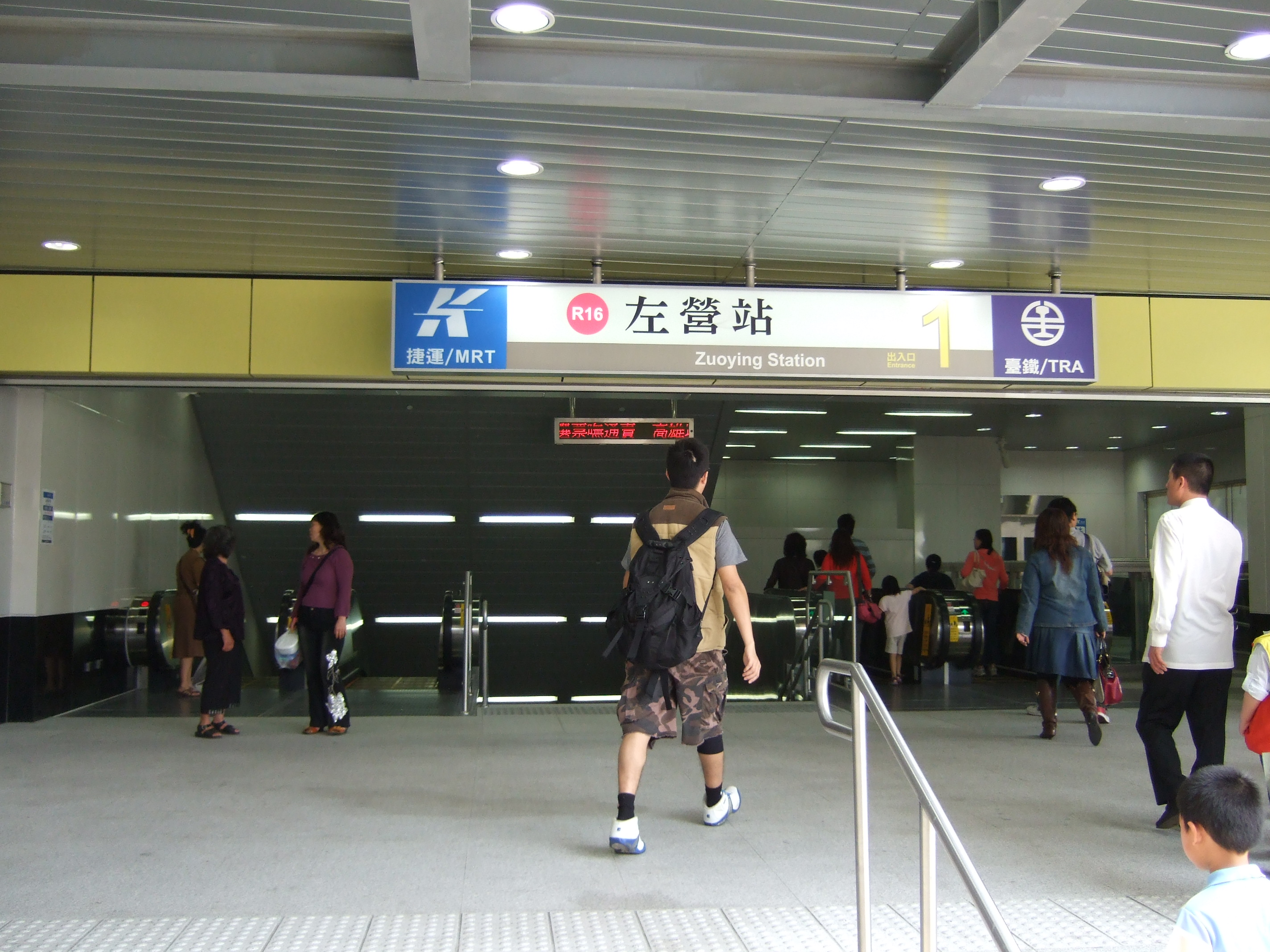
- Entrance 1

Chinese name
- Traditional Chinese: 左營
- Simplified Chinese: 左营
Transcriptions
Standard Mandarin
- Hanyu Pinyin: Zuǒyíng
- Bopomofo: ㄗㄨㄛˇ ㄧㄥˊ

General information
- Other names: THSR
- Location: B1F 107 Gaotie Rd; Zuoying District, Kaohsiung; Taiwan
- System: Kaohsiung Metro station
- Line: Red line
- Platforms: 1 island platform
- Tracks: 2

Construction
- Structure type: Underground

Other information
- Station code: R16

History
- Opened: 2008-04-07

Passengers
- 2017: 12.668 million per year
- Rank: 1 out of 37

Services
Preceding station	Kaohsiung Metro	Following station
World Games towards Gangshan	Red line	Ecological District towards Siaogang
Location

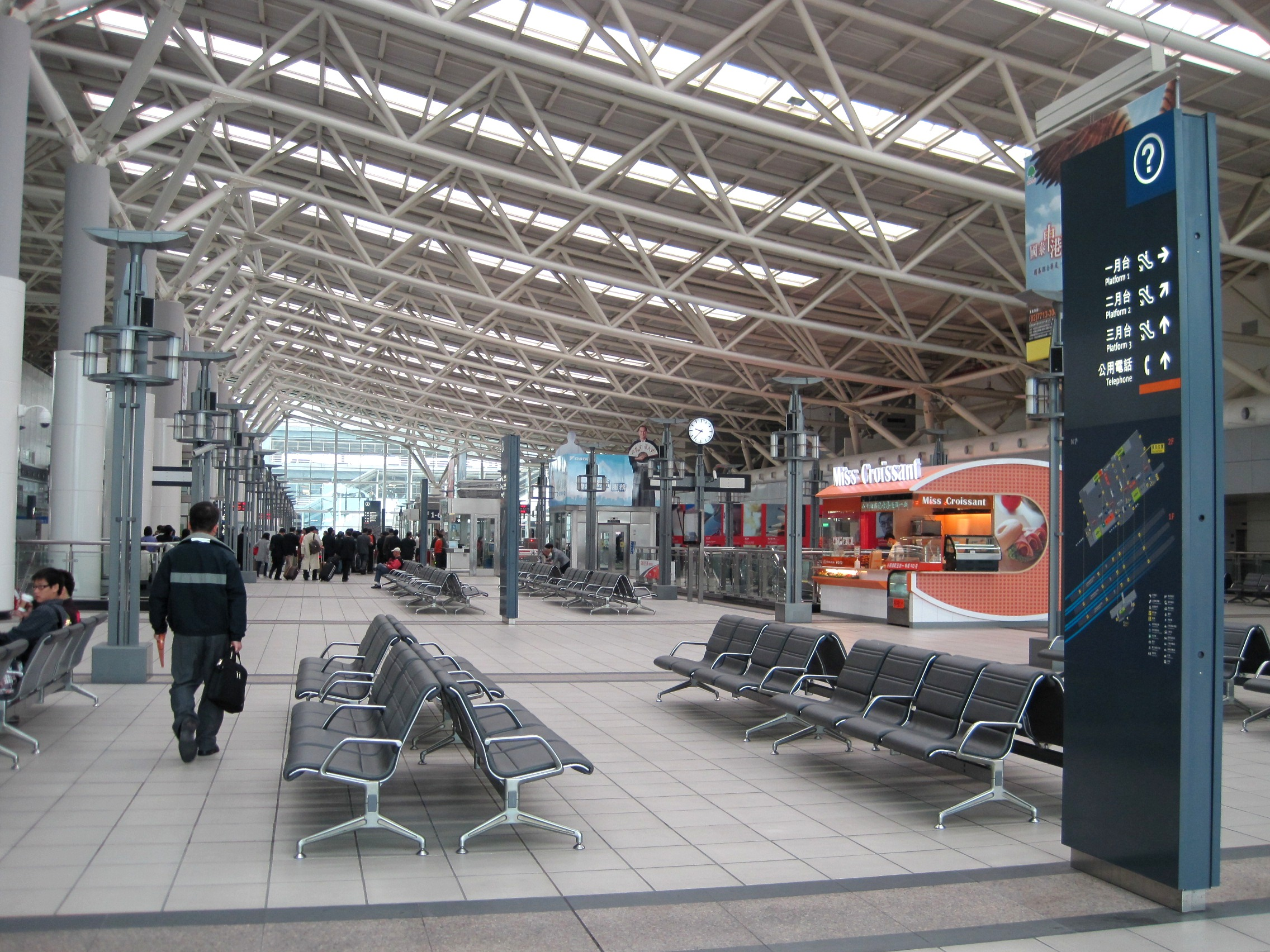
THSR Zuoying station concourse

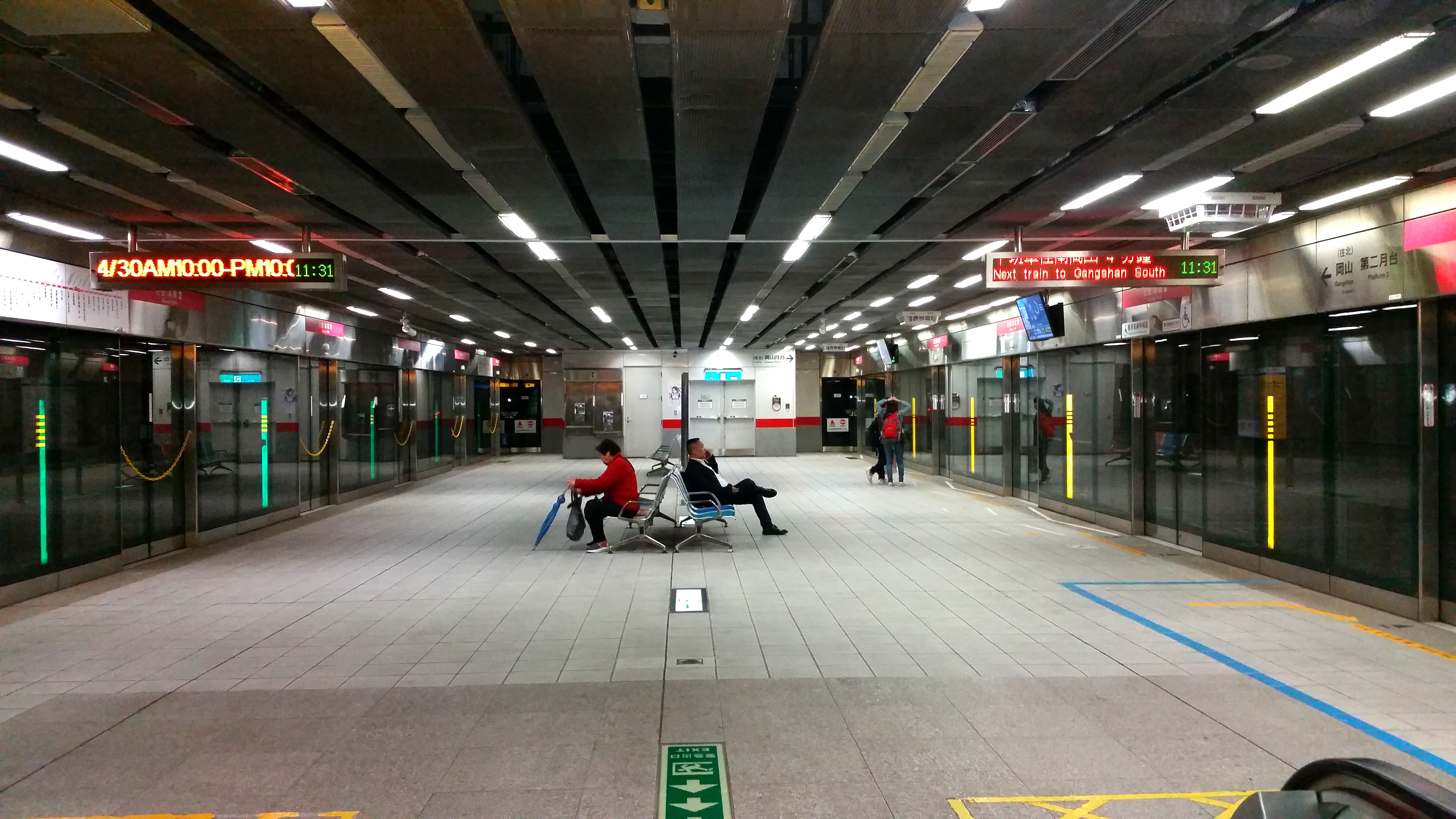
MRT Zuoying station platform

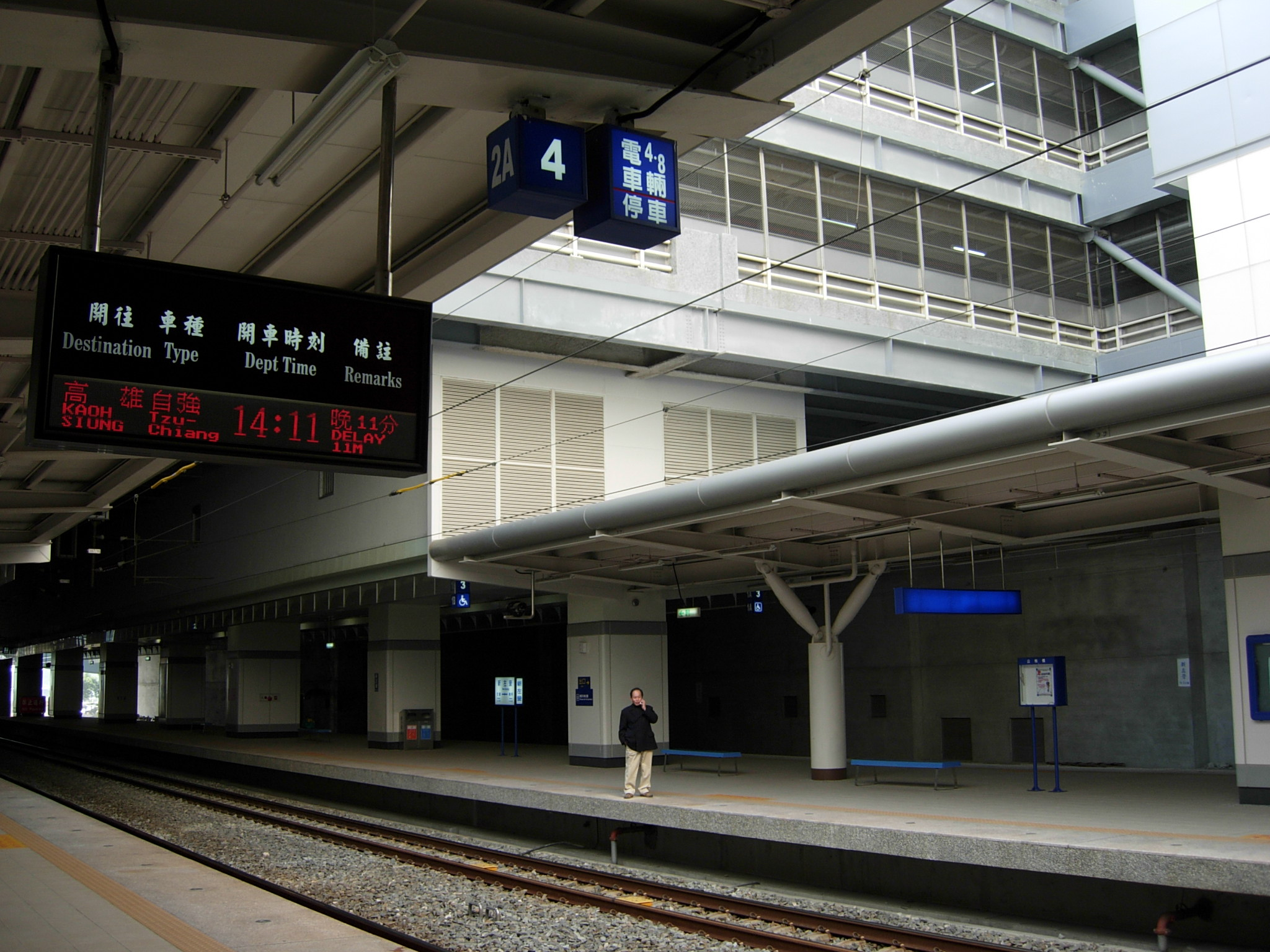
TR platform level

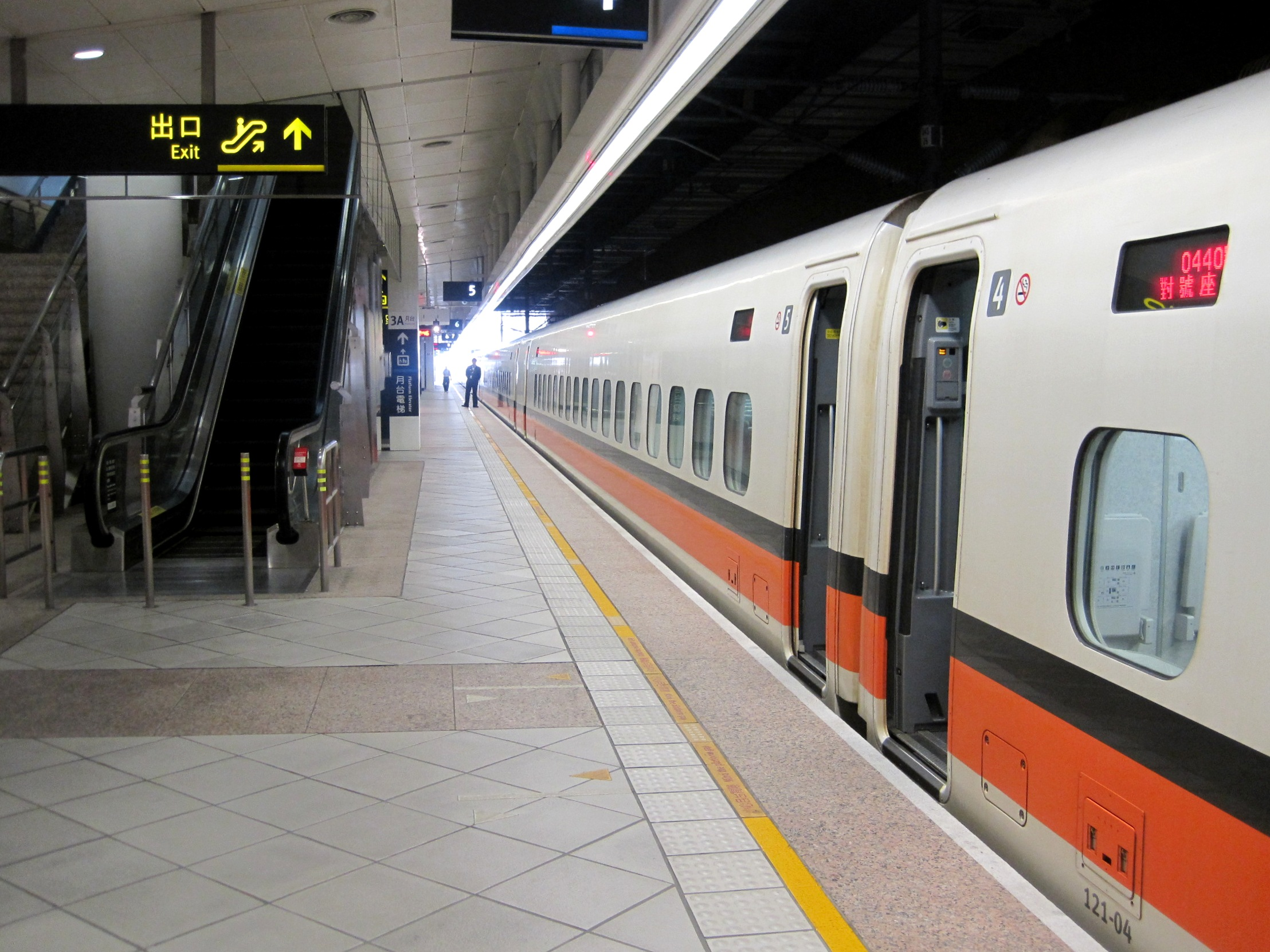
THSR platform level

Zuoying (Chinese: 左營; pinyin: Zuǒyíng) is a metro and railway station in Kaohsiung, Taiwan served by Kaohsiung MRT, Taiwan High Speed Rail, and Taiwan Railway (formerly Taiwan Railways Administration), where it is known as Xinzuoying (Chinese: 新左營; lit. 'New Zuoying'). The station is served by the fastest HSR express services of the 1 series.

== Overview ==
The station is located at the eastern foot of Mt. Panping (also known as Mt. Banping) in Kaohsiung, next to the South East Cement factory buildings. In addition to rail routes, the station is also close to National Highway No. 1, 3, 10 and Provincial Highway No. 1 and 17.

On 15 October 2009, Shin Kong Mitsukoshi won a deal to lease a building at the station and turn it into a shopping complex under a 10-year operate-transfer (OT) contract for NT$505 million (US$15.6 million). The new branch opened at the north-east corner of station on 1 April 2010. In June 2009, a folding bike rental station was set up at the MRT station to facilitate tourism in the city. The station is also equipped with vehicle and motorcycle parking lots.

== Structure ==
The TR and THSR parts are located in the above ground portion of the station, constructed together and opened for revenue service in January 2007 with the commencement of THSR service. As the current terminus of the line, the THSR part of the station has three island platforms serving six tracks. The TR part of the station has two platforms serving four tracks, with one additional through track.

The KMRT portion of the station is a two-level station located underground, at the northeastern part of the TRA/THSR station building. The station has two exits and opened for revenue service in March 2008. Dedicated exits between the KMRT station area to the TR platforms allow direct transfer between TR and KMRT trains. The KMRT part of the station has an island platform serving two tracks of the KMRT Red line.

== HSR services ==
HSR services 1xx, (1)2xx, (1)3xx, 583, 598, (1)6xx, and (8)8xx (Note: Section Northbound Service 88xx skips Zuoying, departing from Tainan.) call at this station.

== Nearby ==
- Confucius Temple of Kaohsiung
- Lotus Pond, Kaohsiung

== See also ==
- List of railway stations in Taiwan
