= Taiwan Sugar Museum (Tainan) =

- 台灣糖業博物館
- Location: East, Tainan, Taiwan
- Coordinates: 22°57′57″N 120°13′12″E
- Type: museum

The Taiwan Sugar Museum (traditional Chinese: 台灣糖業博物館; simplified Chinese: 台湾糖业博物馆; pinyin: Táiwān Tángyè Bówùguǎn) was a museum about sugar in East District, Tainan, Taiwan.

== Transportation ==
The museum is accessible south from Tainan Station of the Taiwan Railway.

== See also ==
- List of museums in Taiwan
- Taiwan Sugar Museum (Kaohsiung)
