= Ciaotou District =

District in Kaohsiung, Taiwan

Coordinates: 22.751805°N 120.301468°E

Ciaotou 橋頭區 Qiaotou, Chiaotou
- District
- Ciaotou District
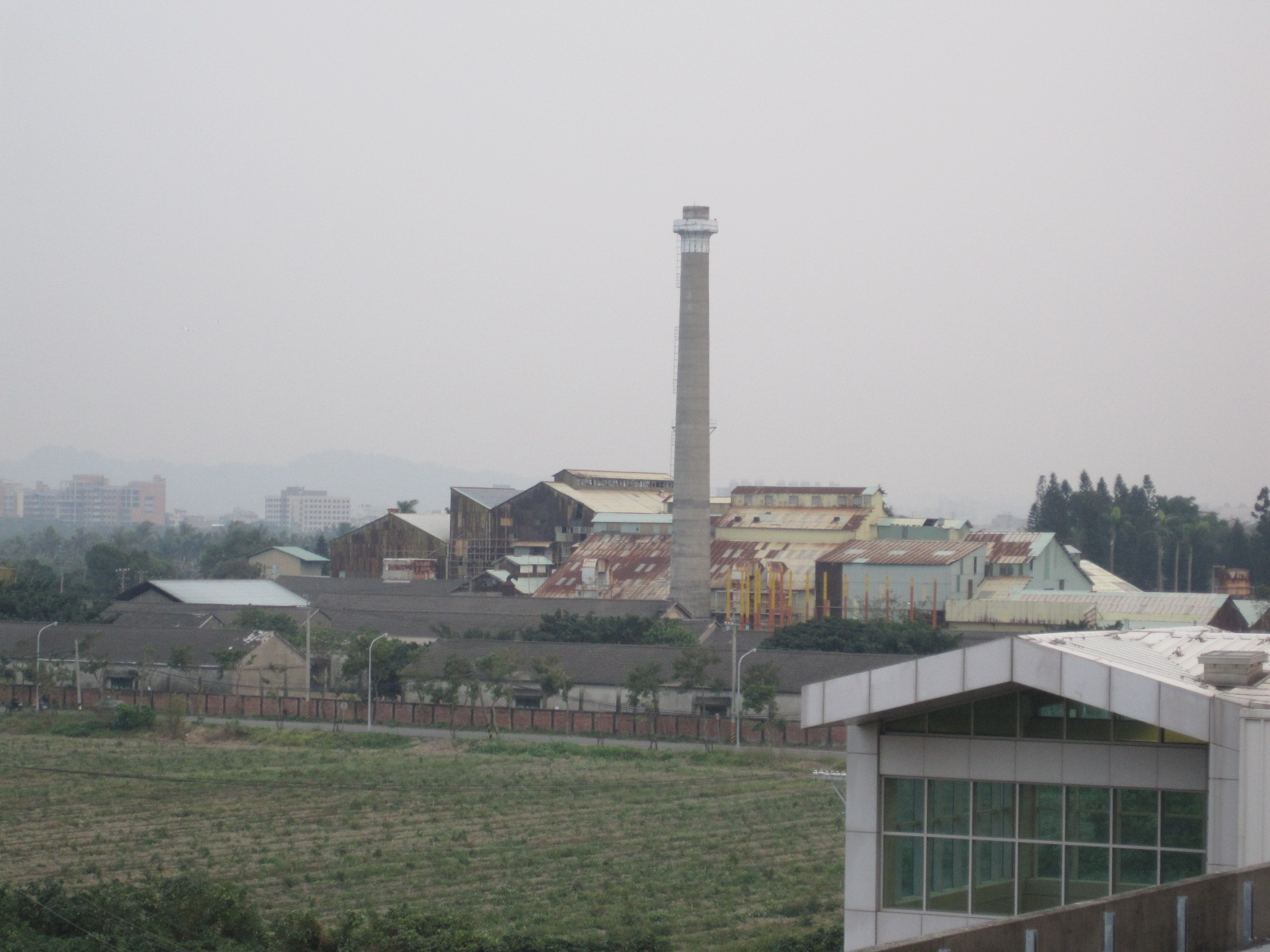

- 高雄市橋頭區公所; Welcome to Ciaotou District Office

- Ciaotou District in Kaohsiung City
- Country: Taiwan
- Region: Southern Taiwan

Area
  - Total: 25.9379 km^{2} (10.0147 sq mi)

Population (October 2023)
  - Total: 41,605
  - Rank: 18
  - Density: 1,546/km^{2} (4,000/sq mi)
- Website: ctc.kcg.gov.tw (in Chinese)

Ciaotou District (Chinese: 橋頭區; Hanyu Pinyin: Qiáotóu Qū; Tongyong Pinyin: Ciáotóu Cyu; Wade–Giles: Ch'iao^{2}-t'ou^{2} Ch'ü^{1}) is a rural district in Kaohsiung City, Taiwan.

== History ==
=== Empire of Japan ===
During the Japanese era, modern-day Gangshan District and Ciaotou were administered under Okayama Town (岡山街), Okayama District, Takao Prefecture. Ciaotou was the location of the first modern sugar refinery in Taiwan, and the Ciaotou station was built in 1901 to aid the refinery's transportation needs between Kaohsiung and Tainan. After the refinery closed in 1999, the location became Kaohsiung's Taiwan Sugar Museum.

=== Republic of China ===
After the handover of Taiwan from Japan to the Republic of China in 1945, Ciaotou was organized as a rural township of Kaohsiung County. On 25 December 2010, Kaohsiung County was merged with Kaohsiung City and Ciaotou was upgraded to a district of the city.

== Geography ==
Ciaotou has a land area of 25.9379 square kilometers, or 10.0147 square miles. It has 41,605 inhabitants as of October 2023, and belongs to the Kaohsiung metropolitan area. It is the 18th most populated district in Kaohsiung.

== Administrative divisions ==
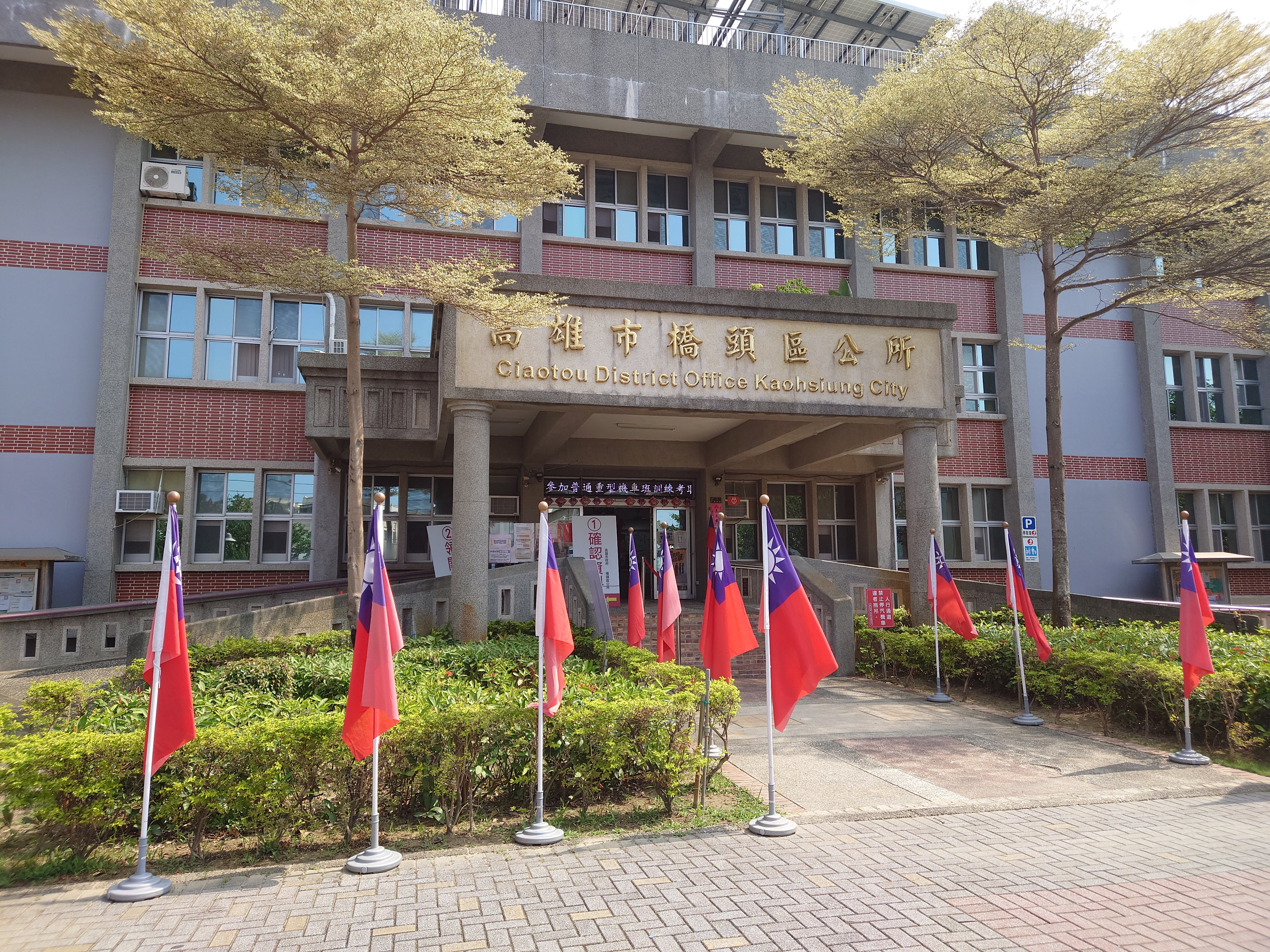
Ciaotou District Office

The district consists of Qiaotou, Qiaonan, Shilong, Shifeng, Yuliao, Tunglin, Xilin, Baishu, Bixiu, Xinzhuang, Jiabei, Jianan, Dingyan, Zhongqi, Shihe, Desong and Sande Village.

== Politics ==
The district is part of Kaohsiung City Constituency II electoral district for Legislative Yuan.

== Tourist attractions ==
- 1114 Memorial Park
- Bamboo Grove Park
- Qiaotou Fengqiao Temple (橋頭鳳橋宮)
- Jioujiawei Yishan Temple (九甲圍義山宮)
- Ciaotou Night Market (橋頭夜市)
- Ciaotou Old Street (橋頭老街)
- Kaohsiung Metropolitan Park
- Shueiliou Village
- Taiwan Sugar Museum
- Three Kings Temple (三山國王廟)

== Transportation ==
Ciaotou is served by the Ciaotou, Ciaotou Sugar Refinery, and Cingpu stations of the Kaohsiung Metro. The Ciaotou metro station can also connect to the Western Trunk line of Taiwan Railway.

Ciaotou is also served by Provincial Highways 1 and 17.

== Notable natives ==
- Tai Chen-yao, Vice Minister of Council of Agriculture (2003-2005)
