= Ciaotou Sugar Refinery metro station =

Metro station in Kaohsiung, Taiwan

Ciaotou Sugar Refinery R22A 橋頭糖廠
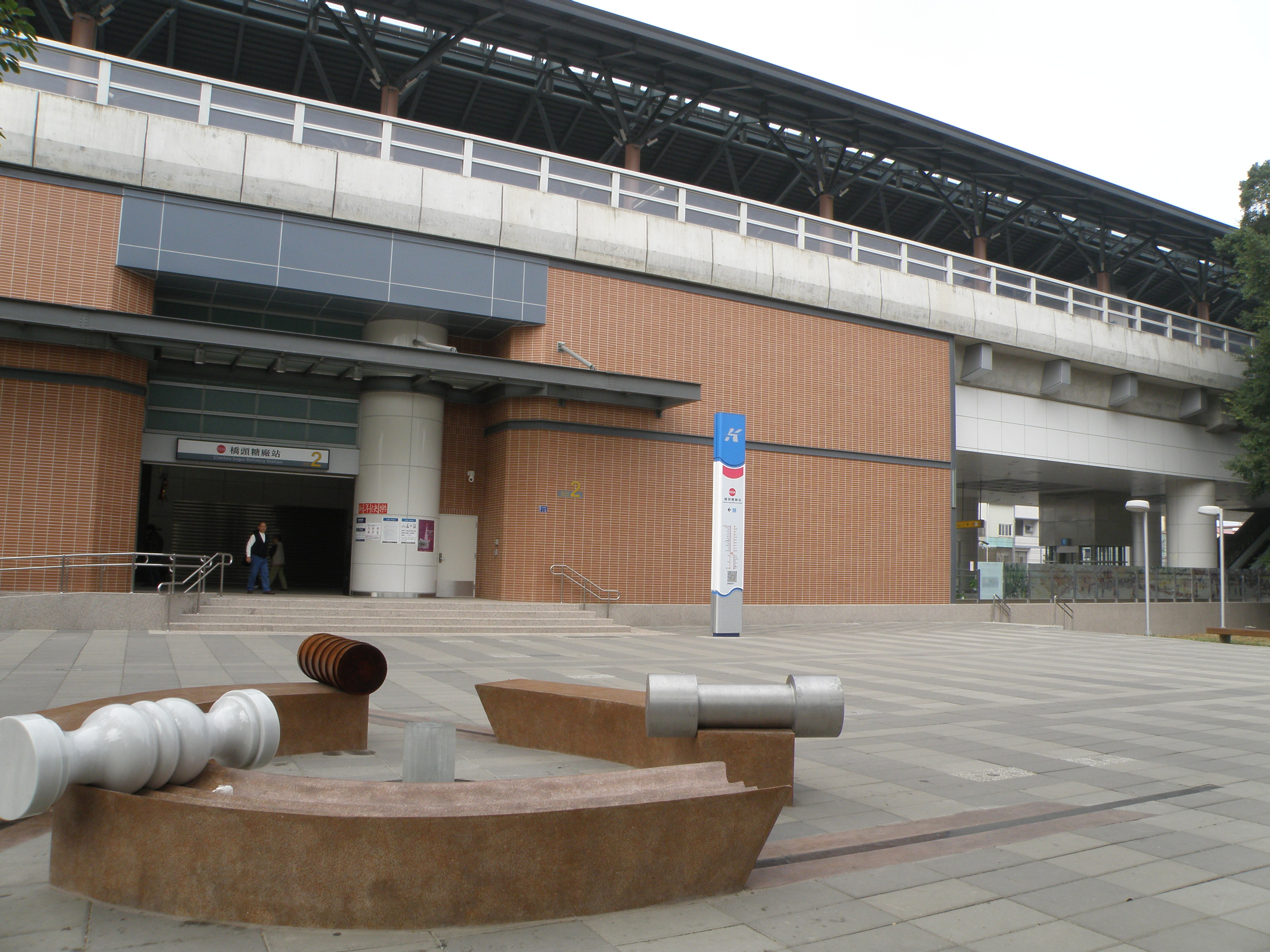
- Ciaotou Sugar Refinery station exit 2

Chinese name
- Traditional Chinese: 橋頭糖廠站
- Simplified Chinese: 桥头糖厂站
Transcriptions
Standard Mandarin
- Hanyu Pinyin: Qiaótóu Tángchǎng Zhàn
- Bopomofo: ㄑㄧㄠˊ ㄊㄡˊ ㄊㄤˊ ㄔㄤˇ ㄓㄢˋ
- Wade–Giles: Ch'iao^{2}t'ou^{2} T'ang^{2}ch'ang^{3} Chan^{4}
- Tongyong Pinyin: Ciaótóu Tángchǎng Jhàn

General information
- Location: Ciaotou, Kaohsiung; Taiwan
- Coordinates: 22°45′11″N 120°18′53″E
- Operated by: Kaohsiung Rapid Transit Corporation
- Line: Red line (R22A)
- Platforms: 1 island platform

Construction
- Structure type: Elevated

History
- Opened: 2008-03-09

Passengers
- 1,359 daily (Jan. 2011)

Services
Preceding station	Kaohsiung Metro	Following station
Ciaotou towards Gangshan	Red line	Cingpu towards Siaogang
Location

Ciaotou Sugar Refinery is a station on the Red line of Kaohsiung Metro in Ciaotou District, Kaohsiung, Taiwan. Added during the planning of the metro to fill a gap between Cingpu metro station and Ciaotou station, Ciaotou Sugar Refinery station was built near the former Ciaotou Sugar Refinery, which had been converted into the Taiwan Sugar Museum. The station opened in 2008, along with the rest of the Red line. In 2020, a stray cat named Mikan was appointed as station master, and rapidly became a symbol of the wider metro.

== Structure ==
The 167-metre (548 ft) station is a three-level, elevated station with one island platform and three exits.

== History ==
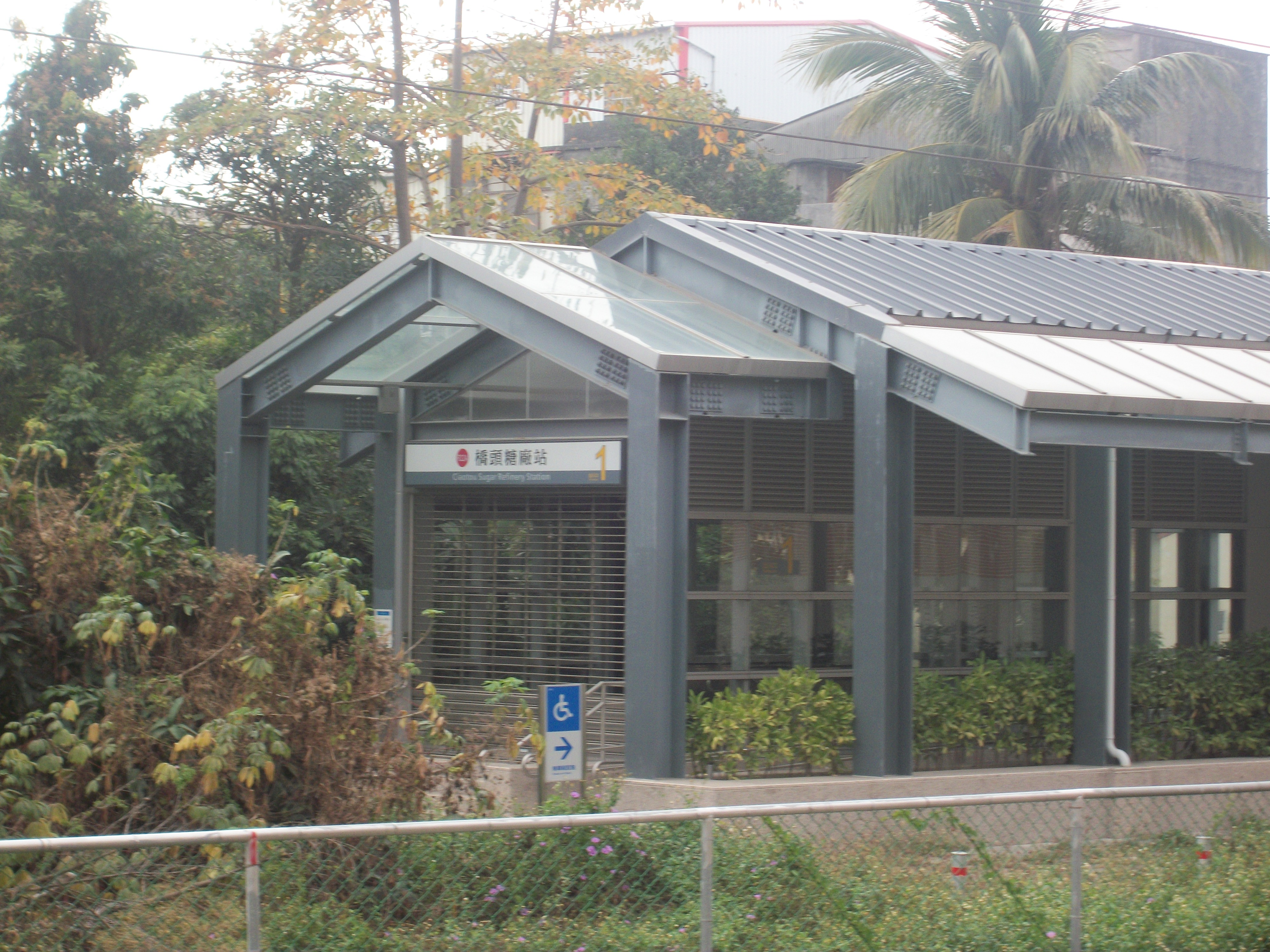
Exit 1, opened in June 2013

Planning for the Kaohsiung Metro began in 1989. While Ciaotou Sugar Refinery station was not part of the original plans, the distance between the planned Cingpu metro station (designated R22) and Ciaotou station (R23) was 1,947 metres (6,388 ft), much longer than the standard 1,000 metres (3,300 ft) distance between stations. As development in the area began to be viewed as increasingly important, Ciaotou Sugar Refinery station was planned and given the designation R22A.

The area around the Ciaotou Sugar Refinery was planned to be a new development in 1991. While these plans were abandoned in 1997, with development focus shifted 5 kilometres (3.1 mi) west, related plans to build part of the metro through the area continued. At the time, Ciaotou District's population was declining, and the government hoped the metro would reverse this trend, and create economic growth. Some locals opposed the development, noting it would involve destroying some historical sites, including parts of the refinery. The refinery was designated a historic site in 1998.

The Red line opened on 9 March 2008. Following the merger of Kaohsiung County with Kaohsiung City, new funds were devoted to improve the area. On 9 June 2014, an access road project for exit 1 of the station costing NT$212 million was completed. This had the goal of reducing congestion that had emerged as tourist numbers increased, as well as widening a road connecting exit 1 to the sugar refinery. Abandoned land next to exit 1 had long been a site for illegal dumping. During cleanup operations on 2 April 2020, a dead body was discovered. It was later discovered that the body had been disposed there on 17 December 2014, and two murder sentences were passed down on 12 April 2022.

In September 2020, a stray cat that had been adopted by station staff and named Mikan was appointed station master. Mikan was then incorporated into the branding of the station, and the Kaohsiung Metro as a whole. Mikan gained fame quickly, with fans visiting the station to meet him. These fans included Taiwanese President Tsai Ing-wen, who visited in March 2021.

The wider area through which the metro line was built has continued to see investment, including university, business, and housing development.

=== Ridership ===
Annual passenger numbers
Year	Boarding	Alighting
2008	462,510	474,517
2009	346,760	349,407
2010	288,845	297,245

== Around the station ==
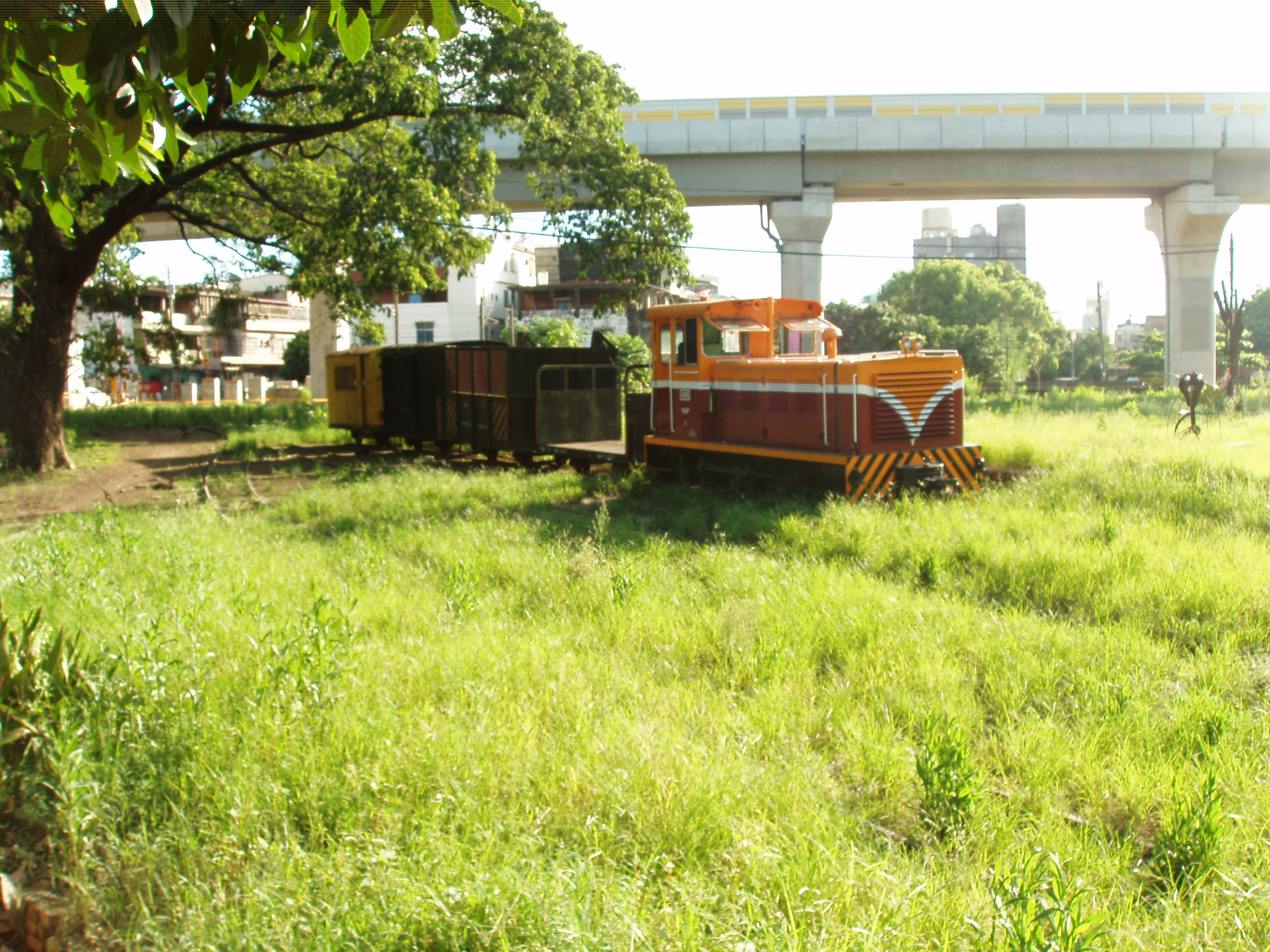
The metro line passing over the old Ciaotou Sugar Refinery

Through exit 2 is the former Ciaotou Sugar Refinery owned by the Taiwan Sugar Corporation. This large estate, first established in 1901, has now been converted into the Taiwan Sugar Museum (opened in 2006) and other facilities aimed at attracting tourism. The grounds contain some trees that were transplanted during the construction of the metro line. The sugar refinery is one example of older architecture preserved in the immediate area of the station.

Also nearby are:

- Taiwan Railway Administration Western Line railways
- National Kaohsiung University of Science and Technology
- Ciaotou Old Streets
- Singtang Elementary School
