= Taiwan Sugar Museum (Kaohsiung) =

Museum in Qiaotou, Kaohsiung, Taiwan

- 台灣糖業博物館
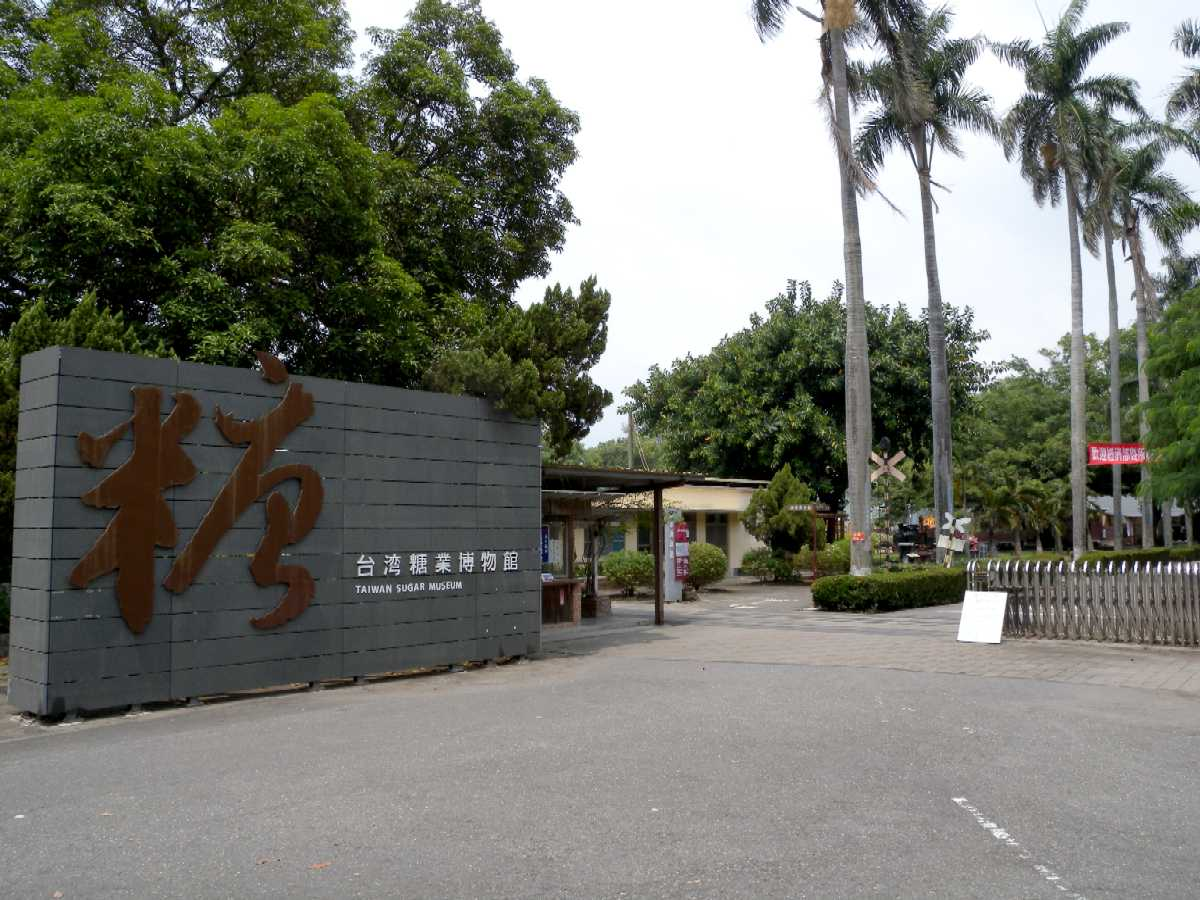
- Established: 2006
- Location: Ciaotou, Kaohsiung, Taiwan
- Coordinates: 22°45′28″N 120°18′51″E
- Type: museum
- Website: www.tscleisure.com.tw/museum

The Taiwan Sugar Museum (traditional Chinese: 台灣糖業博物館; simplified Chinese: 台湾糖业博物馆; pinyin: Táiwān Tángyè Bówùguǎn) is a museum about sugar in Ciaotou District, Kaohsiung, Taiwan.

== History ==
The museum building dates back to the Japanese rule of Taiwan when it was constructed as a sugar refinery factory in 1901 and completed in 1902. The factory underwent second and third stages of construction in 1905-1911 and 1911-1945 respectively which focused on the construction of leisure and religious needs of the employees. During World War II, two factories were damaged during bomb raids. They were then restored. Due to the declining of world's sugar price, the factory ceased to operate in 1999. The area was then turned into museum and opened in 2006.

== Transportation ==
The museum is accessible from Ciaotou Sugar Refinery station of the Kaohsiung MRT.

== See also ==
- List of museums in Taiwan
- Taiwan Sugar Museum (Tainan)
