= Nanzi =

Nanzi may refer to:

- Anansi, an Akan mythological spider, also spelled Nanzi
- Nanzih District, Kaohsiung, Taiwan, also spelled Nanzi
- Nanzi railway station
- Lady Nanzi (died 480 BC), consort of Duke Ling of Wey in ancient China
- Southwest Cay, also known as Vietnamese: Đảo Song Tử Tây; Mandarin Chinese: 南子島/南子岛; pinyin: Nánzi Dǎo, an island on the northwestern edge of the Spratly Islands

== See also ==
- Nanzih Export Processing Zone metro station, Kaohsiung, Taiwan
