= Youchang =

Youchang may refer to:

- Youchang Forest Park, an urban park in Nanzih District, Kaohsiung, Taiwan
- Lin Yu-chang (林右昌; born 1971), a Taiwanese politician
- Inez Fung (馮又嫦; born 1949), a professor of atmospheric science
- Ma Su (190–228), courtesy name Youchang, a Chinese military general and politician

== See also ==
- Oil Refinery Elementary School metro station (油廠國小車站; pinyin: Yóuchǎng Guóxiaǒ Chezhàn)
