= Houjing =

Houjing may refer to:

- Houjing (猴精 "monkey spirit"), Monkeys in Chinese culture#Symbolism
- Houjing metro station, Kaohsiung, Taiwan
- Fa of Xia, given name Houjing, the 16th ruler of the Xia dynasty

== See also ==
- Hou Jing (died 552), Chinese military general and usurper
