= NTHS =

NTHS may refer to:

- National Technical Honor Society, an American honor society
- National Trunk Highway System, a system of expressways in China

== Schools ==
- Kaohsiung Municipal Nanzih Comprehensive Senior High School, Kaohsiung, Taiwan
- National Trail High School, New Paris, Ohio, United States
- New Town High School (Maryland), Owings Mills, Maryland, United States
- New Town High School (Tasmania), New Town, Tasmania, Australia
- New Trier High School, Winnetka, Illinois, United States
- North Tonawanda High School, North Tonawanda, New York, United States
- North Tahoe High School, Tahoe City, California, United States
- North Thurston High School, Lacey, Washington, United States
