= Metropolitan Park metro station =

Metro station in Kaohsiung, Taiwan

Metropolitan Park R21 都會公園
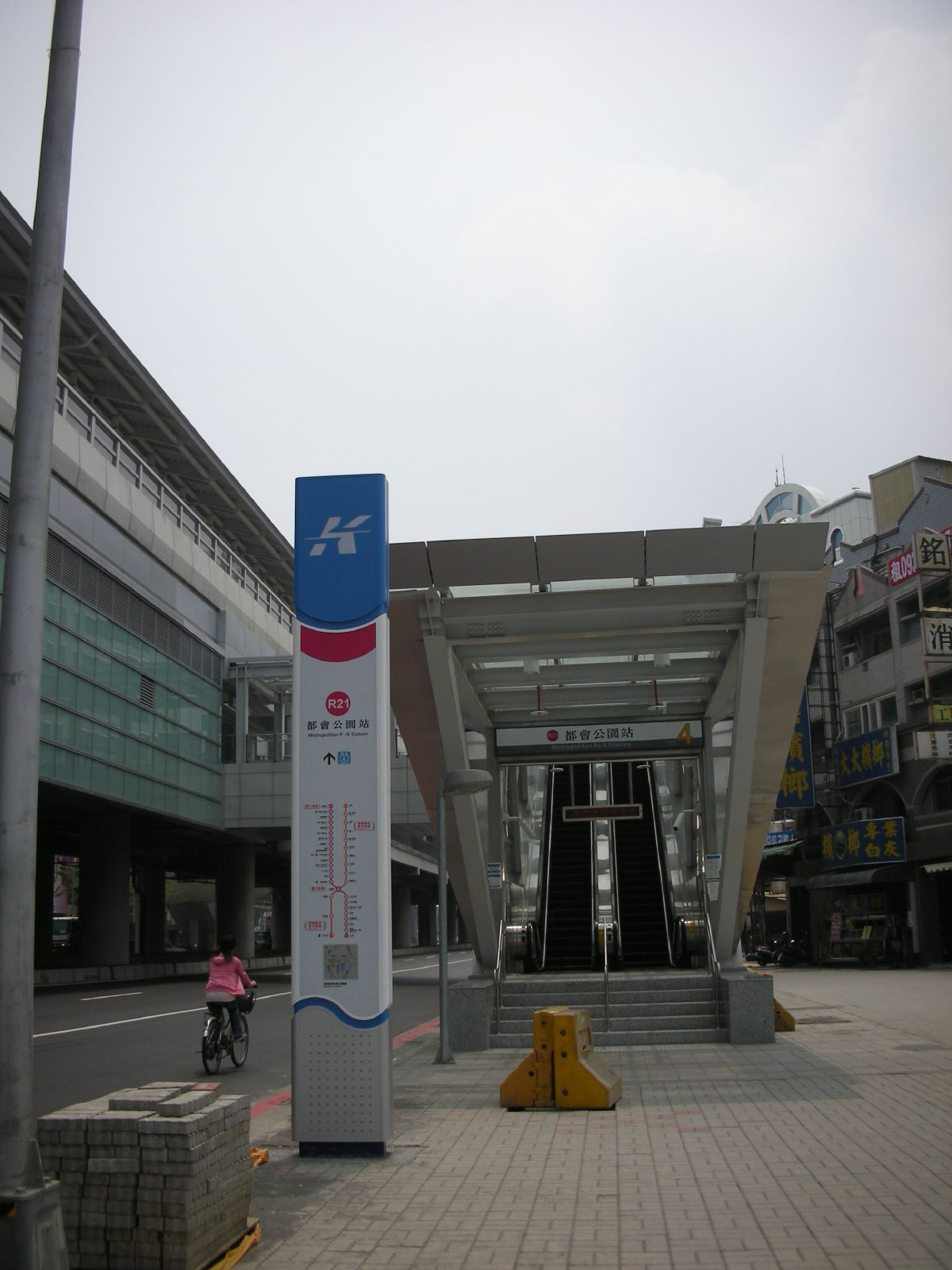
- Metropolitan Park station exit 1

Chinese name
- Traditional Chinese: 都會公園車站
- Simplified Chinese: 都会公园车站
Transcriptions
Standard Mandarin
- Hanyu Pinyin: Dūhùi Gōngyuán Chēzhàn
- Bopomofo: ㄉㄨ ㄏㄨㄟˋ ㄍㄨㄥ ㄩㄢˊ ㄔㄜ ㄓㄢˋ
- Wade–Giles: Du^{1}hui^{4} Gong^{1}yuan^{2} Ch'ê^{1}chan^{4}
- Tongyong Pinyin: Duhuèi Gongyuán Chejhàn

General information
- Location: Nanzih, Kaohsiung; Taiwan
- Coordinates: 22°43′46″N 120°19′15″E
- Operated by: Kaohsiung Rapid Transit Corporation
- Line: Red line (R21)
- Platforms: 1 island platform

Construction
- Structure type: Elevated

History
- Opened: 2008-03-09

Passengers
- 4,719 daily (Jan. 2011)

Services
Preceding station	Kaohsiung Metro	Following station
Cingpu towards Gangshan	Red line	Houjing towards Siaogang
Location

Metropolitan Park is a station on the Red line of Kaohsiung MRT in Nanzih District, Kaohsiung, Taiwan.

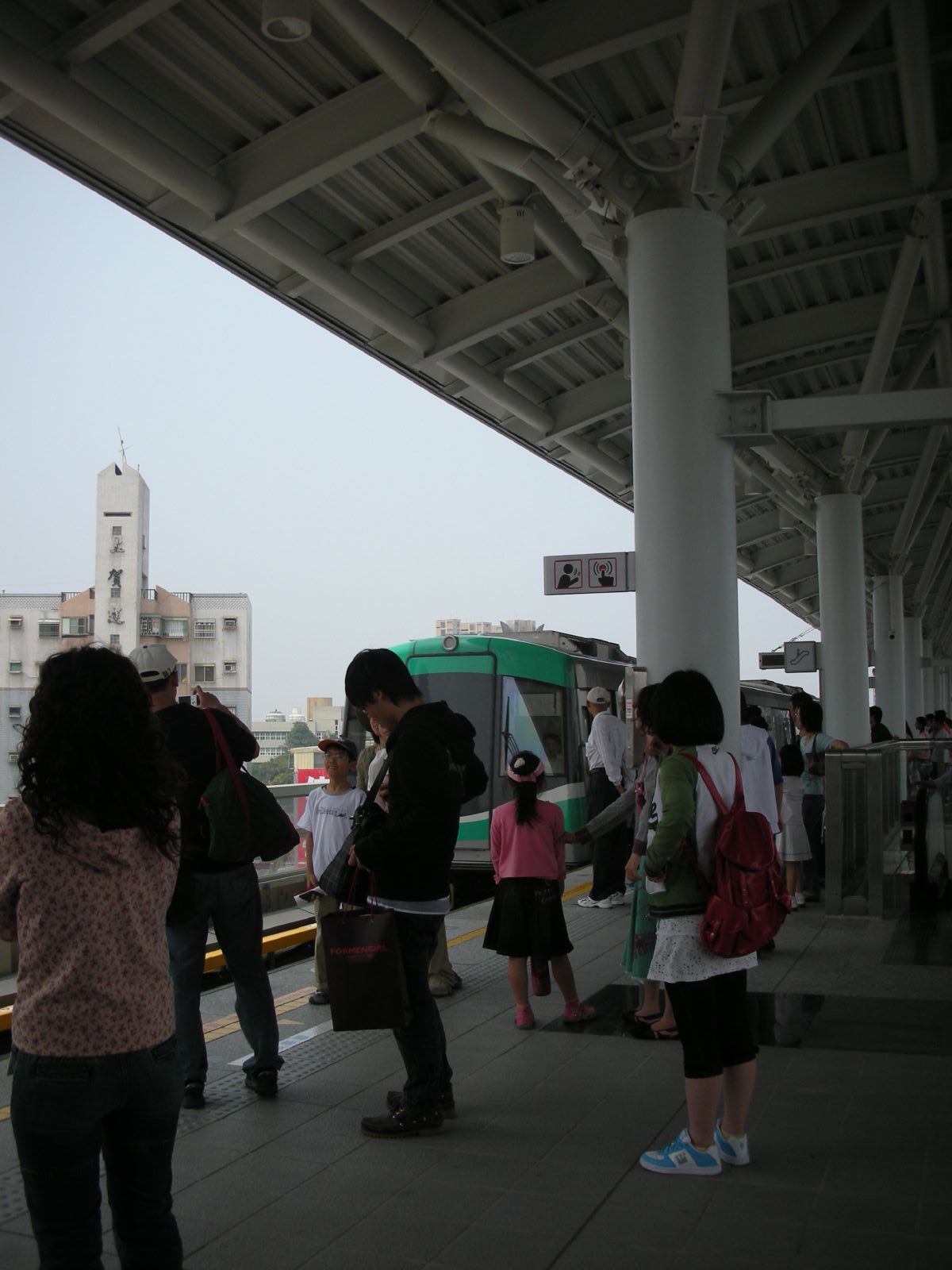
Platform of the Metropolitan Park station

This is a three-level, elevated station with one island platforms and four exits. It is 171 meters long and is located at the junction of Gaonan Highway and Cingnong Road.

== Around the station ==
- Kaohsiung Metropolitan Park
- Taiwan Railways Administration Nanzi Station
- National Kaohsiung Marine University
- Gaonan Highway
- Kaohsiung Blood Center
