= Guoguang Laboratory School, National Sun Yat-sen University =

- 國立中山大學附屬國光高級中學
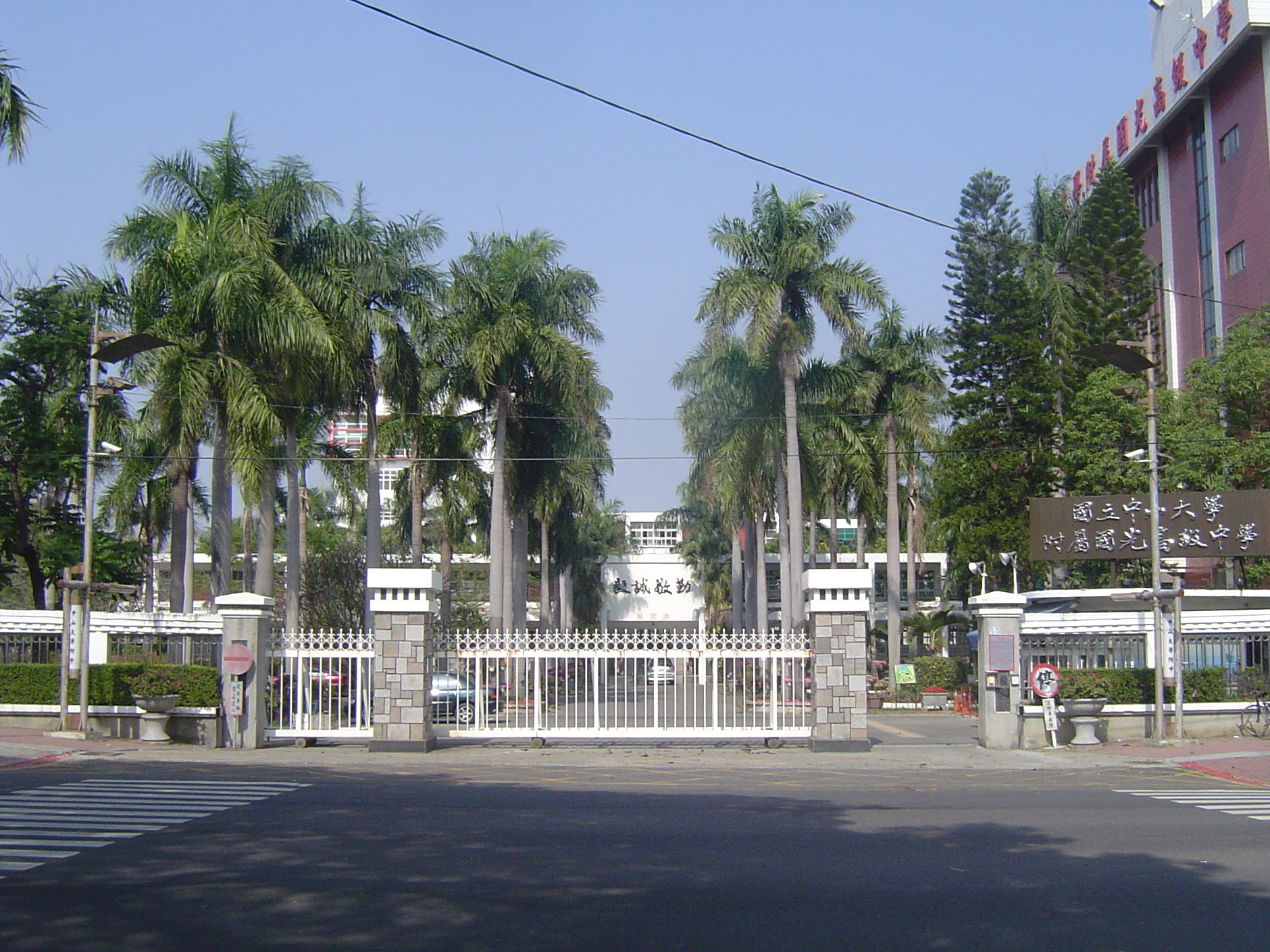

Location
- Nanzih District; Kaohsiung City; Taiwan
- Coordinates: 22.7082°N 120.3051°E

Information
- Type: Public High School
- Established: 1959
- Grades: 1~6
- Gender: Male & female
- Enrollment: 1,080
- Campus: 6.1264 hectares
- Affiliation: National Sun Yat-sen University
- Website: kksh.nsysu.edu.tw

Guoguang Laboratory School, National Sun Yat-sen University (GGSH or KKSH; Chinese: 國立中山大學附屬國光高級中學) is an affiliated school of National Sun Yat-sen University located in Nanzih District, Kaohsiung, Taiwan.

== See also ==
- Oil Refinery Elementary School Station
- National Sun Yat-sen University
- CPC Corporation
- Secondary education in Taiwan
