= Houjin River =

River in Kaohsiung, Taiwan

Coordinates: 22°42′50″N 120°15′26″E

Houjing River
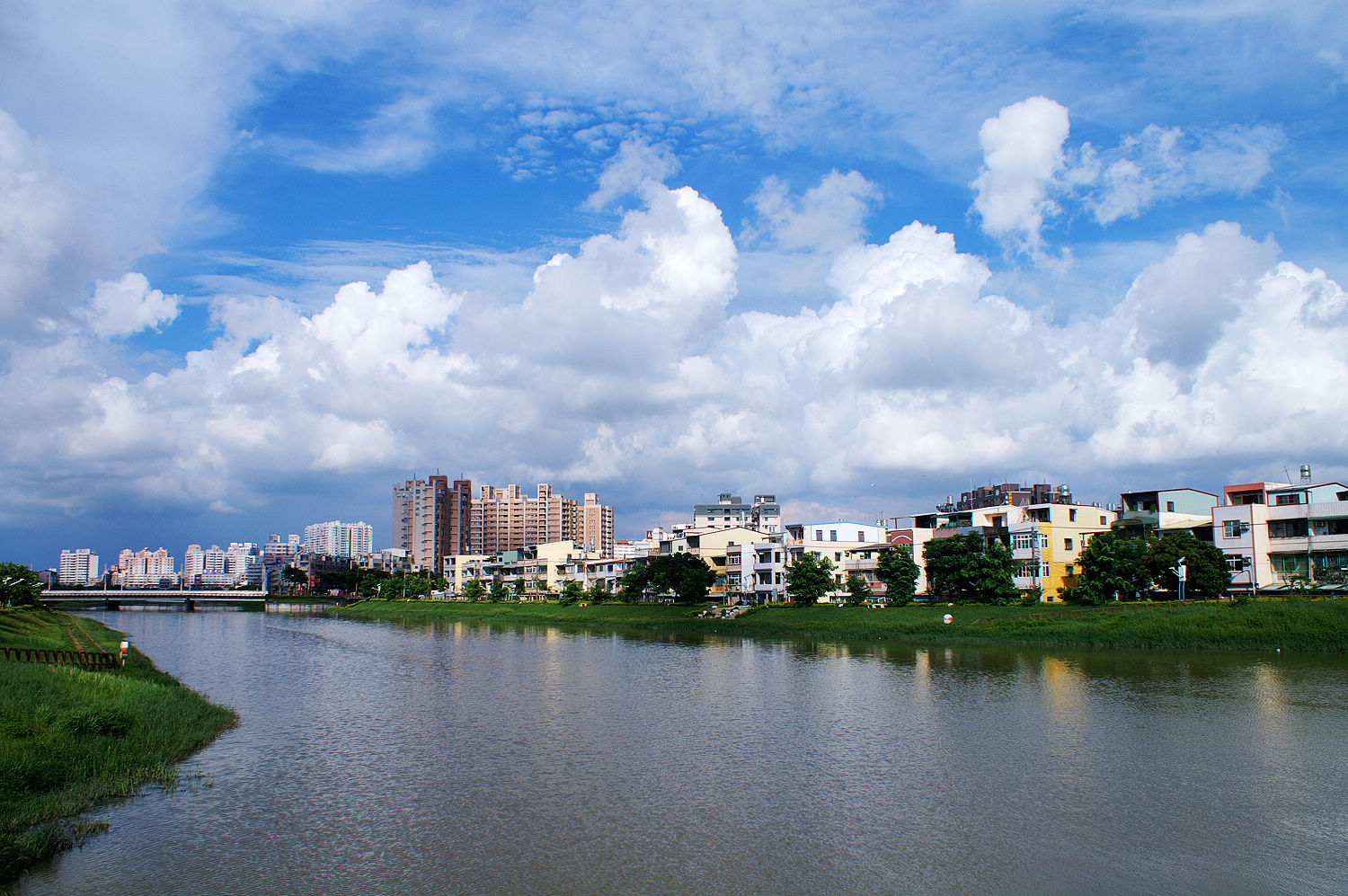
- Native name: 後勁溪 (Chinese)

Physical characteristics
- Source
  - location: Mount Guanyin
- Mouth: Taiwan Strait

The Houjing River (traditional Chinese: 後勁溪; simplified Chinese: 后劲溪; pinyin: Hòujìng Xī) is a river in Nanzih District, Renwu District and Ciaotou District of Kaohsiung, Taiwan.

== Geology ==
The river originates from Mount Guanyin in Dashe District. Once it reaches Bagualiao, the river passes through industrial areas. Once it passes the factories, the river comes to the Shihlong Creek and Yuanjhonggang Creek water intake stations, which supply irrigation water for 1,390 hectares of farmland in Ciaotou and Yanchao District. After that, it passes through the fish-farming area in Ziguan District and finally into the sea of Taiwan Strait at the Yuanjhonggang Wetlands. The river has been subjected to frequent environmental problems due to its location along major industrial areas in the region, such as the Dashe, Renwu and Jhuzaimen industrial parks.

== Economy ==
The river is used for 1,390 hectares of agricultural land irrigation in Ciaotou and Yanchao Districts and fish farming area in Ziguan District.

== Transportation ==
The river is accessible within walking distance north east of Houjing Station of Kaohsiung MRT.

== See also ==
- List of rivers of Taiwan
