= Yang Family Historical Residence =

Former residence in Nanzi, Kaohsiung, Taiwan

- 右昌楊家古厝
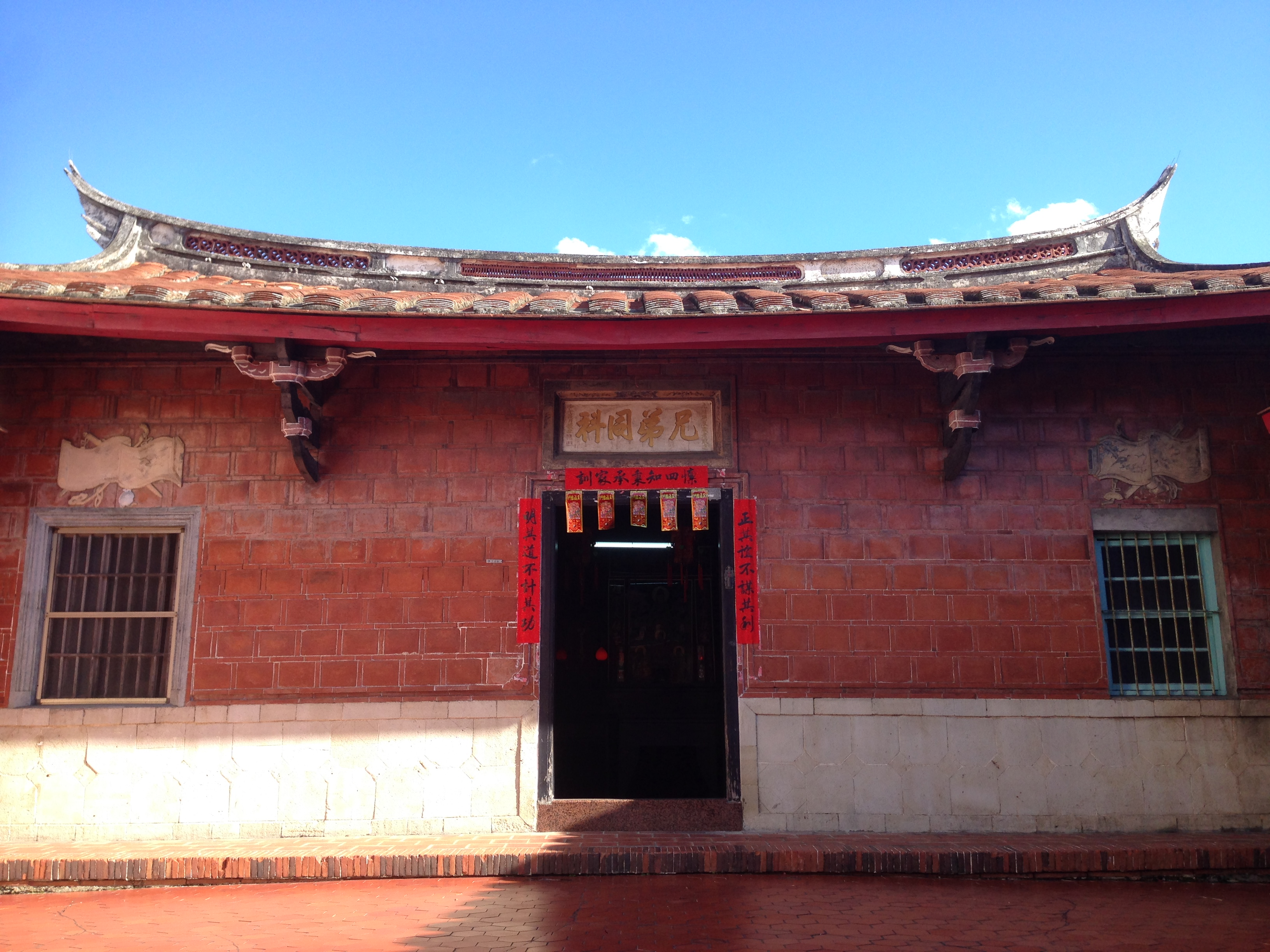
- Interactive map of the Yang Family Historical Residence area

General information
- Type: former residence
- Location: Nanzih, Kaohsiung, Taiwan
- Coordinates: 22°42′46.4″N 120°17′17.3″E
- Completed: 1882

The Yang Family Historical Residence (traditional Chinese: 右昌楊家古厝; simplified Chinese: 右昌杨家古厝; pinyin: Yòuchāng Yángjiā Gǔcuò) is a former residence in Nanzih District, Kaohsiung, Taiwan.

== History ==
The Yang family originally came from Fujian during the reign of Kangxi Emperor of Qing Dynasty. The house was declared a historical building on 27 August 2002.

== Architecture ==
The design of the house follows southern Fujian housing style with courtyard. It has three independent clusters. There is a lobby with two rooms on each side and two more rooms on the wings at the center of the building. Each outer wing on the left and right sides has five rooms.

== Transportation ==
The house is accessible within walking distance west of Oil Refinery Elementary School Station of Kaohsiung MRT.

== See also ==
- List of tourist attractions in Taiwan
