= Kaohsiung Metropolitan Park =

Park in Kaohsiung, Taiwan

- 高雄都會公園
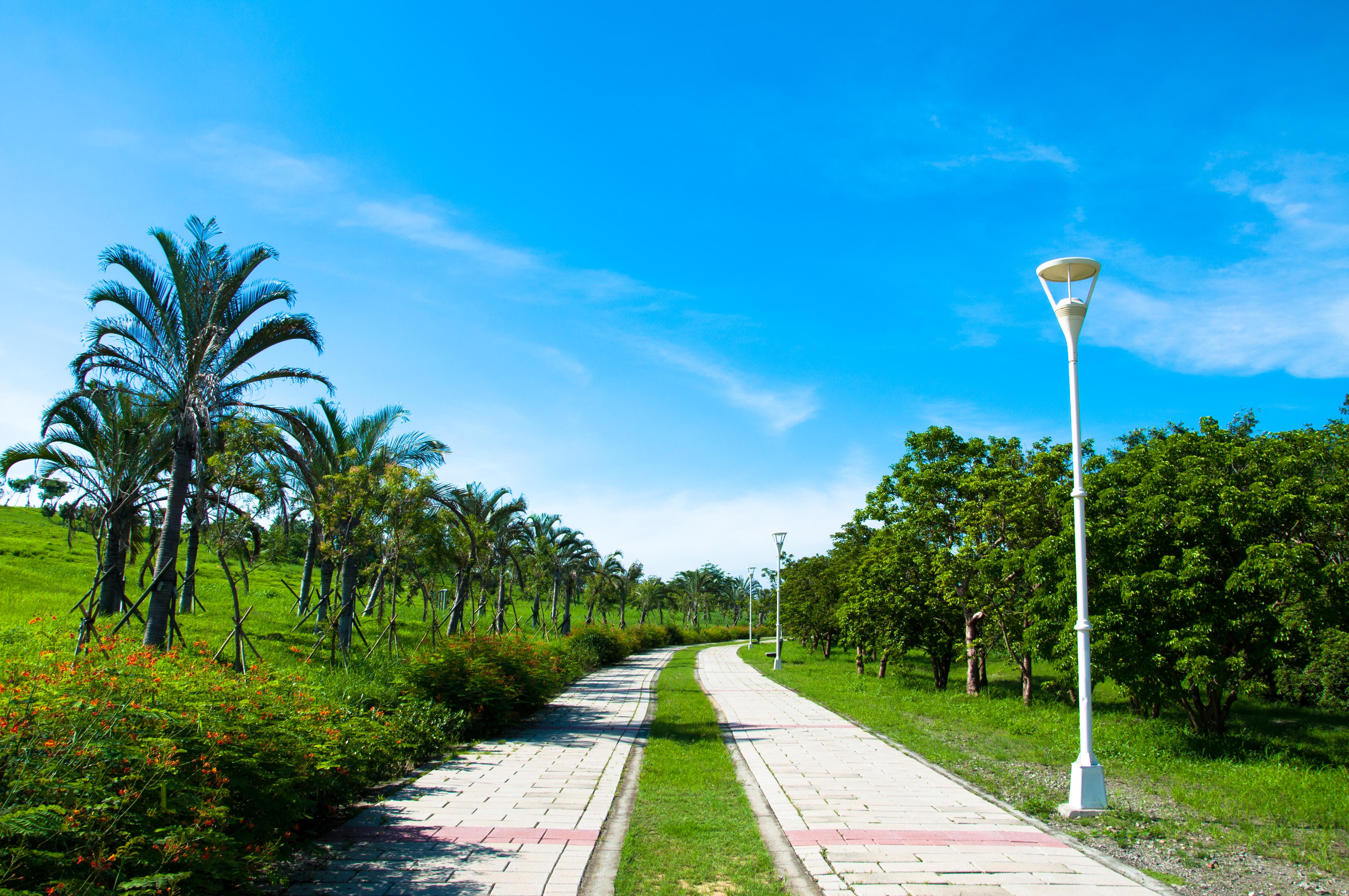
- Interactive map of Kaohsiung Metropolitan Park
- Type: park
- Location: Nanzih District and Ciaotou District of Kaohsiung, Taiwan
- Coordinates: 22°44′00.3″N 120°18′38.0″E
- Area: 35 hectares (86 acres)
- Administrator: Construction and Planning Agency of the Ministry of the Interior
- Status: Open all year
- Public transit: Metropolitan Park Station

The Kaohsiung Metropolitan Park (traditional Chinese: 高雄都會公園; simplified Chinese: 高雄都会公园; pinyin: Gāoxióng Dūhuì Gōngyuán) is a park in Nanzih District and Ciaotou District of Kaohsiung, Taiwan. The park is under the management of Construction and Planning Agency of the Ministry of the Interior.

== History ==
The park used to be a landfill. It was then converted into a park by the Executive Yuan to protect the environmental resources and improving the local environment.

== Geology ==
The park measures an area of 35 hectares (86 acres), which includes vast and flat grassland and forest greens. The plantation from Taiwan Sugar Qingpu occupies most of the park.

== Architecture ==
The park features the Golden Rooster Sundial sculpture which stands tall at the Central Square. There is a bronze cast illustration of the sundial shadow on the ground surface under the golden rooster. It also consists of a decorated swimming pool, an ecological exhibition room, parent-child playrooms and a library.

== Transportation ==
The park is accessible within walking distance northwest of Metropolitan Park Station of Kaohsiung Metro.

== See also ==
- List of parks in Taiwan
