= Oil Refinery Elementary School metro station =

Metro station in Kaohsiung, Taiwan

Oil Refinery Elementary School R18 油廠國小
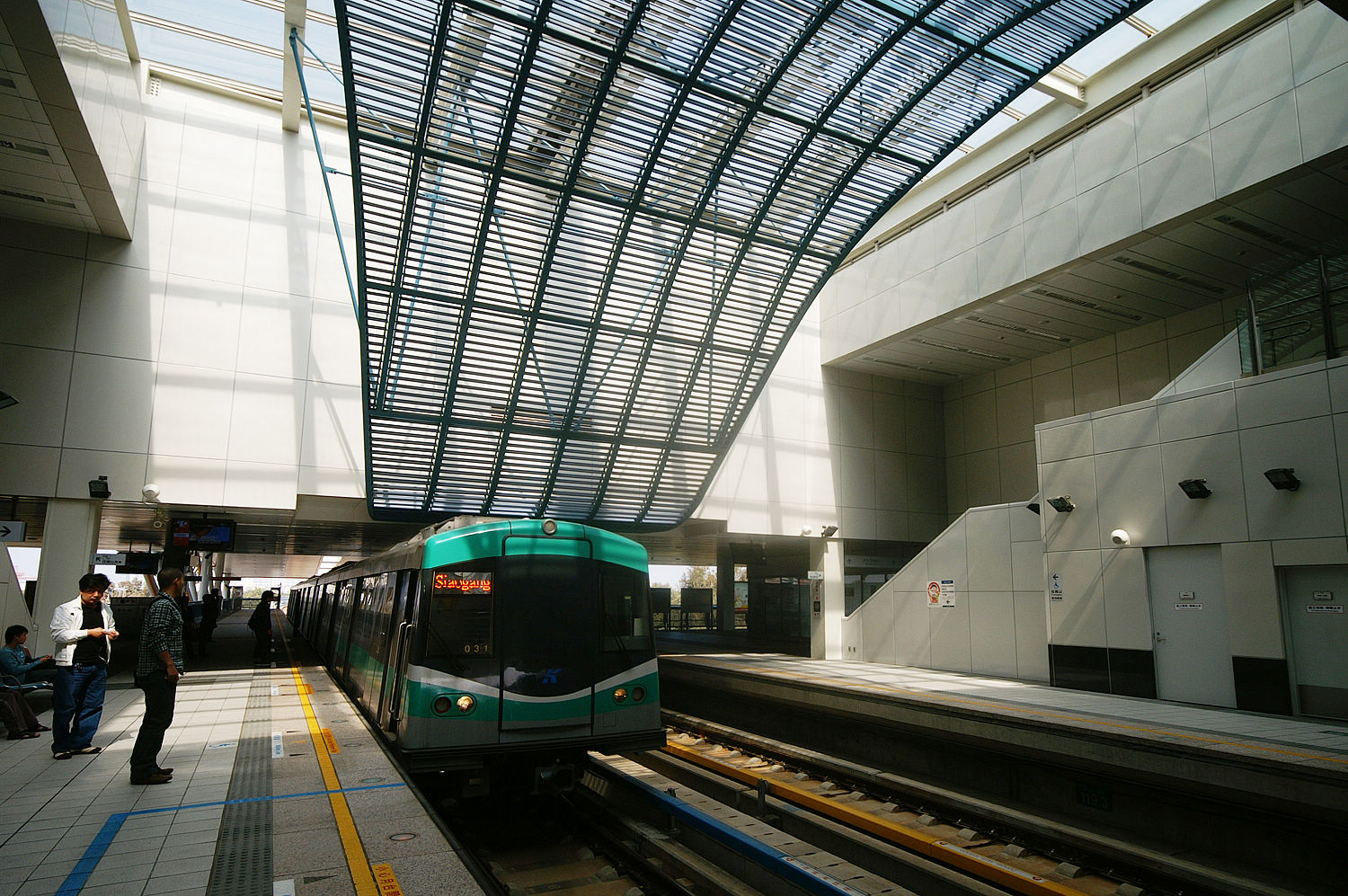
- Platform of the Oil Refinery Elementary School station

Chinese name
- Traditional Chinese: 油廠國小車站
- Simplified Chinese: 油厂国小车站
Transcriptions
Standard Mandarin
- Hanyu Pinyin: Yóuchǎng Guóxiaǒ Chezhàn
- Bopomofo: ㄧㄡˊ ㄔㄤˇ ㄍㄨㄛˊ ㄒㄧㄠˇ ㄔㄜ ㄓㄢˋ
- Wade–Giles: You^{2}ch'ang^{3} Kuo^{2}hsiao^{3} Ch'ê^{1}chan^{4}

General information
- Location: Nanzih, Kaohsiung; Taiwan
- Coordinates: 22°42′31″N 120°18′07″E
- Operated by: Kaohsiung Rapid Transit Corporation
- Line: Red line (R18)
- Platforms: 2 side platforms

Construction
- Structure type: Elevated

History
- Opened: 9 March 2008

Passengers
- 4,121 daily (Jan. 2011)

Services
Preceding station	Kaohsiung Metro	Following station
Nanzih Technology Industrial Park towards Gangshan	Red line	World Games towards Siaogang
Location

Oil Refinery Elementary School is a station on the Red line of Kaohsiung MRT in Nanzih District, Kaohsiung, Taiwan.

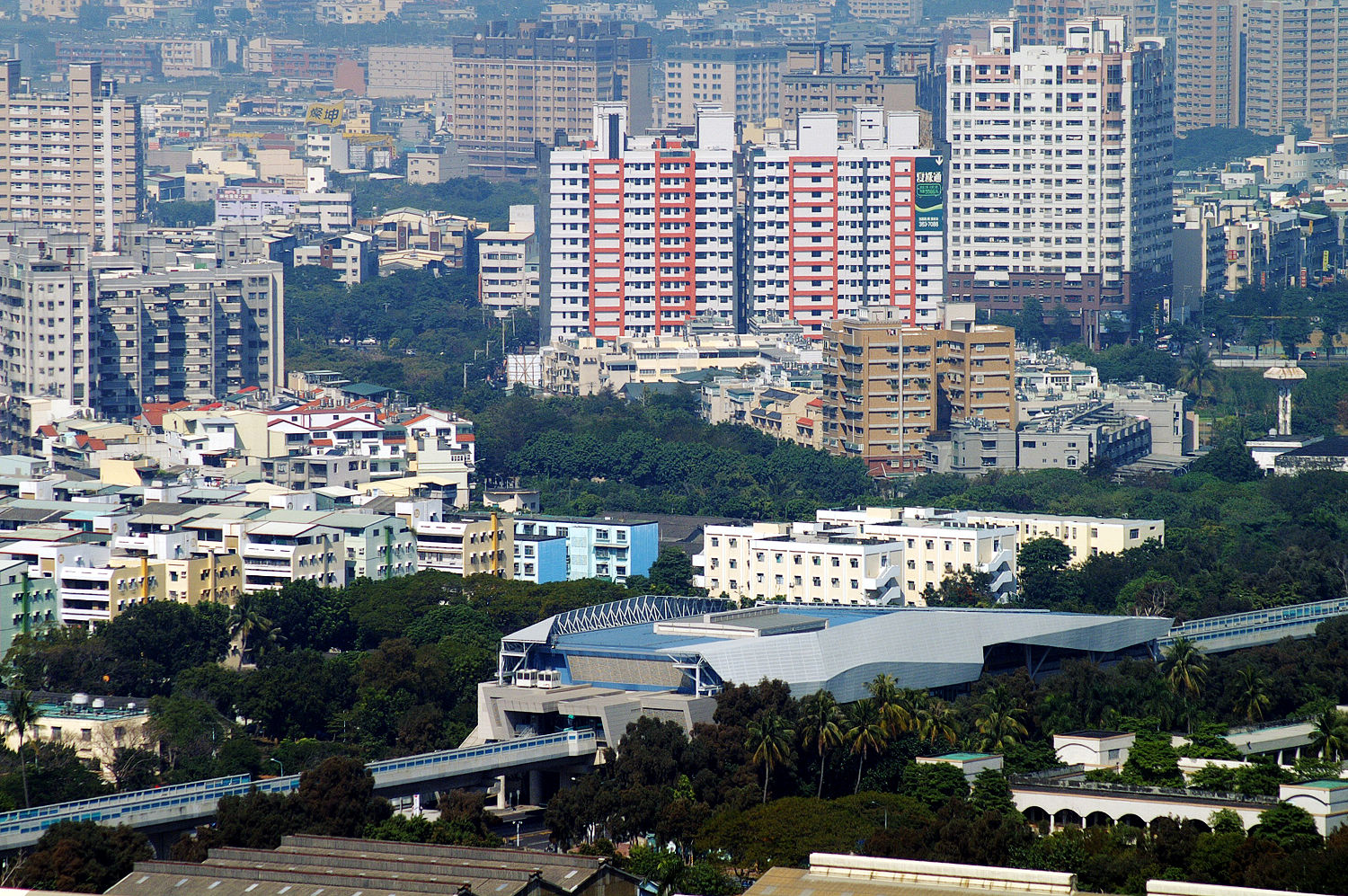
Bird's-eye view of the Oil Refinery Elementary School station

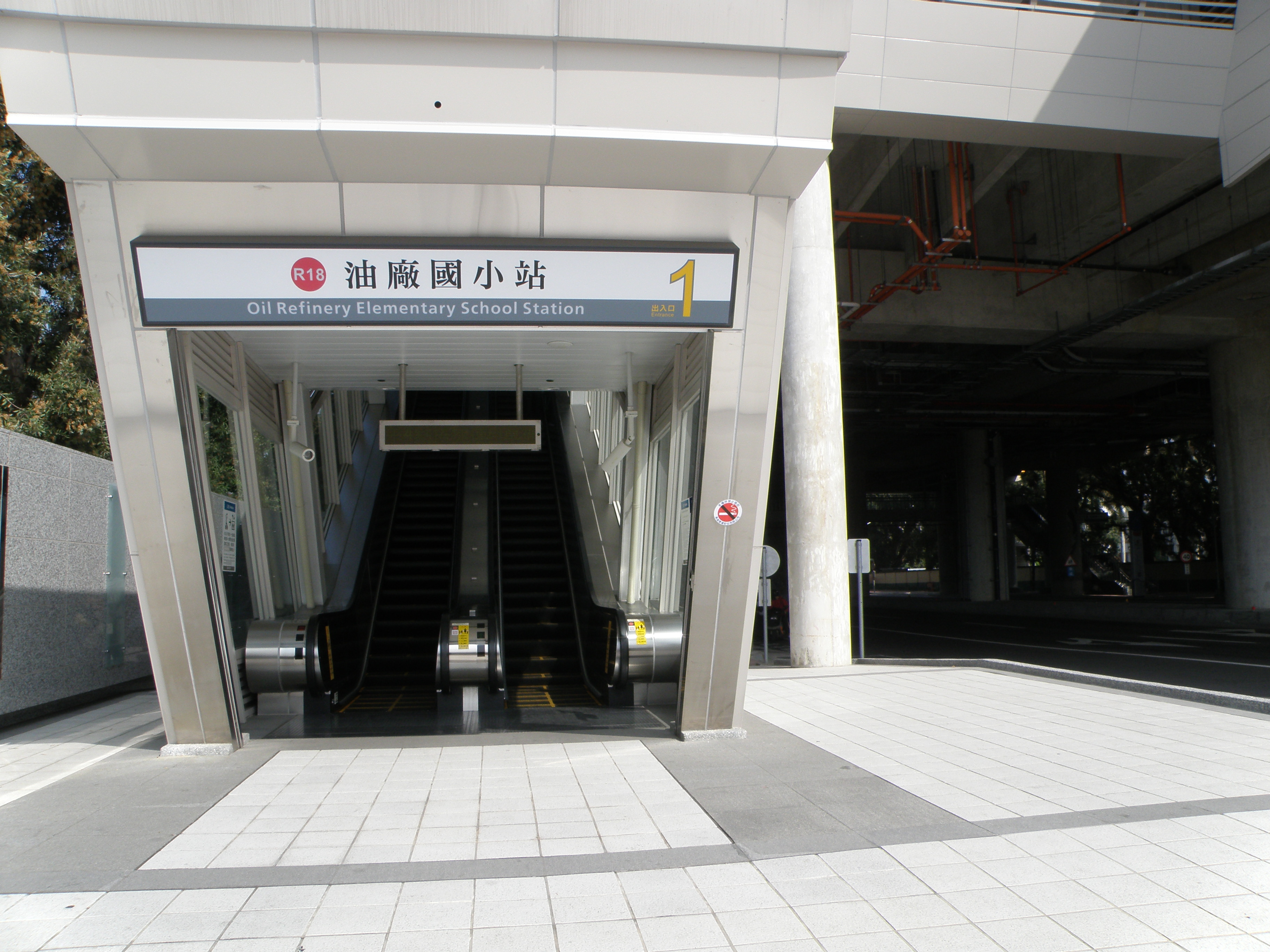
Exit 1 of Oil Refinery Elementary School station

This is a four-level, elevated station with two side platforms and four exits. It is 134 metres long and is located at the intersection of Zuonan Rd and Houchang Rd.

== Around the Station ==
- Oil Refinery Elementary School (Youchang Elementary School)
- Guoguang (Kuo Kwang) Laboratory School, National Sun Yat-sen University
- Kaohsiung Refinery Main Plant
- Refinery dormitory
- Guoguang New Village
- Yang Family Historical Residence
- Youchang Forest Park
