= Houjing metro station =

Metro station in Kaohsiung, Taiwan

Houjing R20 後勁
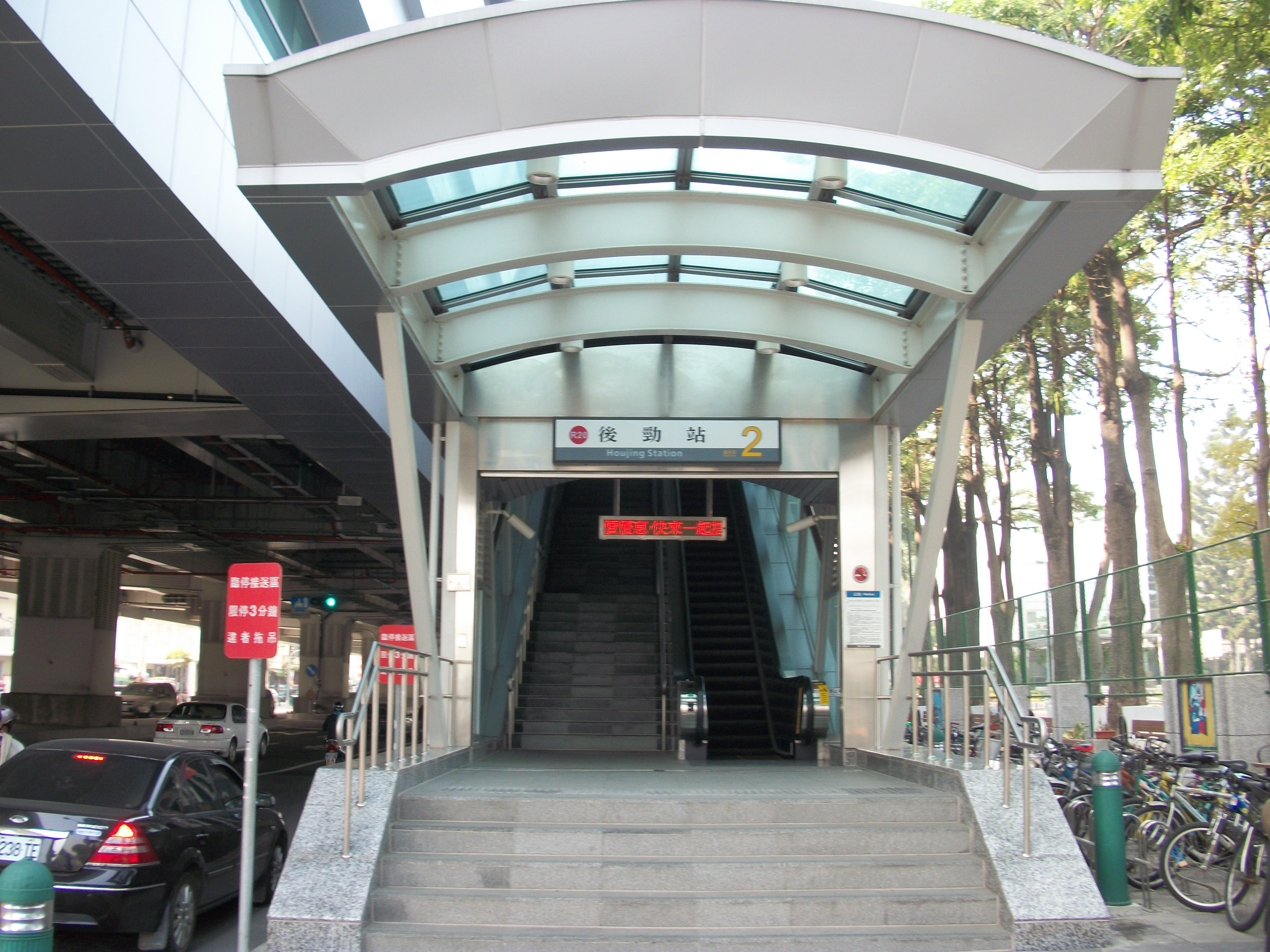
- Houjing station exit 2

Chinese name
- Traditional Chinese: 後勁車站
- Simplified Chinese: 后劲车站
Transcriptions
Standard Mandarin
- Hanyu Pinyin: Hòujìng Chēzhàn
- Bopomofo: ㄏㄡˋ ㄐㄧㄥˋ ㄔㄜ ㄓㄢˋ
- Wade–Giles: Hou^{4}ching^{4} Ch'ê^{1}chan^{4}
- Tongyong Pinyin: Hòujìng Chejhàn

General information
- Other names: National Kaohsiung Marine University; 海科大
- Location: Nanzih, Kaohsiung; Taiwan
- Coordinates: 22°43′20″N 120°19′01″E
- Operated by: Kaohsiung Rapid Transit Corporation
- Line: Red line (R20)
- Platforms: 2 side platforms

Construction
- Structure type: Elevated

History
- Opened: 2008-03-09

Passengers
- 2,036 daily (Jan. 2011)

Services
Preceding station	Kaohsiung Metro	Following station
Metropolitan Park towards Gangshan	Red line	Nanzih Technology Industrial Park towards Siaogang
Location

Houjing is a station on the Red line of Kaohsiung MRT in Nanzih District, Kaohsiung, Taiwan.

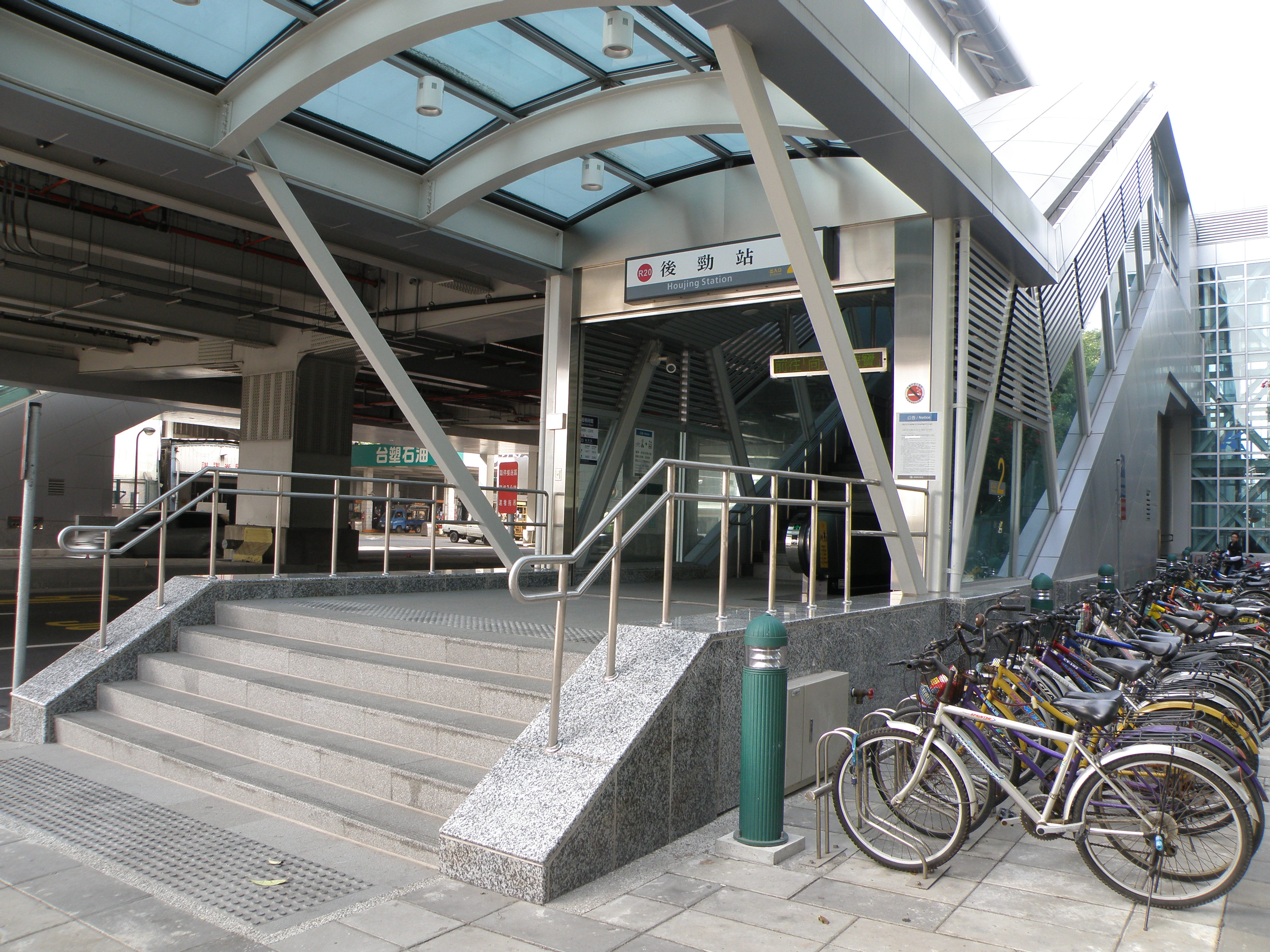
Sidewalk near exit 2 of Houjing station

This is a three-level, elevated station with two side platforms and three exits. It is 153 meters long and is located near the intersection of Jiachang Rd. and Haijhuan Rd.

== Around the station ==
- Houjin River
- National University of Kaohsiung
- National Kaohsiung University of Science and Technology
- Houjing Junior High School
- Houjing Elementary School
