= Nanzih Technology Industrial Park metro station =

Metro station in Kaohsiung, Taiwan

Nanzih Technology Industrial Park R19 楠梓科技園區
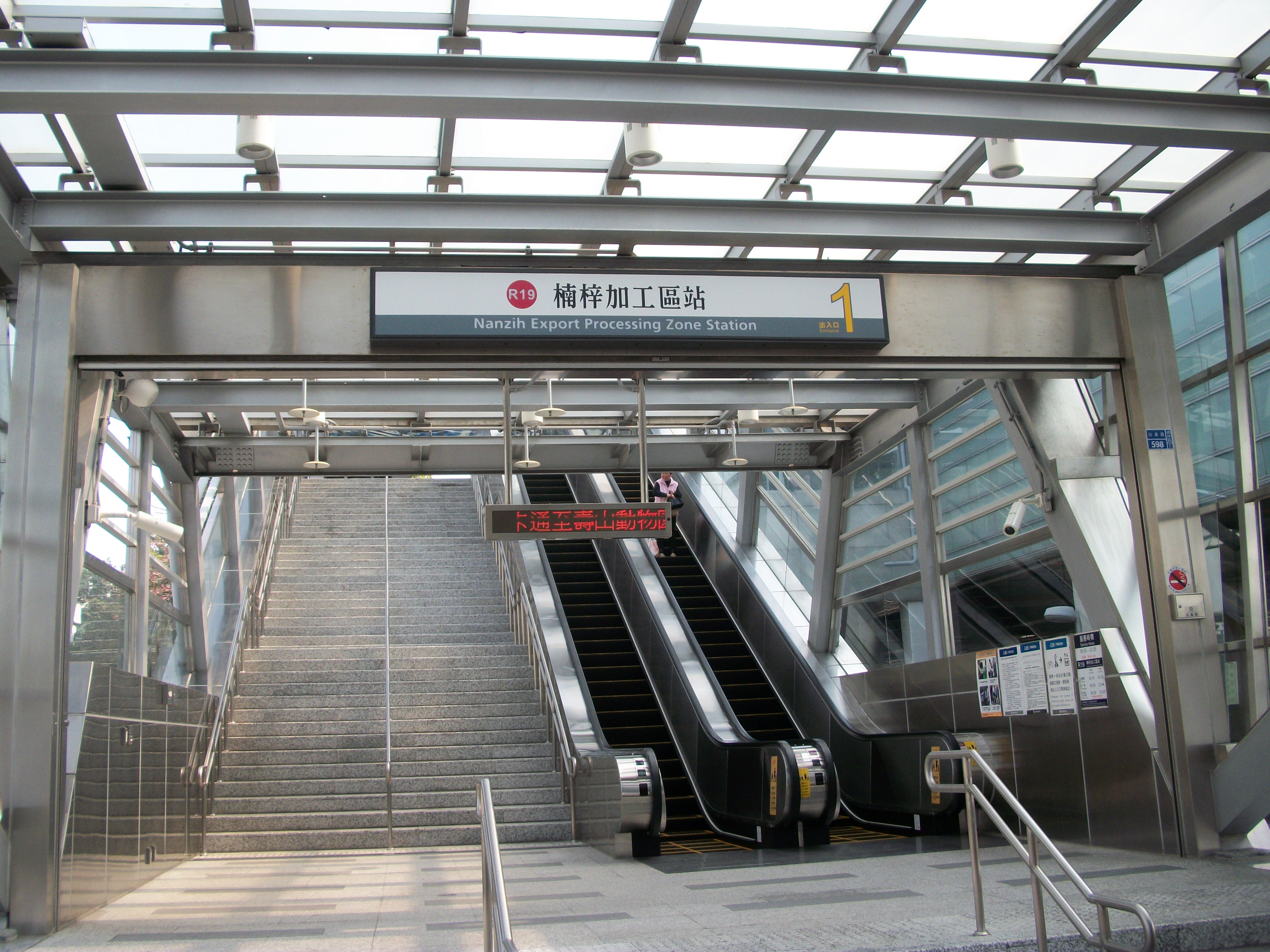
- Nanzih Technology Industrial Park station exit 1

Chinese name
- Traditional Chinese: 楠梓科技園區站
Transcriptions
Standard Mandarin
- Hanyu Pinyin: Nánzǐ Kējìyuánqū Zhàn
- Bopomofo: ㄋㄢˊ ㄗˇ ㄎㄜ ㄐㄧˋ ㄩㄢˊ ㄑㄩ ㄓㄢˋ
- Wade–Giles: Nan^{2}tzu^{3} K'ê^{1}chi^{4}yüan^{2}chu^{1} Chan^{4}
- Tongyong Pinyin: Nánzǐh Kejìyuáncyu Jhàn

General information
- Location: Nanzih, Kaohsiung; Taiwan
- Coordinates: 22°43′08″N 120°18′26″E
- Operated by: Kaohsiung Rapid Transit Corporation
- Line(s): Red line (R19)
- Platforms: One Island platform

Construction
- Structure type: Elevated

History
- Opened: 2008-03-09

Passengers
- 5,520 daily (Jan. 2011)

Services
Preceding station	Kaohsiung Metro	Following station
Houjing towards Gangshan	Red line	Oil Refinery Elementary School towards Siaogang

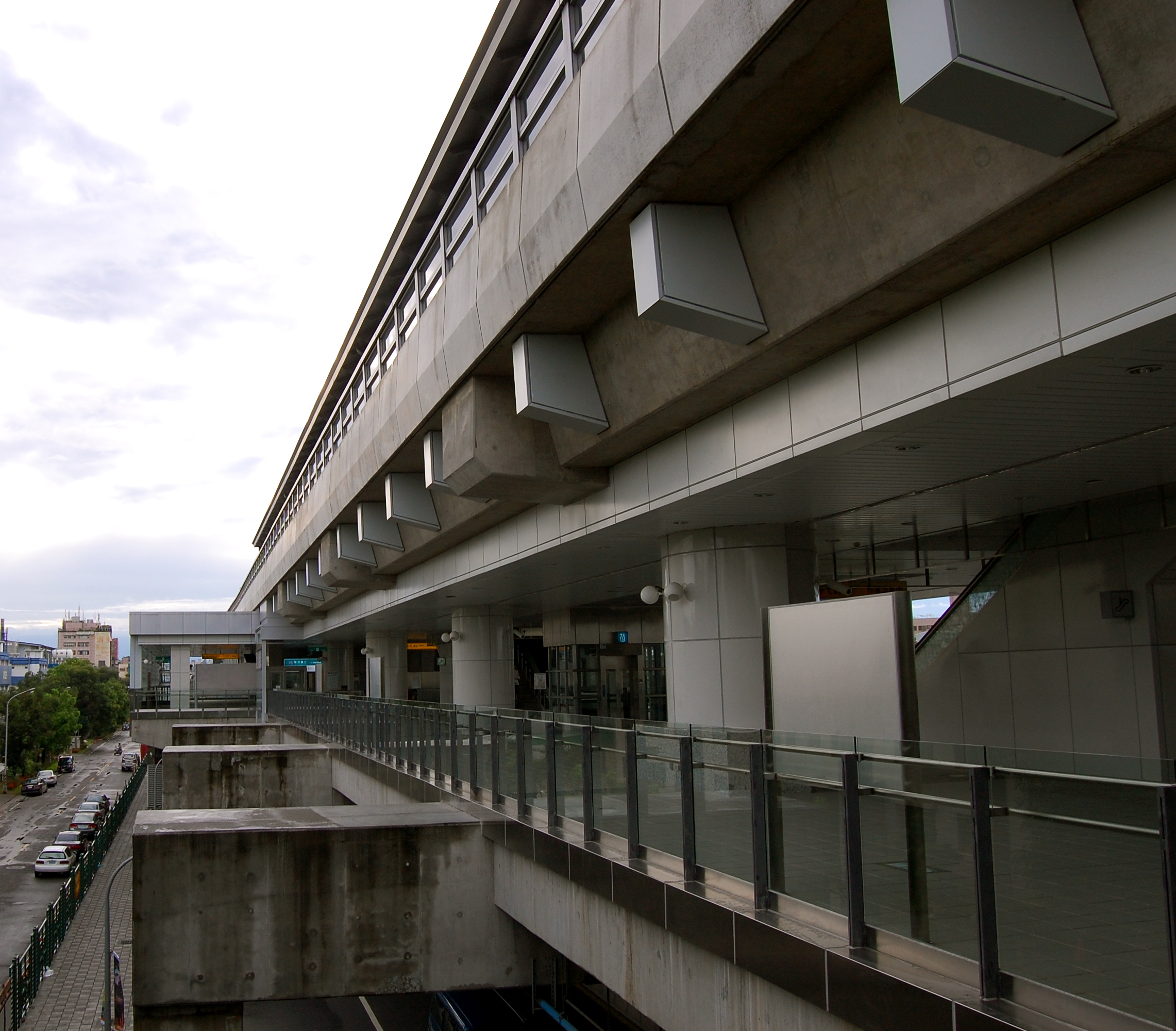
Side view of the Nanzih Technology Industrial Park station concourse

Nanzih Technology Industrial Park is a station on the Red line of Kaohsiung MRT in Nanzih District, Kaohsiung, Taiwan. Formerly Nanzih Export Processing Zone station, it was renamed in 2024.

The station is a three-level, elevated station with one island platforms and six exits. It is 170 meters long and is located on Jiachang Rd. in front of the Nanzih Technology Industrial Park.

== Around the Station ==
- Youchang Forest Park
- Nanzih Technology Industrial Park
- Kaohsiung Refinery dormitory
- Jiachang Rd.
