= Kaohsiung Municipal Nanzih Comprehensive Senior High School =

Kaohsiung Municipal Nanzih Senior High School
- 高雄市立楠梓高級中學
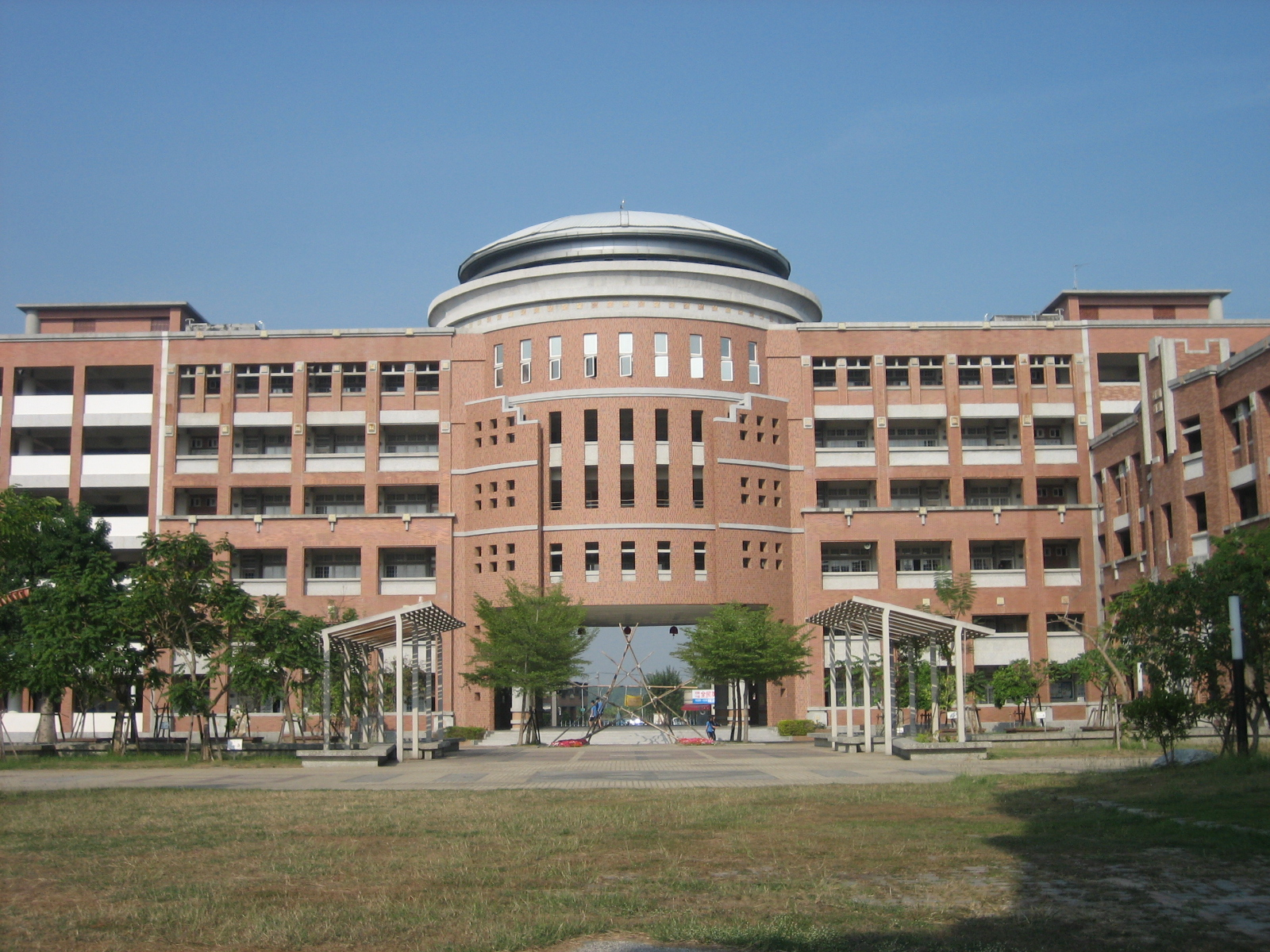

Location
- No.19, Cingfong Road; Nanzih, Kaohsiung 81165; Taiwan
- Coordinates: 22.7434°N 120.3308°E

Information
- School type: Comprehensive Public High School
- Motto: Dynamic / Excellent / Innovation
- Established: March 20, 2003
- Founder: Chuang Lao-tsz (莊老賜)
- Principal: Tsai Ching-po (蔡清波)
- Grades: 9-12
- Campus size: 5.7 hectares (14 acres)
- Campus type: Suburban
- Color
- Newspaper: NTHS Youth (楠高青年)
- Website: www.nths.kh.edu.tw

Kaohsiung Municipal Nanzih Senior High School (NTHS, Chinese: 高雄市立楠梓高級中學) is a comprehensive high school in Kaohsiung, Taiwan. The Kaohsiung City Government planning to set up the first comprehensive high school.

== Departments of Nanzih Senior High School ==
There are six departments:

=== General Education ===
- Dept. of Academic Social Science (學術社會學程)
- Dept. of Academic Natural Science (學術自然學程)

=== Vocational Education ===
- Dept. of Applied English (應用英語學程)
- Dept. of Applied German (應用德語學程) Newly established department in 2011 (Hold delay)
- Dept. of Information Applications (資訊應用學程)
- Dept. of Leisure Management (休閒事務學程)
- Dept. of Visual Communication Design (視覺傳達設計學程) Cease enrollment in 2012

== Spirit of the school ==
- Dynamic / Excellent / Innovation(Chinese: 活力/卓越/創新)
