= Nanzih District =

District in Kaohsiung, Taiwan

Coordinates: 22°43′36.48″N 120°17′51.00″E

Nanzih 楠梓區 Nantzu, Nanshi, Nanzi
- District
- Nanzih District
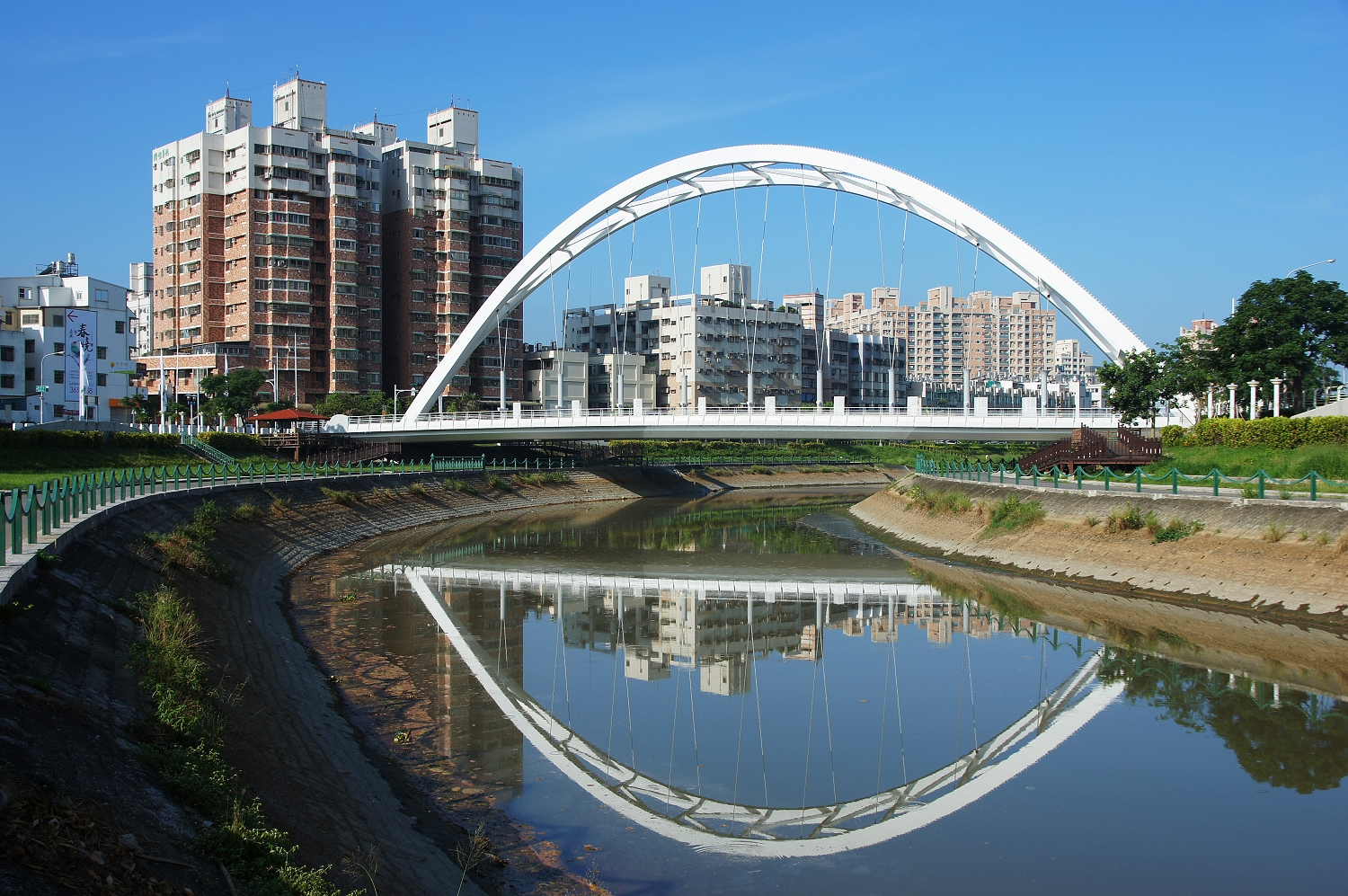

- NANZIH 高雄市楠梓區公所; Nanzih District Office, Kaohsiung City

- Nanzih District in Kaohsiung City
- Country: Taiwan
- Region: Southern Taiwan

Population (October 2023)
  - Total: 192,888
- Website: nanzih.kcg.gov.tw/en/

Nanzih District (also spelled Nanzi; Chinese: 楠梓區; Hanyu Pinyin: Nánzǐ Qū; Tongyong Pinyin: Nánzǐh Cyu; Wade–Giles: Nan^{2}-tzŭ^{3} Ch'ü^{1}) is a district located in Kaohsiung City, Taiwan. It was one of the northernmost districts of Kaohsiung City until Kaohsiung County was merged into the municipality in 2010. Nanzih offers convenient access to transportation, including a train and bus station and an interchange on the Sun Yat-sen Freeway. Moreover, it also contains the Nanzih Industrial Zone.

== Administrative divisions ==
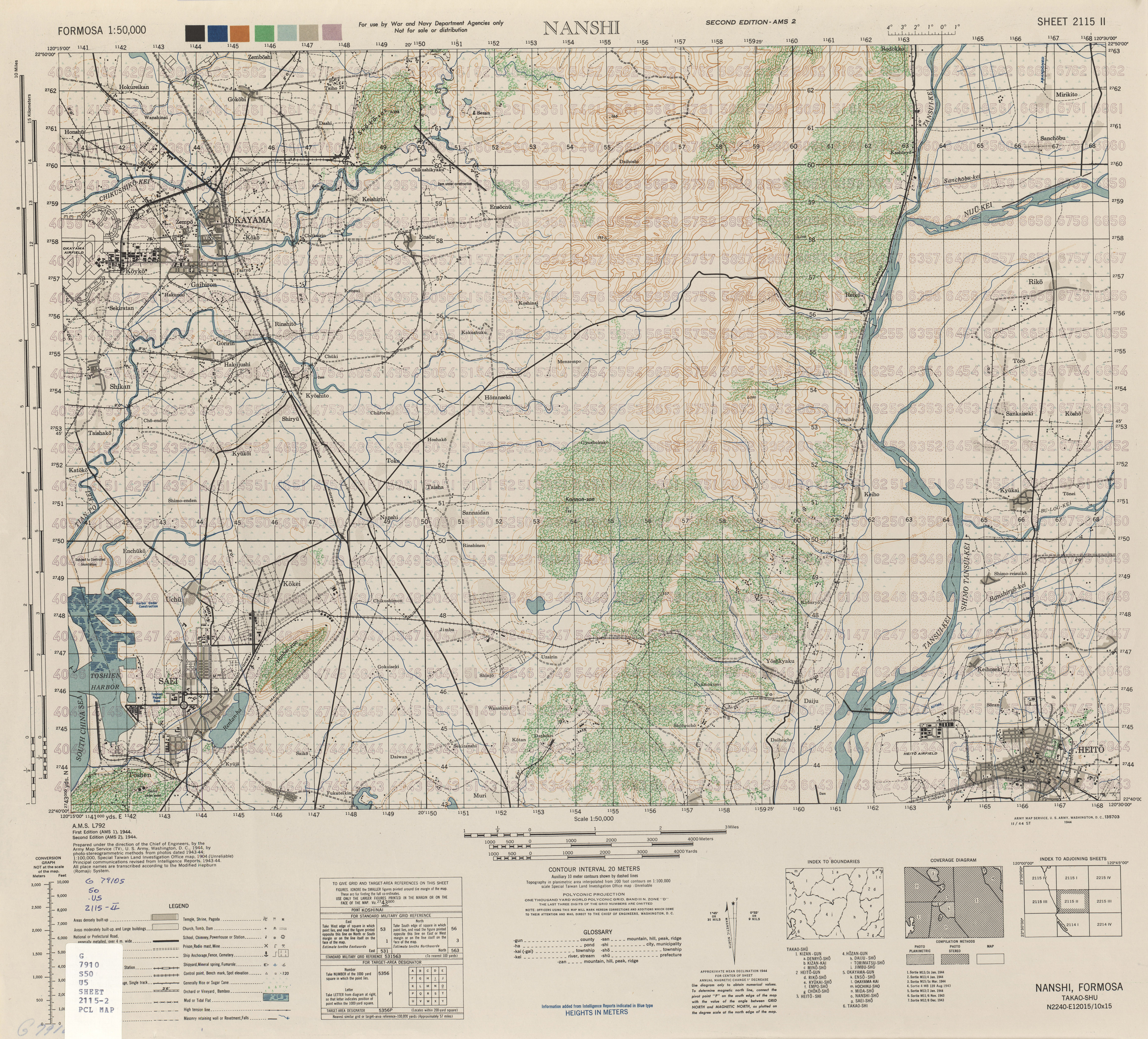
Map of the region including Nanzih (labeled as Nanshi) (1944)

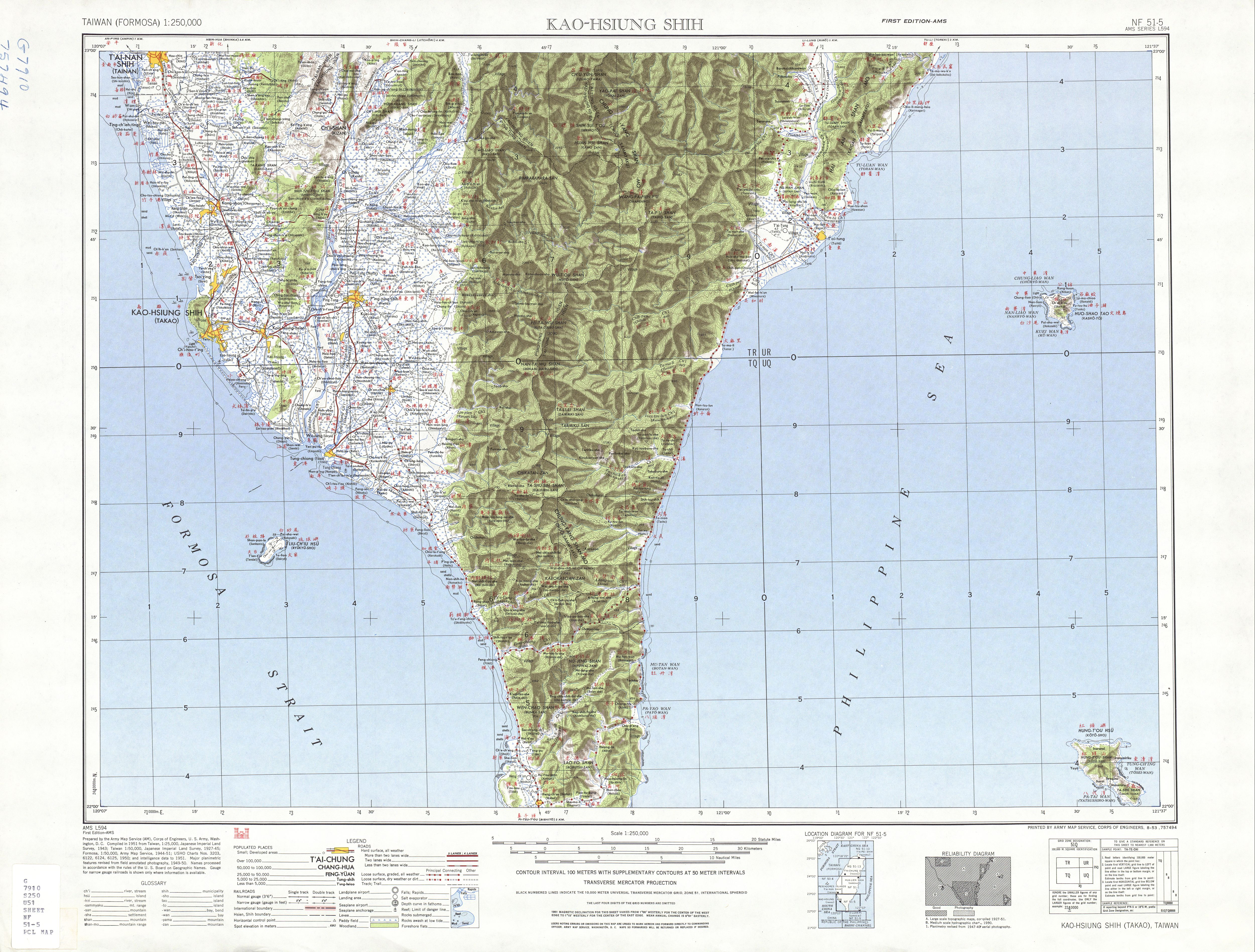
Map of the region including Nanzih (labeled as Nan-tzu-chuang (Nanshishō) 楠梓庄) (1951)

The district consists of Cingfong, Tungning, Wuchang, Siangping, Jhongyang, Hueinan, Hueimin, Hueifong, Jinbing, Yubing, Jintian, Rentian, Rueiping, Cueiping, Hongnan, Hongyi, Hongrong, Guangchang, Jiouchang, Dachang, Fuchang, Chengchang, Taichang, Xingchang, Jianchang, Hongchang, Hechang, Qingchang, Longchang, Siouchang, Yuchang, Guochang, Jiachang, Renchang, Lantian, Jhongsing and Jhonghe Village.

== Education ==
=== Universities ===
- National Kaohsiung University of Science and Technology
- National University of Kaohsiung

=== Schools ===
- Kaohsiung Municipal Nanzih Comprehensive Senior High School

== Tourist attractions ==
- Houjin River
- Kaohsiung Metropolitan Park
- Mount Banping
- Nanzih Tianhou Temple
- Yang Family Historical Residence
- Youchang Forest Park
- Zhongpu Daitian Temple

== Transportation ==
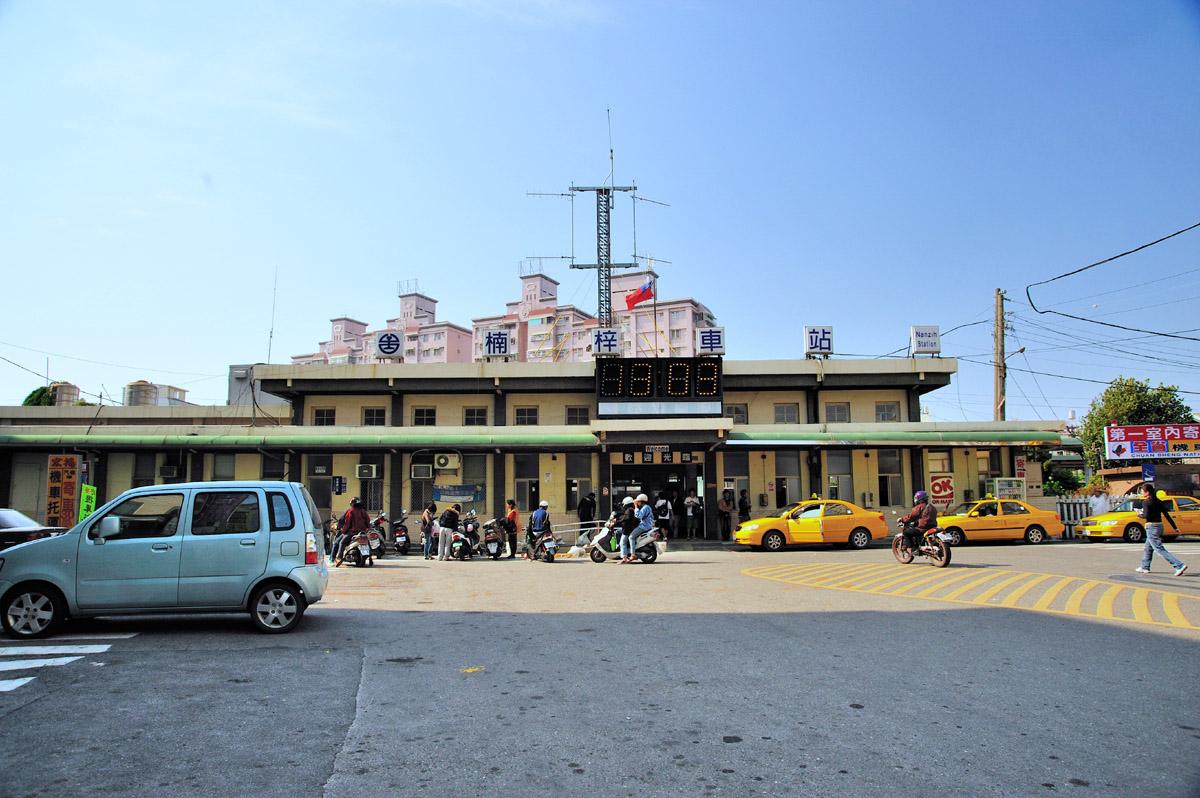
Nanzi Station (formerly Nanzih Station)

=== Railway ===
Taiwan Railway Western Line stations

- Nanzi Station (formerly Nanzih Station)

Kaohsiung Mass Rapid Transit Red Line stations

- Metropolitan Park Station
- Houjing Station
- Nanzih Export Processing Zone Station
- Oil Refinery Elementary School Station
- World Games Station

=== Highway ===
Sun Yat-sen Freeway Nanzi Interchange at 356 km

- Tai 1 line (Gaonan Highway)
- Tai 17 line (Coast Highway)
- Tai 22 line (Qinan Road)

== See also ==
- Administrative divisions of Taiwan
