= Tongyong Pinyin =

Taiwanese romanization for Mandarin (2002–2008)

Tongyong Pinyin 通用拼音; Tong-yòng Pin-yin
- Script type: Alphabet romanization
- Creator: Taiwan Ministry of Education
- Period: Republic of China (2002–2009)
- Direction: Left-to-right
- Languages: Taiwanese Mandarin

Related scripts
- Child systems: Daī-ghî tōng-iōng pīng-im (Taiwanese Hokkien)

Unicode
- Unicode range: Not in Unicode

Chinese name
- Traditional Chinese: 通用拼音
- Literal meaning: General-use sound spelling
Transcriptions
Standard Mandarin
- Hanyu Pinyin: Tōngyòng pīnyīn
- Bopomofo: ㄊㄨㄥ ㄩㄥˋ ㄆㄧㄣ ㄧㄣ
- Wade–Giles: T'ung^{1}-yung^{4} Pin^{1}-yin^{1}
- Tongyong Pinyin: Tong-yòng Pin-yin
- IPA: [tʰʊ́ŋ.jʊ̂ŋ pʰín.ín]
- IETF language tag: zh-Latn-tongyong

Tongyong Pinyin was the official romanization of Mandarin in Taiwan between 2002 and 2008. The system was unofficially used between 2000 and 2002, while a new romanization system for Taiwan was being evaluated for adoption. Taiwan's Ministry of Education approved the system in 2002, but its use was optional.

From 1 January 2009, the Ministry of Education began promoting Hanyu Pinyin. Local governments were not able to get financial aid from the central government if they used Tongyong Pinyin-derived romanizations. However, Tongyong Pinyin has continued in use for the transliteration of some place names and personal names in Taiwan (Republic of China). Some of the romanized names of the districts, subway stations and streets in Kaohsiung, Tainan, Taichung, Yunlin County and other places are derived from Tongyong Pinyin – for example, Cijin District (旗津區, Cíjin Cyu).

== History ==
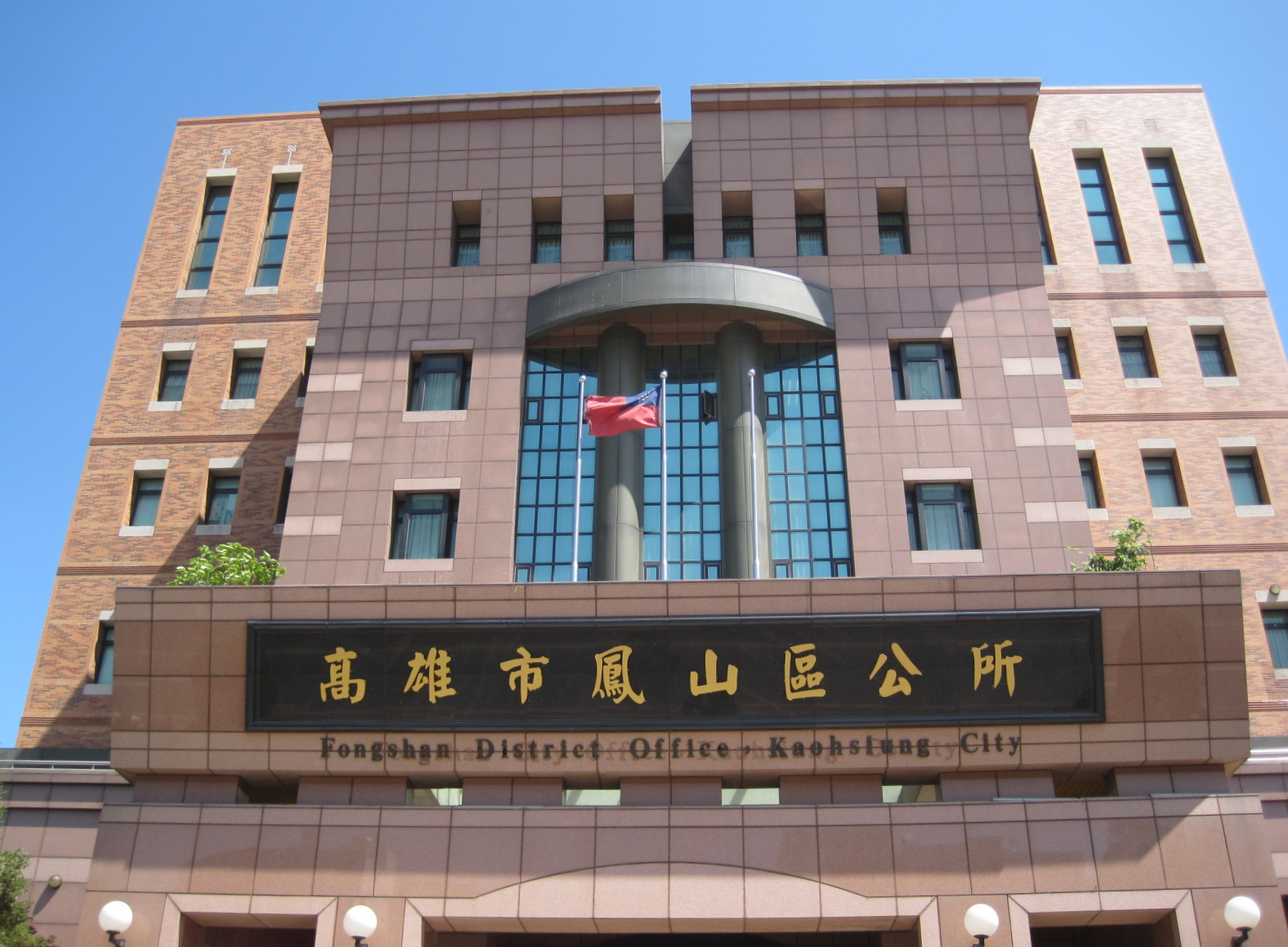
Fongshan District Office, Kaohsiung City (the spelling 'Fongshan' is derived from the Tongyong Pinyin Fòngshan, while the spelling 'Kaohsiung' is derived from Wade–Giles)

The impetus for the invention of Tongyong Pinyin was the need for a standardized romanization system. For decades, the island had employed varying systems, usually simplifications or adaptations of Wade–Giles.

Zhuyin, a standard phonetic system for language education in Taiwan's schools, does not use the Latin alphabet.

Tongyong Pinyin was introduced in 1998 by Yu Bor-chuan to preserve the strengths of Hanyu Pinyin while eliminating some of the pronunciation difficulties Hanyu presents to international readers, such as difficulties with the letters q and x. Yu's system was subsequently revised.

Discussion and adoption of Tongyong Pinyin, like many other initiatives in Taiwan, quickly acquired a partisan tone turning on issues of Chinese versus Taiwanese identity. Officials who identified most strongly with the nation itself, such as the Democratic Progressive Party (DPP) and its allied parties, saw no reason to adopt Hanyu Pinyin just because mainland China and the UN had. If Tongyong Pinyin more adequately met the nation's needs, they saw this as ample justification for Taiwan to adopt it. Officials who identified more strongly with Chinese culture, such as the Kuomintang (KMT), saw no reason to introduce a new system unique to Taiwan if Hanyu Pinyin had already gained international acceptance. Each side accused the other of basing its preference on anti-China or pro-China sentiment rather than an objective discussion of community goals.

In early October 2000, the Mandarin Commission of the Ministry of Education proposed to use Tongyong Pinyin as the national standard. Education Minister Ovid Tzeng submitted a draft of the Taiwanese romanization in late October to the Executive Yuan, but the proposal was rejected. In November 2000, Tzeng unsuccessfully suggested that the government adopt Hanyu Pinyin with some modifications for local dialects. On 10 July 2002, Taiwan's Ministry of Education held a meeting for 27 members. Only 13 attended. Two left early, and since the chairman could not vote, the bill for using Tongyong Pinyin was passed with 10 votes.

In August 2002, the government adopted Tongyong Pinyin by an administrative order that local governments had the authority to override within their jurisdiction. In October 2007, with the DPP administration still in power, it was announced that Taiwan would standardize the English transliterations of its Chinese Mandarin place names by the end of the year, after years of confusion from multiple spellings, by using the locally developed Tongyong Pinyin.

In 2008, the Kuomintang won both the legislative and presidential elections. In September 2008, it was announced that, at the end of the year, Tongyong Pinyin would be replaced by Hanyu Pinyin as Taiwan's standard. Since 1 January 2009, Hanyu Pinyin has been an official romanization system in Taiwan.

However, on 24 August 2020, the Taichung City Council decided to use Tongyong Pinyin in the transliterated names of metro stations on the Green line.

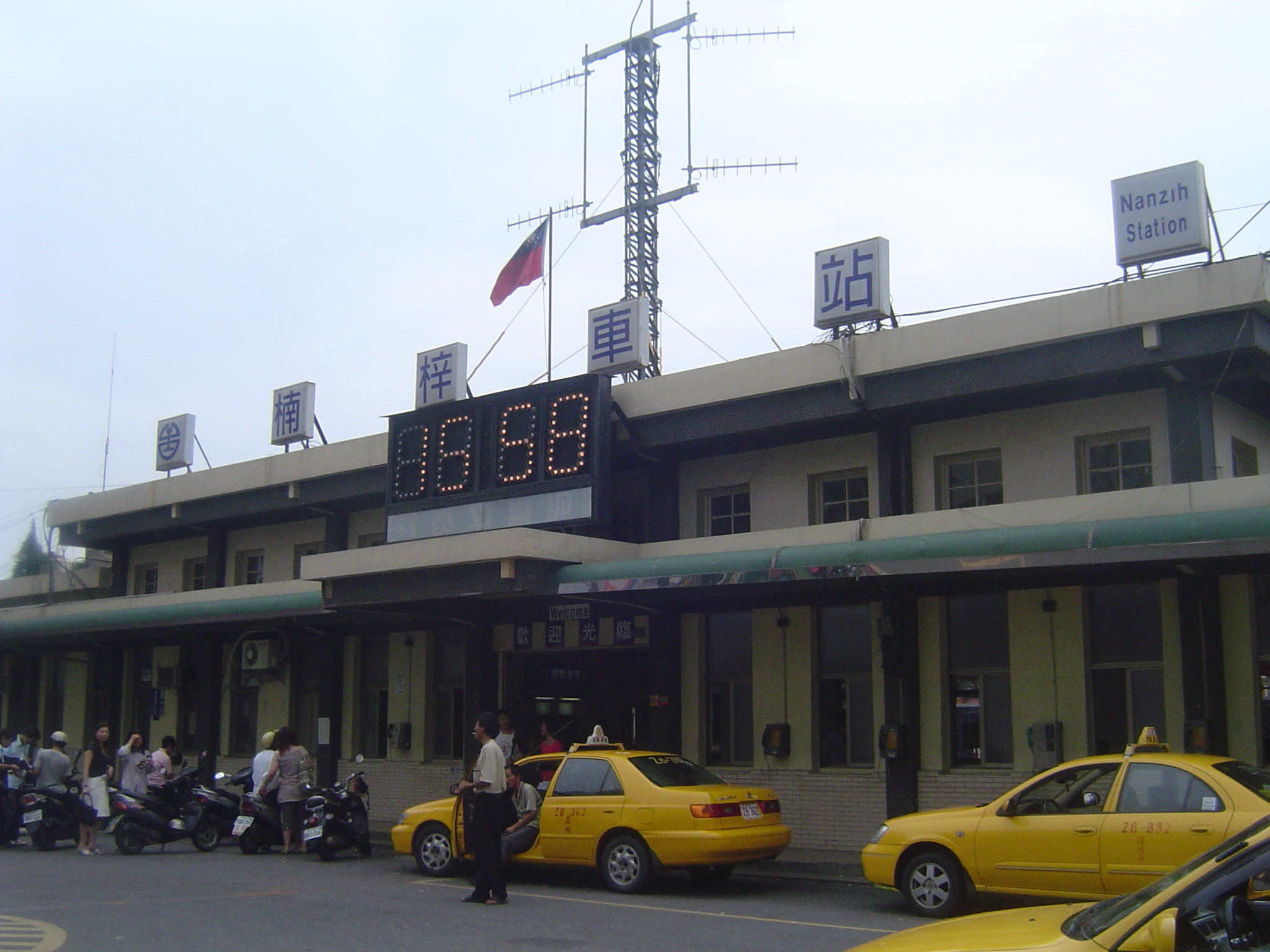
The sign for Nanzi Station formerly read "Nanzih Station"

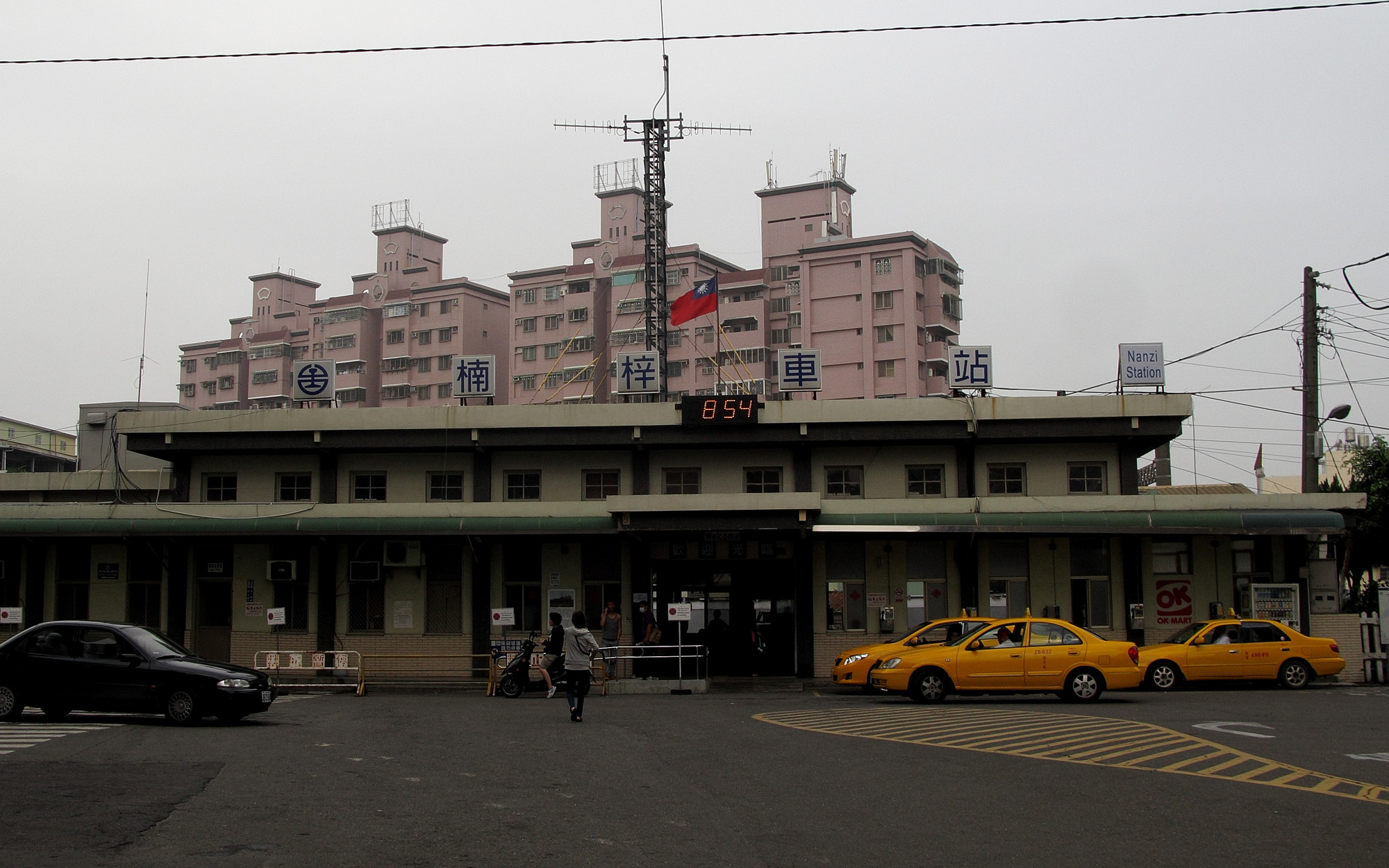
The sign was later changed to read "Nanzi Station". The station serves Nanzih District, Kaohsiung.

== Adoption and use ==
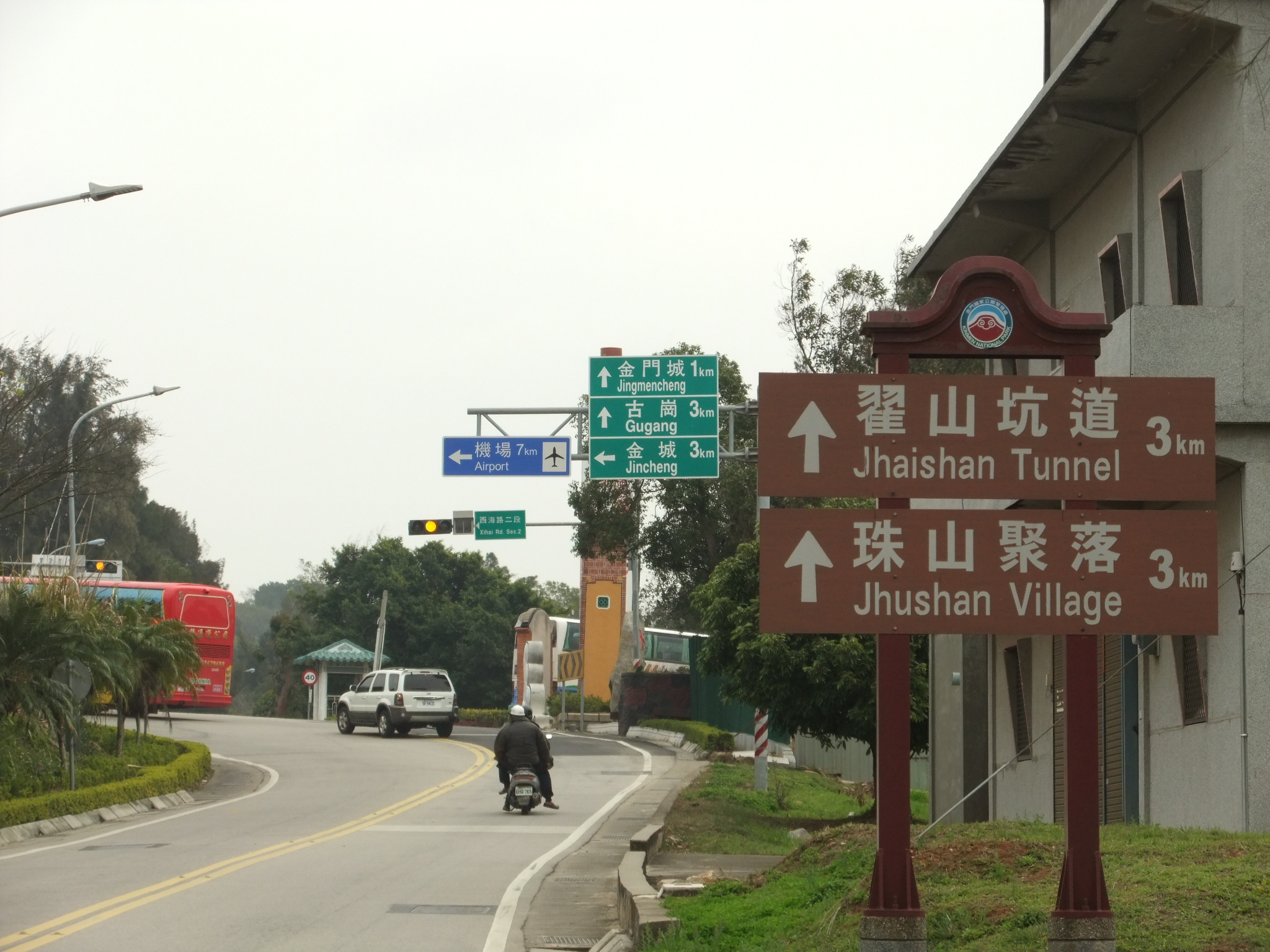
Signs using Tongyong Pinyin (Jhaishan, Jhushan and so on) in Kinmen in 2012. 金 is misspelled as jing (instead of the correct jin) in one of the signs

Tongyong Pinyin was the official romanization system in Taiwan, but its use was voluntary. The romanization system that one encounters in Taiwan varies according to the government authority that administers the facility. Street signs in most areas use Tongyong Pinyin, including the cities of Kaohsiung, Tainan, and surrounding counties. A contrast could be seen in the two entities that now make up the municipality of Taichung–Taichung County used Tongyong Pinyin while Taichung City has used Hanyu Pinyin since at least 2004. Then-mayor Ma Ying-jeou remained committed to using Hanyu Pinyin as the Romanization standard for Taipei. Taipei County (now New Taipei City) used Tongyong Pinyin, but in Taipei Metro stations, Tongyong Pinyin was given in parentheses after Hanyu Pinyin. Modified Wade–Giles spellings are popularly used for many proper names, especially personal names and businesses.

The political impasse prevented Ministry of Education from being able to replace Zhuyin in teaching pronunciation in elementary school. Zhuyin is widely used to teach Mandarin pronunciation to schoolchildren. Children's books published in Taiwan typically display Zhuyin characters next to Chinese characters in the text.

On 17 September 2008, the Ministry of Education announced that the government standard for romanization would be switched to Hanyu Pinyin nationwide, effective 1 January 2009. However, people in Taiwan can freely choose their foreign language names. So although Tongyong Pinyin was effectively scrapped as the romanization standard of Taiwan's central government, many today choose a romanized form of their Chinese character name that is created based on the Tongyong Pinyin, Wade–Giles, or Yale romanization systems.

Today, districts of Kaohsiung are transliterated using Tongyong. Districts of Tainan are mostly named using Tongyong, with exceptions such as Xinying.

== Taiwanese language variant ==
The Tongyong Pinyin system also exists in a Taiwanese Hokkien phonetic symbol version, Daighi tongiong pingim, which lacks f but adds bh. However, in 2006, the Ministry of Education rejected the use of Daighi tongiong pingim for Taiwanese Hokkien and preferred the Taiwanese Romanization System.

== Features ==
=== Spelling ===
Some notable features of Tongyong Pinyin are:

- The first tone is unmarked.
- Hanyu Pinyin's zh- becomes jh- (Wade–Giles uses ch-).
- Hanyu Pinyin's x- and q- are not used in Tongyong Pinyin and become s- and c- (Wade–Giles uses hs- and ch'-).
- The Hanyu Pinyin -i (not represented in Zhuyin) known as the empty rhyme (空韻), are shown as -ih (somewhat like Wade–Giles): those in Hanyu Pinyin as zi (資), ci (慈), si (思), zhi (知), chi (吃), shi (詩), and ri (日) all end in -ih in Tongyong Pinyin.

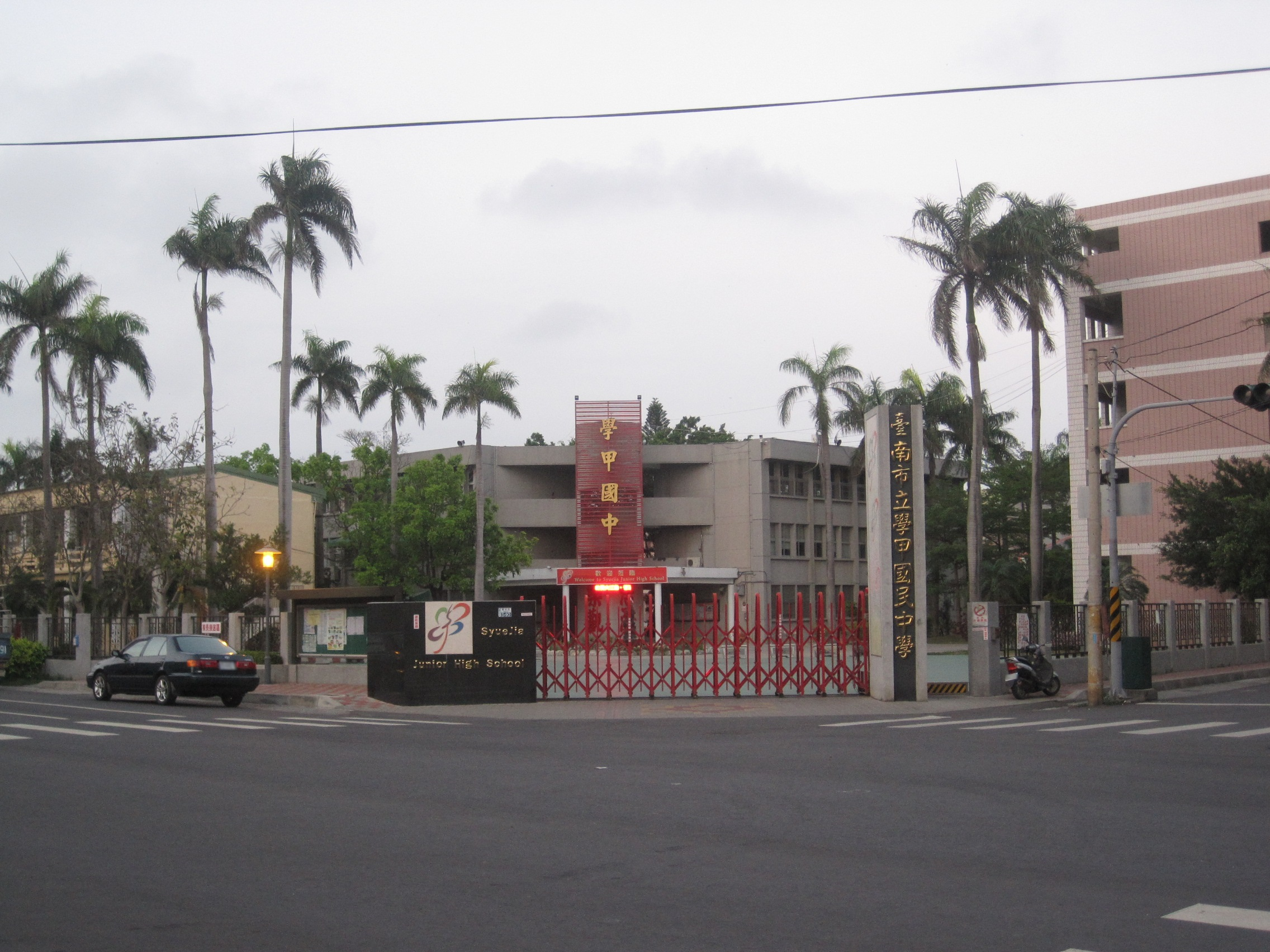
Syuejia/SyueJia Junior High School, Syuejia District, Tainan, Taiwan (the spelling 'Syuejia' is derived from the Tongyong Pinyin Syuéjiǎ.)

- ü used in Hanyu Pinyin (written u after j, q and x) is replaced by yu.

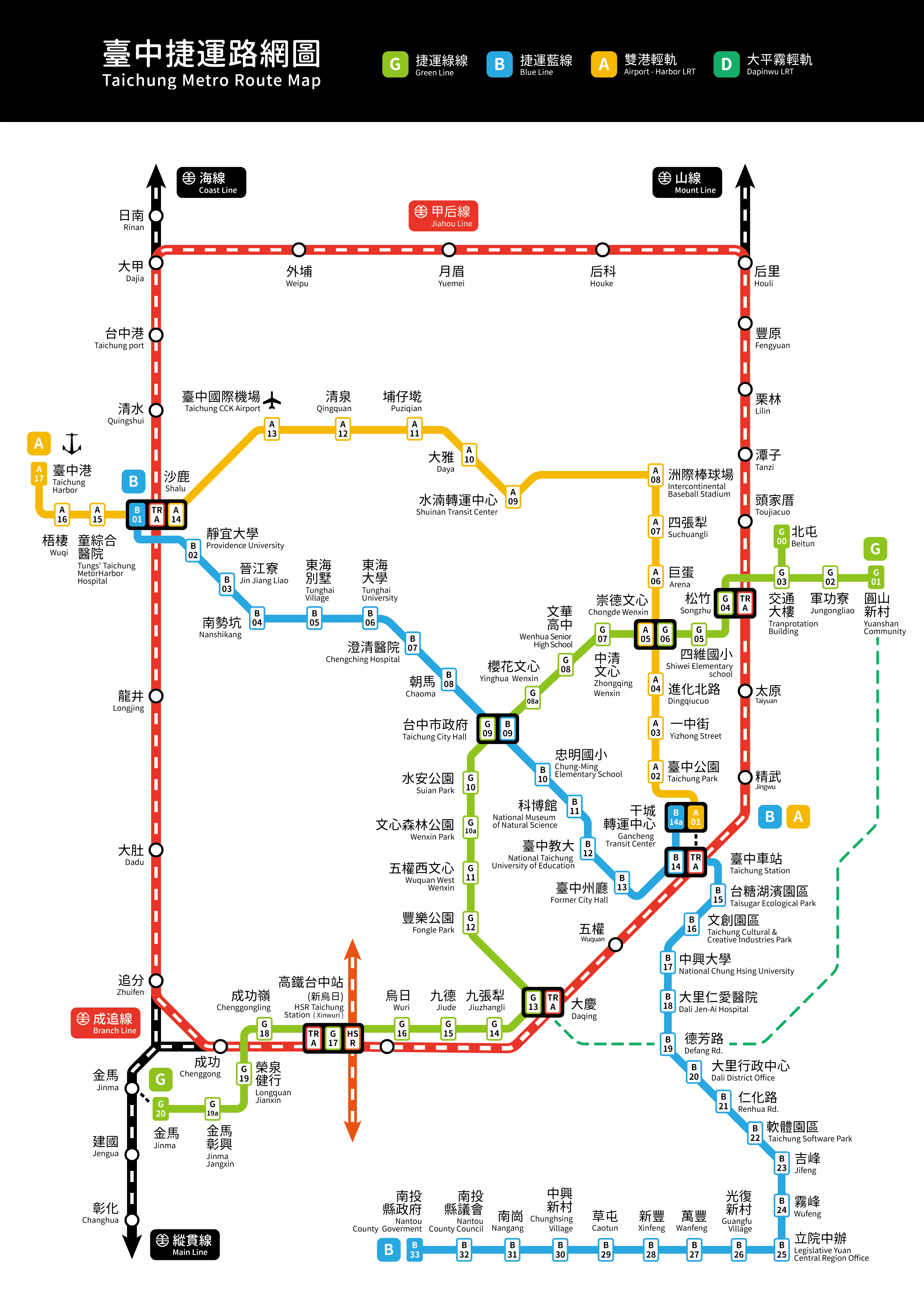
Taichung MRT includes a station at Fongle Park (from Tongyong Pinyin Fonglè)

- -eng becomes ong after f- and w- (奉、瓮).
- wen (溫) becomes wun.
- -iong becomes yong: syong instead of pinyin xiong (兇) (cf. -iang remains unchanged: siang).
- Unlike in Wade–Giles and Hanyu Pinyin, -iu and -ui (liu [六] and gui [鬼]), contractions can be written out in full as -iou and -uei. According to the Ministry of the Interior, in romanizations of names of places that is at township-level or below township-level, the letters must be written in full.

=== Punctuation ===
- Tongyong syllables in the same word (except placenames) are to be separated by hyphens, like Wade–Giles, but in the Ministry of the Interior's romanizations, placenames have no spaces between the syllables.
- Tongyong uses tone closer to those used in Zhuyin, than Hanyu Pinyin: it has no mark for the first tone, but uses a small ring for the neutral tone (optional on computers).

=== Shared features with Hanyu Pinyin ===
If tone is ignored, 19.47% of Tongyong Pinyin syllables are spelled differently to those of Hanyu Pinyin. The difference widens when syllables are measured according to average frequency of use in everyday life to a 48.84% difference in spellings. In two cases (si and ci) the same Latin spelling denotes different syllables depending on the transcription system.

== Arguments ==
The prevalence of Hanyu Pinyin as an established system weighs at least as heavily on the debate over Tongyong Pinyin as any feature of the system itself. There are many arguments for the use of each. Some factors cited in support of Tongyong Pinyin include the following.

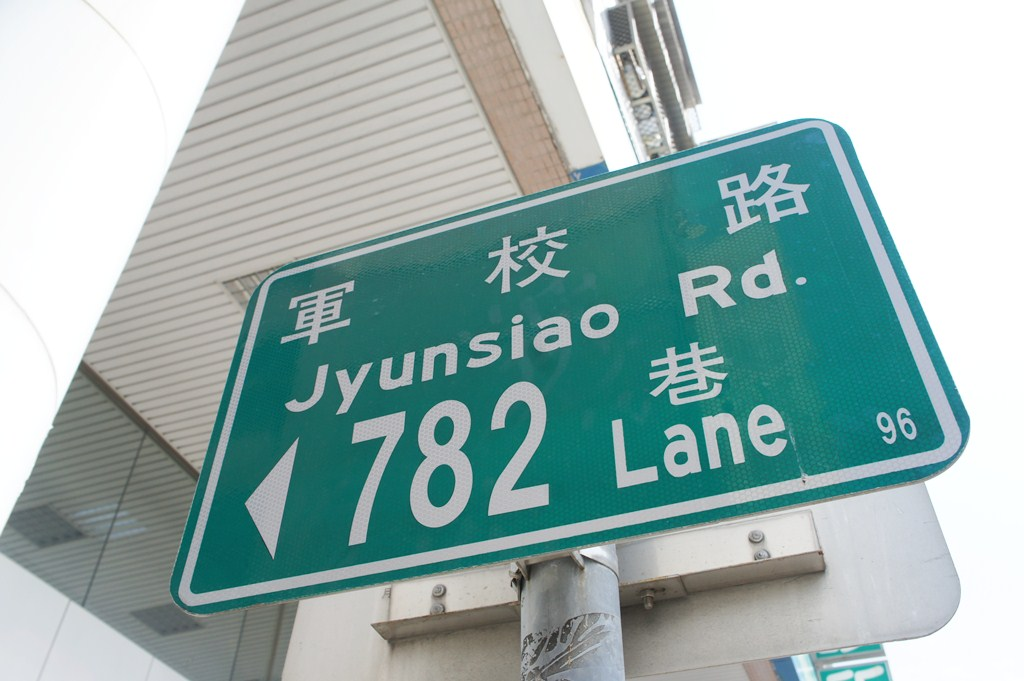
Road sign in Nanzih District, Kaohsiung in which 軍校路 (Hanyu Pinyin: jūnxiào lù) is written as 'Jyunsiao Rd.', based on the Tongyong Pinyin form jyunsiào lù.

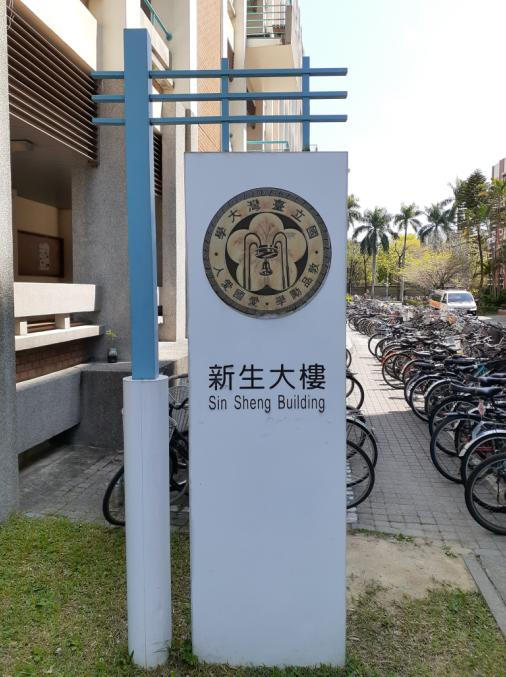
Sign at National Taiwan University in Taipei, Taiwan in which 新生大樓 (Hanyu Pinyin: xīnshēng dàlóu) is written as 'Sin Sheng Building', based on the Tongyong Pinyin form sinsheng dàlóu.

- Tongyong Pinyin is business-friendly because of the ease it offers in pronunciation. Visitors to Taiwan can thus more easily describe and find place names, personal names, businesses and locales.
- Tongyong Pinyin requires no more special accommodation in international correspondence than the difference in Chinese characters (simplified vs. traditional) already requires.
- Tongyong strikes a balance between the need for internationalization and Taiwan's local needs.
- Tongyong Pinyin would not supplant Hanyu Pinyin in Taiwan, as Hanyu Pinyin is rarely encountered outside the Taipei area anyway and has never been in common use. Tongyong Pinyin is intended to supplant the many variants of Wade–Giles that remain the dominant form of romanization encountered in Taiwan. No one questions the superiority of Tongyong Pinyin to Wade–Giles and the benefit to be gained from the change.
- Tongyong does not force its exclusive use on those who have already studied Hanyu Pinyin. One can use any system to render characters while one types or formats documents in Mandarin. Computers and electronic devices in Taiwan already offer Hanyu Pinyin and MPS keyboards as options. Transitions between romanized forms are also easily achieved if needed.
- Romanization is most useful to individuals who lack training in Mandarin but encounter names and terms in press reports and literature. Students of Mandarin gain literacy in Chinese characters and drop romanization systems of any kind.

Some argue against the system. The reasons they cite include:

- The standard romanization system of mainland China, the International Organization for Standardization, and the United Nations is Hanyu Pinyin.
- Tongyong Pinyin creates a third form of spelling/transliteration, adding complexity. For example, "Qing dynasty" (via Hanyu Pinyin) and "Ch'ing dynasty" (via Wade–Giles) is spelled as "Cing dynasty" (via Tongyong Pinyin). Persons doing research on this time period thus would need to know that all three terms in fact refer to the same dynasty.

== Comparison with other orthographies ==
The differences between Tongyong Pinyin and Hanyu Pinyin are relatively straightforward:

- The palatalized consonant series is j, c, s rather than j, q, x.
- The retroflex consonants are jh, ch, sh rather than zh, ch, sh.
- The "buzzing" vowels are written ih (shih, sih) rather than i (shi, si).
- Yu and yong are still spelled with a 'y' even after a consonant (nyu, jyong), rather than as ü, u, or iong.
- You and wei are written iou and uei after a consonant (diou, duei), rather than contracted to iu and ui.
- Eng is written labialized ong after the labial consonants f, w (fong, wong), but weng/wong contracts to ong after another consonant in both systems.
- Wen becomes wun.
- Neutral tone is marked, but not first tone.

Vowels a, e, o
IPA	a	ɔ	ɛ	ɤ	ai	ei	au	ou	an	ən	aŋ	əŋ	ʊŋ	aɹ
Pinyin	a	o	ê	e	ai	ei	ao	ou	an	en	ang	eng	ong	er
Tongyong Pinyin	a	o	ê	e	ai	ei	ao	ou	an	en	ang	eng	ong	er
Wade–Giles	a	o	eh	ê/o	ai	ei	ao	ou	an	ên	ang	êng	ung	êrh
Bopomofo	ㄚ	ㄛ	ㄝ	ㄜ	ㄞ	ㄟ	ㄠ	ㄡ	ㄢ	ㄣ	ㄤ	ㄥ	ㄨㄥ	ㄦ
example	阿	喔	誒	俄	艾	黑	凹	偶	安	恩	昂	冷	中	二

Vowels i, u, y
IPA	i	je	jou	jɛn	in	iŋ	jʊŋ	u	wo	wei	wən	wəŋ	y	ɥe	ɥɛn	yn
Pinyin	yi	ye	you	yan	yin	ying	yong	wu	wo/o	wei	wen	weng	yu	yue	yuan	yun
Tongyong Pinyin	yi	ye	you	yan	yin	ying	yong	wu	wo/o	wei	wun	wong	yu	yue	yuan	yun
Wade–Giles	i/yi	yeh	yu	yen	yin	ying	yung	wu	wo/o	wei	wên	wêng	yü	yüeh	yüan	yün
Bopomofo	ㄧ	ㄧㄝ	ㄧㄡ	ㄧㄢ	ㄧㄣ	ㄧㄥ	ㄩㄥ	ㄨ	ㄨㄛ/ㄛ	ㄨㄟ	ㄨㄣ	ㄨㄥ	ㄩ	ㄩㄝ	ㄩㄢ	ㄩㄣ
example	一	也	又	言	音	英	用	五	我	位	文	翁	玉	月	元	雲

Non-sibilant consonants
IPA	p	pʰ	m	fəŋ	tjou	twei	twən	tʰɤ	ny	ly	kɤ	kʰɤ	xɤ
Pinyin	b	p	m	feng	diu	dui	dun	te	nü	lü	ge	ke	he
Tongyong Pinyin	b	p	m	fong	diou	duei	dun	te	nyu	lyu	ge	ke	he
Wade–Giles	p	pʻ	m	fêng	tiu	tui	tun	tʻê	nü	lü	ko	kʻo	ho
Bopomofo	ㄅ	ㄆ	ㄇ	ㄈㄥ	ㄉㄧㄡ	ㄉㄨㄟ	ㄉㄨㄣ	ㄊㄜ	ㄋㄩ	ㄌㄩ	ㄍㄜ	ㄎㄜ	ㄏㄜ
example	玻	婆	末	封	丟	兌	頓	特	女	旅	歌	可	何

Sibilant consonants
IPA	tɕjɛn	tɕjʊŋ	tɕʰin	ɕɥɛn	ʈʂɤ	ʈʂɨ	ʈʂʰɤ	ʈʂʰɨ	ʂɤ	ʂɨ	ɻɤ	ɻɨ	tsɤ	tswo	tsɨ	tsʰɤ	tsʰwo	tsʰɨ	sɤ	swo	sɨ
Pinyin	jian	jiong	qin	xuan	zhe	zhi	che	chi	she	shi	re	ri	ze	zuo	zi	ce	cuo	ci	se	suo	si
Tongyong Pinyin	jian	jyong	cin	syuan	jhe	jhih	che	chih	she	shih	re	rih	ze	zuo	zih	ce	cuo	cih	se	suo	sih
Wade–Giles	chien	chiung	chʻin	hsüan	chê	chih	chʻê	chʻih	shê	shih	jê	jih	tsê	tso	tzŭ	tsʻê	tsʻo	tzʻŭ	sê	so	ssŭ
Bopomofo	ㄐㄧㄢ	ㄐㄩㄥ	ㄑㄧㄣ	ㄒㄩㄢ	ㄓㄜ	ㄓ	ㄔㄜ	ㄔ	ㄕㄜ	ㄕ	ㄖㄜ	ㄖ	ㄗㄜ	ㄗㄨㄛ	ㄗ	ㄘㄜ	ㄘㄨㄛ	ㄘ	ㄙㄜ	ㄙㄨㄛ	ㄙ
example	件	囧	秦	宣	哲	之	扯	赤	社	是	惹	日	仄	左	字	策	撮	次	色	索	斯

Tones
IPA	ma˥	ma˧˥	ma˨˩˦	ma˥˩	ma
Pinyin	mā	má	mǎ	mà	ma
Tongyong Pinyin	ma	má	mǎ	mà	må
Wade–Giles	ma^{1}	ma^{2}	ma^{3}	ma^{4}	ma
Bopomofo	ㄇㄚ	ㄇㄚˊ	ㄇㄚˇ	ㄇㄚˋ	˙ㄇㄚ
example (Chinese characters)	媽	麻	馬	罵	嗎

== Gallery ==
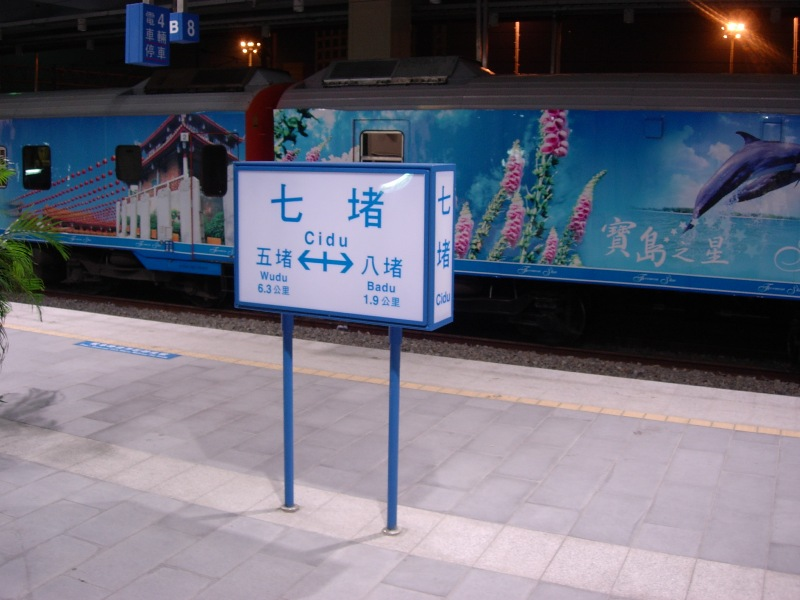

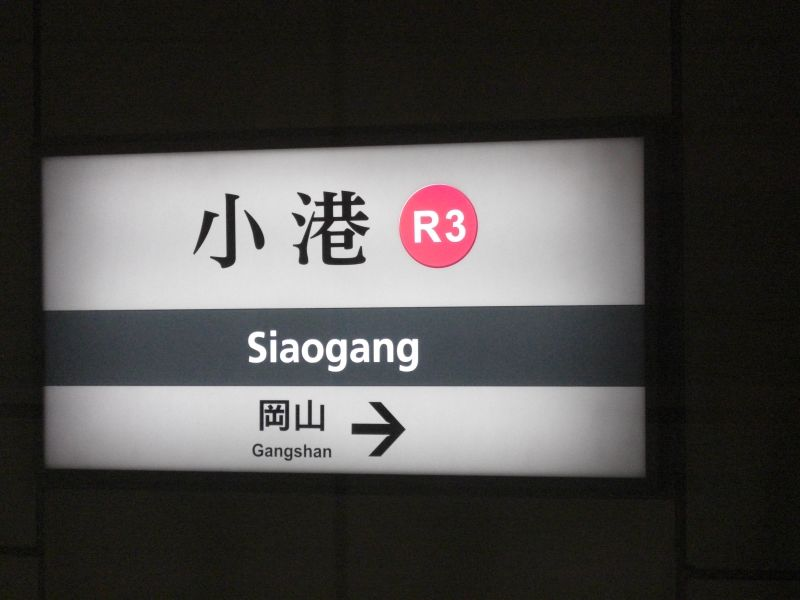

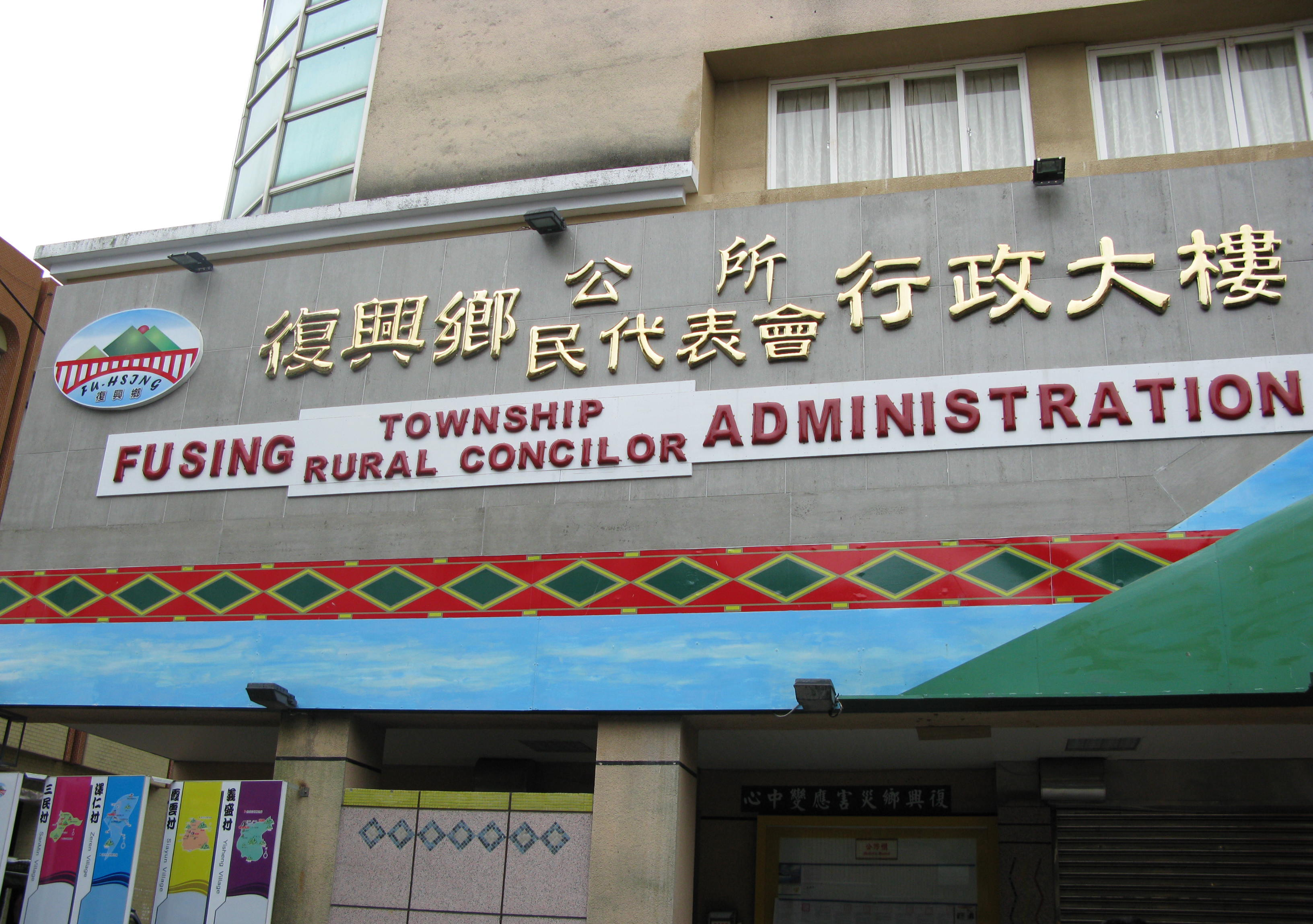

== See also ==
- Hanyu Pinyin
- Daighi tongiong pingim (DT in Taiwanese; 閩南語通用拼音)

Preceded by Mandarin Phonetic Symbols II	Official romanization adopted by Taiwan (Republic of China); 2002–2008	Succeeded by Hanyu Pinyin
