= Youchang Forest Park =

Urban park in Nanzi, Kaohsiung, Taiwan

- 右昌森林公園
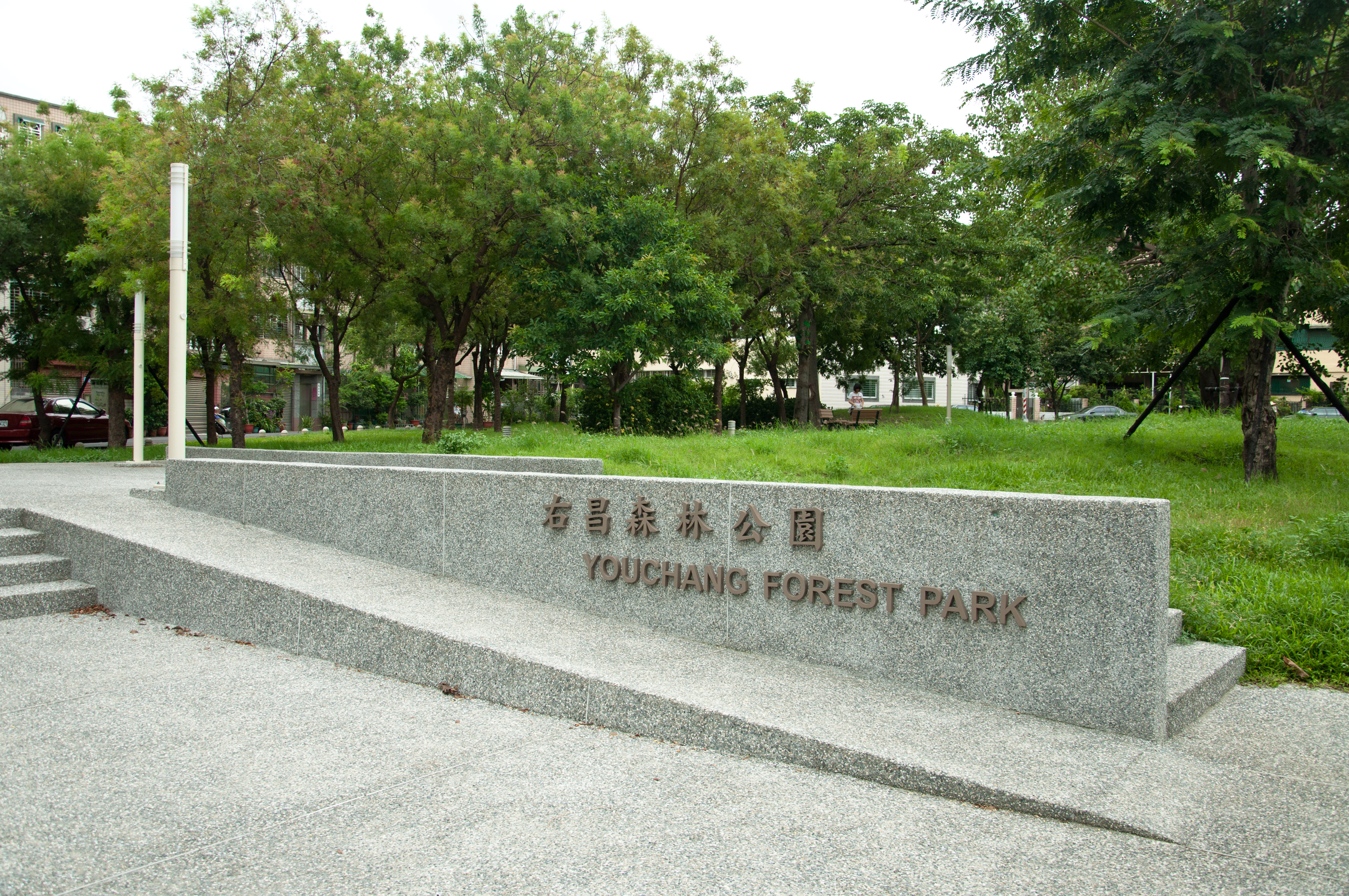
- Interactive map of Youchang Forest Park
- Type: urban park
- Location: Nanzih, Kaohsiung, Taiwan
- Coordinates: 22°43′11.4″N 120°17′37.4″E
- Area: 5 hectares (12 acres)
- Established: 30 December 1982
- Public transit: Nanzih Export Processing Zone Station

The Youchang Forest Park (traditional Chinese: 右昌森林公園; simplified Chinese: 右昌森林公园; pinyin: Yòuchāng Sēnlín Gōngyuán) is an urban park in Nanzih District, Kaohsiung, Taiwan.

== History ==
The park used to be a graveyard. On 30 December 1982, it was turned into the Youchang Forest Park.

== Architecture ==
The park covers an area of around 17 hectares. It has multi-functional grasslands, water areas and an amphitheater.

== Transportation ==
The park is accessible within walking distance west from Nanzih Export Processing Zone Station of Kaohsiung MRT.

== See also ==
- List of parks in Taiwan
