= Nanzi railway station =

Railway station in Nanzi, Kaohsiung, Taiwan

Nanzi Station 楠梓車站
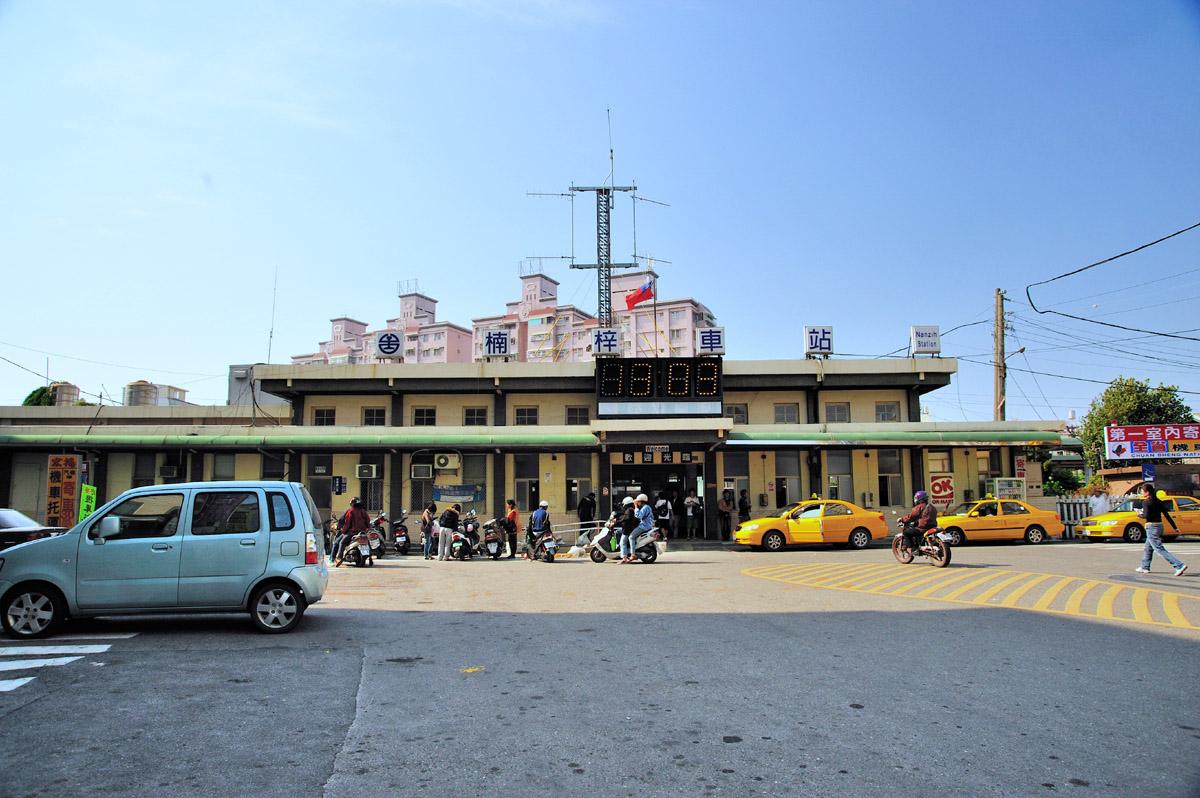

General information
- Location: Nanzih, Kaohsiung, Taiwan
- Coordinates: 22.727082°N 120.324255°E
- System: Train station
- Owner: Taiwan Railway Corporation
- Operator: Taiwan Railway Corporation
- Line: West Coast
- Train operators: Taiwan Railway Corporation

History
- Opened: 29 November 1900

Passengers
- 4,691 daily (2024)
Location
- Location within Taiwan

Nanzi Station (traditional Chinese: 楠梓車站; simplified Chinese: 楠梓车站; pinyin: Nánzǐ Chēzhàn) (formerly Nanzih Station) is a railway station on Taiwan Railway West Coast line located in Nanzih District, Kaohsiung, Taiwan.

== Around the station ==
- Kaohsiung Metro Metropolitan Park Station

== History ==
The railway station was opened on 29 November 1900.

== See also ==
- List of railway stations in Taiwan

Preceding station	Taiwan Railway	Following station
Qiaotou towards Keelung	Western Trunk line	Xinzuoying towards Pingtung
