= Joy Plaza =

Shopping mall in Sanmin, Kaohsiung, Taiwan

- 悅誠廣場

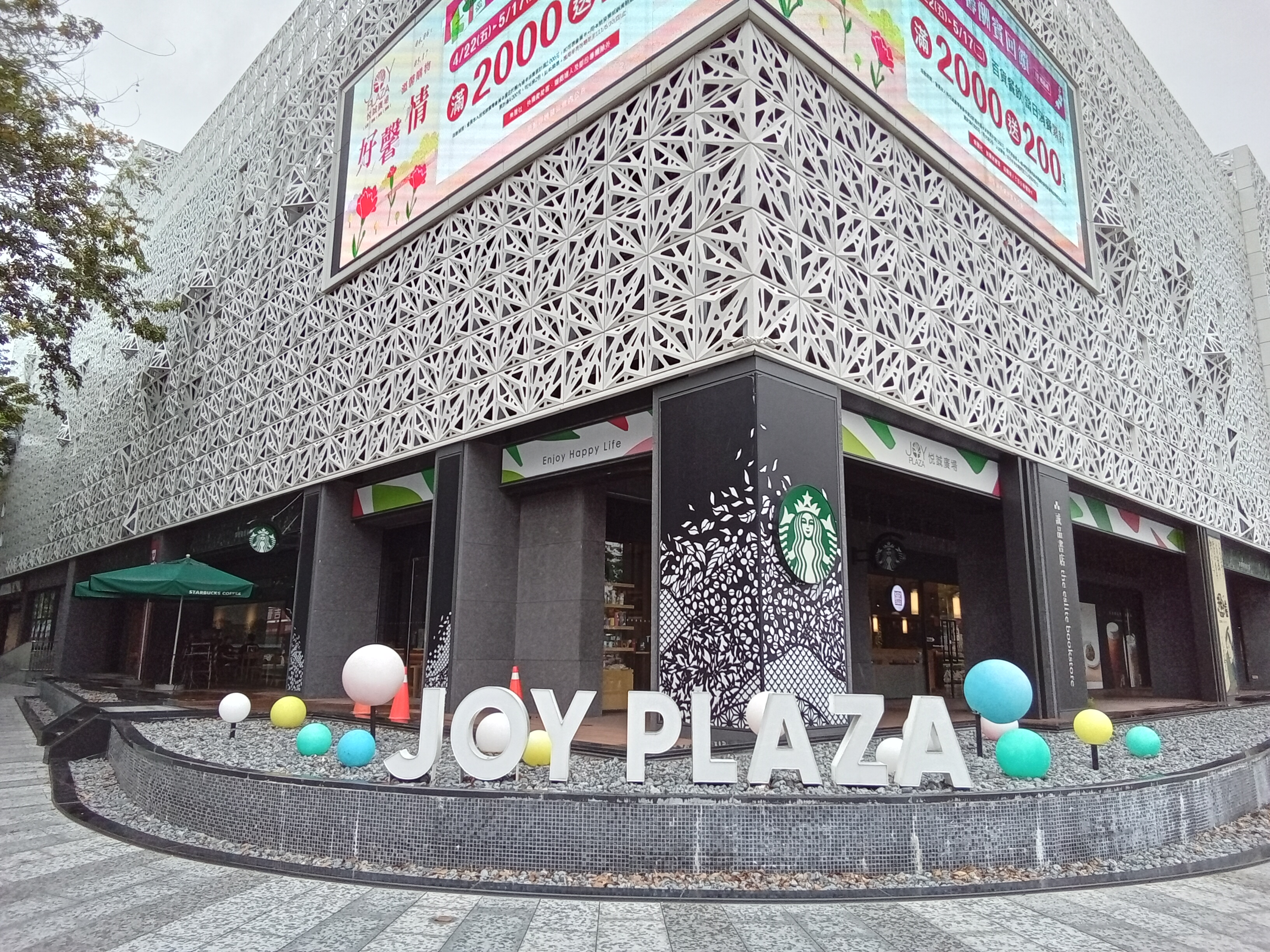
- Location: No. 427, Minzu 1st Road, Sanmin District, Kaohsiung, Taiwan
- Coordinates: 22°39′24″N 120°18′55″E
- Opened: 3 July 2019
- Closed: 31 August 2022
- Num. of stores: 120
- Floors: 3 floors above ground 2 floors below ground
- Public transit: Aozihdi metro station
- Website: https://www.joyplaza.com.tw/

Joy Plaza (Chinese: 悅誠廣場) was a shopping center located in Sanmin District, Kaohsiung, Taiwan. The mall started trial operation on 5 June 2019, and officially opened on 3 July 2019. With a total floor area of 38,940 m^{2} (419,100 sq ft), the mall houses 120 stores, in which the catering industry accounts for 40%. The main core stores are Eslite Life, Toys R Us and various themed restaurants. The annual revenue target for the first year is NT$ 1.5 billion. On August 31, 2022, due to impact of the COVID-19 pandemic, the entire Joy Plaza was closed down.

== Facilities ==
The overall space design of the mall is designed by a Japanese team, mainly composed of wood and planting. In the atrium of the entrance hall of Minzu Road, natural light is introduced into the building by a 100 m (330 ft)-long arch-shaped transparent lighting cover; beside the escalator, there are theater-style seating seats and a 15 m (49 ft)-high large book wall with a total of 40,000 books for reading in the mall. The surrounding trails and green plants extend all the way to the outdoor hiking area.

== Gallery ==
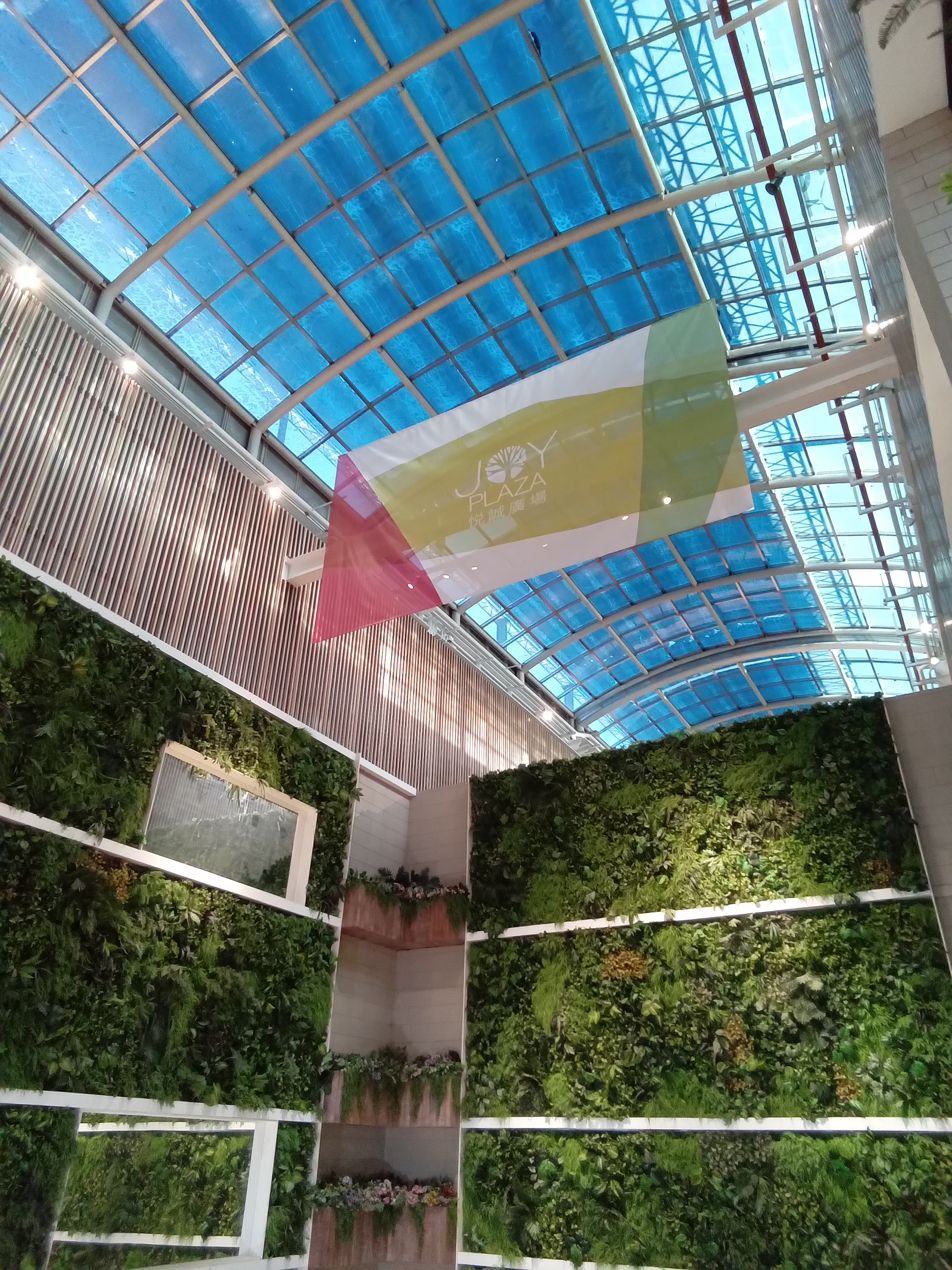
Up to 100 Meters of Arched Transparent Lighting Cover

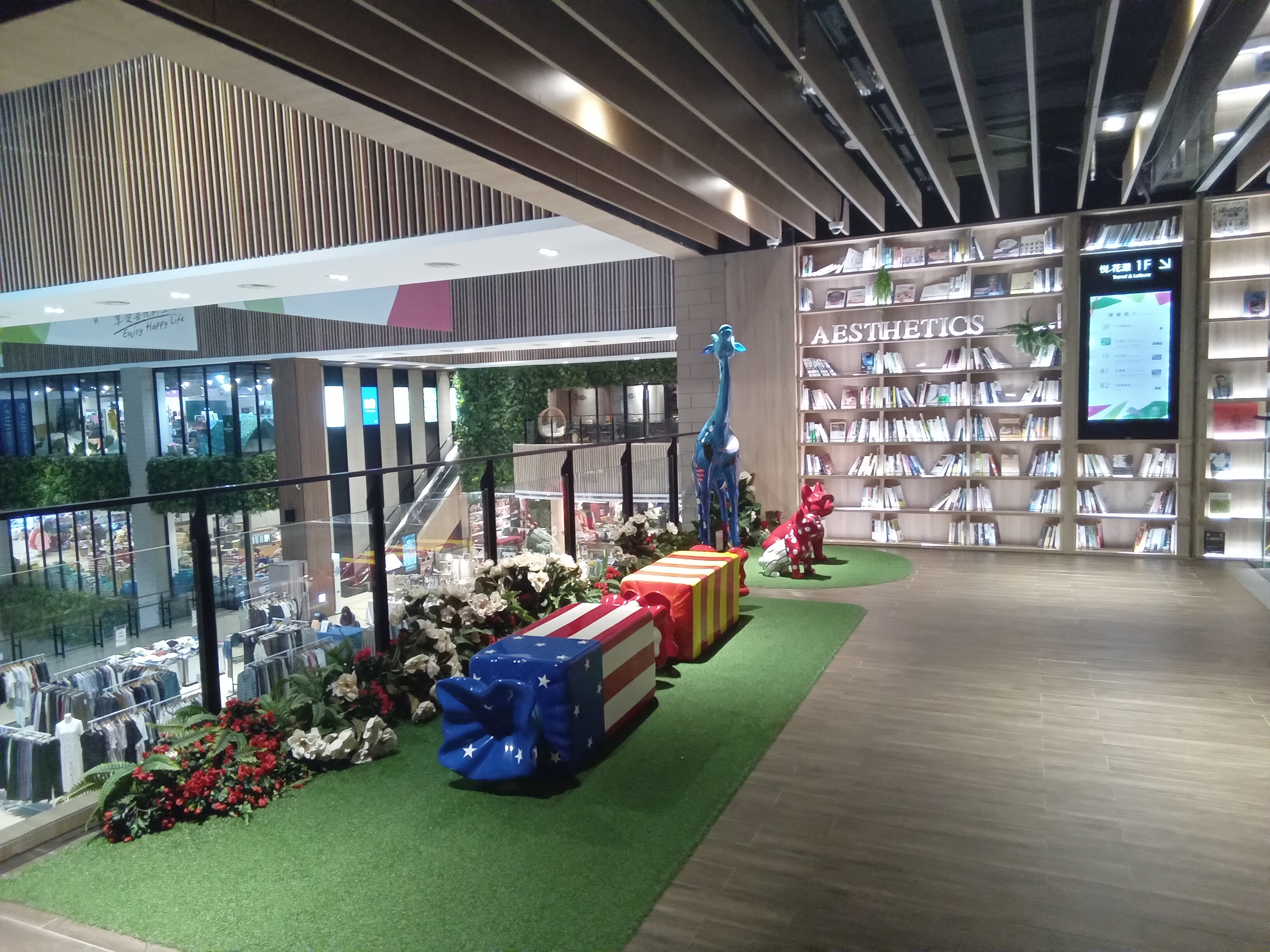
2nd Floor Installation Art and Book Wall

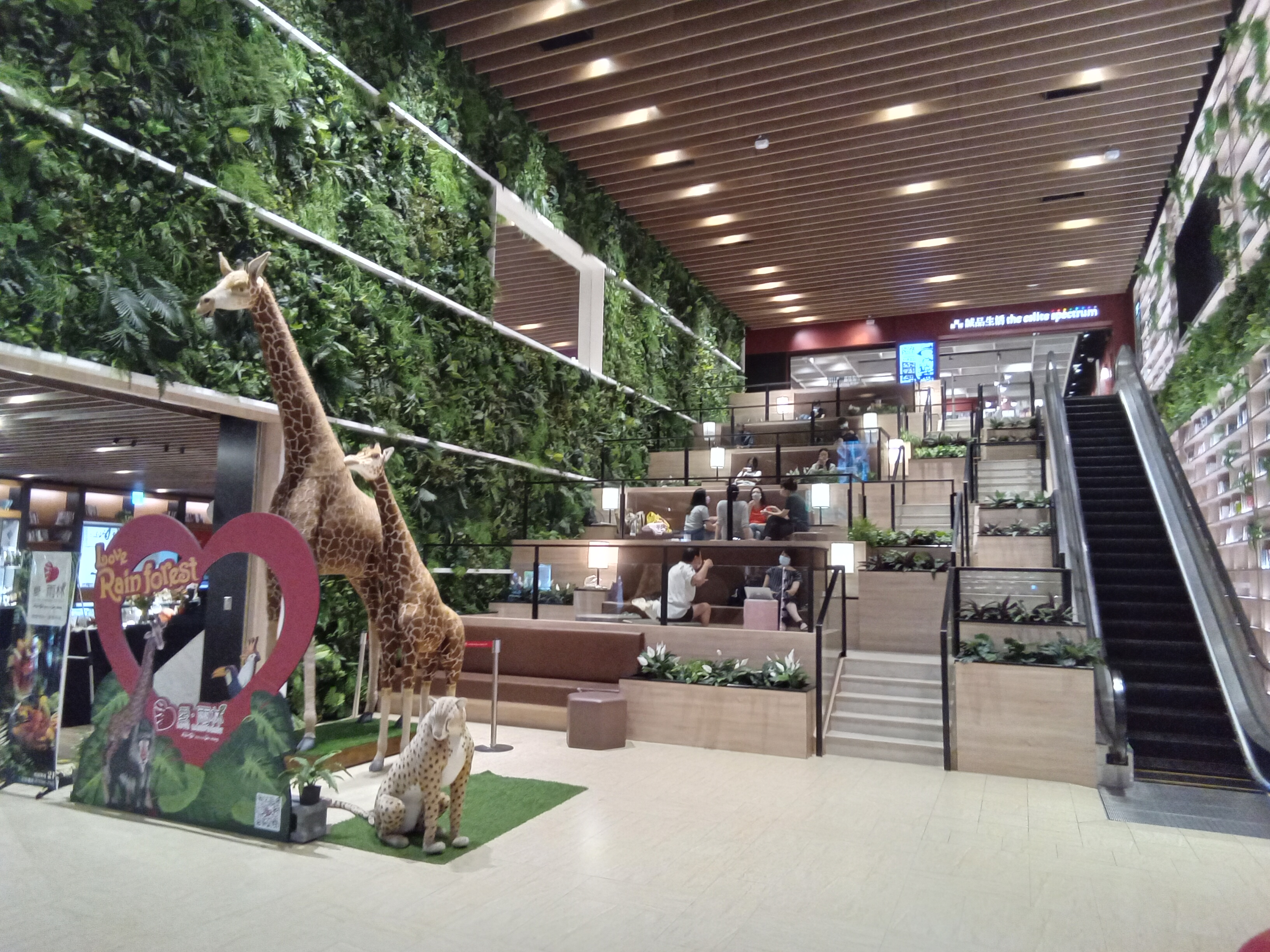
1st and 2nd floors book wall and resting area

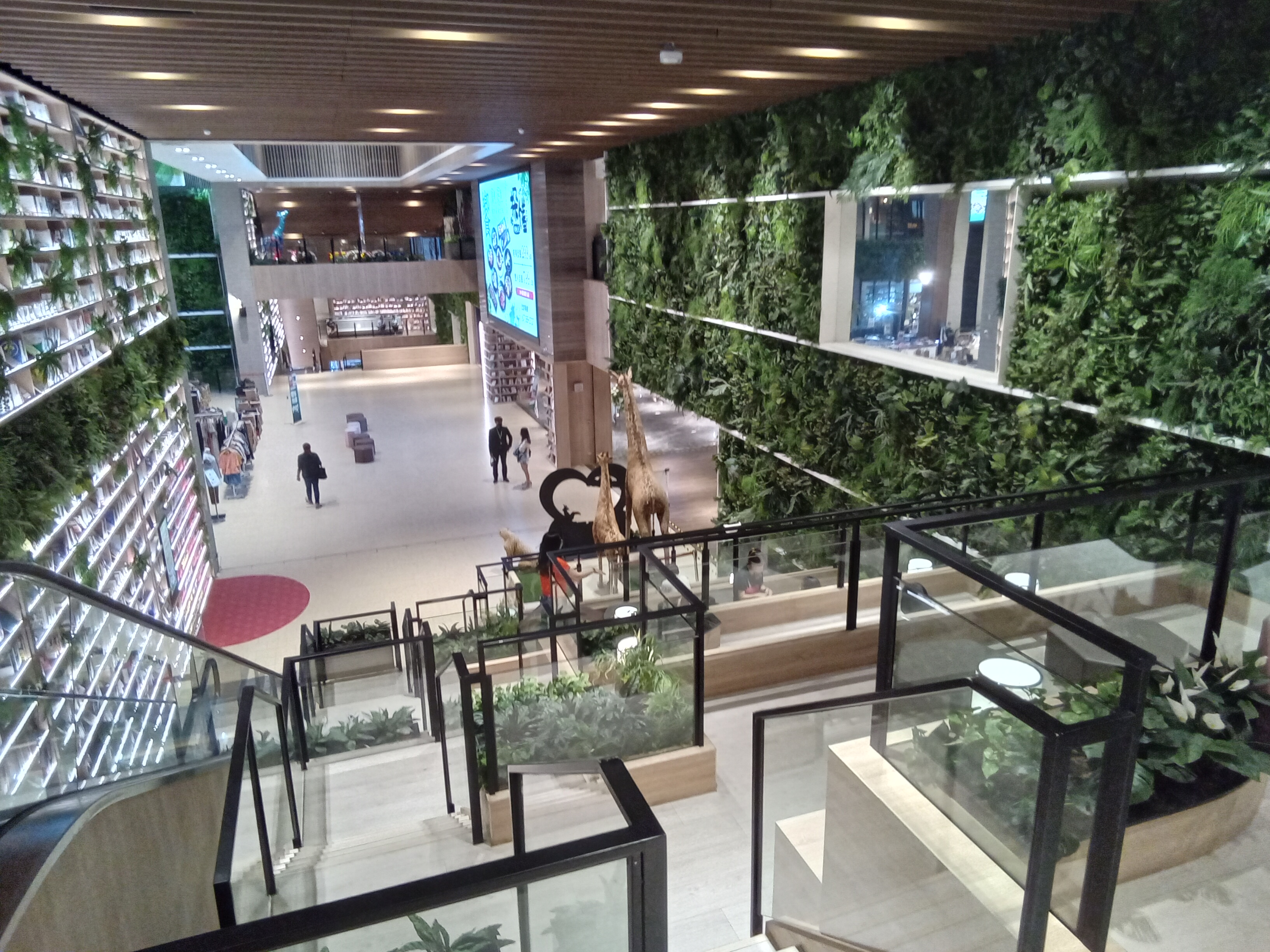
1st and 2nd floors book wall and resting area

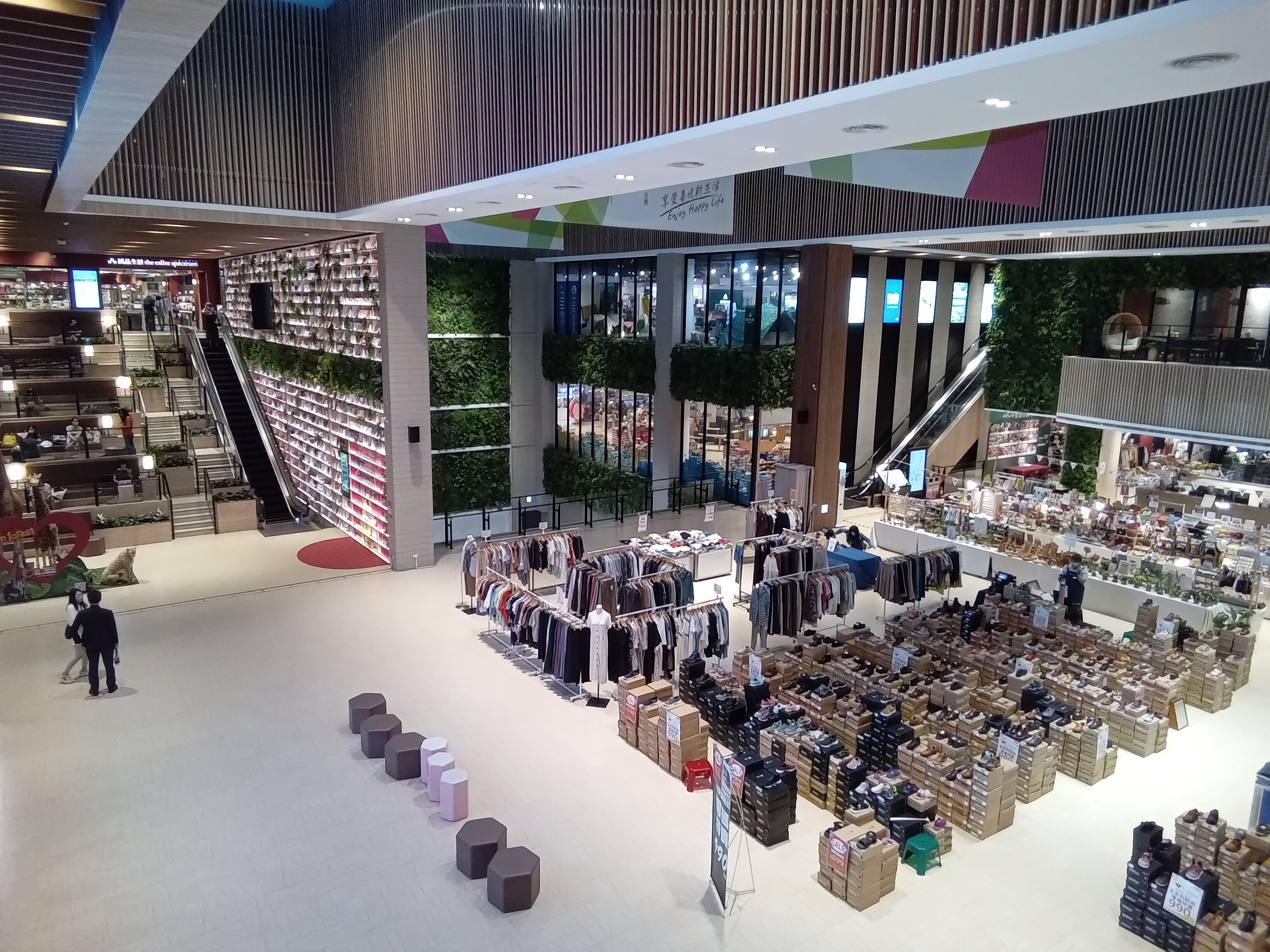
1st floor foyer atrium

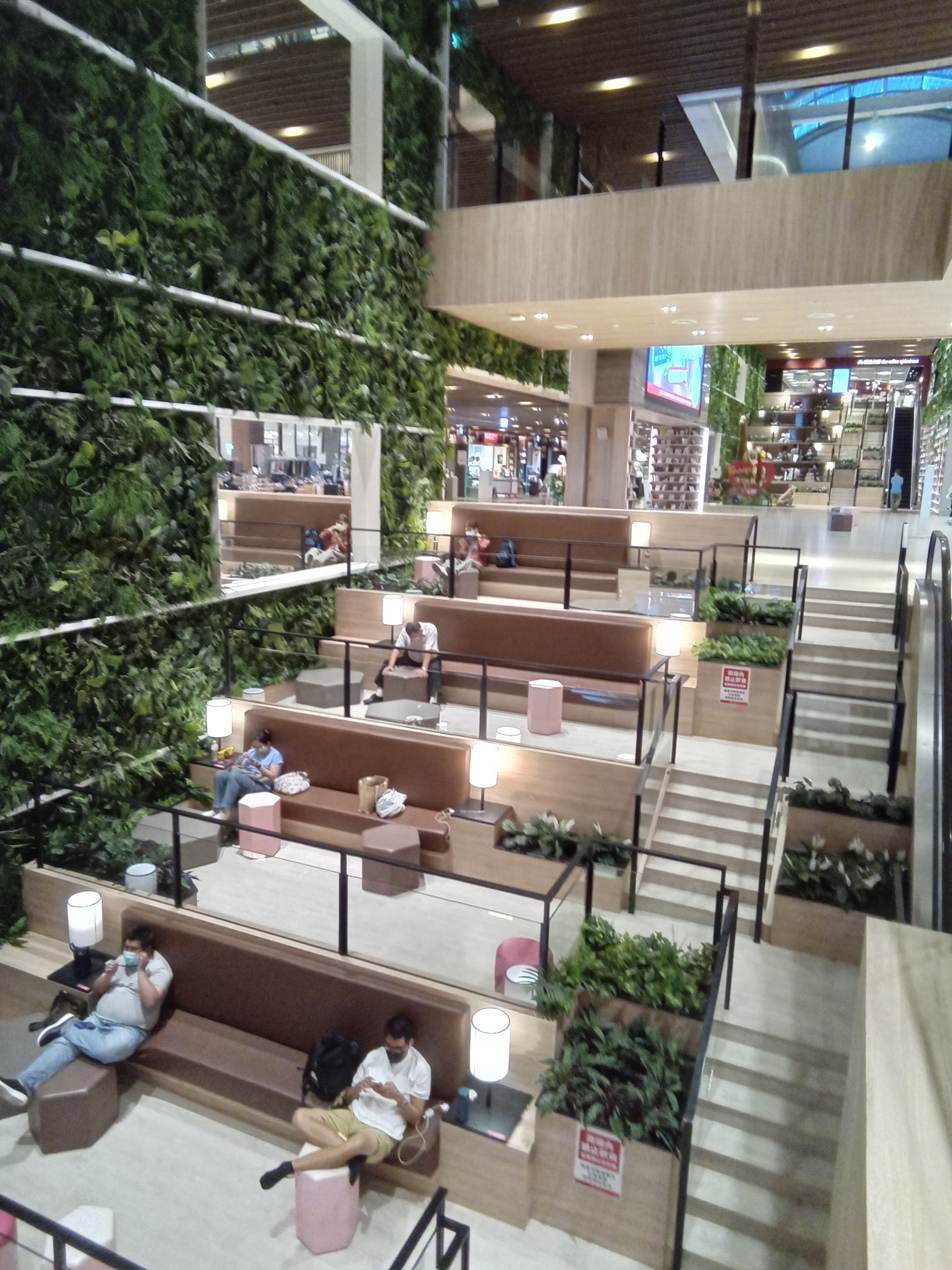
1st and B1 floors book wall and resting area

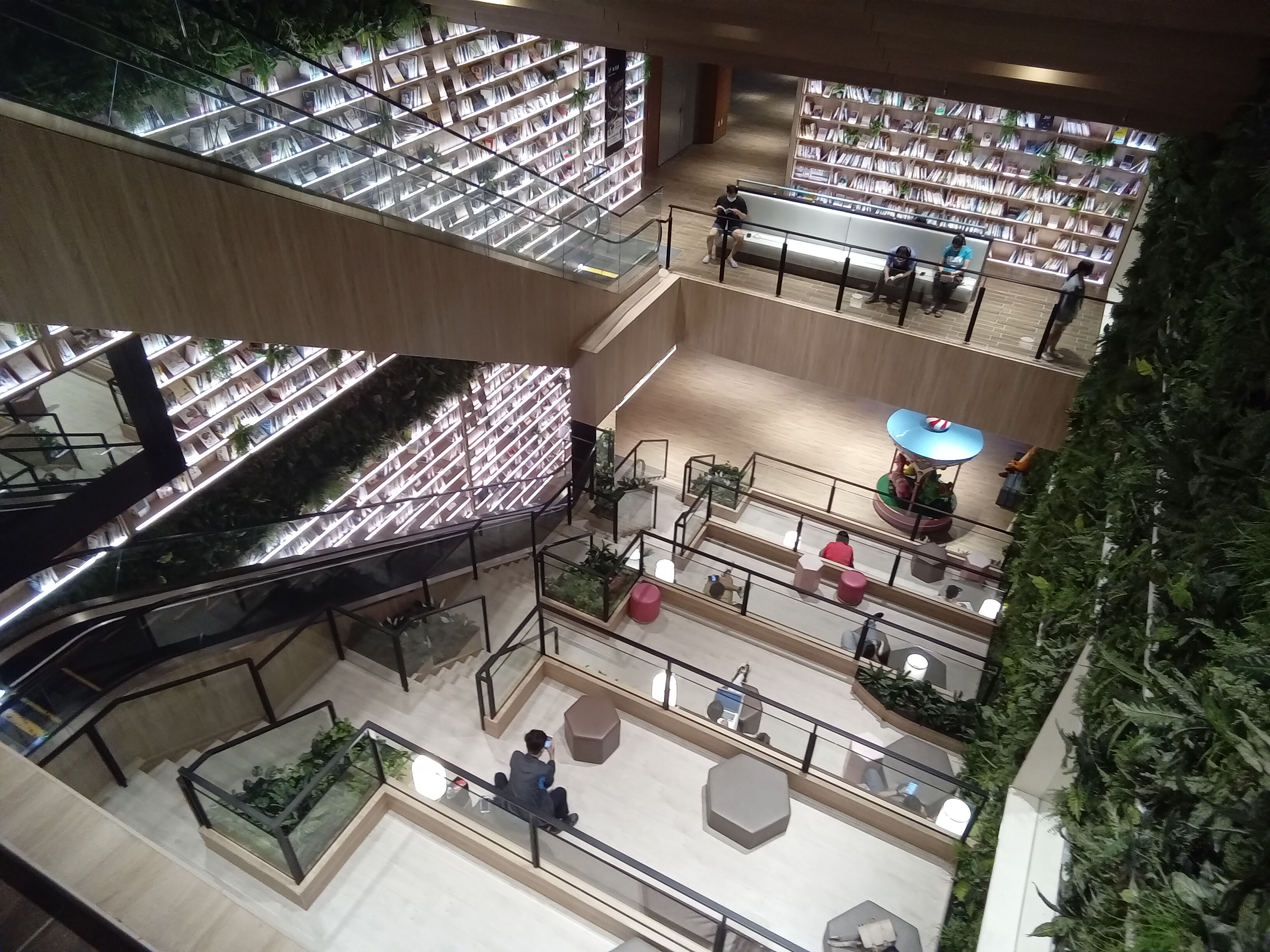
1st and B1 floors book wall and resting area

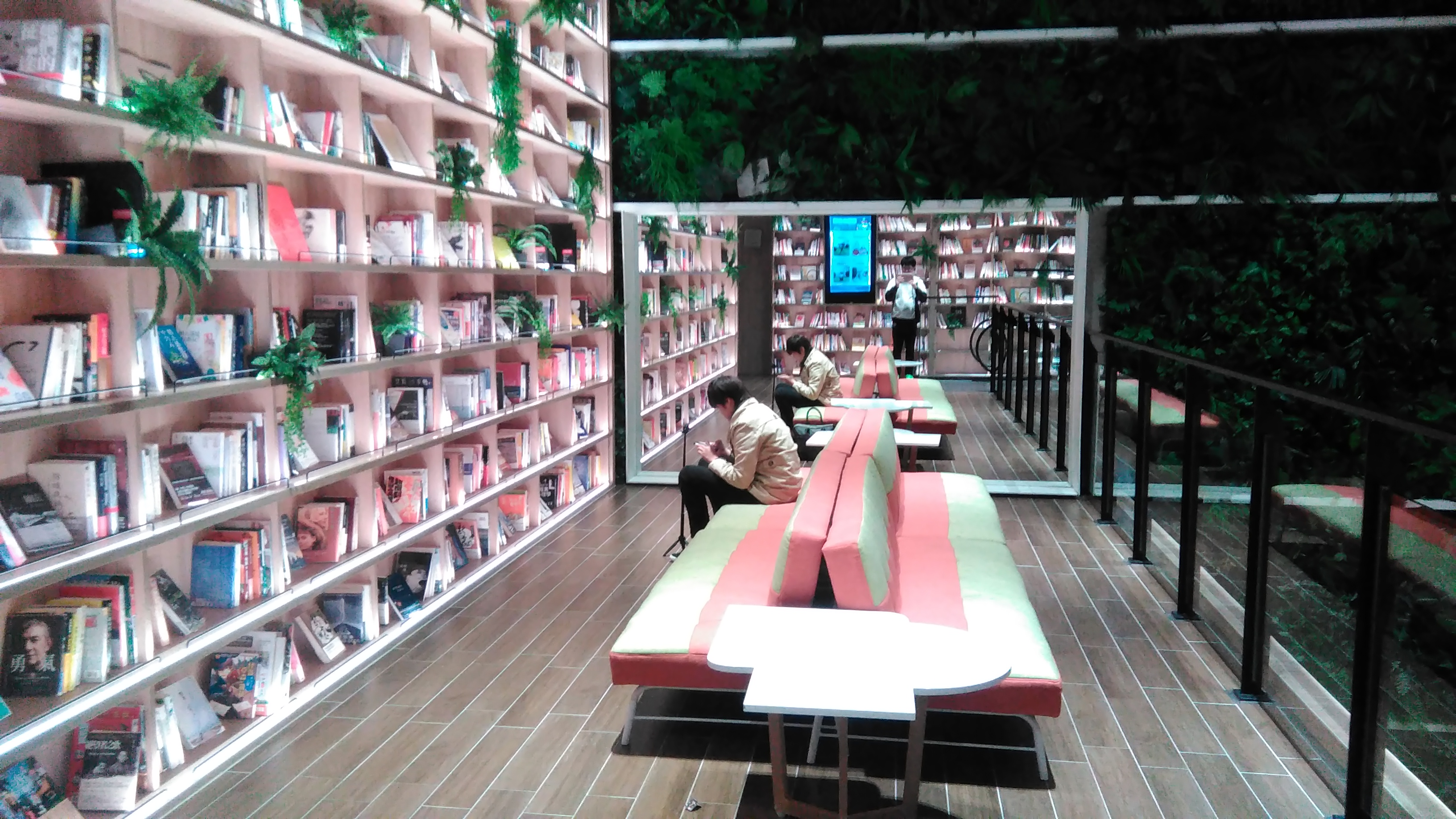
1st floor book wall and resting area

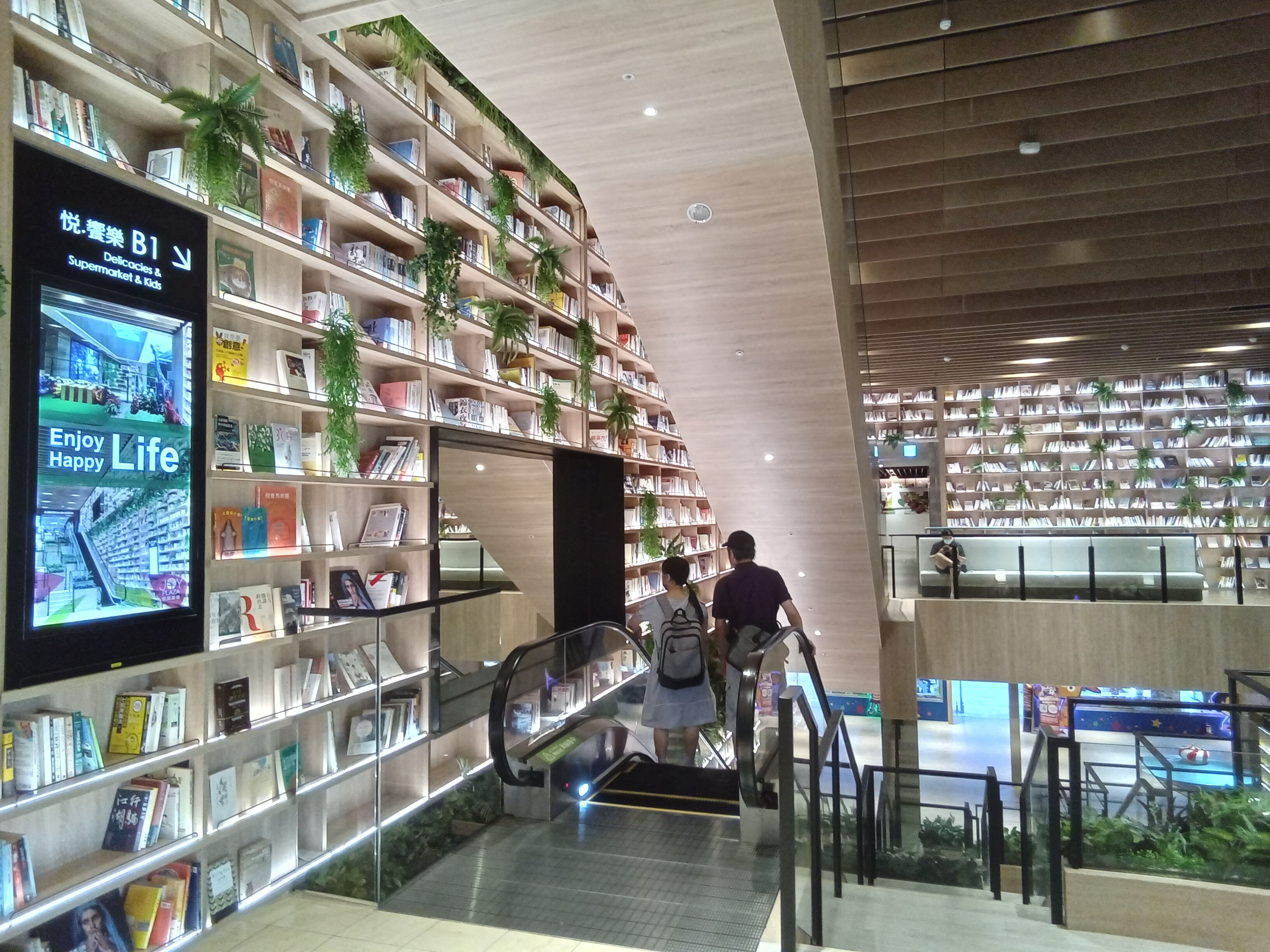
Escalator

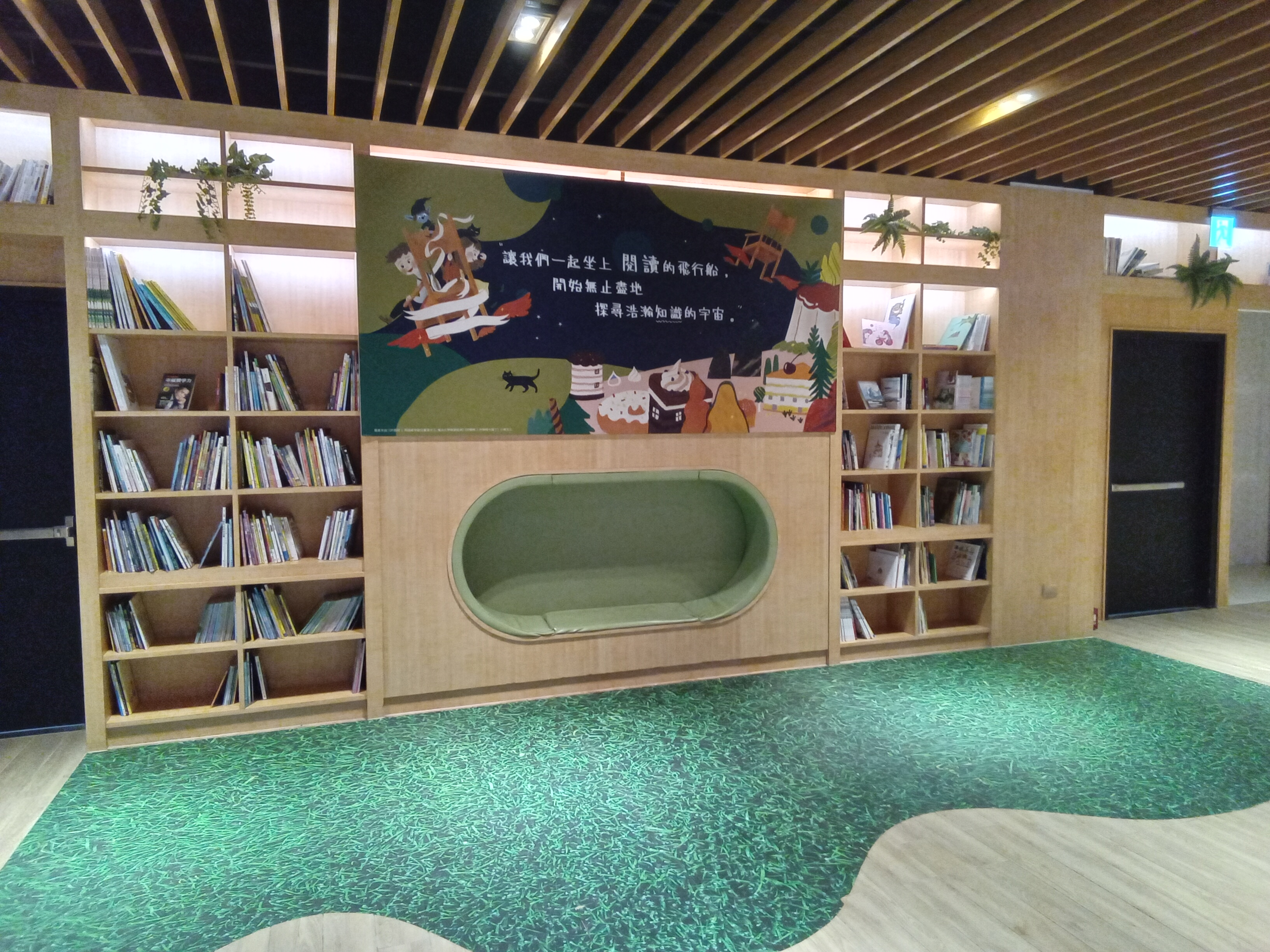
B1 Floor Children's Book Wall

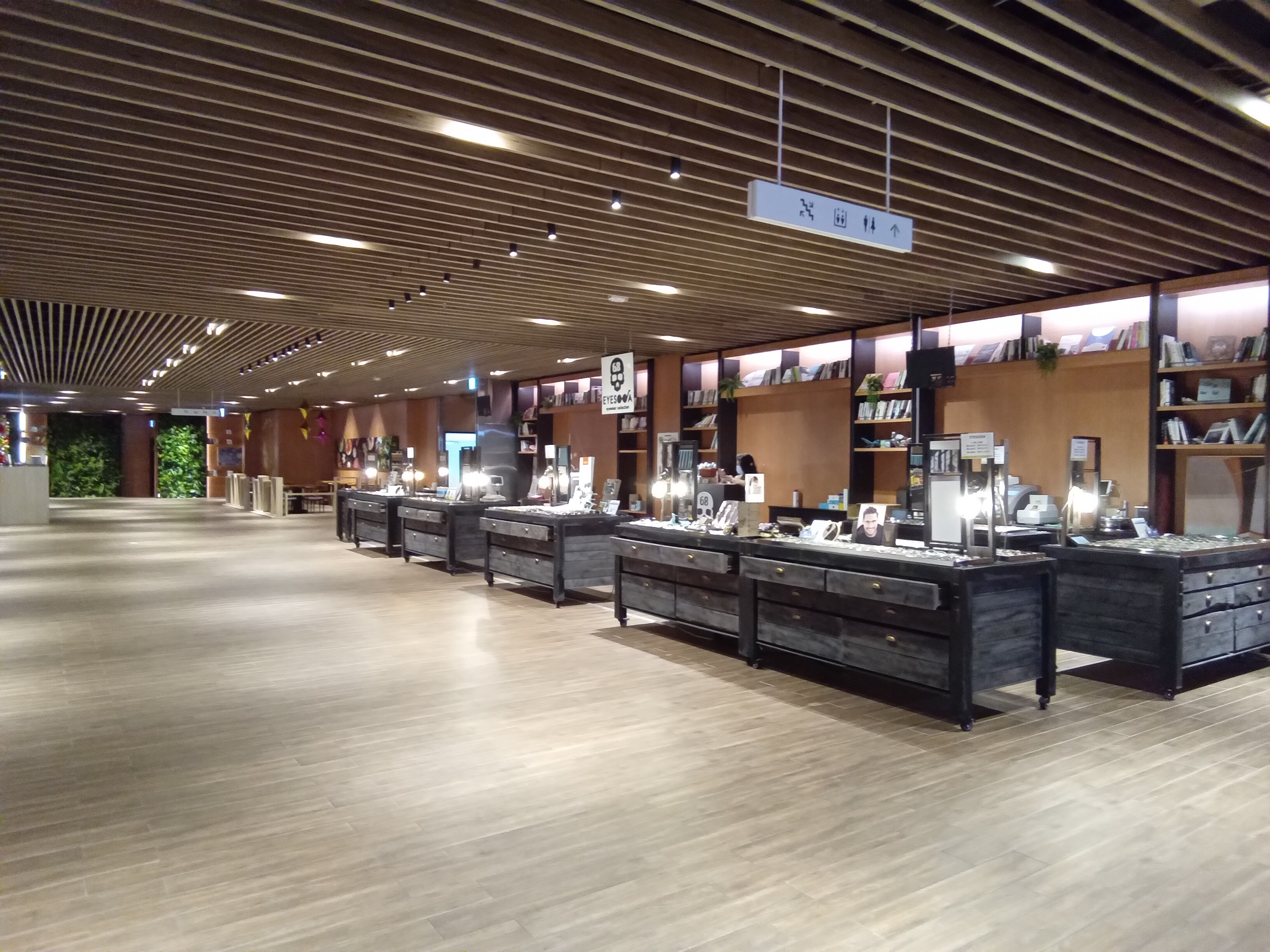
2nd Floor

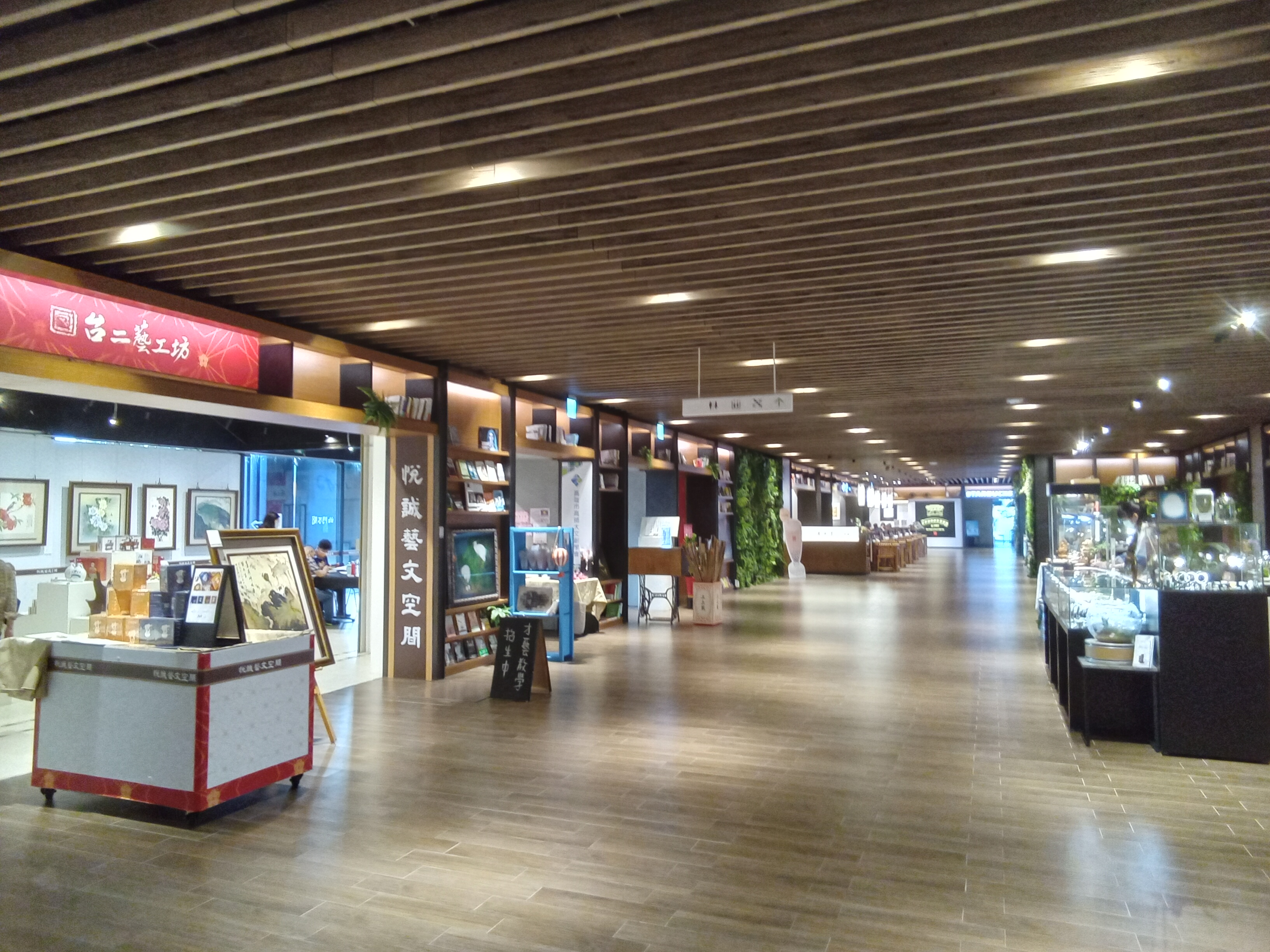
1st Floor

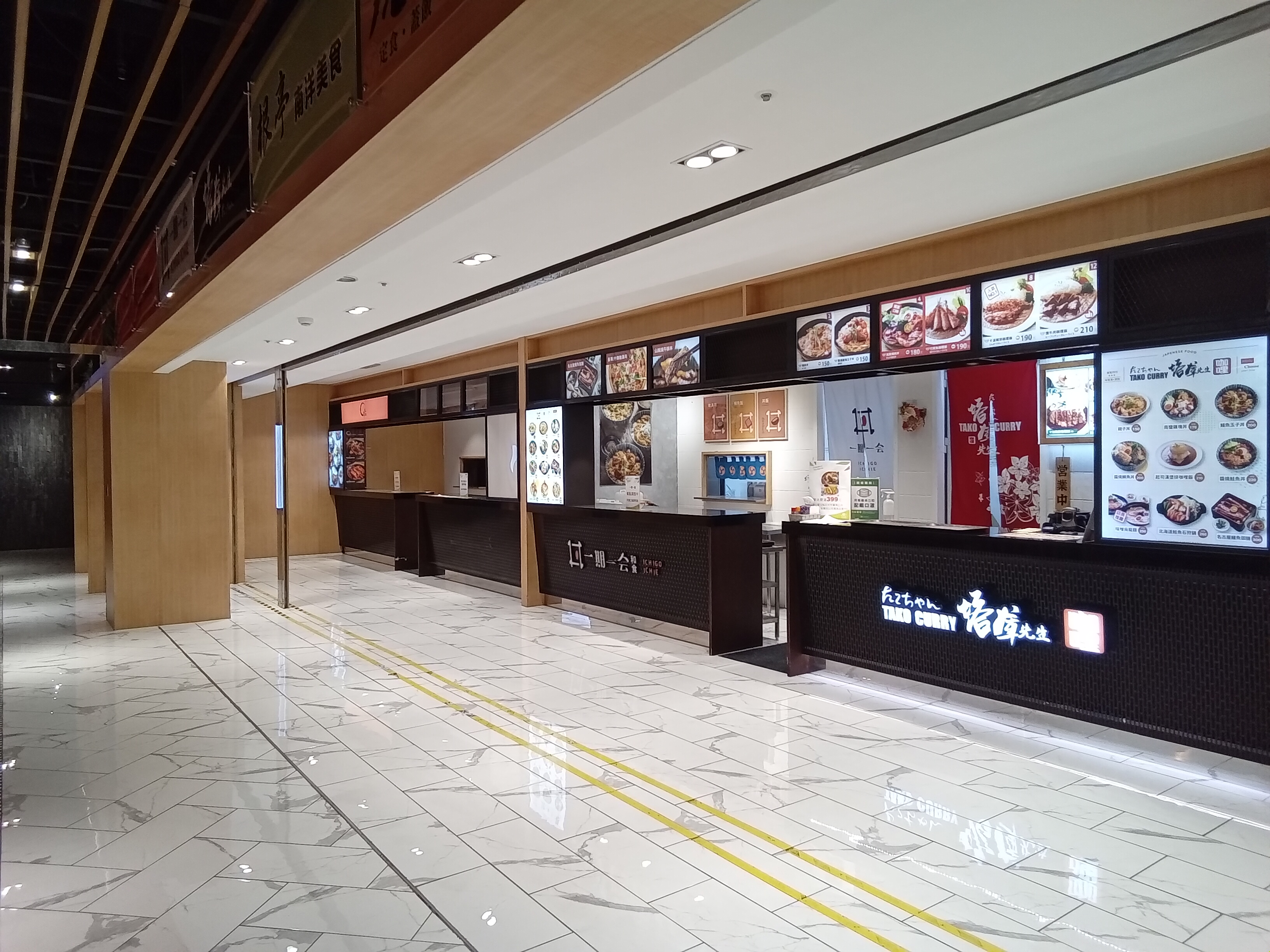
B1 floor Food Court

== See also ==
- List of tourist attractions in Taiwan
- Lovego Plaza
