= Ecological region =

Ecological region may refer to:

- A collection of ecological districts of New Zealand
- Ecoregion, a geographically defined area that is smaller than an ecozone and larger than an ecosystem
- Ecological District metro station
