= Chicken wing rice roll =

Taiwanese chicken and rice dish

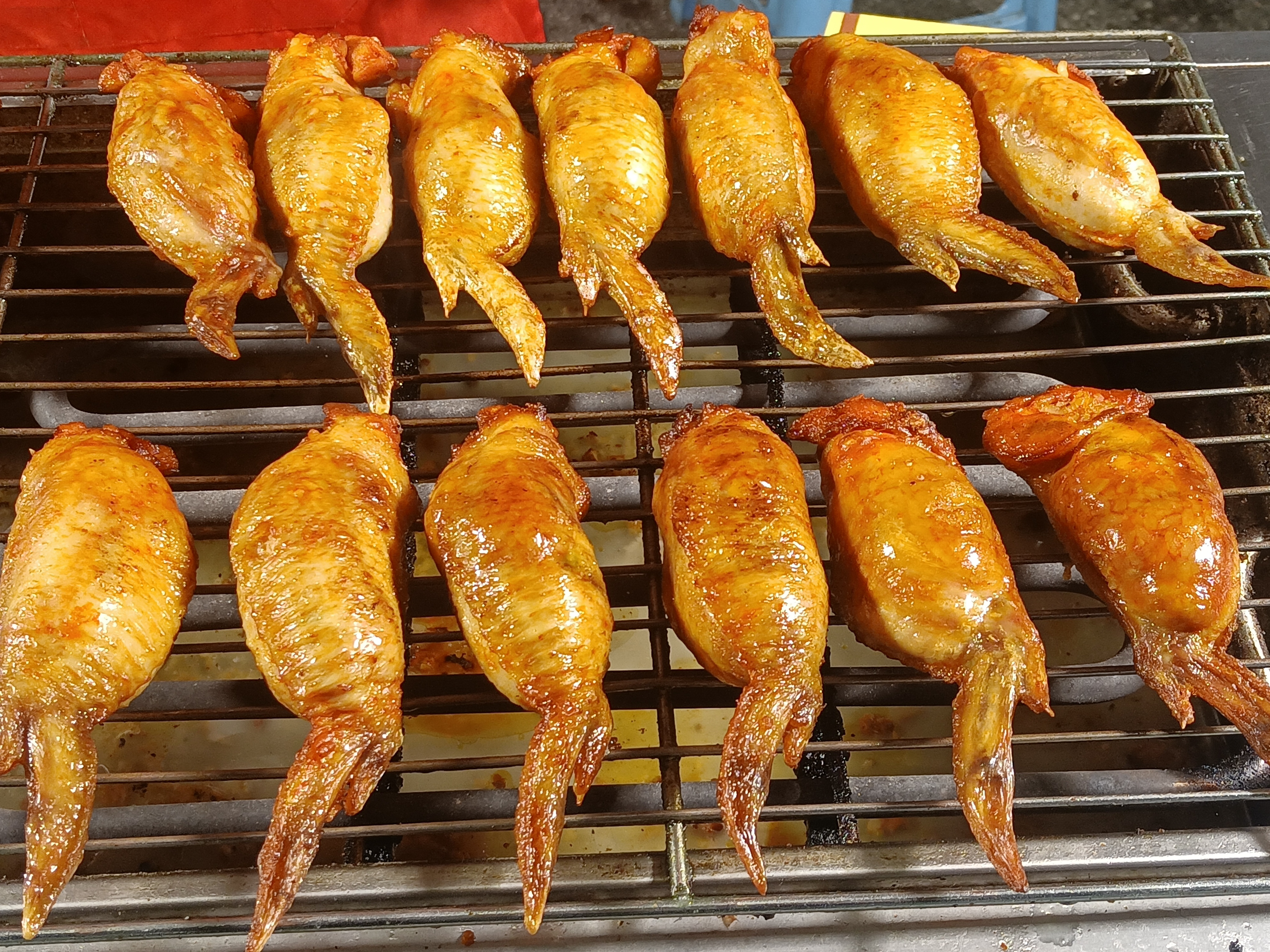
- Region or state: Taiwan
- Associated cuisine: Taiwan
- Main ingredients: fried rice, chicken wing

Chicken wing rice roll (Chinese: 雞翅包飯; pinyin: jīchì bāo fàn; Pe̍h-ōe-jī: kue-si̍t-pau-pn̄g) is a Taiwanese dish consisting of marinated, deboned chicken wings with fried rice stuffing, often enhanced with mushrooms, carrots, and other ingredients, often found in night markets across Taiwan. After stuffing, the chicken wings are lightly coated with oil and baked in an oven until the skin turns golden and crispy. Alternatively, they can be pan-fried until the surface is golden brown.

== Variations ==
The chicken wing rice roll has inspired numerous variations, especially in night markets such as Kaohsiung's Ruifeng Night Market. Popular variations include kimchi fried rice and curry rice fillings, which offer different flavor profiles and cater to diverse tastes.

== See also ==
- Taiwanese cuisine
- Taiwanese turkey rice
- Tube rice pudding
