= Tower of Light (disambiguation) =

The Tower of Light is a former transmission tower in Sanmin District, Kaohsiung, Taiwan.

It may also refer to:

- Tower of Light, Johannesburg, a pavilion built for the Empire Exhibition, South Africa in 1936, now part of the University of the Witwatersrand's west campus
- Tower of Light (theatre), a Yiddish musical theater in Odessa
- Tower of Light (video game), a 1989 game for the ZX Spectrum
