= Rueifong Night Market =

Night market in Zuoying, Kaohsiung, Taiwan

Rueifong Night Market 瑞豐夜市
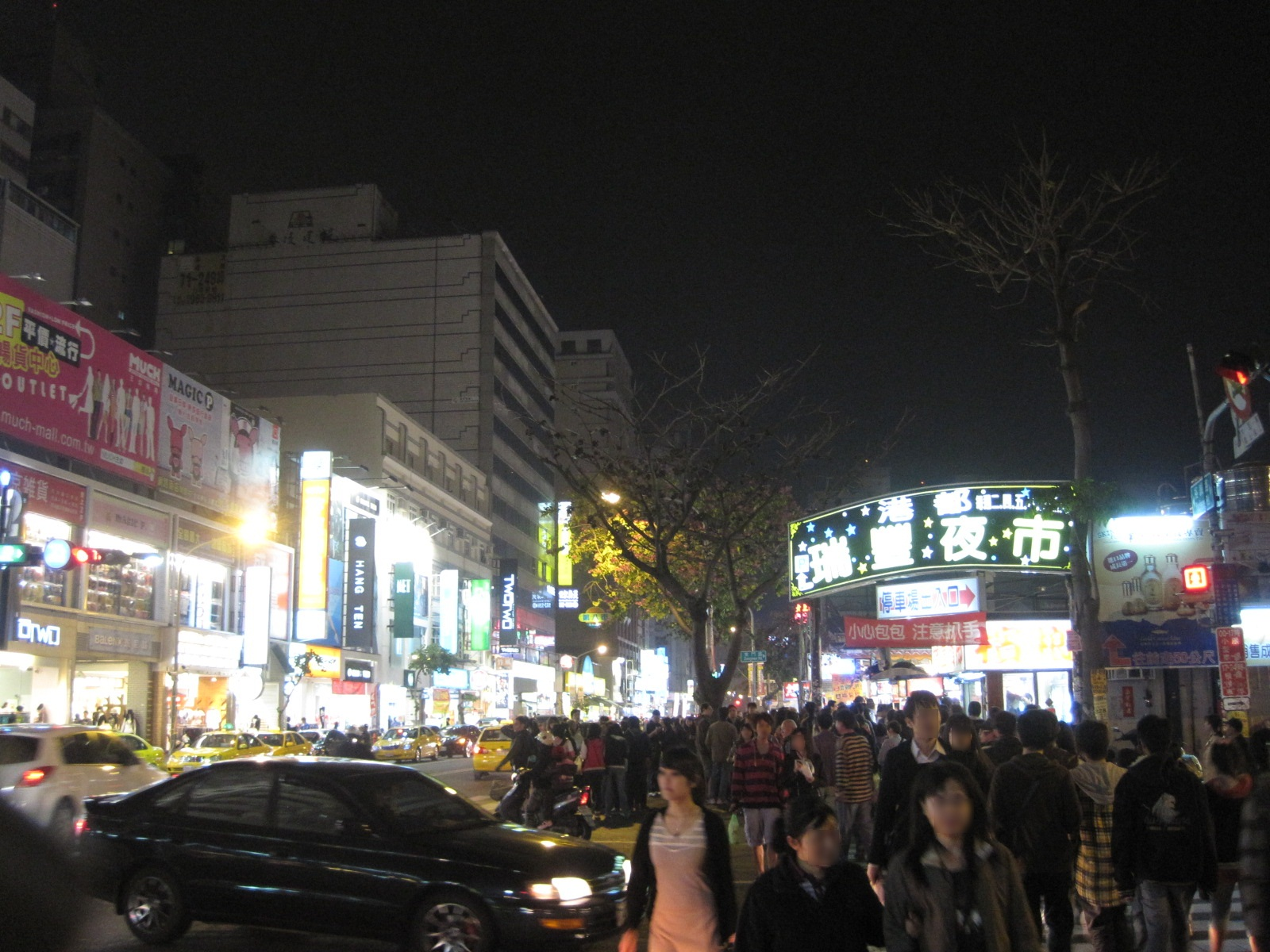
- Location: Zuoying, Kaohsiung, Taiwan; 22°39′58.4″N 120°17′58.9″E
- Environment: Night market
- Total retail floor area: 3,000 m^{2}
- Interactive map of Rueifong Night Market 瑞豐夜市

Rueifong Night Market (Chinese: 瑞豐夜市; pinyin: Ruìfēng Yèshì) is in the Zuoying District, Kaohsiung, Taiwan, located between the Yucheng and Nanping Road (close to the Kaohsiung Municipal Sanmin Home Economics and Commerce Vocational High School), and is nowadays considered to be one of the largest and most popular night markets in the city.

== Overview ==
The night market occupies an area of nearly 3,000 m^{2} and has a nearly 20-year history. It used to be presented in disorder by the streetside street vendors at the beginning. Over time, it has been developed into the shape of an "L" in its current spot in order to centralize the business administration. The night market holds hundreds of stalls with variety, which are mostly food vendors and small eateries. The surrounding business of sell non-food items such as accessories or fashion apparel. Like other night markets in Taiwan, the local vendors begin opening around 5 PM. As students begin returning home from school, crowds reach their peak from 8 to 11 PM, businesses continue operating well past midnight and close around 1 or 2 AM. On top of that, tourist traffic has increased due to the launch of the Kaohsiung Metro system in 2008. The night market is close to Kaohsiung Arena Station on the Gangshan / Siaogang Line (Red Line) as it is known by locals. It takes less than 3 minutes to walk from the Kaohsiung Arena station to Ruifeng night market, and the riders will start feeling the crowds once they get off from the MRT station.

== Historical Development ==
Rueifong night market has a nearly 20-year history. The market was not located at where it is now at first. It has grown gradually into the current plaza from the neighboring street vendors and shops in order to centralize the business. With the influx of customers, many new businesses and food vendors began to position themselves in the area and the current Rueifong Night Market was established. The present location does increase the managerial efficiency and effectiveness. In addition, it also reduces the traffic and time barrier for those who are interested in shopping or dining at the market. This night market has thrived since then and has become another favorite Kaohsiung night life option among residents and visitors.

Multiple vendors fill the market each night. The night market tends to attract people to come for a gathering since it comprises all the "beer and skittles". You can find late-night snacks, entertainment, and shopping. Tourists can also bargain with locals for handicrafts, clothing, shoes, and accessories. A lot of students try out the mini toy crane machine and other games of chance when they visit the night market as well. At the night market, people can experience the traditional carnival games such as balloon shooting, net fish, shooting marbles, darts, and a collection of mini games. Due to the popularity, it has developed a lively climate here, which is always full and packed. Especially during the weekends, the crowds seem to be able to fill the entire market - a sign of its popularity and success.

Because of the geographical location mainly students and office workers visit Rueifong. The night market is next to the high school and is a place for relaxing and refreshing after work. The market serves a wide variety of food or goods, e. g. delicacies (Xiaochi 小吃).

== Most famous foods ==
Rueifong Night Market has its own unique xiaochi foods available, and some of the xiaochi vendors have even been open for the past 20 years. For example, Wanguo Steak Teppanyaki (萬國鐵板燒牛排), Mongolian Barbecue (蒙古烤肉), Satay Barbecue(沙嗲烤肉), Brown Sugar Bubble Tea (黑糖珍珠奶茶), Crispy Fried Chicken (炸香酥雞), Traditional Herb Tea (古早味青草茶), Japanese Style Spicy and Hot Golden Fishball (日式麻辣黄金鱼蛋), Stinky Tofu (臭豆腐), Traditional Almond Tea with Pearls (傳統杏仁茶加粉圓), Chicken wing rice roll (雞翅包飯), and Papaya Milk Tea (木瓜牛奶) etc.

== See also ==
- List of night markets in Taiwan
- Liuhe Night Market
- Minzu Night Market
