= Chiayi turkey rice =

Taiwanese rice and turkey dish

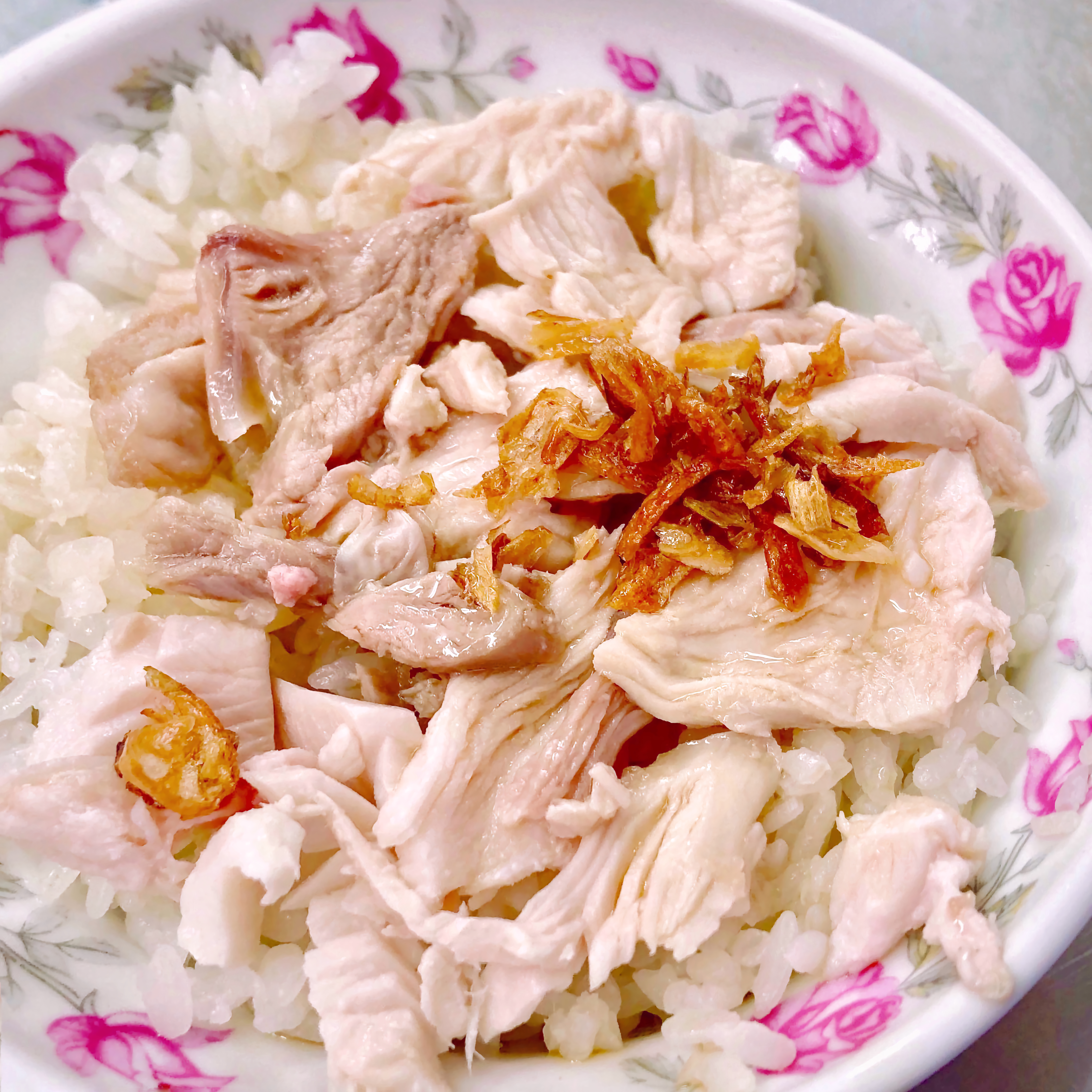
- Alternative names: Penshuei turkey rice, Taiwanese turkey rice
- Region or state: Chiayi City, Taiwan
- Associated cuisine: Taiwan
- Main ingredients: turkey, rice

Chiayi turkey rice
- Traditional Chinese: 嘉義火雞肉飯
Transcriptions
Standard Mandarin
- Hanyu Pinyin: Jiāyì huǒ jīròu fàn
Southern Min
- Hokkien POJ: Ka-gī Hóe-ke-bah-pn̄g

Chiayi turkey rice (Chinese: 嘉義火雞肉飯) is a bowl of rice with shredded turkey layered on top, often accompanied by pickled radish. The rice is drizzled with a kind of gravy made from the turkey drippings and soy sauce. It is an iconic specialty from Chiayi City in central Taiwan.

== History ==
After World War II, many US troops (mainly the US Air Force) were stationed in Taiwan. After the US military brought turkeys in, they were bred by farmers in central Taiwan. Due to the hardship after the war, it was not easy for ordinary people to eat chicken. The turkey is larger, with a lower price than chicken, and its nutritional value is also high, thus it became a good alternative. Local food stalls thought of using turkey as a snack ingredient. Traditionally, in Taiwan, the turkey breast is steamed and shredded into turkey slices, which are spread on the rice, and the sauce is poured onto it, which is called turkey shredded rice.

Chiayi turkey rice was featured on the Netflix TV series Street Food Season 1.

== Preparation ==
The traditional cooking method is to put turkey on top of white rice, and then drizzle turkey juice and lard, but different restaurants have slightly different practices. With the spread of culture, restaurants selling turkey rice can now be seen all around Taiwan. The traditional Chiayi turkey rice is mainly made of turkey meat, and the turkey sauce is a sauce made by steaming the whole turkey, with lard fried with shallots, mixed with turkey meat and rice. Traditional shops will sometimes sprinkle some crispy shallots on top of the turkey and served with a piece of pickled yellow dried radish.

== See also ==
- Taiwanese cuisine
- Tube rice pudding
- Chicken wing rice roll
