= Houyi metro station =

Metro station in Kaohsiung, Taiwan

Houyi R12 後驛
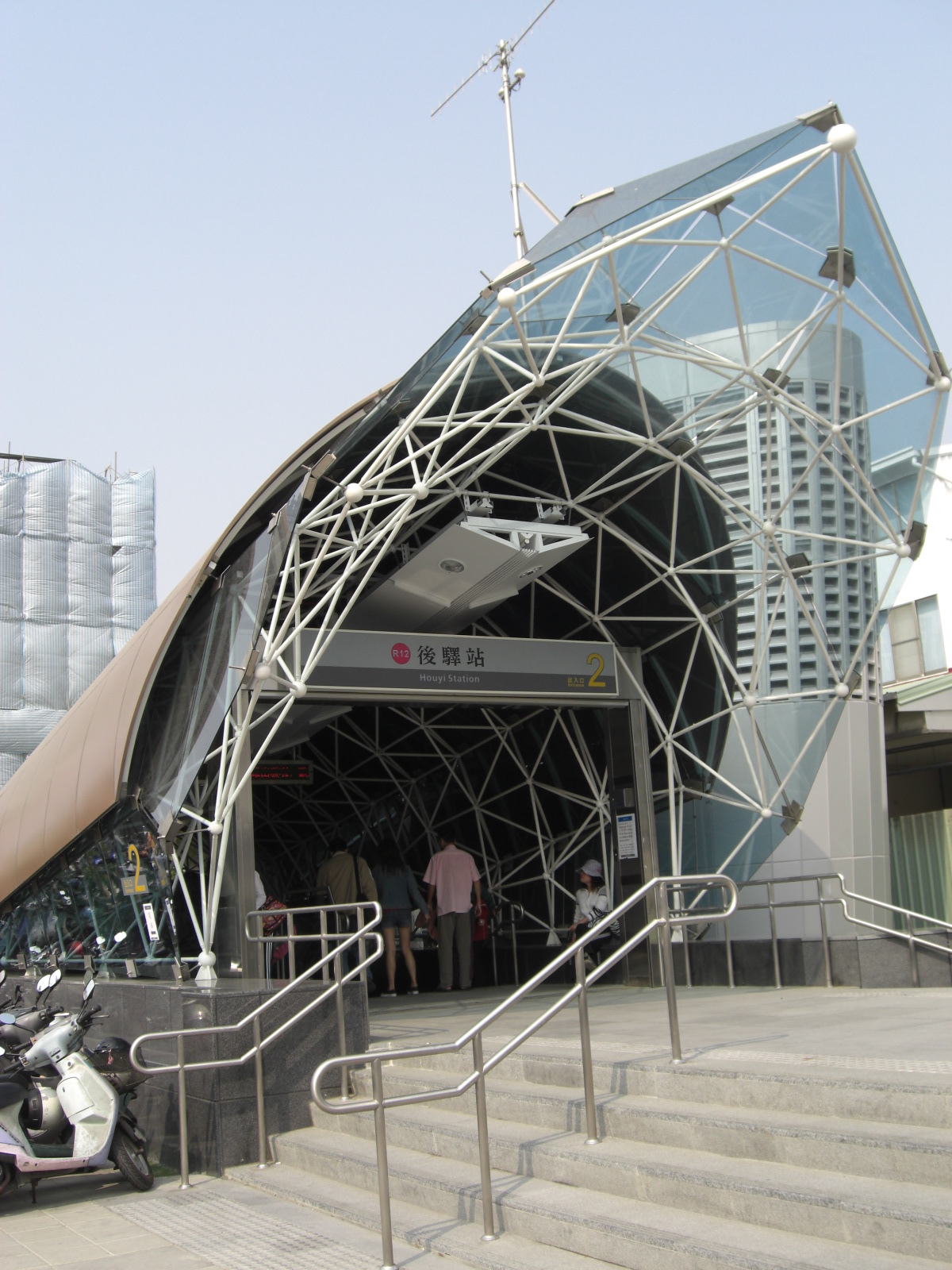
- Houyi station exit 2

Chinese name
- Traditional Chinese: 後驛車站
- Simplified Chinese: 后驿车站
Transcriptions
Standard Mandarin
- Hanyu Pinyin: Hòuyì Chēzhàn
- Bopomofo: ㄏㄡˋ ㄧˋ ㄔㄜ ㄓㄢˋ
- Wade–Giles: Hou^{4}-i^{4} Ch'ê^{1}-chan^{4}
- Tongyong Pinyin: Hòuyì Chējhàn

General information
- Location: Zuoying, Kaohsiung; Taiwan
- Coordinates: 22°38′54″N 120°18′12″E
- Operated by: Kaohsiung Rapid Transit Corporation
- Line: Red line (R12)
- Platforms: One island platform

Construction
- Structure type: Underground

History
- Opened: 2008-03-09

Passengers
- 8,467 daily (Jan. 2011)

Services
Preceding station	Kaohsiung Metro	Following station
Aozihdi towards Gangshan	Red line	Kaohsiung Main Station towards Siaogang
Location

Houyi is a station on the Red line of Kaohsiung MRT in Sanmin District, Kaohsiung, Taiwan. The character 驛 (Chinese:yì, Japanese: えき, eki) means "station" in Japanese; the station name literally means "(Kaohsiung) rear station".

== Station overview ==
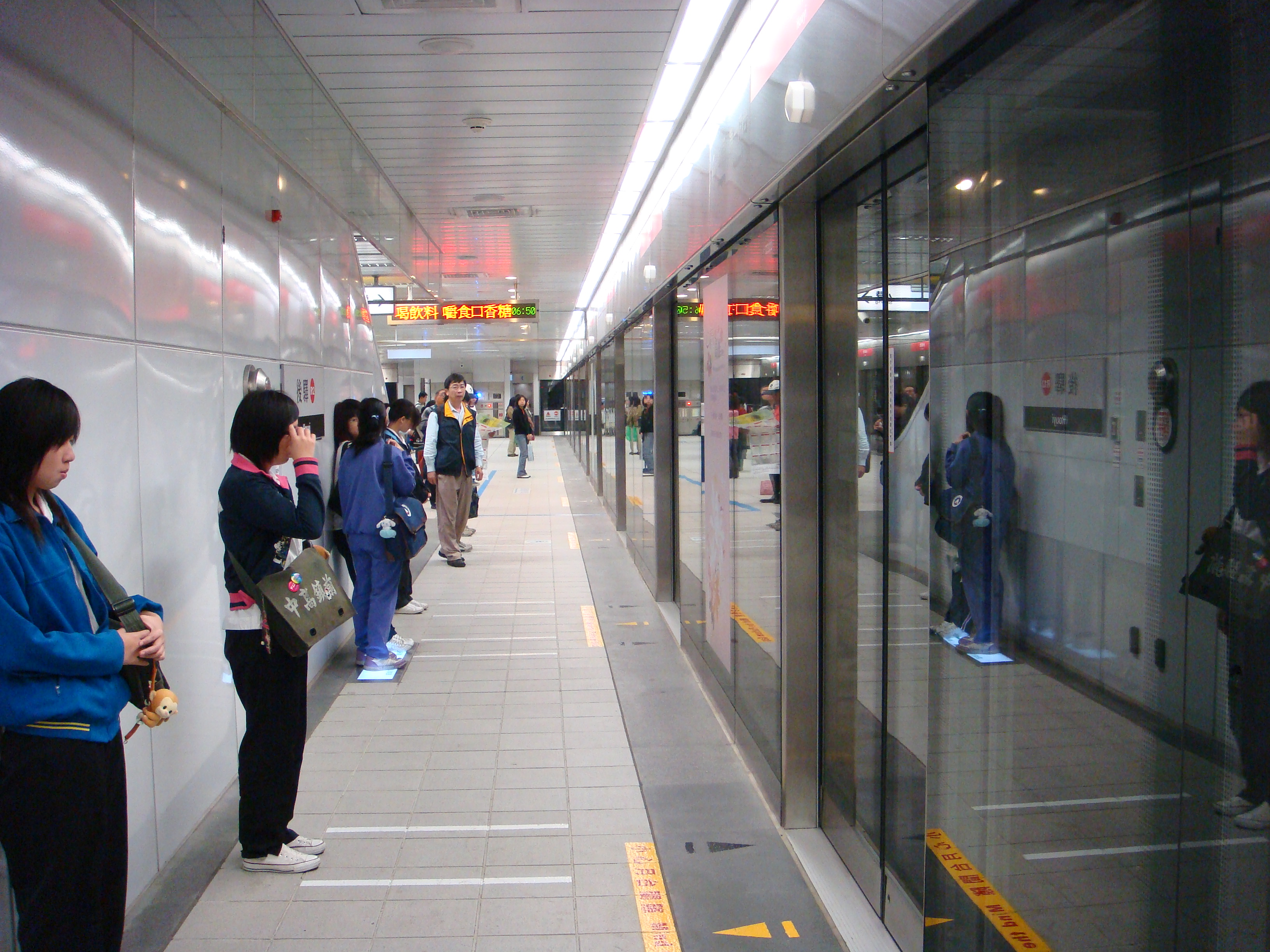
Platform of Houyi station

This is a two-level, underground station with an island platform and four exits. It is 193 metres long and is located at the intersection of Bo-ai 1st Rd. and Chahaer St.

== Around the station ==
- Kaohsiung Medical University
- Sanmin Park
- Tower of Light
