= Zhouzai Wetland Park =

Wetland in Zuoying, Kaohsiung, Taiwan

- 洲仔溼地公園 (Chinese)
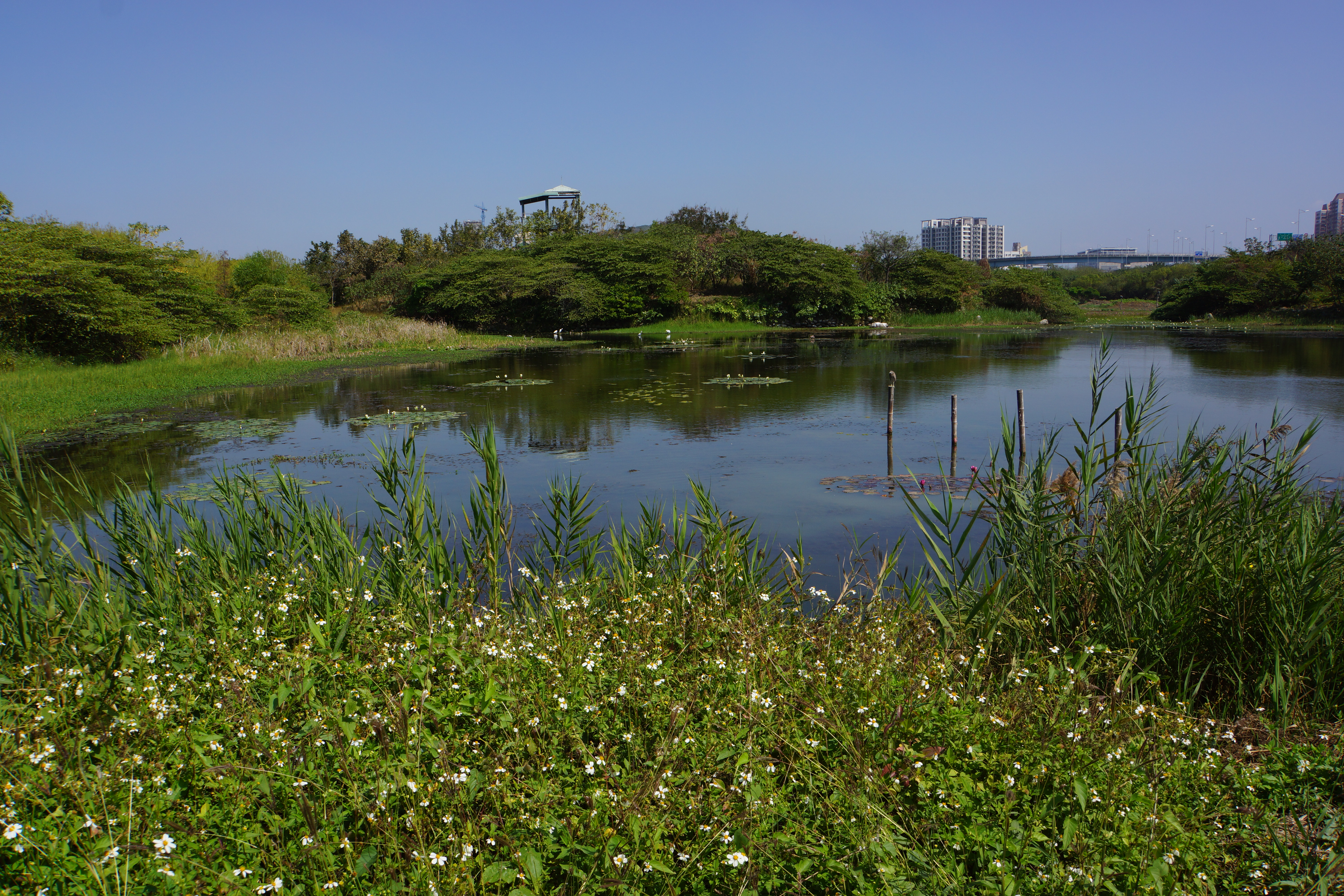

- Location within Kaohsiung
- Location: Zuoying, Kaohsiung, Taiwan
- Coordinates: 22°40′51.2″N 120°17′54.8″E
- Type: wetland

The Zhouzai Wetland Park (traditional Chinese: 洲仔溼地公園; simplified Chinese: 洲仔湿地公园; pinyin: Zhōuzǐ Shīdì Gōngyuán) is a wetland in Zuoying District, Kaohsiung, Taiwan.

== Ecology ==
The wetland serves as a place for various birds and aquatic plants.

== Facilities ==
The wetland features bird-watching classroom and viewing platforms.

== Transportation ==
The wetland is accessible within walking distance west of Ecological District Station of Kaohsiung Metro.
