= Kaohsiung Arena metro station =

Metro station in Kaohsiung, Taiwan

Coordinates: 22°39′58″N 120°18′12″E

Kaohsiung Arena R14 巨蛋
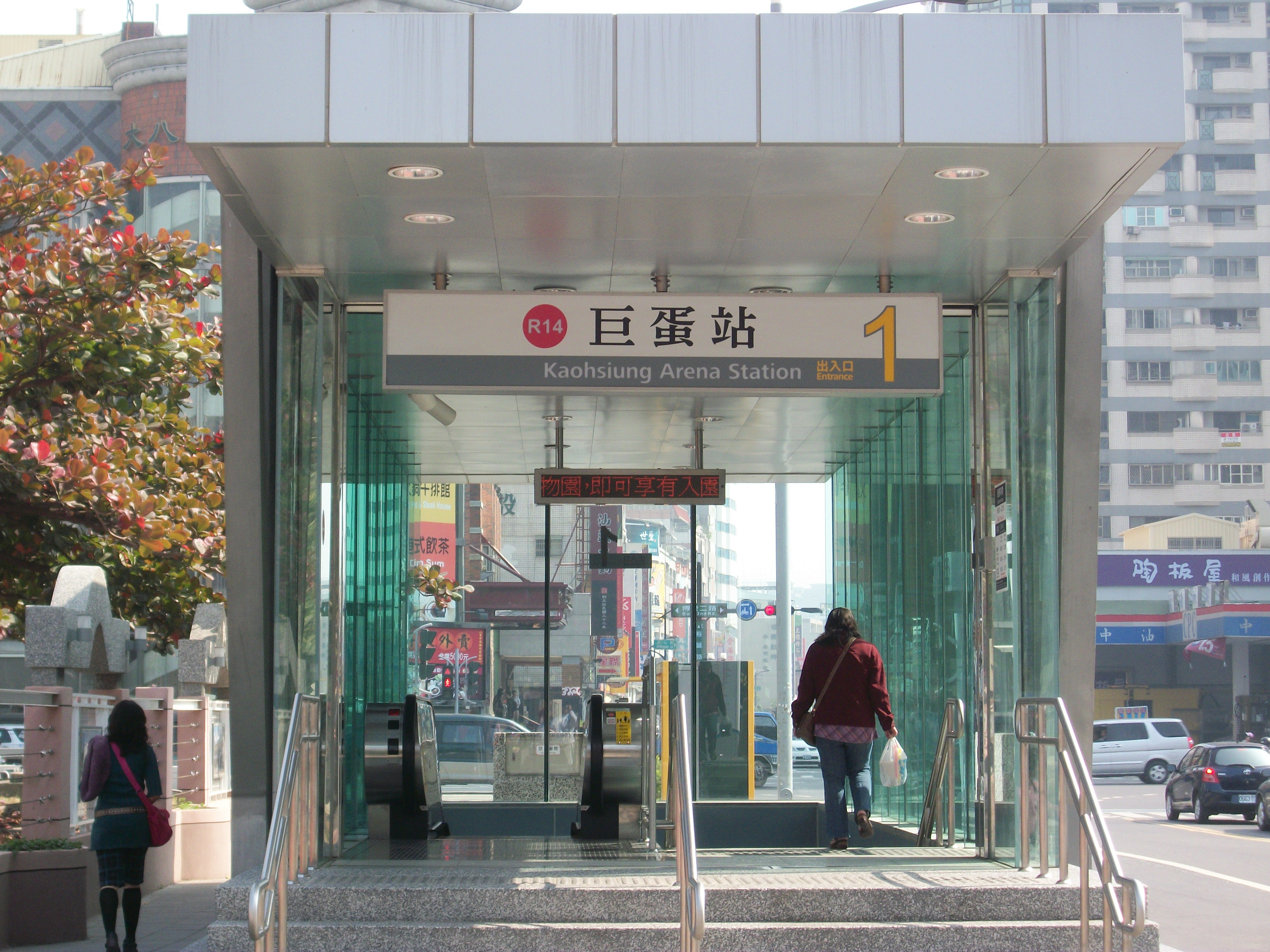
- Kaohsiung Arena station exit

Chinese name
- Traditional Chinese: 巨蛋車站
- Simplified Chinese: 巨蛋车站
Transcriptions
Standard Mandarin
- Hanyu Pinyin: Jùdàn Chēzhàn
- Bopomofo: ㄐㄩˋ ㄉㄢˋ ㄔㄜ ㄓㄢˋ
- Wade–Giles: Chiu^{4}-dan^{4} Ch'ê^{1}-chan^{4}
- Tongyong Pinyin: Jùdàn Chējhàn

General information
- Other names: Sanmin Household & Commercial High School; 三民家商
- Location: Zuoying, Kaohsiung; Taiwan
- Operated by: Kaohsiung Rapid Transit Corporation
- Line: Red line (R14)
- Platforms: One island platform

Construction
- Structure type: Underground

History
- Opened: 2008-03-09

Passengers
- 21,430 daily (Jan. 2011)

Services
Preceding station	Kaohsiung Metro	Following station
Ecological District towards Gangshan	Red line	Aozihdi towards Siaogang
Location

Kaohsiung Arena is a station on the Red line of Kaohsiung MRT in Zuoying District, Kaohsiung, Taiwan. The station is named after the nearby Kaohsiung Arena.

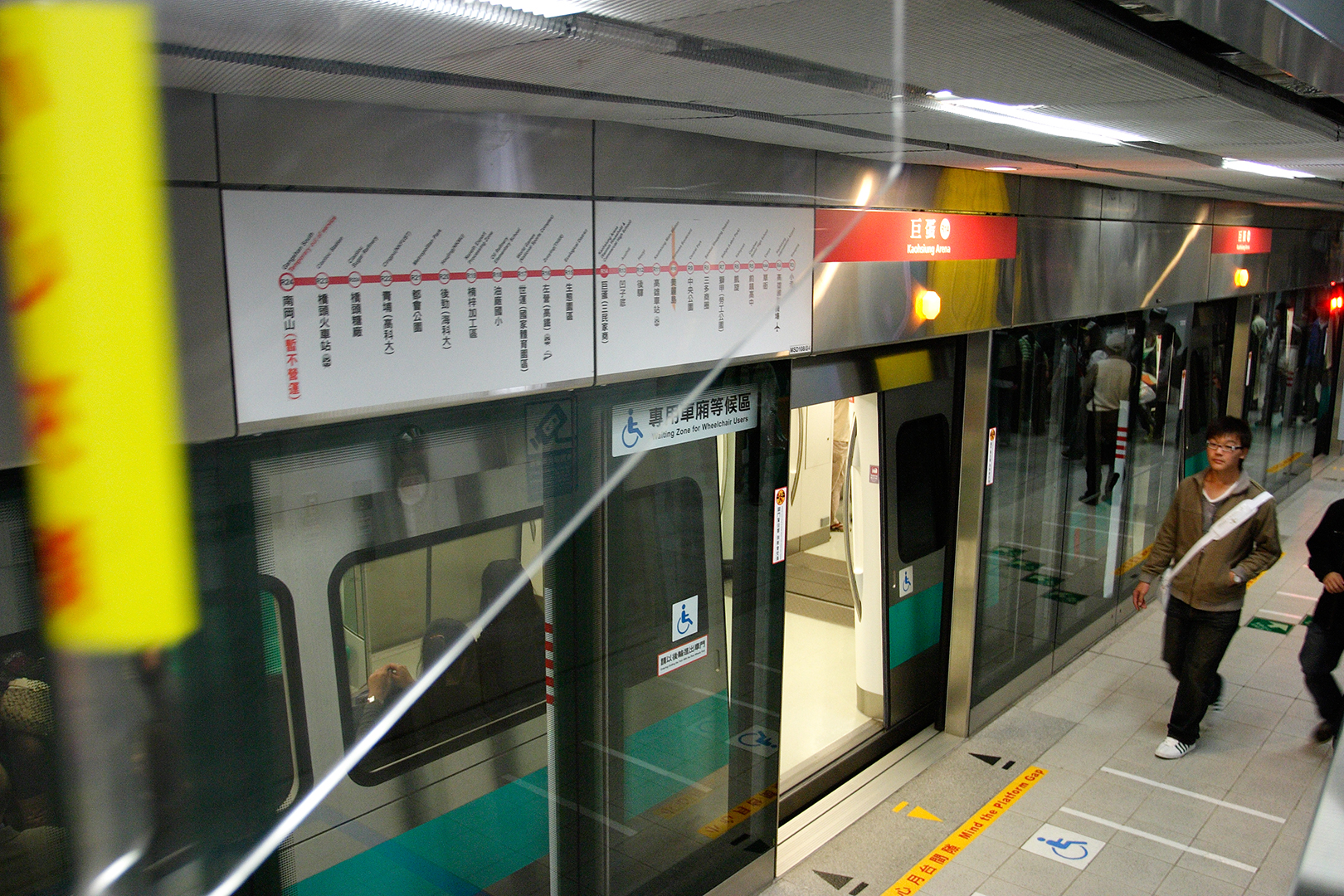
Kaohsiung Arena station platform

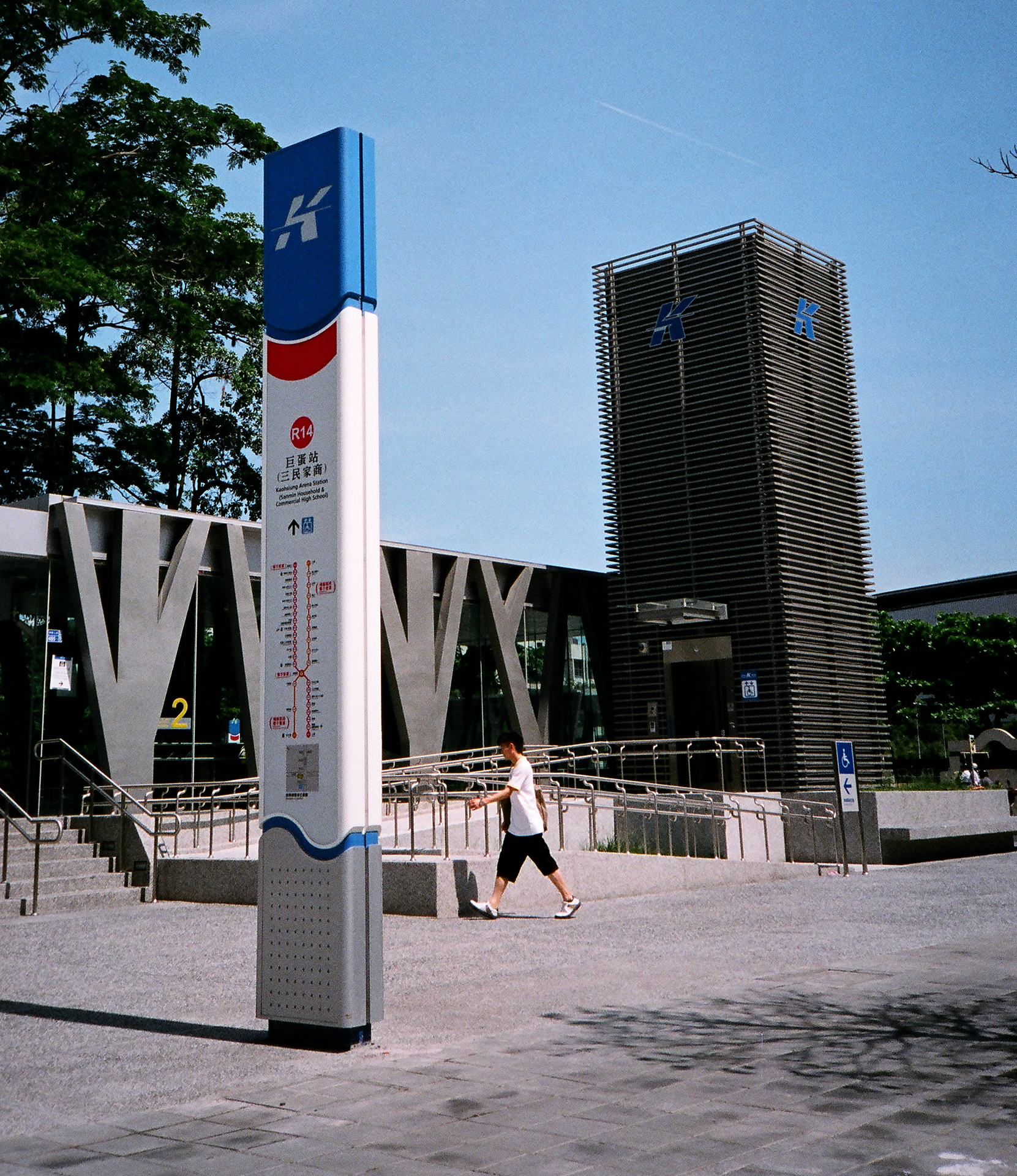
Kaohsiung Arena station exit 2

This is a two-level, underground station with an island platform and five exits. It is 215 metres long and is located at the intersection of Boai Road and Yucheng Road.

== Around the station ==
- Sanmin Home Economics & Commerce Vocational High School
- Ruifeng Night Market
- Kaohsiung Arena
- Hanshin Department Store
- Mingcheng Park
- Arena Shopping Circle
