= Kaohsiung Veterans General Hospital =

Hospital in Zuoying, Kaohsiung, Taiwan

Kaohsiung Veterans General Hospital 高雄榮民總醫院

Geography
- Location: Zuoying, Kaohsiung, Taiwan
- Coordinates: 22°40′42.7″N 120°19′23.2″E

Organisation
- Type: hospital

History
- Founded: 1990

The Kaohsiung Veterans General Hospital (KSVGH; traditional Chinese: 高雄榮民總醫院; simplified Chinese: 高雄荣民总医院; pinyin: Gāoxióng Róngmín Zǒng Yīyuàn) is a hospital in Zuoying District, Kaohsiung, Taiwan.

== History ==
The hospital was opened in 1990.

== Transportation ==
The hospital is accessible within walking distance east of Ecological District Station of Kaohsiung MRT.

== See also ==
- List of hospitals in Taiwan
