= Tube rice pudding =

Taiwanese glutinous rice dish

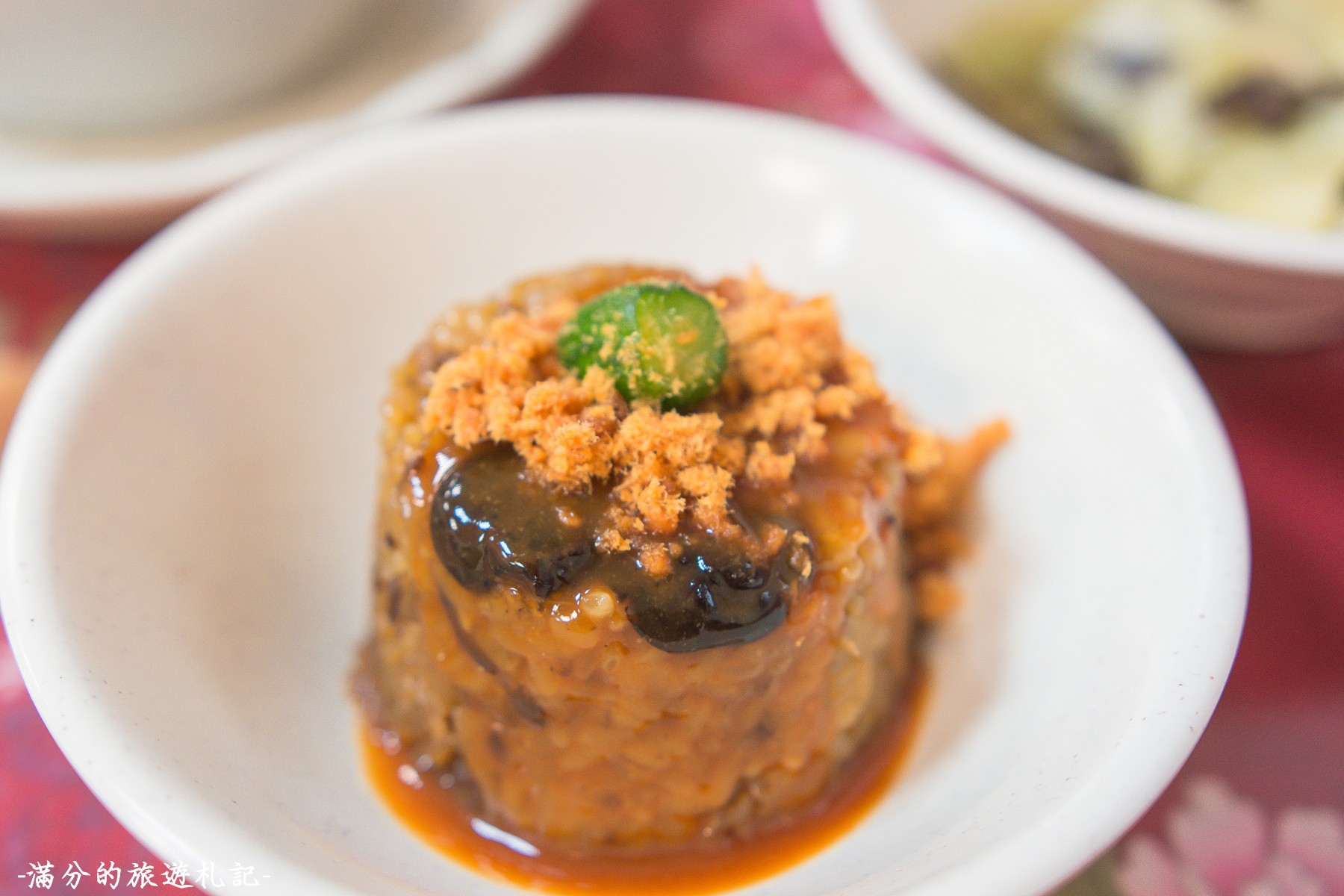
- Tongzi migao in cylindrical shape after coming out of the bamboo tube
- Region or state: Taiwan
- Associated cuisine: Taiwan
- Main ingredients: glutinous rice, shiitake, minced pork, shallots, and eggs

Tube rice pudding (Chinese: 筒仔米糕; pinyin: Tǒng zǐ mǐ gāo; Pe̍h-ōe-jī: tâng-á-bí-ko) is a Taiwanese dish consisting of a stir-fried glutinous rice mixture that is seasoned and steamed in a bamboo tube. Tube rice pudding is a cylindrical shape caused by the steaming process in a tube. Though regionally variable, the dish is typically served with shiitake, minced pork, shallots, and complemented by sweet chili sauce. The dish is considered one of the national dishes of Taiwan and was featured on the 40 of the best Taiwanese foods and drinks by CNN Travel.

== Gallery ==
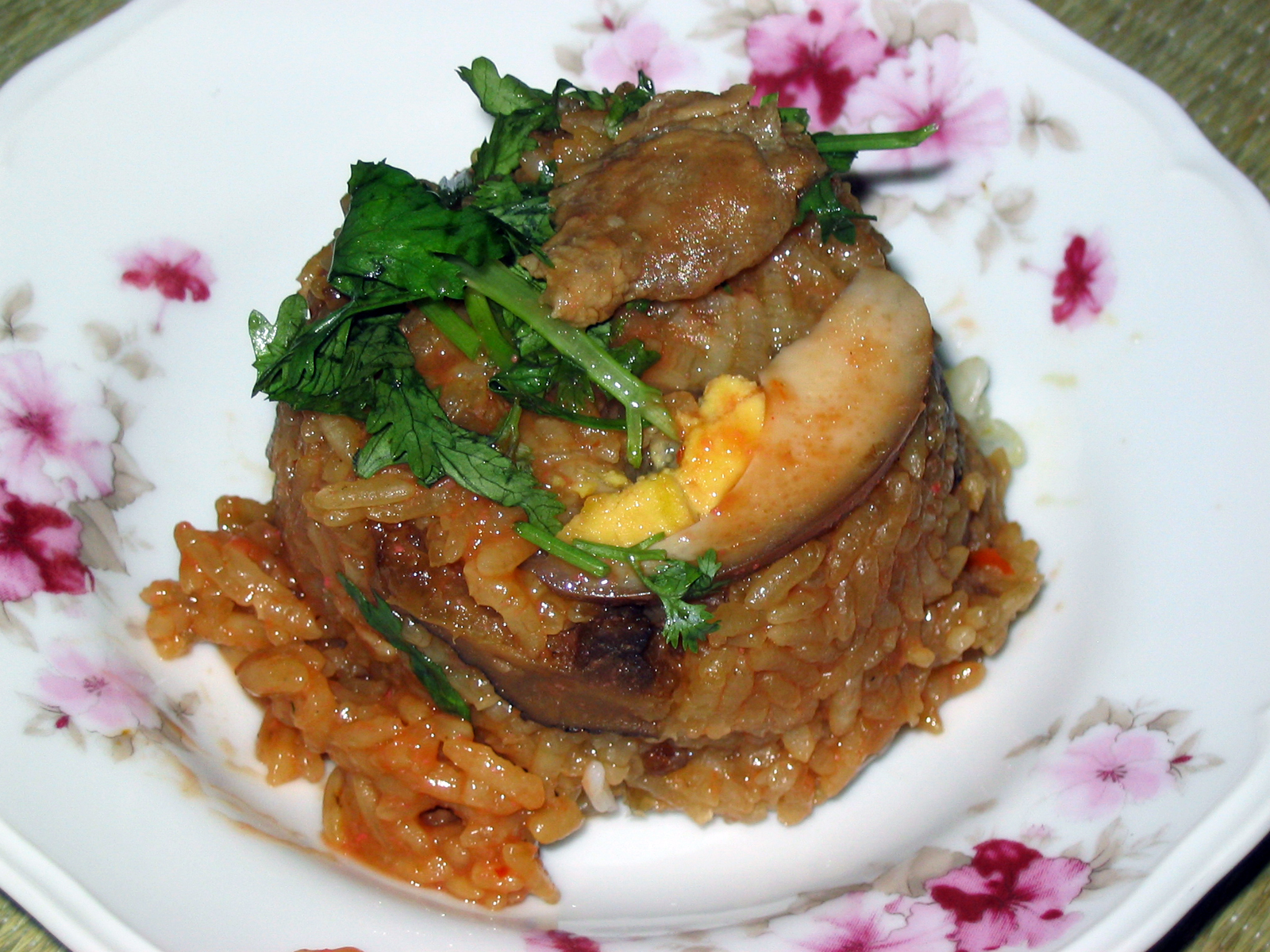

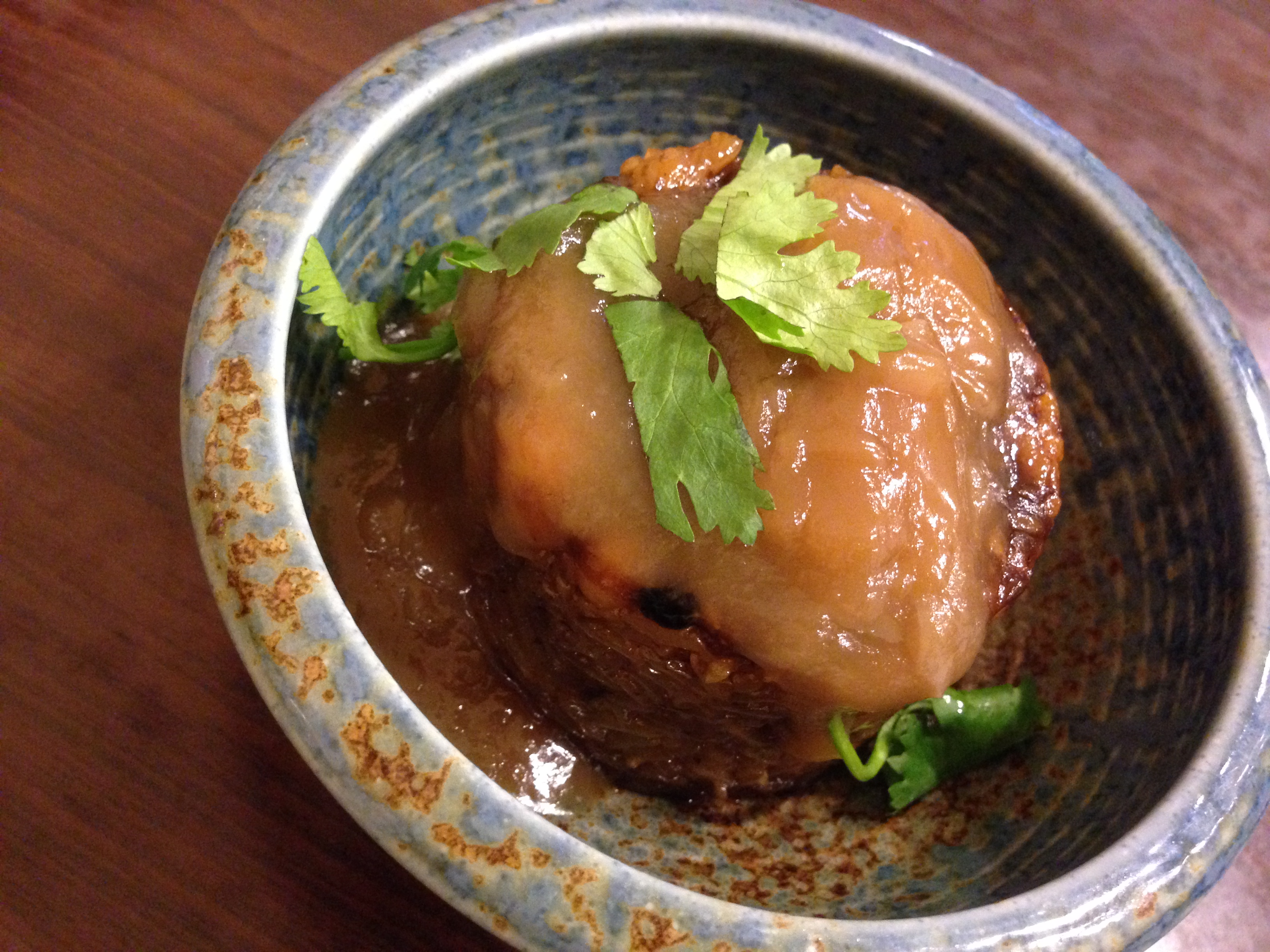

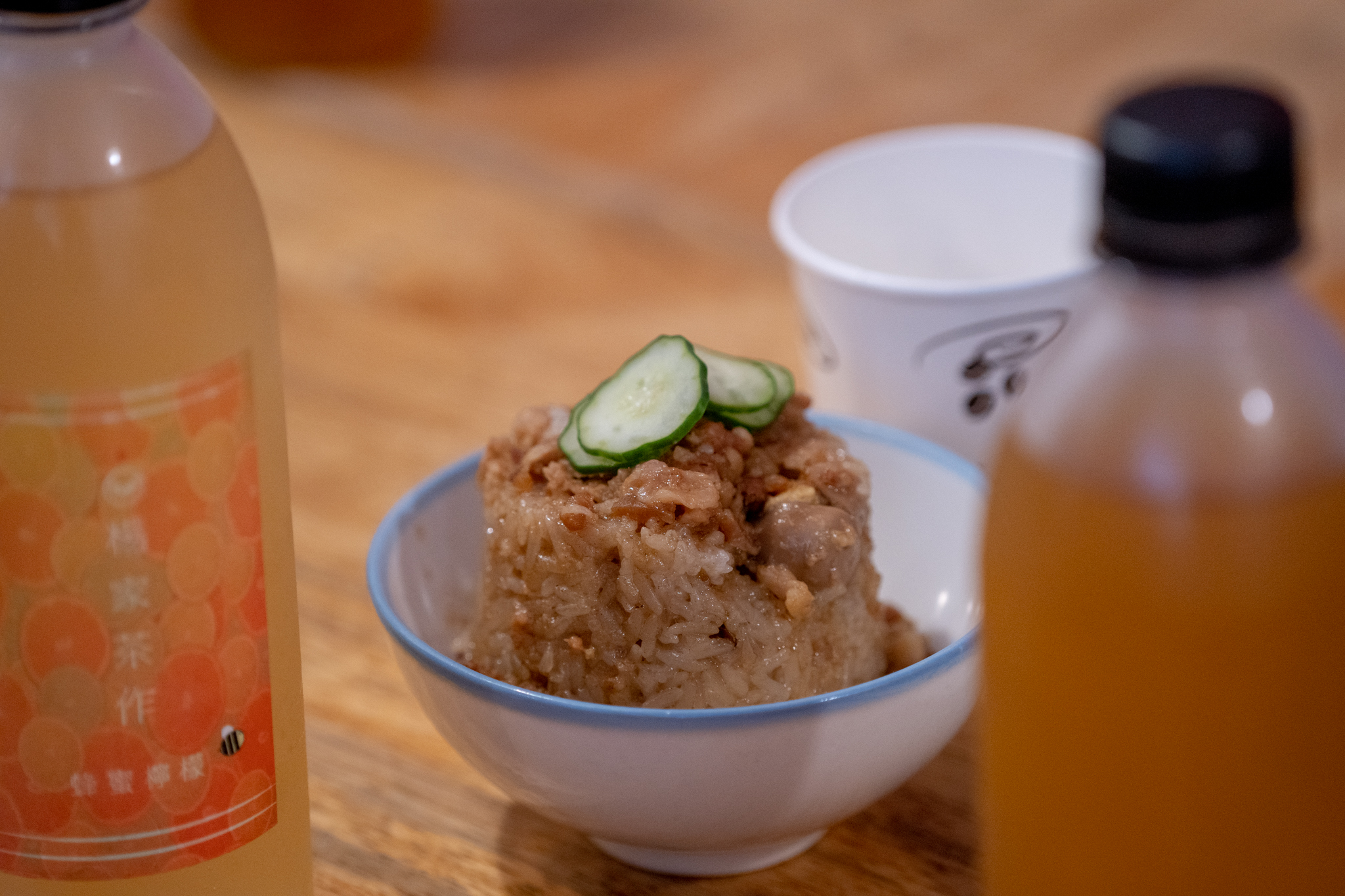

== See also ==
- Taiwanese cuisine
- Taiwanese turkey rice
- Coffin bread
