= Aozihdi metro station =

Metro station in Kaohsiung, Taiwan

Aozihdi R13 凹子底
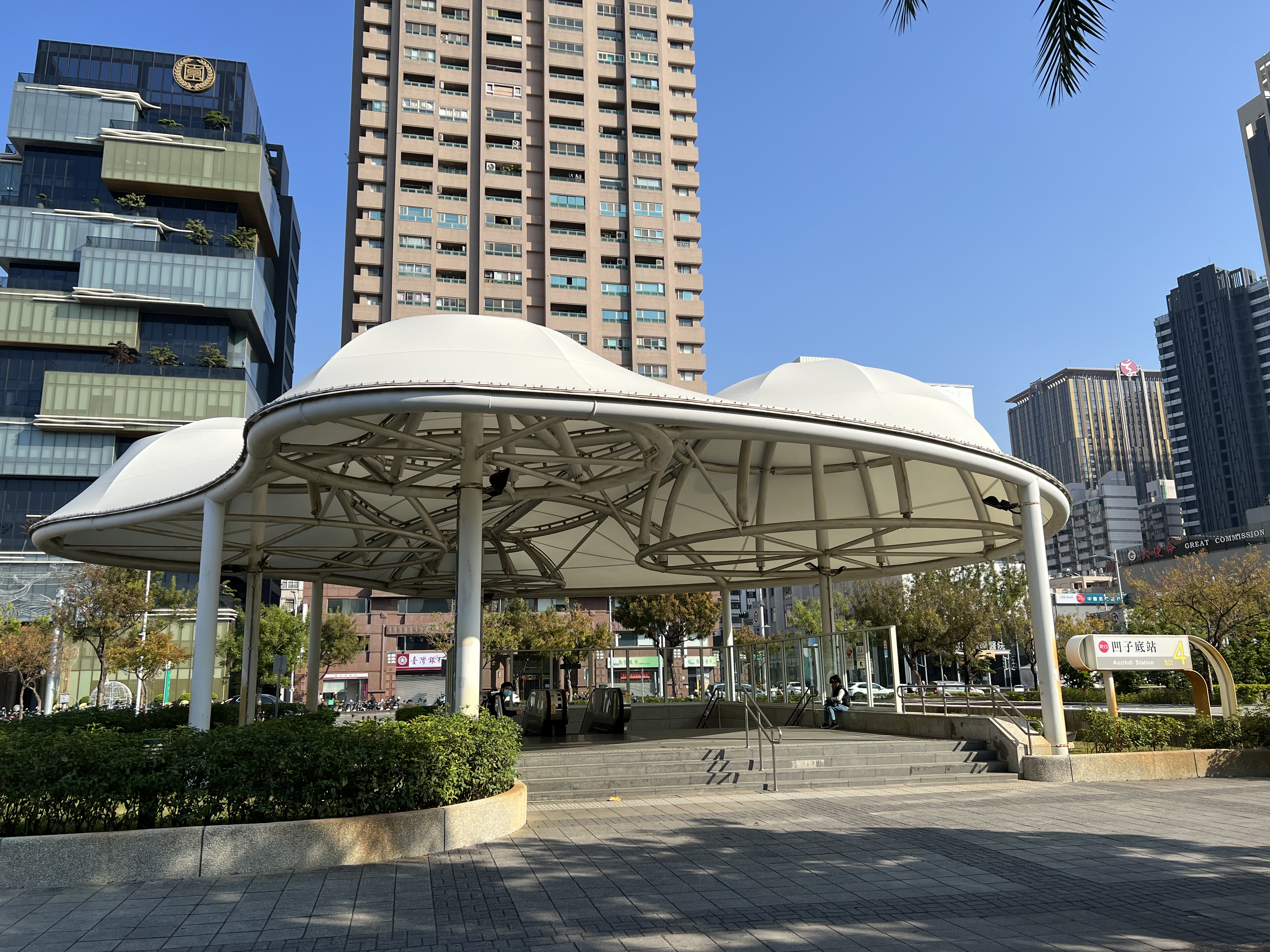
- Aozihdi station exit 4

Chinese name
- Traditional Chinese: 凹子底車站
- Simplified Chinese: 凹子底车站
Transcriptions
Standard Mandarin
- Hanyu Pinyin: Aòzǐdǐ Chēzhàn
- Bopomofo: ㄠˋ ㄗˇ ㄉㄧˇ ㄔㄜ ㄓㄢˋ
- Wade–Giles: Ao^{4}tzu^{3}ti^{3} Ch'ê^{1}-chan^{4}
- Tongyong Pinyin: Aòzǐhdǐ Chejhàn

General information
- Location: Zuoying and Gushan, Kaohsiung; Taiwan
- Coordinates: 22°39′27″N 120°18′11″E
- Operated by: Kaohsiung Rapid Transit Corporation
- Line: Red line (R13)
- Platforms: One island platform

Construction
- Structure type: Underground

History
- Opened: 2008-03-09

Passengers
- 7,316 daily (Jan. 2011)

Services
Preceding station	Kaohsiung Metro	Following station
Kaohsiung Arena towards Gangshan	Red line	Houyi towards Siaogang
Location

Aozihdi is a station on the Red line of Kaohsiung MRT at the edge of Zuoying District and Gushan District, Kaohsiung, Taiwan. The name comes from lap-a-té (漯仔底), which is an old name of this area.

== History ==
The station was opened on 9 March 2008.

== Station overview ==
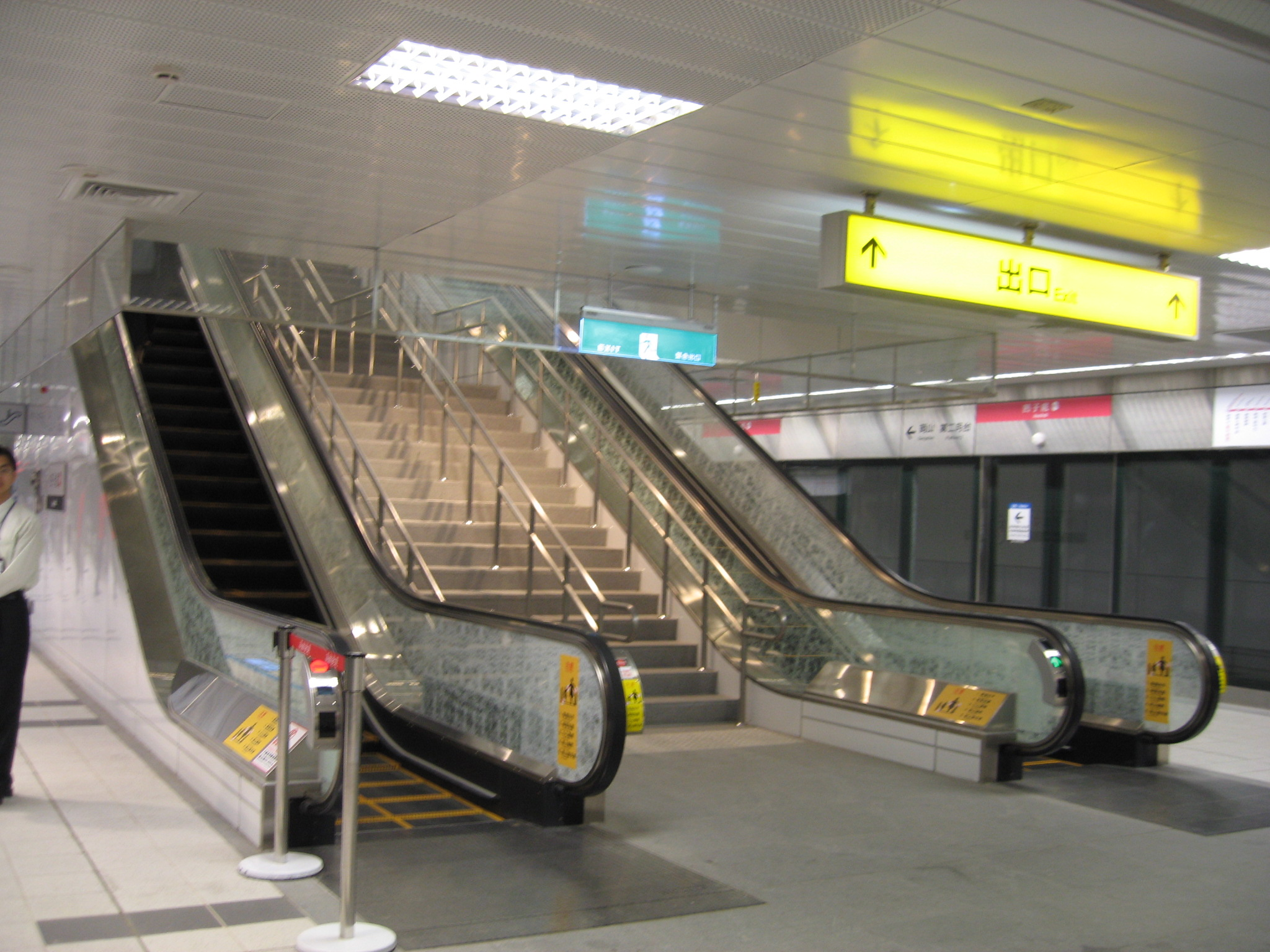
Escalators leading to the platform of Aozihdi station

This is a two-level, underground station with an island platform and four exits. It is 217 meters long and is located at the intersection of Bo-ai 1st Rd. and Dashun Rd.

== Around the station ==
- Circular light rail Heart of Love River light rail station
- Longhua Elementary School
- The Heart of the Love River
- "Agriculture 16" secondary city center
- Shopping district along Migcheng Road
