= Ecological District metro station =

Metro station in Zuoying, Kaohsiung, Taiwan

Ecological District R15 生態園區
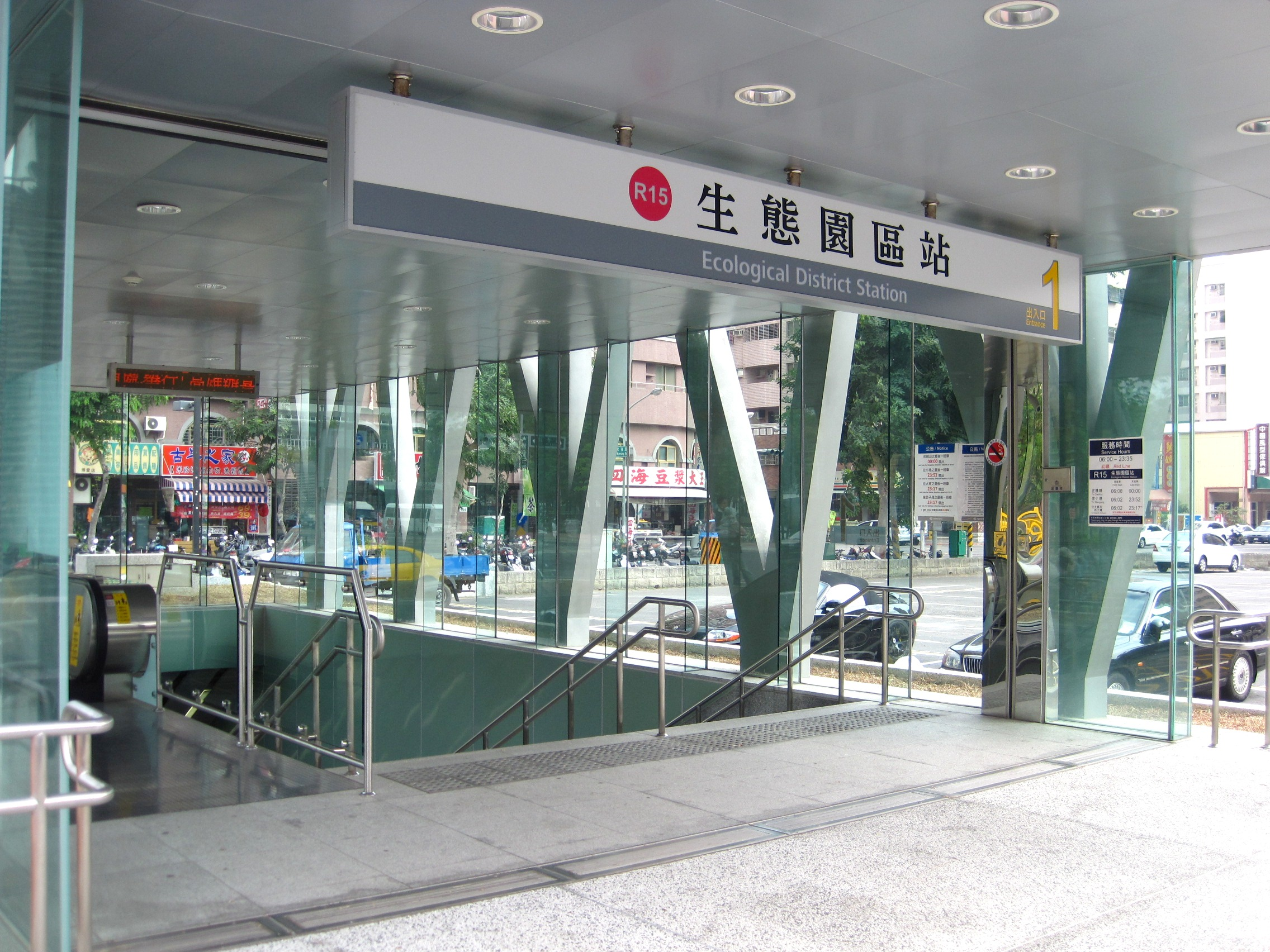
- Ecological District station exit 1

Chinese name
- Traditional Chinese: 生態園區車站
- Simplified Chinese: 生态园区车站
Transcriptions
Standard Mandarin
- Hanyu Pinyin: Shēngtaì Yuánqū Chēzhàn
- Bopomofo: ㄕㄥ ㄊㄞˋ ㄩㄢˊ ㄑㄩ ㄔㄜ ㄓㄢˋ
- Wade–Giles: Sheng^{1}tai-^{4} Yuan^{2}chu^{1} Ch'ê^{1}-chan^{4}

General information
- Location: Zuoying, Kaohsiung; Taiwan
- Coordinates: 22°40′36″N 120°18′24″E
- Operated by: Kaohsiung Rapid Transit Corporation
- Line: Red line (R15)
- Platforms: 1 island platform

Construction
- Structure type: Underground

History
- Opened: 2008-03-09

Passengers
- 5,721 daily (Jan. 2011)

Services
Preceding station	Kaohsiung Metro	Following station
Zuoying towards Gangshan	Red line	Kaohsiung Arena towards Siaogang
Location

Ecological District is a station on the Red line of Kaohsiung MRT in Zuoying District, Kaohsiung, Taiwan.

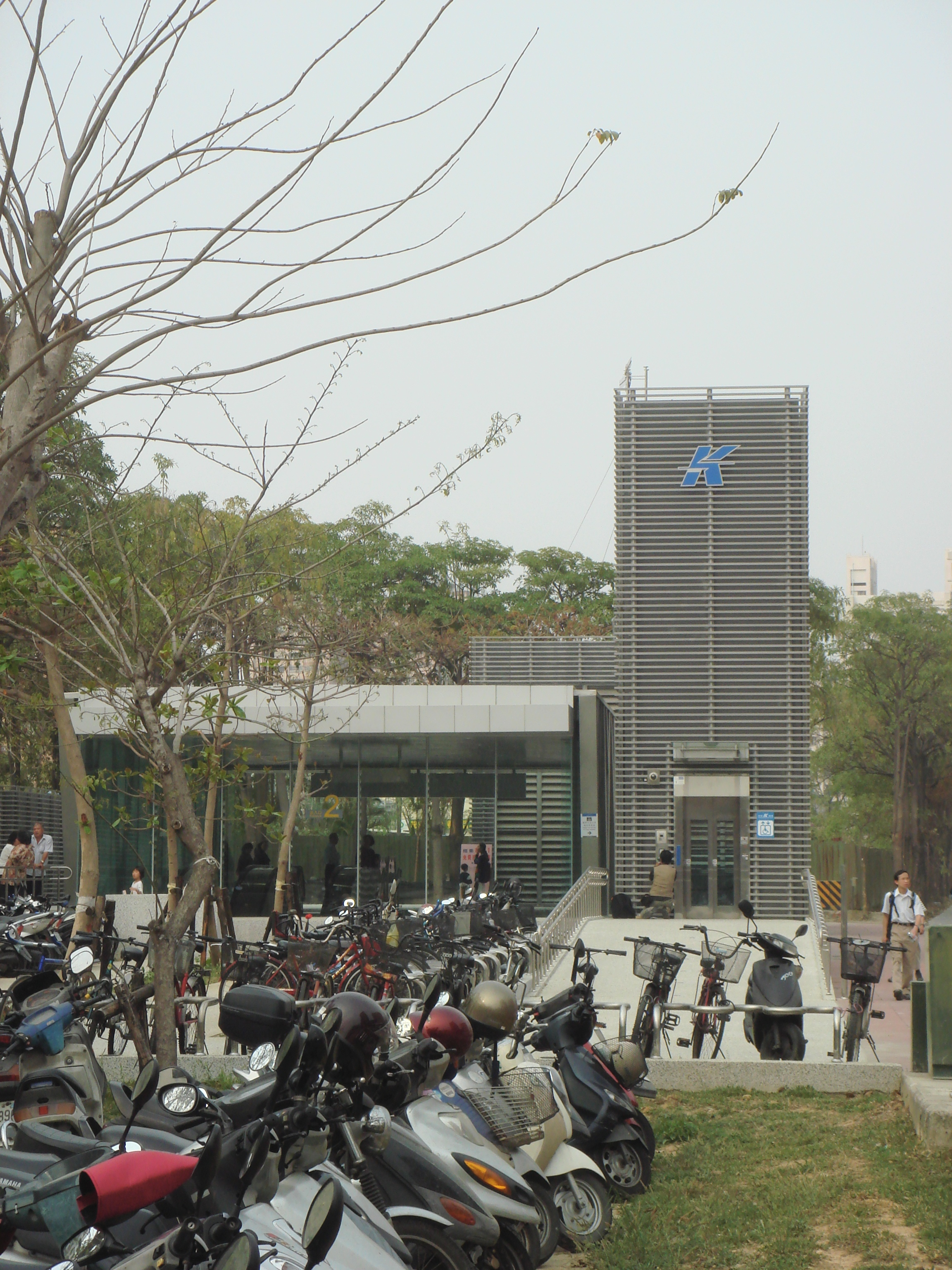
Accessibility elevator of Ecological District station

This is a two-level, underground station with an island platform and two exits. It is 188 metres long and is located at the intersection of Bo-ai 3rd Rd. and Mengzih Rd., near Bo-ai Park.

== Around the station ==
- Kaohsiung Veterans General Hospital
- Zhouzai Wetland Park
- Bo-ai Park (Botanical Garden)
- Singuang Elementary School
