= Tower of Light =

Transmission tower in Sanmin, Kaohsiung, Taiwan

Tower of Light 光之塔
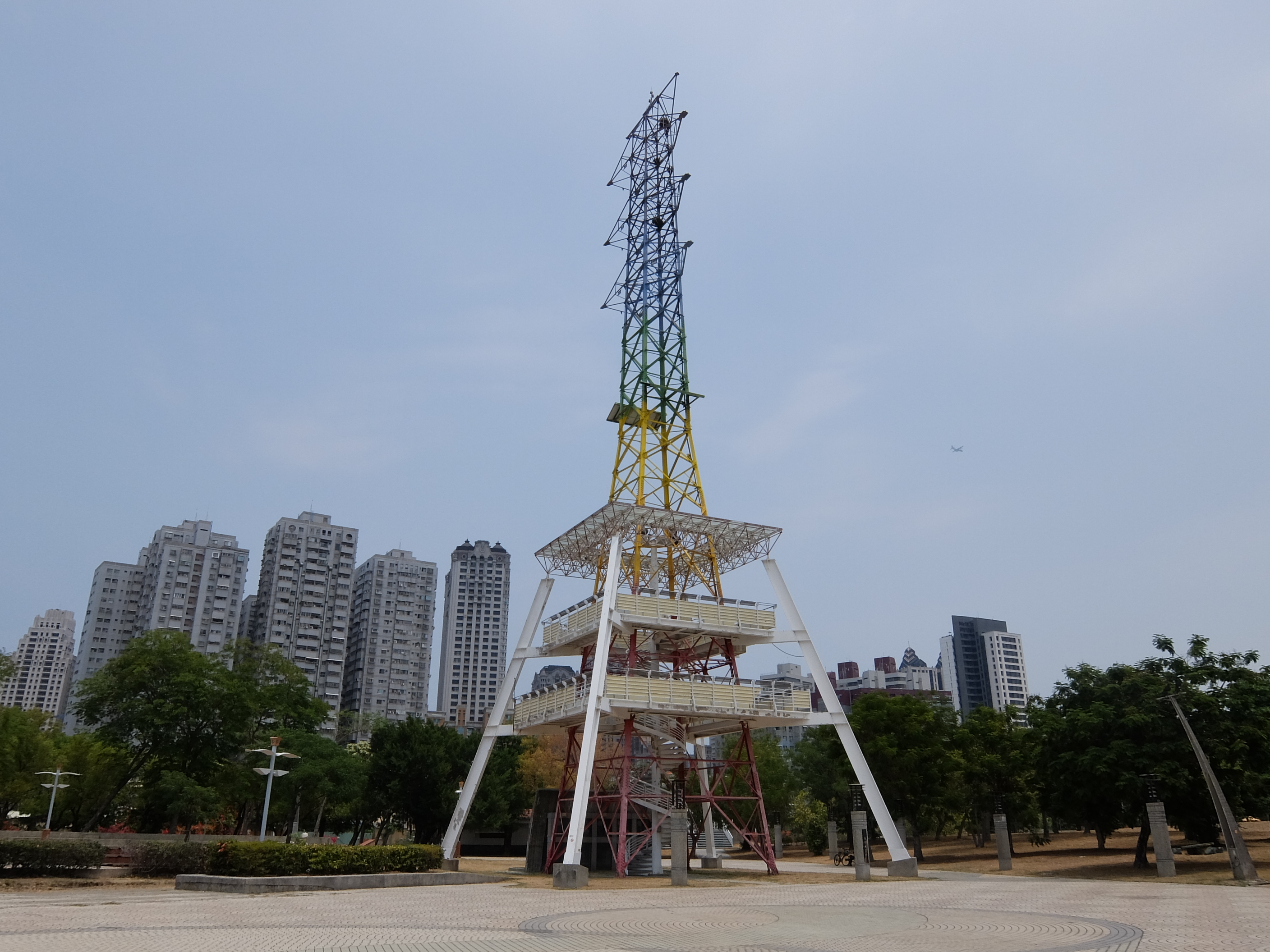

Location
- Coordinates: 22°39′05.3″N 120°17′46.8″E

Ownership information
- Owner: Kaohsiung City Government

Technical information
- Type: transmission tower
- No. of towers: 1

The Tower of Light (Chinese: 光之塔; pinyin: Guāngzhītǎ) is a former transmission tower in Sanmin District, Kaohsiung, Taiwan.

== History ==
The tower was originally used by Taipower as high voltage transmission tower. With the construction of underground power cable, the tower was on the brink of being scrapped. The Kaohsiung City Government then actively persuaded Taipower to retain one tower for commemorative purpose. After successfully lobbying for a budget of NT$40 million, ecological concepts were incorporated into the design to use solar power to illuminate the tower.

== Architecture ==
The tower also features a display of various sizes of insulators and a small climbing wall at its side.

== Transportation ==
The tower is accessible within walking distance west of Houyi Station of Kaohsiung Metro.

== See also ==
- List of tourist attractions in Taiwan
- Electricity sector in Taiwan
