= List of railway and metro stations in Taiwan =

There are currently six operating railway systems in Taiwan:

Name	Chinese	Mandarin (Pinyin)	Taiwanese (Pe̍h-ōe-jī)	Hakka (Pha̍k-fa-sṳ)	Service type	Year opened	No. of stations
Taiwan Railway	臺灣鐵路	Táiwān Tiělù	Tâi-oân Thih-lō͘	Thòi-vân Thiet-lu	Inter-city rail, commuter rail	1891	239
Alishan Forest Railway	阿里山 林業鐵路	Ālǐshān; Línyè Tiělù	A-lí-san; Lîm-gia̍p Thih-lō͘	Â-lî-sân; Lìm-ngia̍p Thiet-lu	Commuter rail	1912	22
Taipei Metro	臺北捷運	Táiběi Jiéyùn	Tâi-pak Chia̍t-ūn	Thòi-pet Chia̍p-yun	Rapid transit	1996	117
Taiwan High Speed Rail	台灣高鐵	Táiwān Gāotiě	Tâi-ôan Ko-thih	Thòi-vàn Kaû-thiet	Inter-city rail, high-speed rail	2007	12
Kaohsiung Rapid Transit	高雄捷運	Gāoxióng Jiéyùn	Ko-hiông Chia̍t-ūn	Kô-hiùng Chhia̍p-yun	Rapid transit	2008	52
Taoyuan Metro	桃園捷運	Táoyuán Jiéyùn	Thô-hn̂g Chia̍t-ūn	Thò-yèn Chhia̍p-yun	Rapid transit	2017	21

The two Inter-city rail systems, Taiwan Railway and Taiwan High Speed Rail, have several overlaps in station names. See below Taiwan High Speed Rail section for their relations in detail.

There are five rapid transit systems in Taiwan:

- Taipei Metro, opened in March 1996, serves the core of Taipei–Keelung metropolitan area.
- Kaohsiung Metro, opened in March 2008, serves the core of Kaohsiung metropolitan area.
- Taoyuan Metro, opened in March 2017, connects the cores of Taipei and Taoyuan with Taoyuan International Airport.
- New Taipei Metro, opened in December 2018, serves the Danhai New Town and New Taipei
- Taichung MRT, opened in April 2021, serves the core of Taichung–Changhua metropolitan area.

The Alishan Forest Railway is currently administered by Forestry Bureau as a heritage railway for tourists in Alishan National Scenic Area.

Taiwan Railway

Taiwan High Speed Rail

Kaohsiung Rapid Transit System

Taipei Metro

Station names in Taiwan are in Wade–Giles for major stations and in Hanyu Pinyin for other minor stations. Exceptions exist in Kaohsiung Metro, which uses Tongyong Pinyin in general. Other romanization systems also exists in some cases for private property or traditional place names. The law of Taiwan also requires all notifications in public transportation systems including station names shall be made in Mandarin, Taiwanese Hokkien, and Hakka.

== Taiwan Railway ==
The Taiwan Railway is operated by the governmental official Taiwan Railway Corporation. It consists of the following lines:

- Western main line: including West Coast line, Taichung line and Pingtung line
- Eastern main line: including Yilan line, North-link line and Taitung line
- South-link line
- Branch lines: Pingxi line, Neiwan line, Liujia line, Jiji line, Shalun line, Shen'ao line

Stations with special and first classes are shown in bold.

=== Operating stations ===
Name	Chinese	Taiwanese	Hakka	Line
Badouzi	八斗子	Pat-táu-chí	Pat-teú-chṳ́	Shen'ao
Badu	八堵	Peh-tó͘	Pat-tú	West Coast/Yilan
Baifu	百福	Pah-hok	Pak-fuk	West Coast
Baishatun	白沙屯	Pe̍h-soa-tūn	Pha̍k-sâ-thûn	West Coast
Balin	拔林	Pa̍t-á-nâ	Pha̍t-lìm	West Coast
**Banqiao**	板橋	Pang-kiô	Piông-khièu	West Coast
Bao'an	保安	Pó-an	Pó-ôn	West Coast
Beihu	北湖	Pak-ô͘	Pet-fù	West Coast
Beipu	北埔	Pak-po͘	Pet-phû	North-link
Central Signal	中央號誌	Tiong-iong Hō-chì	Tûng-ông Ho-chì	South-link
**Changhua**	彰化	Chiong-hoà	Chông-fa	West Coast/Taichung
Chang Jung Christian University	長榮大學	Tióng-êng Tāi-ha̍k	Chhòng-yùng Thai-ho̍k	Shalun
**Chaozhou**	潮州	Tiô-chiu	Chheù-chû	Pingtung
Checheng	車埕	Chhia-tiâⁿ	Chhâ-chhâng	Jiji
Chenggong	成功	Sêng-kong	Sṳ̀n-kûng	Taichung
**Chiayi**	嘉義	Ka-gī	Kâ-ngi	West Coast
Chishang	池上	Tî-siōng	Chhṳ̀-sông	Taitung
Chongde	崇德	Chông-tek	Chhùng-tet	North-link
Dacun	大村	Tāi-chhoan	Thai-chhûn	West Coast
Dadu	大肚	Tōa-tō͘	Thai-tú	West Coast
Dafu	大富	Tāi-hô	Thai-fu	Taitung
Dahu	大湖	Tōa-ô͘	Thai-fù	West Coast
Dahua	大華	Tāi-hôa	Thai-fà	Pingxi
Dajia	大甲	Tāi-kah	Thai-kap	West Coast
Dali	大里	Tāi-lí	Thai-lî	Yilan
Dalin	大林	Tōa-nâ	Thai-lìm	West Coast
Daqiao	大橋	Tōa-kiô	Thai-khiâu	West Coast
Dashan	大山	Tōa-soaⁿ	Thai-sân	West Coast
Daqing	大慶	Tāi-khèng	Thai-khin	Taichung
Dawu	大武	Tāi-bú	Thai-vú	South-link
Daxi	大溪	Tāi-khe	Thai-hâi	Yilan
Dingpu	頂埔	Téng-po͘	Táng-phû	Yilan
Dong'ao	東澳	Tang-ò	Tûng-o	North-link
Donghai	東海	Tang-hái	Tûng-hói	Pingtung
Dongli	東里	Tang-lí	Tûng-lî	Taitung
Dongshan	冬山	Tang-soaⁿ	Tûng-sân	Yilan
Dongzhu	東竹	Tang-tek	Tûng-chuk	Taitung
**Douliu**	斗六	Táu-la̍k	Teú-liuk	West Coast
Dounan	斗南	Táu-lâm	Teú-nàm	West Coast
Erjie	二結	Jī-kiat	Ngi-kiet	Yilan
Ershui	二水	Jī-chúi	Ngi-súi	West Coast/Jiji
Fangliao	枋寮	Pang-liâu	Piông-liàu	Pingtung/South-link
Fangshan	枋山	Pang-soaⁿ	Piông-sân	South-link
Fangye	枋野	Pang-iá	Piông-yâ	South-link
Fengfu	豐富	Hong-hù	Fûng-fu	Taichung
Fenglin	鳳林	Hōng-lîm	Fung-lìm	Taitung
Fongshan	鳳山	Hōng-soaⁿ	Fung-sân	Pingtung
Fengtian	豐田	Hong-tiân	Fûng-thièn	Taitung
**Fengyuan**	豐原	Hong-goân	Fûng-ngièn	Taichung
Fugang	富岡	Hù-kong	Fu-kông	West Coast
Fugui	富貴	Hù-kuì	Fu-kui	Neiwan
Fuli	富里	Hù-lí	Fu-lî	Taitung
Fulong	福隆	Hok-liông	Fuk-lùng	Yilan
Fuyuan	富源	Hù-goân	Fu-ngièn	Taitung
Fuzhou	浮洲	Phû-chiu	Feù-chû	West Coast
**Gangshan**	岡山	Kong-san	Kông-sân	West Coast
Gongliao	貢寮	Kòng-liâu	Kung-liàu	Yilan
Guangfu	光復	Kong-ho̍k	Kông-fu̍k	Taitung
Guanshan	關山	Koan-san	Koân-sân	Taitung
Guilai	歸來	Kui-lâi	Kûi-lòi	Pingtung
Guishan	龜山	Ku-soaⁿ	Kûi-sân	Yilan
Gushan	鼓山	Kó͘-san	Kú-sân	West Coast
Guzhuang Signal	古莊號誌	Kó͘-chng Hō-chì	Kú-chông Hō-chì	South-link
Haiduan	海端	Hái-toan	Gói-tôn	Taitung
Haikeguan	海科館	Hái-kho-koán	Hói-khô-kón	Shen'ao
Hanben	漢本	Hàn-pún	Hon-pún	North-link
Hengshan	橫山	Hoâiⁿ-soaⁿ	Vàng-sân	Neiwan
Heping	和平	Hô-pêng	Fò-phìn	North-link
Heren	和仁	Hô-jîn	Fò-yìn	North-link
Hexing	合興	Ha̍p-heng	Ha̍p-hîn	Neiwan
Houbi	後壁	Āu-piah	Heu-piak	West Coast
Houli	后里	Āu-lí	Heu-lî	Taichung
Houlong	後龍	Āu-lâng	Heu-liùng	West Coast
Houtong	猴硐	Kâu-tōng-á	Heù-thung	Yilan
Houzhuang	後庄	Āu-chng	Heu-chông	Pingtung
**Hsinchu**	新竹	Sin-tek	Sîn-chuk	West Coast/Neiwan
**Hualien**	花蓮	Hoa-liân	Fâ-lièn	North-link/Taitung
Huatan	花壇	Hoe-toâⁿ	Fâ-thàn	West Coast
Hukou	湖口	Ô͘-kháu	Fù-khiéu	West Coast
Jiabei	嘉北	Ka-pak	Kâ-pet	West Coast
Ji'an	吉安	Kiat-an	Kit-ôn	Taitung
Jiadong	佳冬	Ka-tang	Kâ-tûng	Pingtung
Jialu	加祿	Ka-lo̍k	Kâ-luk	South-link
Jiaoxi	礁溪	Ta-khe	Chiau-hâi	Yilan
Jiji	集集	Chi̍p-chi̍p	Si̍p-si̍p	Jiji
Jingmei	景美	Kéng-bí	Kín-mî	North-link
Jingtong	菁桐	Chheⁿ-tông	Chiâng-thùng	Pingxi
Jingwu	精武	Cheng-bú	Chîn-vú	Taichung
Jinlun	金崙	Kim-lun	Kîm-lûn	South-link
Jiuqutang	九曲堂	Kiú-khiok-tông	Kiú-khiuk-thòng	Pingtung
Jiuzantou	九讚頭	Káu-chàn-thâu	Kiú-chan-theù	Neiwan
Kanding	崁頂	Khàm-téng	Kham-táng	Pingtung
Kangle	康樂	Khong-lo̍k	Không-lo̍k	South-link
**Kaohsiung**	高雄	Ko-hiông	Kô-hiùng	West Coast/Pingtung
**Keelung**	基隆	Ke-lâng	Kî-lùng	West Coast
Lilin	栗林	Lek-lîm	Li̍t-lìm	Taichung
Linbian	林邊	Nâ-piⁿ	Lìm-piên	Pingtung
Linfengying	林鳳營	Lîm-hōng-iâⁿ	Lìm-fung-yàng	West Coast
Lingjiao	嶺腳	Niá-kha	Liâng-kiok	Pingxi
Linluo	麟洛	Lîn-lo̍k	Lìm-lo̍k	Pingtung
Linnei	林內	Nâ-lāi	Lìm-nui	West Coast
Linrong Shin Kong	林榮新光	Lîm-êng Sin-kong	Lìm-yùng Sîn-kông	Taitung
Liujia	六家	Lio̍k-ka	Liuk-kâ	Liujia
Liukuaicuo	六塊厝	La̍k-tè-chhù	Liuk-khoài-chhṳ̀	Pingtung
Liuying	柳營	Liú-iâⁿ	Liú-yàng	West Coast
Longgang	龍港	Lêng-káng	Liùng-kóng	West Coast
Longjing	龍井	Liông-chéⁿ	Liùng-chiáng	West Coast
Longquan	龍泉	Lêng-choâⁿ	Liùng-chhièn	Jiji
Longtian	隆田	Liông-tiân	Lùng-thièn	West Coast
Longxi	瀧溪	Liông-khe	Lùng-hâi	South-link
Luodong	羅東	Lô-tong	Lò-tûng	Yilan
Luye	鹿野	Lo̍k-iá	Lu̍k-yâ	Taitung
Luzhu	路竹	Lō͘-tek	Lu-chuk	West Coast
**Miaoli**	苗栗	Biâu-le̍k	Mèu-li̍t	Taichung
Minxiong	民雄	Bîn-hiông	Mìn-hiùng	West Coast
Minzu	民族	Bîn-cho̍k	Mìn-chhu̍k	Pingtung
Mudan	牡丹	Bó͘-tan	Meú-Tân	Yilan
Museum of Fine Arts	美術館	Bí-su̍t-koán	Mî-su̍t-kón	West Coast
Nan'ao	南澳	Lâm-ò	Nàm-o	North-link
**Nangang**	南港	Lâm-káng	Nàm-kóng	West Coast
Nanjing	南靖	Lâm-chēng	Nàm-chhìn	West Coast
Nanke	南科	Lâm-kho	Nàm-khô	West Coast
Nanping	南平	Lâm-pêng	Nàm-phìn	Taitung
Nanshi	南勢	Lâm-sì	Nàm-sṳ	Taichung
Nanzhou	南州	Lâm-chiu	Nàm-chû	Pingtung
Nanzi	楠梓	Lâm-á-kheⁿ	Nâm-chṳ́	West Coast
Neili	內壢	Lāi-le̍k	Nui-la̍k	West Coast
Neishi	內獅	Lāi-sai	Nui-sṳ̂	South-link
Neiwan	內灣	Lāi-oan	Nui-vân	Neiwan
Neiwei	內惟	Lāi-ûi	Nui-vì	West Coast
North Hsinchu	北新竹	Pak Sin-tek	Pet Sîn-chuk	West Coast/Neiwan
Nuannuan	暖暖	Loán-loán	Nôn-nôn	Yilan
Pinghe	平和	Pêng-hô	Phìn-fò	Taitung
**Pingtung**	屏東	Pîn-tong	Phìn-tûng	Pingtung
Pingxi	平溪	Pêng-khe	Phìn-hâi	Pingxi
Puxin	埔心	Po͘-sim	Pu-sîm	West Coast
Qianjia	千甲	Chhian-kah	Chhiên-kap	Neiwan
Qiaotou	橋頭	Kiô-á-thâu	Khiâu-thèu	West Coast
Qiding	崎頂	Kiā-téng	Khi-táng	West Coast
**Qidu**	七堵	Chhit-tó͘	Chhit-tú	West Coast
Qingshui	清水	Chheng-chúi	Chhîn-súi	West Coast
Rende	仁德	Jîn-tek	Yìn-tet	West Coast
Rinan	日南	Ji̍t-lâm	Ngit-nàm	West Coast
Ronghua	榮華	Êng-hôa	Yùng-fà	Neiwan
**Ruifang**	瑞芳	Sūi-hong	Lui-fông	Yilan/Shen'ao
Ruihe	瑞和	Suī-hô	Lui-fò	Taitung
Ruisui	瑞穗	Sūi-sūi	Lui-sui	Taitung
Ruiyuan	瑞源	Suī-goân	Lui-ngièn	Taitung
Sandiaoling	三貂嶺	Sam-tiau-niá	Sâm-tiau-liâng	Yilan/Pingxi
Sankeng	三坑	Sann-khenn-á	Sâm-hâng	West Coast
Sankuaicuo	三塊厝	Saⁿ-tè-chhù	Sân-khoài-chhṳ̀	West Coast
Sanmin	三民	Sam-bîn	Sâm-mìn	Taitung
Sanxingqiao	三姓橋	Saⁿ-sèⁿ-kiô	Sâm-siang-khiâu	West Coast
Sanyi	三義	Sam-gī	Sâm-ngi	Taichung
Science and Technology Museum	科工館	Kho-kang-koán	Khô-kûng-kón	Pingtung
Shalu	沙鹿	Soa-lak	Sâ-lu̍k	West Coast
Shalun	沙崙	Soa-lūn	Sâ-lûn	Shalun
Shangyuan	上員	Siōng-goân	Sông-yèn	Neiwan
Shanhua	善化	Siān-hòa	San-fa	West Coast
Shanjia	山佳	Soaⁿ-á-kha	Sân-kâ	West Coast
Shanli	山里	San-lí	Sân-lî	Taitung
Shetou	社頭	Siā-thâu	Sa-theù	West Coast
Shicheng	石城	Chio̍h-siâⁿ	Sa̍k-sàng	Yilan
Shifen	十分	Cha̍p-hūn	Sṳ̍p-fûn	Pingxi
Shigui	石龜	Chio̍h-ku	Sa̍k-kuî	West Coast
Shiliu	石榴	Sia̍h-liû-pan	Sa̍k-liû	West Coast
Shoufeng	壽豐	Siū-hong	Su-fûng	Taitung
Shuangxi	雙溪	Siang-khe	Sûng-hâi	Yilan
Shuili	水里	Chúi-lí	Súi-lî	Jiji
Shuishang	水上	Chúi-siōng	Súi-sông	West Coast
**Shulin**	樹林	Chhiū-nâ	Su-lìm	West Coast
Sicheng	四城	Sì-siâⁿ	Si-sàng	Yilan
Sijiaoting	四腳亭	Sì-kha-têng	Si-kiok-thìn	Yilan
**Songshan**	松山	Siông-san	Chhiùng-sân	West Coast
Songzhu	松竹	Siông-tek	Chhiùng-chuk	Taichung
South Shulin	南樹林	Lâm-chhiū-nâ	Nàm Su-lìm	West Coast
Su'ao	蘇澳	So͘-ò	Sû-o	Yilan
**Su'aoxin**	蘇澳新	So͘-ò Sin	Sû-o Sîn	Yilan/North-link
Tai'an	泰安	Thài-an	Thai-ôn	Taichung
**Taichung**	臺中	Tâi-tiong	Thòi-chûng	Taichung
Taichung Port	臺中港	Tâi-tiong-káng	Thòi-chûng-kóng	West Coast
Taimali	太麻里	Thài-mâ-lí	Thai-mà-lî	South-link
**Tainan**	臺南	Tâi-lâm	Thòi-nàm	West Coast
**Taipei**	臺北	Tâi-pak	Thòi-pet	West Coast
**Taitung**	臺東	Tâi-tang	Thòi-tûng	Taitung/South-link
Taiyuan	太原	Thài-goân	Thai-ngièn	Taichung
Tanwen	談文	Tâm-bûn	Thàm-vùn	West Coast
Tanzi	潭子	Thâm-chú	Thâm-chṳ́	Taichung
**Taoyuan**	桃園	Thô-hn̂g	Thò-yèn	West Coast
Tianzhong	田中	Tiân-tiong	Thièn-chûng	West Coast
Tongluo	銅鑼	Tâng-lô	Thùng-lò	Taichung
Tongxiao	通霄	Thong-siau	Thûng-siau	West Coast
Toucheng	頭城	Thâu-siâⁿ	Theù-sàng	Yilan
Toujiacuo	頭家厝	Thâu-ke-chhù	Thèu-kâ-chhṳ̀	Taichung
Wai'ao	外澳	Goā-ò	Ngoi-o	Yilan
Wanggu	望古	Bāng-kó͘	Mong-kú	Pingxi
**Wanhua**	萬華	Báng-kah	Van-fà	West Coast
Wanrong	萬榮	Bān-êng	Van-yùng	Taitung
Wudu	五堵	Gō͘-tó͘	Ńg-tú	West Coast
Wuquan	五權	Ngō͘-khoân	Ńg-khièn	Taichung
Wuri	烏日	O͘-ji̍t	Vû-ngit	Taichung
Wuta	武塔	Bú-thah	Vú-thap	North-link
Xiangshan	香山	Hiong-san	Hiông-sân	West Coast
Xike	汐科	Se̍k-kho	Sip-khô	West Coast
Xincheng (Taroko)	新城（太魯閣）	Sin-siâⁿ (Thài-ló͘-koh)	Sîn-sàng (Thai-lû-kok)	North-link
Xinfeng	新豐	Sin-hong	Sîn-fûng	West Coast
Xinfu	新富	Sin-hù	Sîn-fu	West Coast
Xinma	新馬	Sin-má	Sîn-mâ	Yilan
Xinpu	新埔	Sin-po͘	Sîn-phû	West Coast
Xinshi	新市	Sin-chhī	Sîn-sṳ	West Coast
Xinwuri	新烏日	Sin O͘-ji̍t	Sîn Vû-ngit	Taichung
**Xinying**	新營	Sin-iâⁿ	Sîn-yàng	West Coast
Xinzhuang	新莊	Sin-chng	Sîn-chông	Neiwan
**Xinzuoying**	新左營	Sin-chó-iâⁿ	Sîn-chó-yàng	West Coast
Xishi	西勢	Sai-sì	Sî-sṳ	Pingtung
Xizhi	汐止	Se̍k-chí	Sip-chṳ́	West Coast
Yangmei	楊梅	Iûⁿ-mûi	Yòng-mòi	West Coast
**Yilan**	宜蘭	Gî-lân	Ngì-làn	Yilan
Yingge	鶯歌	Eng-ko	Yîn-kô	West Coast
Yongjing	永靖	Éng-chēng	Yún-chhìn	West Coast
Yongkang	永康	Éng-khong	Yún-không	West Coast
Yongle	永樂	Éng-lo̍k	Yún-lo̍k	North-link
Yuanli	苑裡	Oán-lí	Yén-lî	West Coast
**Yuanlin**	員林	Oân-lîm	Yèn-lìm	West Coast
Yuanquan	源泉	Goân-choâⁿ	Ngièn-chhièn	Jiji
**Yuli**	玉里	Gio̍k-lí	Ngiu̍k-lî	Taitung
Zaoqiao	造橋	Chō-kiô	Chho-khiâu	Taichung
Zhen'an	鎮安	Tìn-an	Chṳ́n-ôn	Pingtung
Zhengyi	正義	Chèng-gī	Chang-ngi	Pingtung
Zhiben	知本	Ti-pún	Tî-pún	South-link
Zhixue	志學	Chì-ha̍k	Chṳ-ho̍k	Taitung
**Zhongli (Taoyuan)**	中壢	Tiong-le̍k	Chûng-la̍k	West Coast
Zhongli (Yilan)	中里	Tiong-lí	Chûng-lî	Yilan
Zhongzhou	中洲	Tiong-chiu	Chûng-chû	West Coast/Shalun
Zhubei	竹北	Tek-pak	Chuk-pet	West Coast
Zhudong	竹東	Tek-tang	Chuk-tûng	Neiwan
Zhuifen	追分	Tui-hun	Tûi-fûn	West Coast
**Zhunan**	竹南	Tek-lâm	Chuk-nàm	West Coast/Taichung
Zhuoshui	濁水	Lô-chúi	Chhu̍k-súi	Jiji
Zhutian	竹田	Tek-chhân	Chuk-thièn	Pingtung
Zhuzhong	竹中	Tek-tiong	Chuk-chûng	Neiwan/Liujia
Zuoying (Jiucheng)	左營（舊城）	Chó-iâⁿ (Kū-siâⁿ)	Chó-yàng (Khiu-sàng)	West Coast

=== Closed stations ===
- Stations on Linkou line:
  - Baoshan
  - Changxing 長興
  - Haihu 海湖
  - Haishan 海山
  - Linkou 林口
  - Nanxiang
  - Taoyuan Senior High School
  - Wufu 五福
- Stations on Former Mountain line:
  - Shengxing
  - Yutengping
  - Tai'an Old
- Duoliang
- Qishan
- Kaohsiung Port 高雄港

== Taiwan High Speed Rail ==
The Taiwan High Speed Rail currently operates 12 stations in western Taiwan:

- Taiwan Railways have a station name identical to THSR in a union station or in nearby places: Banqiao, Nangang, Taipei.
- Taiwan Railways have a station name identical to THSR but in different places: Changhua, Chiayi, Hsinchu, Miaoli, Taichung, Tainan, Taoyuan, Zuoying.

Name	Chinese	Taiwanese	Hakka	Code		Taiwan Railways union station	
Banqiao	板橋	Pang-kiô	Piông-khièu	BAQ	03	Banqiao	板橋
Changhua	彰化	Chiong-hoà	Chông-fa	CHH	08		
Chiayi	嘉義	Ka-gī	Kâ-ngi	CHY	10		
Hsinchu	新竹	Sin-tek	Sîn-chuk	HSC	05	Liujia	六家
Miaoli	苗栗	Biâu-le̍k	Mèu-li̍t	MIL	06	Fengfu	豐富
Nangang	南港	Lâm-káng	Nàm-kóng	NAG	01	Nangang	南港
Taichung	台中	Tâi-tiong	Thòi-chûng	TAC	07	Xinwuri	新烏日
Tainan	台南	Tâi-lâm	Thòi-nàm	TAN	11	Shalun	沙崙
Taipei	台北	Tâi-pak	Thòi-pet	TPE	02	Taipei	臺北
Taoyuan	桃園	Thô-hn̂g	Thò-yèn	TAY	04		
Yunlin	雲林	Hûn-lîm	Yùn-lìm	YUL	09		
Zuoying	左營	Chó-iâⁿ	Chó-yàng	ZUY	12	Xinzuoying	新左營

== Kaohsiung Metro ==
The Kaohsiung Metro consists of three lines: Red line, Orange line, and Circular light rail. There are 52 stations in total on the three lines.

Name	Chinese	Taiwanese	Hakka	Code
Aozihdi	凹子底	Lap-á-té	La̍p-è-tái	R13
Caoya	草衙	Chháu-gê	Chhó-ngâ	R4A
Central Park	中央公園	Tiong-iong Kong-hn̂g	Tûng-ông Kûng-yèn	R9
Cianjhen Senior High School	前鎮高中	Chiân-tìn Ko-tiong	Chhièn-chṳ́n Kô-chûng	R5
Cianjhen Star	前鎮之星	Chiân-tìn chi Seng	Chhièn-chṳ́n chṳ̂ Sên	C3
Cianjin	前金	Tsiân-kim	Chhièn-kîm	O4
Ciaotou	橋頭火車站	Kiô-á-thâu Hóe-chhia-chām	Khiâu-thèu Fó-chhâ-chhàm	R23
Ciaotou Sugar Refinery	橋頭糖廠	Kiô-á-thâu Thn̂g-chhiúⁿ	Khiâu-thèu Thòng-chhòng	R22A
Cingpu	青埔	Chheng-po͘	Chhiâng-pu	R22
Commerce and Trade Park	經貿園區	Keng-bō͘ Hn̂g-khu	Kîn-mo Yèn-khî	C6
Cruise Terminal	旅運中心	Lí-ūn Tiong-sim	Lî-yun Chûng-sîm	C9
Cultural Center	文化中心	Bûn-hoà Tiong-sim	Vùn-fa Chûng-sîm	O7
Dadong	大東	Tāi-tang	Thai-tûng	O13
Daliao	大寮	Toā-liâu	Thai-liâu	OT1
Dayi Pier-2	駁二大義	Pok-jī Tâi-gī	Pok-ngi Thai-ngi	C12
Dream Mall	夢時代	Bāng-sî-tāi	Mung-sṳ̀-thoi	C5
Ecological District	生態園區	Seng-thài Hn̂g-khu	Sâng-thai Yèn-khî	R15
Fongshan	鳳山	Hōng-soaⁿ	Fung-sân	O12
Fongshan Junior High School	鳳山國中	Hōng-soaⁿ Kok-tiong	Fung-sân Koet-chûng	O14
Fongshan West	鳳山西	Hōng-soaⁿ-se-chām	Fung-sân-sî-chhàm	O11
Formosa Boulevard	美麗島	Bí-lē-tó	Mî-li-tó	O5/R10
Gangshan	岡山車站	Kong-san Chhia-chām	Kông-sân Chhâ-chhàm	RK1
Glory Pier	光榮碼頭	Kong-êng Bé-thâu	Kông-yùng Ma-thèu	C10
Hamasen	哈瑪星	Há-má-seng	Hâ-mâ-sên	O1/C14
Houjing	後勁	Āu-ngē	Heu-kín	R20
Houyi	後驛	Āu-ia̍h	Heu-chhàm	R12
Kaisyuan	凱旋	Khái-soân	Khái-siên	R6
Kaisyuan Jhonghua	凱旋中華	Khái-soân Tiong-hôa	Khái-siên Chûng-fà	C4
Kaisyuan Rueitian	凱旋瑞田	Khái-soân Sūi-tiân	Khái-siên Suì-thièn	C2
Kaohsiung Arena	巨蛋	Kī-tàn	Ki-thàn	R14
Kaohsiung Exhibition Center	高雄展覽館	Ko-hiông Tián-lám-koán	Kô-hiùng Chán-lám-kón	C8
Kaohsiung International Airport	高雄國際機場	Ko-hiông Kok-chè Ki-tiûⁿ	Kô-hiùng Koet-chi Kî-chhòng	R4
Kaohsiung Medical University Gangshan Hospital	岡山高醫	Kong-san Ko-i	Kông-sân Kô-yî	R24
Kaohsiung Main	高雄車站	Ko-hiông Chhia-chām	Kô-hiùng Chhâ-chhàm	R11
Lingya Sports Park	苓雅運動園區	Lîng-ngá Ūn-tōng Hn̂g-khu	Lìn-ngá Iun-tung Yèn-khî	O9
Lizihnei	籬仔內	Lî-á-lāi	Lî-è-nui	C1
Love Pier	真愛碼頭	Chin-ài Bé-thâu	Chṳ̂n-oi Ma-thèu	C11
Metropolitan Park	都會公園	To͘-hōe Kong-hn̂g	Tû-fi Kûng-yèn	R21
Nanzih Technology Industrial Park	楠梓科技園區	Lâm-á-khenn Kho-ki Hn̂g-khu	Nâm-chṳ́ Khô-kî Yèn-khî	R19
Oil Refinery Elementary School	油廠國小	Iû-chhiúⁿ Kok-sió	Yù-chhòng Koet-seú	R18
Penglai Pier-2	駁二蓬萊	Pok-jī Hông-lâi	Pok-ngi Phûng-lòi	C13
Sanduo Shopping District	三多商圈	Sam-to	Sâm-tô Sông-khiên	R8
Shihjia	獅甲	Sai-kah	Sṳ̂-kap	R7
Siaogang	小港	Sió-káng	Seú-kóng	R3
Sinyi Elementary School	信義國小	Sìn-gī Kok-sió	Sin-ngi Koet-seú	O6
Software Technology Park	軟體園區	Nńg-thé Hn̂g-khu	Ngiôn-thí Yèn-khî	C7
Weiwuying	衛武營	Ōe-bú-iâⁿ	Ví-vú-yàng	O10
World Games	世運／國家體育園區	Sè-ūn/Kok-ka Thé-io̍k Hn̂g-khu	Sṳ-yun/Koet-kâ Thí-yuk Yèn-khî	R17
Wukuaicuo	五塊厝	Gō͘-tè-chhù	Ńg-khoài-chhṳ̀	O8
Yanchengpu	鹽埕埔	Iâm-tiâⁿ-po͘	Yàm-chhâng-pu	O2
Zuoying/THSR	左營／高鐵	Chó-iâⁿ/Ko-thih	Chó-yàng/Kô-thiet	R16

== New Taipei Metro ==
The New Taipei Metro consists of one line, Danhai light rail, with 14 stations. Stations V01-V11 opened in 2018, and stations V26-V28 opened in 2020.

Name	Chinese	Taiwanese	Hakka	Code
Binhai Shalun	濱海沙崙	Pin-hái Soa-lūn	Pîn-hói Sâ-lûn	V09
Binhai Yishan	濱海義山	Pin-hái Gī-san	Pîn-hói Ngi-sân	V08
Danhai New Town	淡海新市鎮	Tām-hái Sin-chhī-tìn	Thâm-hói Sîn-sṳ-chṳ́n	V10
Danjin Beixin	淡金北新	Tām-kim Pak-sin	Thâm-kîm Pet-sîn	V05
Danjin Denggong	淡金鄧公	Tām-kim Tēng-kong	Thâm-kîm Then-kûng	V03
Ganzhenlin	竿蓁林	Koaⁿ-chin-nâ	Kôn-chṳn-lìm	V02
Hongshulin	紅樹林	Âng-chhiū-nâ	Fùng-su-lìm	V01
Kanding	崁頂	Khàm-téng	Kham-táng	V11
Shalun	沙崙	Soa-lūn	Sâ-lûn	V27
Tamkang University	淡江大學	Tām-kang Tāi-ha̍k	Thâm-kông Thai-ho̍k	V04
Taipei University of Marine Technology	台北海洋大學	Tâi-pak Hái-iûⁿ Tāi-ha̍k	Thòi-pet Hói-yòng Thai-ho̍k	V28
Tamsui District Office	淡水行政中心	Tām-chúi Hêng-chèng Tiong-sim	Thâm-súi Hàng-chṳn Chûng-sîm	V07
Tamsui Fisherman's Wharf	淡水漁人碼頭	Tām-chúi Hî-jîn Bé-thâu	Thâm-súi Ǹg-ngìn Ma-thèu	V26
Xinshi First Road	新市一路	Sin-chhī Chi̍t-lō͘	Sîn-sṳ Yit-lu	V06

== Taichung MRT ==
The Taichung MRT consists of one line, Green line, with 18 stations. The line officially opened on April 25, 2021.

Name	Chinese	Taiwanese	Hakka	Code
Beitun Main Station	北屯總站	Pak-tūn Chóng-chām	Pet-tun Chúng-chhàm	103
Wenxin Chongde	文心崇德	Bûn-sim Chông-tek	Vùn-sîm Chhùng-tet	106
Daqing	大慶	Tāi-khèng	Thai-khin	115
Feng-le Park	豐樂公園	Hong-lo̍k Kong-hn̂g	Fûng-lo̍k Kûng-yèn	114
HSR Taichung Station	高鐵台中站	Ko-thih Tâi-tiong-chām	Kô-thiet Thòi-chûng-chhàm	119
Jiude	九德	Kiú-tek	Kiú-tet	117
Jiushe	舊社	Kū-siā	Khiu-sa	103
Jiuzhangli	九張犁	Káu-tiuⁿ-lê	Kiú-chông-lài	116
Nantun	南屯	Lâm-tūn	Nàm-tun	113
Shui-an Temple	水安宮	Chuí-an-kiong	Súi-ôn-kiûng	111
Sihwei Elementary School	四維國小	Sù-uî Kok-sió	Si-vì Koet-seú	105
Songzhu	松竹	Siông-tek	Chhiùng-chuk	104
Taichung City Hall	市政府	Chhī-chèng-hú	Sṳ-chṳn-fú	110
Wenhua Senior High School	文華高中	Bûn-hoa Ko-tiong	Vùn-fà Kô-chûng	108
Wenxin Forest Park	文心森林公園	Bûn-sim Sim-lîm Kong-hn̂g	Vùn-sîm Sêm-lìm Kûng-yèn	112
Wuri	烏日	O͘-ji̍t	Vû-ngit	118
Wenxin Yinghua	文心櫻花	Bûn-sim Ing-hoe	Vùn-sîm Yîn-fâ	109
Wenxin Zhongqing	文心中清	Bûn-sim Tiong-chheng	Vùn-sîm Chûng-chhîn	107

== Taipei Metro ==
The Taipei Metro System consists of five lines: Wenhu line, Tamsui–Xinyi line, Zhonghe–Xinlu line, Songshan–Xindian line, Bannan line. There are 117 stations in total on these lines.

Name	Chinese	Taiwanese	Hakka	Code
Banqiao	板橋	Pang-kiô	Piông-khiâu	BL07
Beimen	北門	Pak-mn̂g	Pet-mùn	G13
Beitou	北投	Pak-tâu	Pet-thèu	R22
Cailiao	菜寮	Chhài-liâu	Chhoi-liâu	O14
Chiang Kai-Shek Memorial Hall	中正紀念堂	Tiong-chèng Kì-liām-tn̂g	Chûng-chang Ki-ngiam-thòng	R08/G10
Daan	大安	Tāi-an	Thai-ôn	BR09/R05
Daan Park	大安森林公園	Tāi-an Sim-lîm Kong-hn̂g	Thai-ôn Sêm-lìm Kûng-yèn	R06
Dahu Park	大湖公園	Tōa-ô͘ Kong-hn̂g	Thai-fù Kûng-yèn	BR20
Danfeng	丹鳳	Tan-hōng	Tan-fung	O20
Dapinglin	大坪林	Toā-pêⁿ-nâ	Thai-phiâng-lìm	G04
Daqiaotou	大橋頭	Tōa-kiô-thâu	Thai-khiâu-theù	O12
Dazhi	大直	Tāi-ti̍t	Thai-chhṳ̍t	BR14
Dingpu	頂埔	Téng-po͘	Táng-phû	BL01
Dingxi	頂溪	Téng-khe	Táng-hâi	O04
Donghu	東湖	Tang-ô͘	Tûng-fù	BR22
Dongmen	東門	Tang-mn̂g	Tûng-mùn	R07/O06
Far Eastern Hospital	亞東醫院	A-tang Pēⁿ-īⁿ	Â-tûng Yî-yèn	BL05
Fu Jen University	輔大	Hú-tāi	Phú-thai	O19
Fuxinggang	復興崗	Ho̍k-heng-kong	Fu̍k-hîn-kông	R23
Fuzhong	府中	Hú-tiong	Fú-chûng	BL06
Gangqian	港墘	Káng-kîⁿ	Kóng-chhièn	BR17
Gongguan	公館	Kong-koán	Kûng-kón	G07
Guandu	關渡	Kan-tāu	Koân-thu	R25
Guting	古亭	Kó͘-têng	Kú-thìn	O05/G09
Haishan	海山	Hái-san	Hói-sân	BL04
Hongshulin	紅樹林	Âng-chhiū-nâ	Fùng-su-lìm	R27
Houshanpi	後山埤	Āu-soaⁿ-pi	Heu-sân-phî	BL20
Huilong	迴龍	Hôe-liông	Fûi-liùng	O21
Huzhou	葫洲	Ô͘-chiu	Fù-chû	BR21
Jiangzicui	江子翠	Káng-á-chhuì	Kông-chṳ́-chhù	BL09
Jiannan Road	劍南路	Kiàm-lâm-lō͘	Kiam-nàm-lu	BR15
Jiantan	劍潭	Kiàm-thâm	Kiam-thâm	R15
Jingan	景安	Kéng-an	Kín-ôn	O02
Jingmei	景美	Kéng-bí	Kín-mî	G05
Kunyang	昆陽	Khun-iông	Khûn-yòng	BL21
Linguang	麟光	Lîn-kong	Lîn-kông	BR06
Liuzhangli	六張犁	La̍k-tiuⁿ-lê	Liuk-chông-lài	BR07
Longshan Temple	龍山寺	Liông-san-sī	Liùng-sân-sṳ̀	BL10
Luzhou	蘆洲	Lô͘-chiu	Lù-chû	O54
Mingde	明德	Bêng-tek	Mìn-tet	R18
Minquan West Road	民權西路	Bîn-koân-se-lō͘	Mìn-khièn-sî-lu	R13/O11
Muzha	木柵	Ba̍k-sa	Muk-cha	BR02
Nangang	南港	Lâm-káng	Nàm-kóng	BL22
Nangang Software Park	南港軟體園區	Lâm-káng Nńg-thé Hn̂g-khu	Nàm-kóng Ngiôn-thí Yèn-khî	BR23
Nanjing Fuxing	南京復興	Lâm-kiaⁿ Ho̍k-heng	Nàm-kîn Fu̍k-hîn	BR11/G16
Nanjing Sanmin	南京三民	Lâm-kiaⁿ Sam-bîn	Nàm-kîn Sâm-mìn	G18
Nanshijiao	南勢角	Lâm-sì-kak	Nàm-sṳ-kok	O01
National Taiwan University Hospital	台大醫院	Tâi-tāi Pēⁿ-īⁿ	Thòi-thai Yî-yen	R09
Neihu	內湖	Lāi-ô͘	Nui-fù	BR19
Qilian	唭哩岸	Ki-lí-gān	Kî-lí-ngan	R20
Qiyan	奇岩	Kî-giâm	Khì-ngâm	R21
Qizhang	七張	Chhit-tiuⁿ	Chhit-chông	G03
Sanchong	三重	Saⁿ-têng-po͘	Sâm-chhùng	O15
Sanchong Elementary School	三重國小	Sam-tiông Kok-sió	Sâm-chhùng Koet-seú	O50
Sanhe Junior High School	三和國中	Sam-hô Kok-tiong	Sâm-fò Koet-chûng	O51
Sanmin Senior High School	三民高中	Sam-bîn Ko-tiong	Sâm-mìn Kô-chûng	O53
Shandao Temple	善導寺	Siān-tō-sī	San-thô-sṳ̀	BL13
Shilin	士林	Sū-lîm	Sṳ-lìm	R16
Shipai	石牌	Chio̍h-pâi-á	Sa̍k-phài	R19
Shuanglian	雙連	Siang-liân	Sûng-lièn	R12
Songjiang Nanjing	松江南京	Siông-kang Lâm-kiaⁿ	Chhiùng-kông Nàm-kîn	O08/G15
Songshan	松山	Siông-san	Chhiùng-sân	G19
Songshan Airport	松山機場	Siông-san Ki-tiûⁿ	Chhiùng-sân Kî-chhòng	BR13
St. Ignatius High School	徐匯中學	Chhî-hōe Tiong-ha̍k	Chhî-fi Chûng-ho̍k	O52
Sun Yat-Sen Memorial Hall	國父紀念館	Kok-hū Kì-liām-koán	Koet-fu Ki-ngiam-kón	BL17
Taipei 101 / World Trade Center	台北101/世貿	Tâi-pak 101/Sè bō͘	Thòi-pet 101/Sṳ Mo	R03
Taipei Arena	台北小巨蛋	Tâi-pak Sió-kī-tàn	Thòi-pet Seú-ki-thàn	G17
Taipei Bridge	台北橋	Tâi-pak-kiô	Thòi-pet-khiâu	O13
Taipei City Hall	市政府	Chhī-chèng-hú	Sṳ-chṳn-fú	BL18
Taipei Main	台北車站	Tâi-pak Chhia-chām	Thòi-pet Chhâ-chhàm	R10/BL12
Taipei Nangang Exhibition Center	南港展覽館	Lâm-káng Tián-lám-koán	Nàm-kóng Chán-lám-kón	BR24/BL23
Taipei Zoo	動物園	Tōng-bu̍t-hn̂g	Thung-vu̍t-yèn	BR01
Taipower Building	台電大樓	Tâi-tiān Tōa-lâu	Thòi-thien Thai-leù	G08
Tamsui	淡水	Tām-chúi	Thâm-súi	R28
Technology Building	科技大樓	Kho-ki Tōa-lâu	Khô-kî Thai-lèu	BR08
Touqianzhuang	頭前莊	Thâu-chêng-chng	Theù-chhièn-chông	O17
Tucheng	土城	Thô͘-siâⁿ	Thú-sàng	BL03
Wanfang Community	萬芳社區	Bān-hong Siā-khu	Van-fông Sa-khî	BR03
Wanfang Hospital	萬芳醫院	Bān-hong Pēⁿ-īⁿ	Van-fông Phiang-yen	BR04
Wanlong	萬隆	Bān-liông	Van-lùng	G06
Wende	文德	Bûn-tek	Vùn-tet	BR18
Xiangshan	象山	Chhiūⁿ-soaⁿ	Siong-sân	R02
Xianse Temple	先嗇宮	Sian-sek-kiong	Siên-sep-kiûng	O16
Xiaobitan	小碧潭	Sió-phek-thâm	Seú-pit-thàm	G03A
Xiaonanmen	小南門	Sió-lâm-mn̂g	Seú-nàm-mùn	G11
Xihu	西湖	Se-ô͘	Sî-fù	BR16
Ximen	西門	Se-mn̂g	Sî-mùn	G12/BL11
Xinbeitou	新北投	Sin-pak-tâu	Sîn-pet-thèu	R22A
Xindian	新店	Sin-tiàm	Sîn-tiam	G01
Xindian District Office	新店區公所	Sin-tiàm Khu-kong-só͘	Sîn-tiam-khî-kûng-só	G02
Xingtian Temple	行天宮	Hêng-thian-kiong	Hàng-thiên-kiûng	O09
Xinhai	辛亥	Sin-hāi	Sin-hāi	BR05
Xinpu	新埔	Sin-po͘	Sîn-phû	BL08
Xinyi Anhe	信義安和	Sìn-gī An-hô	Sin-ngi Ôn-fò	R04
Xinzhuang	新莊	Sin-chng	Sîn-chông	O18
Yongan Market	永安市場	Éng-an Chhī-tiûⁿ	Yún-ôn Sṳ-chhòng	O03
Yongchun	永春	Éng-chhun	Yún-chhûn	BL19
Yongning	永寧	Éng-lêng	Yún-nèn	BL02
Yuanshan	圓山	Îⁿ-soa-á	Yèn-sân	R14
Zhishan	芝山	Chi-san	Chṳ-sân	R17
Zhongshan	中山	Tiong-san	Chûng-sân	R11/G14
Zhongshan Elementary School	中山國小	Tiong-san Kok-sió	Chûng-sân Koet-seú	O10
Zhongshan Junior High School	中山國中	Tiong-san Kok-tiong	Chûng-sân Koet-tsûng	BR12
Zhongxiao Dunhua	忠孝敦化	Tiong-hàu Tun-hoà	Chûng-hau Tûn-fa	BL16
Zhongxiao Fuxing	忠孝復興	Tiong-hàu Ho̍k-heng	Chûng-hau Fu̍k-hîn	BR10/BL15
Zhongxiao Xinsheng	忠孝新生	Tiong-hàu Sin-seng	Chûng-hau Sîn-sâng	O07/BL14
Zhongyi	忠義	Tiong-gī	Chûng-ngi	R24
Zhuwei	竹圍	Tek-ûi-á	Chuk-vì	R26

== Taoyuan Metro ==
Taoyuan Metro consists of one line, Taoyuan Airport MRT, with 21 stations.

Name	Chinese	Taiwanese	Hakka	Code
Airport Hotel	機場旅館	Ki-tiûⁿ Lí-koán	Kî-chhòng Lî-kón	A14a
Airport Terminal 1	機場第一航廈	Ki-tiûⁿ Tē-it Hái-hā	Kî-chhòng Thi-yit Hòng-hà	A12
Airport Terminal 2	機場第二航廈	Ki-tiûⁿ Tē-jī Hái-hā	Kî-chhòng Thi-ngi Hòng-hà	A13
Chang Gung Memorial Hospital	長庚醫院	Chióng-keng Pēⁿ-īⁿ	Chhòng-kang Yî-yèn	A8
Dayuan	大園	Tōa-hn̂g	Thai-yèn	A15
Hengshan	橫山	Hoâiⁿ-san	Vàng-sân	A16
Huanbei	環北	Khoân-pak	Fàn-pet	A21
Kengkou	坑口	Kheⁿ-kháu	Hâng-khiéu	A11
Linghang	領航	Léng-hái	Liâng-hòng	A17
Linkou	林口	Nâ-kháu	Lìm-khiéu	A9
National Taiwan Sport University	體育大學	Thé-io̍k Tāi-ha̍k	Thí-yuk Thai-ho̍k	A7
New Taipei Industrial Park	新北產業園區	Sin-pak Sán-gia̍p Hn̂g-khu	Sîn-pet Sán-ngia̍p Yèn-khî	A3
Sanchong	三重	Saⁿ-têng-po͘	Sâm-chhùng	A2
Shanbi	山鼻	Soaⁿ-phīⁿ	Sân-phi	A10
Taipei Main	台北車站	Tâi-pak Chhia-chām	Thòi-pet Chhâ-chhàm	A1
Taishan	泰山	Thài-san	Thai-sân	A5
Taishan Guihe	泰山貴和	Thài-san Kùi-hô	Thai-sân Kui-fò	A6
Taoyuan HSR	高鐵桃園站	Ko-thih Thô-hn̂g Chām	Kô-thiet Thò-yèn Chhàm	A18
Taoyuan Sports Park	桃園體育園區	Thô-hn̂g Thé-io̍k Hn̂g-khu	Thò-yèn Thí-yuk Yèn-khî	A19
Xingnan	興南	Hèng-lâm	Hîn-nàm	A20
Xinzhuang Fuduxin	新莊副都心	Sin-chng Hù-to͘-sim	Sîn-chông Fu-tû-sîm	A4

== Alishan Forest Railway ==
The Alishan Forest Railway is owned and operated by Forestry Bureau. Currently four lines are in operation: Main line (Alishan line), Chushan line, Shenmu line, and Zhaoping line.

Name	Chinese	Taiwanese	Hakka
Alishan	阿里山	A-lí-san	Â-lî-sân
Beimen	北門	Pak-mn̂g	Pet-mùn
Chiayi	嘉義	Ka-gī	Kâ-ngi
Chushan	祝山	Chiok-soaⁿ	Chuk-sân
Duigaoyue	對高岳	Tuì-ko-ga̍k	Tui-kô-ngo̍k
Duolin	多林	To-lîm	Tô-lìm
Dulishan	獨立山	To̍k-li̍p-soaⁿ	Thu̍k-li̍p-sân
Erwanping	二萬平	Jī-bān-pêⁿ	Ngi-van-phìn
Fenqihu	奮起湖	Pùn-ki-ô͘	Fun-hí-fù
First Switch	第一分道	Tē-it-pun-tō	Thi-yit-fûn-tho
Jiaoliping	交力坪	Ka-le̍k-pêⁿ	Kâu-li̍t-phiàng
Liyuanliao	梨園寮	Lê-hn̂g-liâu	Lài-yèn-liâu
Lumachan	鹿麻產	Lo̍k-môa-sán	Lu̍k-mà-sán
Mululiao	木履寮	Ba̍k-kia̍h-liâu	Muk-kiak-liàu
Pingzhena	屏遮那	Hè-sen-ná	Phìn-châ-nâ
Shenmu	神木	Sîn-bo̍k	Sṳ̀n-muk
Shizifendao	十字分道	Si̍p-jī-pun-tō	Sṳ̍p-sṳ-fûn-tho
Shizilu	十字路	Si̍p-jī-lō͘	Sṳ̍p-sṳ-lu
Shuisheliao	水社寮	Chúi-siā-liâu	Súi-sa-liàu
Zhangnaoliao	樟腦寮	Chiuⁿ-ló͘-liâu	Chông-nó-liàu
Zhaoping	沼平	Chau-pêng	Cheu-phiàng
Zhuqi	竹崎	Tek-kiā	Chuk-khì

== See also ==
- Rail transport in Taiwan
