= Tai'an Old railway station =

Railway station in Taiwan

Tai'an Old Station 泰安舊站
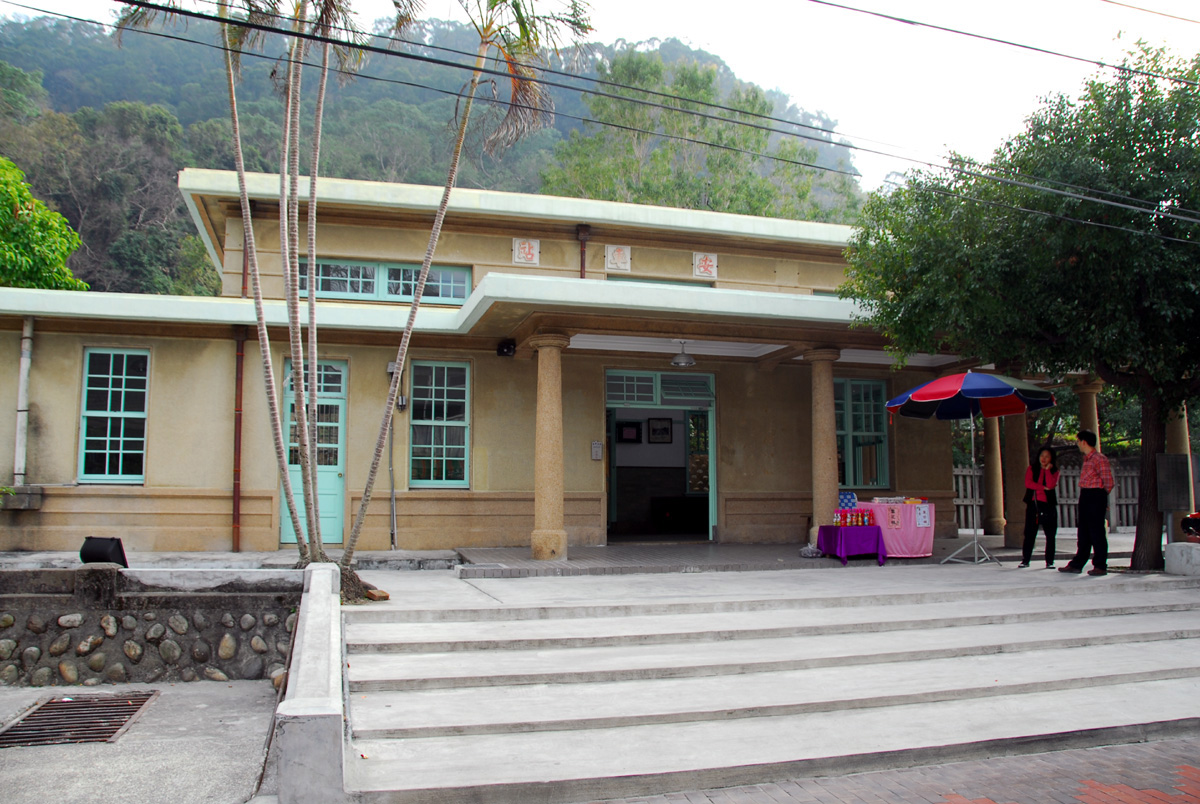
- Station exterior

Chinese name
- Traditional Chinese: 泰安舊站
Transcriptions
Standard Mandarin
- Hanyu Pinyin: Tài'ān Jiùzhàn
- Bopomofo: ㄊㄞˋ ㄢ ㄐㄧㄡˋ ㄓㄢˋ

General information
- Location: Houli District, Taichung; Taiwan
- Coordinates: 24°19′22″N 120°44′56″E
- System: Taiwan Railway railway station
- Line: Former Mountain line
- Distance: 173.2 km to Keelung; 13.6 km to Sanyi
- Platforms: 1 island platform
- Connections: Local bus

Construction
- Structure type: At grade

Other information
- Station code: 142

History
- Opened: 1 December 1910
- Closed: 24 September 1998

Services
Preceding station	Taiwan Railway	Following station
Yutengping towards Sanyi	Former Mountain line	Houli Terminus
Location

Tai'an Old railway station (Chinese: 泰安舊站; pinyin: Tài'ān Jiùzhàn) is a railway station located in Houli District, Taichung, Taiwan. It is operated by Taiwan Railway as part of the Former Mountain Line. As the railway line was replaced by a newer line, this station was replaced by a new station to the west. The old station building was renamed the Tai'an Railway Culture Park and is preserved as a historical monument by the Taichung City Government.

As of 2018, there are no scheduled passenger services at this station.

== History ==
The station was opened on December 1, 1910 as the Da'an River Signal Station, which served as a signal box. A passenger building opened on July 1, 1912 and renamed to Da'an railway station in 1920.

The 1935 Shinchiku-Taichū earthquake destroyed the original wooden station building. In its place, a concrete building was constructed. On March 1, 1954, the station was renamed as Tai'an railway station.

When operation of the Former Mountain Line terminated on September 24, 1998, the station also ceased operation. A new station was built further west to accommodate passengers. Tai'an Old station was preserved as a historical monument and all railroad switches in the station were left untouched. However, the overhead power lines as well as the railroad to Houli station were demolished. The station building remained open as a tourist site.

Between June 5-9, 2010, to promote tourism, the Former Mountain Line resumed service between Tai'an and Sanyi station, using a steam locomotive numbered CK124. The Taiwan Railways Administration also attempted to renovate the line for operation, but the construction bidding attracted no contractors. Since then, the Miaoli County Government has hosted an additional six events using steam locomotives. Other than that, there are no scheduled passenger services at this station.
