= Former Mountain line =

Railway line in Taiwan

Former Mountain Line

Overview
- Native name: 舊山線
- Status: Seasonal operation
- Owner: Taiwan Railway Corporation
- Termini: Sanyi; Houli
- Stations: 4

History
- Opened: September 1903
- Closed: 24 September 1998

Technical
- Line length: 15.9 km (9.9 mi)
- Track gauge: 1,067 mm (3 ft 6 in)

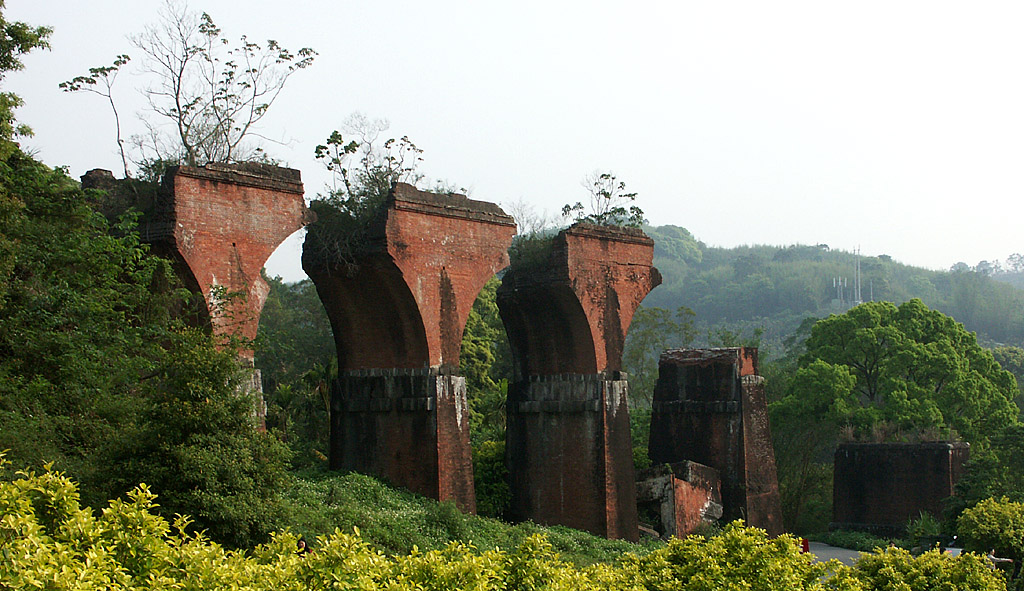
Longteng Bridge

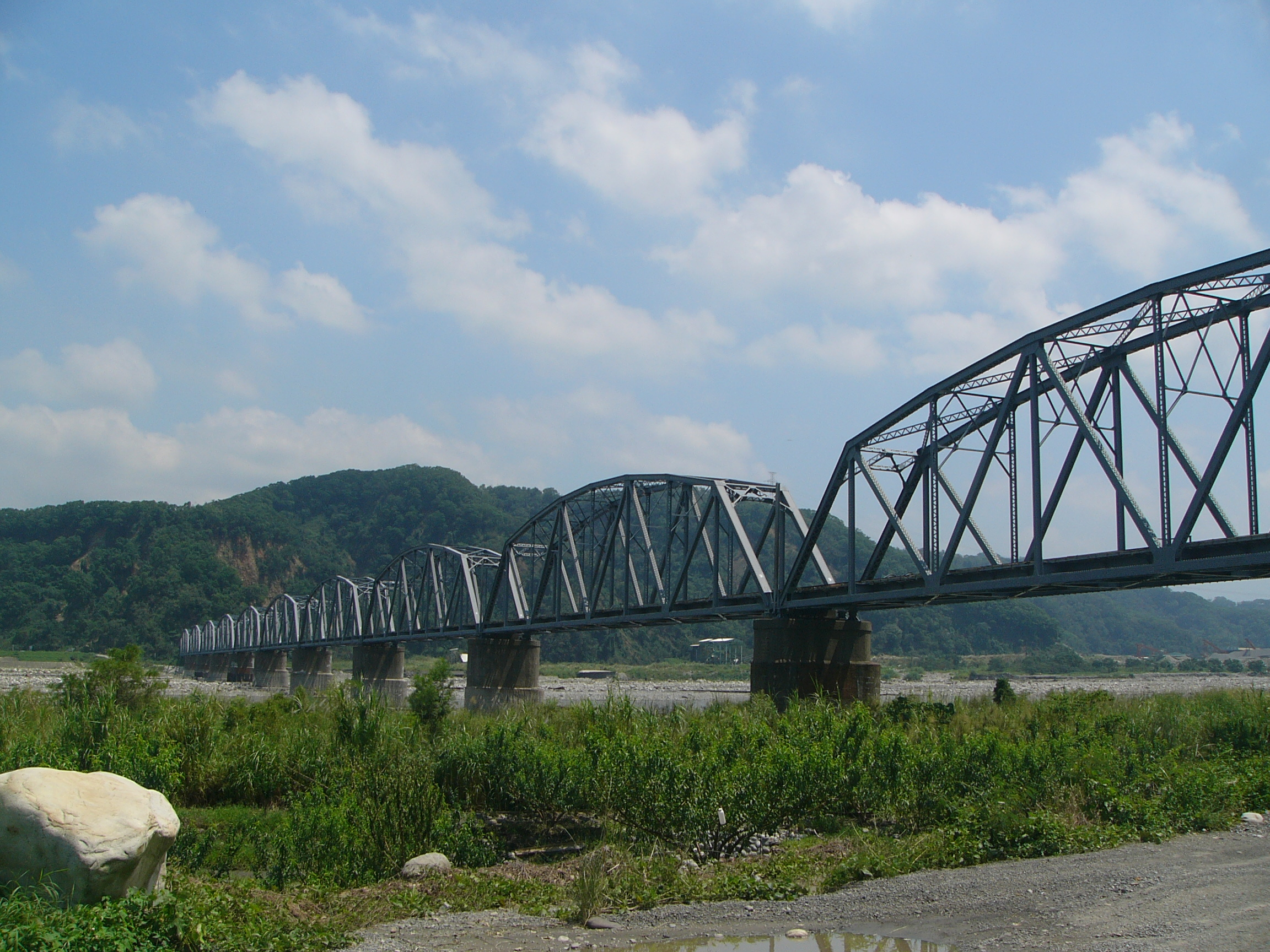
Da'an River Bridge

The Former Mountain line (Chinese: 舊山線; pinyin: Jiù Shānxiàn; Pe̍h-ōe-jī: Kū Soaⁿ-soàⁿ) is a railway branch line in Taiwan operated by the Taiwan Railway. The name literally means "old mountain line" (another name for the Taichung line) and can refer to any section of the Taichung line that ceased operations when it was replaced by a newer rail. However, the term is most widely used to refer to the segment between Sanyi and Houli stations.

The line was completed in 1903 and began operations in 1908. Operations were suspended on September 24, 1998 with the opening of a newer route to the west, and all stations between Sanyi and Houli closed down. Between June 5–9, 2010, to promote tourism, the Former Mountain Line resumed service between Sanyi and Tai'an Old station using a steam locomotive numbered CK124. The Taiwan Railways Administration also attempted to renovate the line for operation, but the construction bidding attracted no contractors. Since then, the Miaoli County Government has hosted an additional six events using steam locomotives. Other than that, the line has no scheduled passenger services.

In 2002 it was listed as a potential World Heritage Site.

== Route ==
The Former Mountain line is 15.9 km long and runs parallel to the Taichung line. It uses a 1,067 mm (3 ft 6 in) gauge.

From Sanyi station, the line branches eastward and climbs to a height of 402.326 meters above sea level at Shengxing station, which is the highest point of any TRA track. From Shengxing, the track snakes through the mountains before passing through the site of the removed Yutengping station, bypassing Longteng Bridge, a destroyed railway bridge. Then it crosses the Da'an River and arrives at Tai'an Old station before merging with the Taichung line again at Houli station.

== Stations ==
| Name | Chinese | Taiwanese | Hakka | Transfers and notes | Location | |
|---|---|---|---|---|---|---|
| Sanyi | 三義 | Sam-gī | Sâm-ngi | → Taichung line | Sanyi | Miaoli; County |
| Shengxing | 勝興 | Sèng-heng | Sṳn-hîn | | Sanyi | Miaoli; County |
| ~~Yutengping~~ | ~~魚藤坪~~ | Hî-tîn-phiâⁿ | Ǹg-thèn-phiâng | Built in 2010 and removed in 2011. Near Longteng Bridge | Sanyi | Miaoli; County |
| Tai'an Old | 泰安舊 | Thài-an (Kū) | Thai-ôn (Khiu) | About 1 km from the current Tai'an Station | Houli | Taichung |
| Houli | 后里 | Āu-lí | Heu-lî | → Taichung line | Houli | Taichung |
