= Taian =

Taian, Tai-an, or Tai'an may refer to:

== Japan ==
- Tai-an (待庵), a chashitsu tea room at Myōki-an temple, Japan, famous for its connection with Sen no Rikyū, designated a National Treasure
- Taian, a day of Rokuyō in the Japanese calendar

== Places ==
- Tai'an, a prefecture-level city in Shandong, China
- Tai'an County, a county in Liaoning, China
- Tai'an Subdistrict (太安街道), a subdistrict in Xi'an District, Liaoyuan, Jilin, China
- Tai'an Village, in Beiwan, Jingyuan, Baiyin, Gansu, China

=== Places in Taiwan ===
- Tai-an, Miaoli, a township in eastern Miaoli County, Taiwan
- Tai'an Station (Taichung), a railway station in Taichung, Taiwan

=== Towns in People's Republic of China ===
- Tai'an, Wanzhou District, Chongqing (太安), in Wanzhou District, Chongqing
- Tai'an, Tongnan District, Chongqing (太安), in Tongnan District, Chongqing
- Tai'an, Jiangsu (泰安), in Yangzhou, Jiangsu
- Tai'an, Shaanxi (太安), in Yijun County, Shaanxi
- Tai'an, Luzhou (泰安), in Luzhou, Sichuan
- Tai'an, Zhongjiang County (太安), in Zhongjiang County, Sichuan

=== Townships in People's Republic of China ===
- Tai'an Township, Jilin (太安乡), in Yushu, Jilin
- Tai'an Township, Sichuan (太安乡), in Neijiang, Sichuan
- Tai'an Township, Yunnan (太安乡), in Yulong Naxi Autonomous County, Yunnan

== Historical eras ==
- Tai'an (302–303), era name used by Emperor Hui of Jin
- Tai'an (385–386), era name used by Fu Pi, emperor of Former Qin, later continued by Lü Guang (emperor of Later Liang) until 389
- Tai'an (455–459), era name used by Emperor Wencheng of Northern Wei
- Tai'an (492–505), era name used by Yujiulü Nagai, khan of Rouran

== See also ==
- Tai'an station (disambiguation)
