= Yutengping =

Yutengping (Chinese: 魚藤坪) may refer to:

- Yutengping Bridge, also known as Longteng Bridge, a destroyed railroad bridge
- Yutengping railway station, a defunct railway station near Longteng Bridge
