= Tai'an station =

Tai'an railway station can refer to:

- Tai'an railway station (Taichung), a station in Houli, Taichung on the TRA Taichung Line
  - Tai'an Old railway station, a defunct station near the new station
- Tai'an station (Shenzhen Metro), a station on the Shenzhen Metro
- Tai'an railway station (Shandong), a station in Tai'an, Shandong on the Beijing–Shanghai high-speed railway
- Tai'an railway station (Liaoning), a station in Tai'an, Liaoning on the Qinhuangdao–Shenyang high-speed railway
