= Yutengping railway station =

Railway station in Miaoli County, Taiwan

Yutengping Station 魚藤坪車站
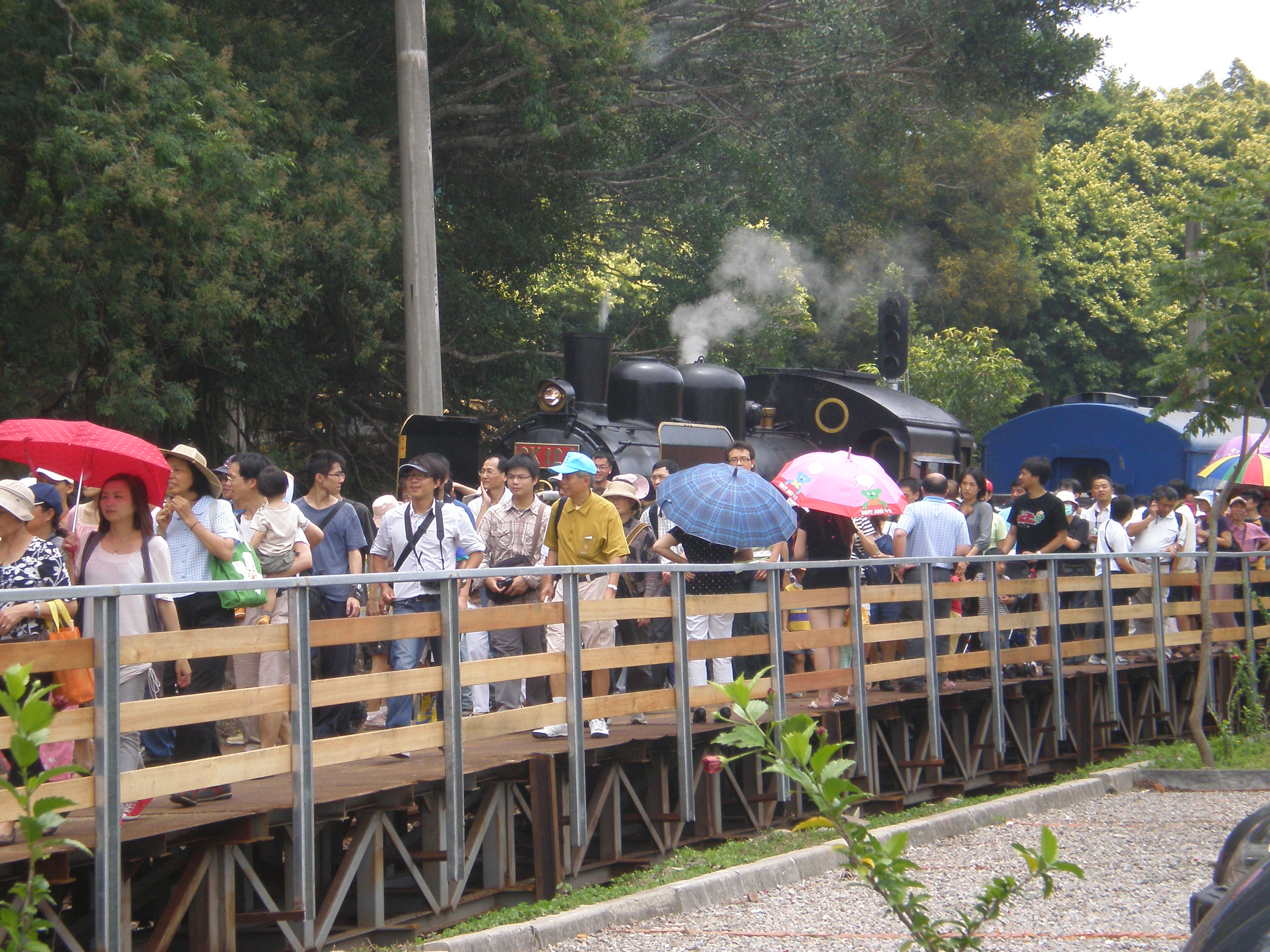
- Station platform in 2010

Chinese name
- Traditional Chinese: 魚藤坪車站
Transcriptions
Standard Mandarin
- Hanyu Pinyin: Yúténgpíng Chēzhàn
- Bopomofo: ㄩˊ ㄊㄥˊ ㄆㄧㄥˊ ㄔㄜ ㄓㄢˋ

General information
- Location: Sanyi, Miaoli; Taiwan
- Coordinates: 24°21′36.2″N 120°46′27.1″E
- System: Taiwan Railway railway station
- Line: Former Mountain line
- Distance: 167.9 km to Keelung; 8.3 km to Sanyi
- Platforms: 1 side platform

Construction
- Structure type: At grade

Other information
- Status: Defunct
- Station code: (none)

History
- Opened: 5 June 2010
- Closed: 2011

Services
Preceding station	Taiwan Railway	Following station
Shengxing towards Sanyi	Former Mountain line	Tai'an Old towards Houli
Location

Yutengping railway station (Chinese: 魚藤坪車站; pinyin: Yúténgpíng Chēzhàn) is a defunct railway station located in Sanyi Township, Miaoli County, Taiwan. It was located on the Former Mountain line and was operated by Taiwan Railways Administration.

Between June 5–9, 2010, to promote tourism, the Former Mountain Line resumed service between Tai'an and Sanyi station after a twelve-year hiatus, using a steam locomotive numbered CK124. A station was chosen to be built here due to its proximity to the Longteng Bridge. However, due to the slope of the station being too steep, the station was removed in 2011.
