= West Lake Resortopia =

Theme park in Sanyi, Miaoli County, Taiwan

West Lake Resortopia 西湖渡假村
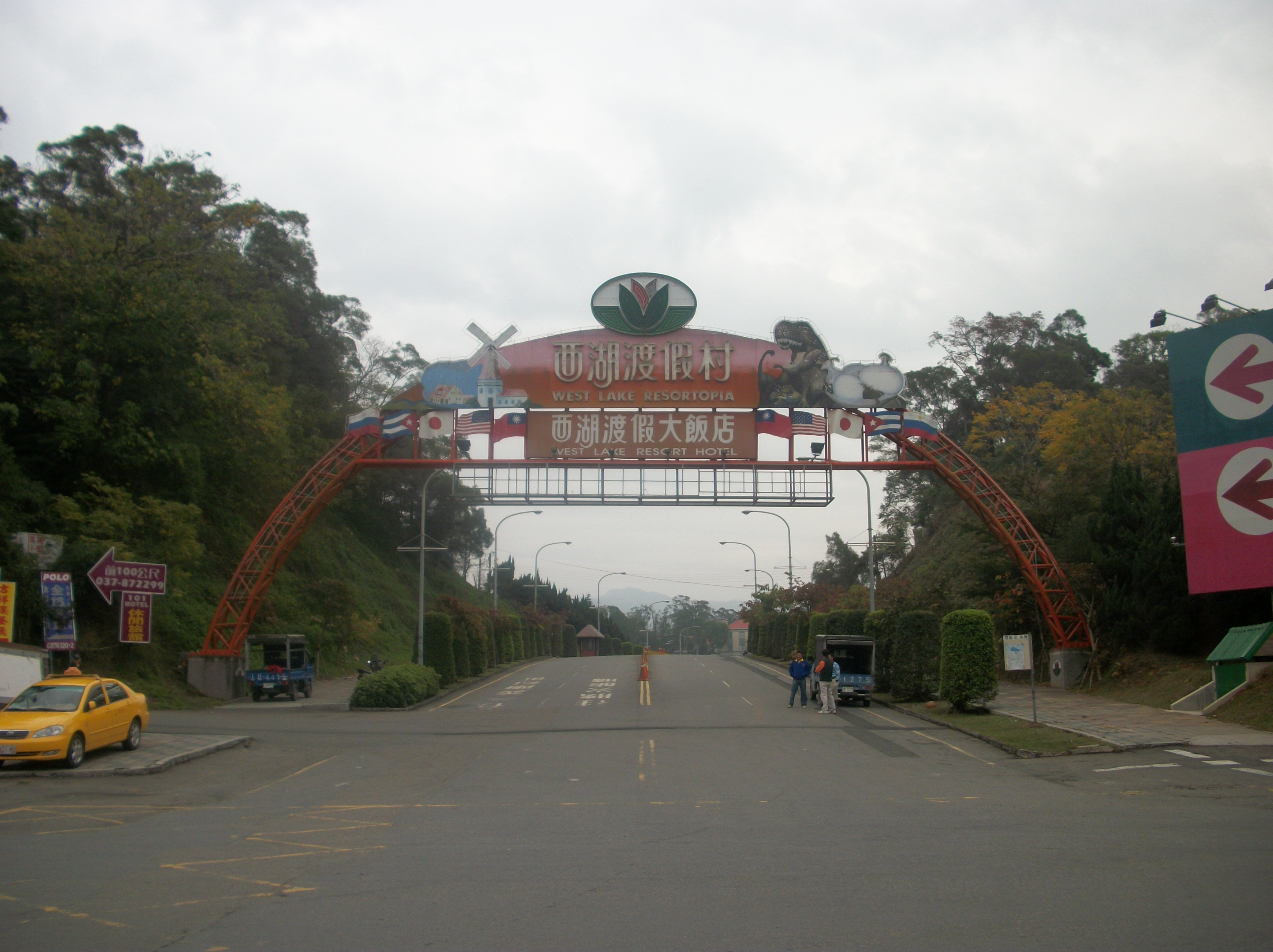
- Interactive map of West Lake Resortopia 西湖渡假村
- Location: Sanyi, Miaoli County, Taiwan
- Coordinates: 24°23′26.8″N 120°45′33.5″E
- Status: Operating
- Opened: 1989
- Theme: Europe
- Area: 60 ha (150 acres)
- Website: Official website (in Chinese)

The West Lake Resortopia (Chinese: 西湖渡假村; Tongyong Pinyin: Sīhú Dùjiàcūn) is a theme park in Sanyi Township, Miaoli County, Taiwan.

== History ==
The theme park was established in 1989. Later on it was renovated to have a theme of Hans Christian Andersen.

== Architecture ==
The theme park spans over an area of 60 hectares and was constructed with a European style of architecture. It is divided into two main areas, which are the amusement park and the cartoon world.

== Notable events ==
- 2010 Miaoli Triathlon

== Transportation ==
The theme park is accessible by taxi south of Sanyi Station of Taiwan Railway.

== See also ==
- List of tourist attractions in Taiwan
