= Chang Lien-cheng Saxophone Museum =

Museum in Houli, Taichung, Taiwan

- 張連昌薩克斯風博物館
- Established: 27 January 2011
- Location: Houli, Taichung, Taiwan
- Coordinates: 24°18′45″N 120°41′40″E
- Type: museum
- Management: Lien Cheng Saxophone Co.
- Website: Official website

The Chang Lien-cheng Saxophone Museum (traditional Chinese: 張連昌薩克斯風博物館; simplified Chinese: 张连昌萨克斯風博物馆; pinyin: Zhāng Liánchāng Sàkèsīfēng Bówùguǎn) is a saxophone museum and manufacturing company in Houli District, Taichung, Taiwan.

== History ==
The museum is named after Chang Lien-cheng, a local resident who made the first saxophone in Taiwan on his own. His effort initiated the development of saxophone industries in Taiwan ever since, which is now one of the largest centers of saxophone production in the world. The Chang Lien-cheng Saxophone Museum was then opened on 27 January 2011 by Chang's grandchildren.

== Architecture ==
The museum was built as a memorial hall previously dedicated to Chang. It is a two-story building with a concert hall and a tourist-friendly factory that allows visitors to see how the instruments are made.

== Transportation ==
The museum is accessible west from Houli Station of Taiwan Railway.

== See also ==
- List of museums in Taiwan
- List of music museums
