= Taichung line =

Railway line in Taiwan

Taichung line (mountain line)

Overview
- Native name: 臺中線 (山線)
- Owner: Taiwan Railway Corporation
- Termini: Zhunan; Changhua, Zhuifen (branch)
- Stations: 17 (16 on main, 1 on branch)

Service
- Type: Heavy rail
- Operator(s): Taiwan Railway Corporation

History
- Opened: 20 February 1908

Technical
- Line length: 85.5 km (53.1 mi)
- Number of tracks: 2
- Track gauge: 3 ft 6 in (1,067 mm)
- Electrification: 25 kV/60 Hz catenary
- Operating speed: 150 km/h (93 mph)

The Taichung line (Chinese: 臺中線 or 台中線; pinyin: Táizhōng Xiàn; Pe̍h-ōe-jī: Tâi-tiong Soàⁿ), also known as the Mountain line (Chinese: 山線; pinyin: Shān Xiàn; Pe̍h-ōe-jī: Soaⁿ-sòaⁿ), is a line of the Taiwan Railway. It is one of two parallel lines in Central Taiwan, passing the inland area and Downtown Taichung. It has a total length of 85.5 km (53.1 mi), all of which is double track.

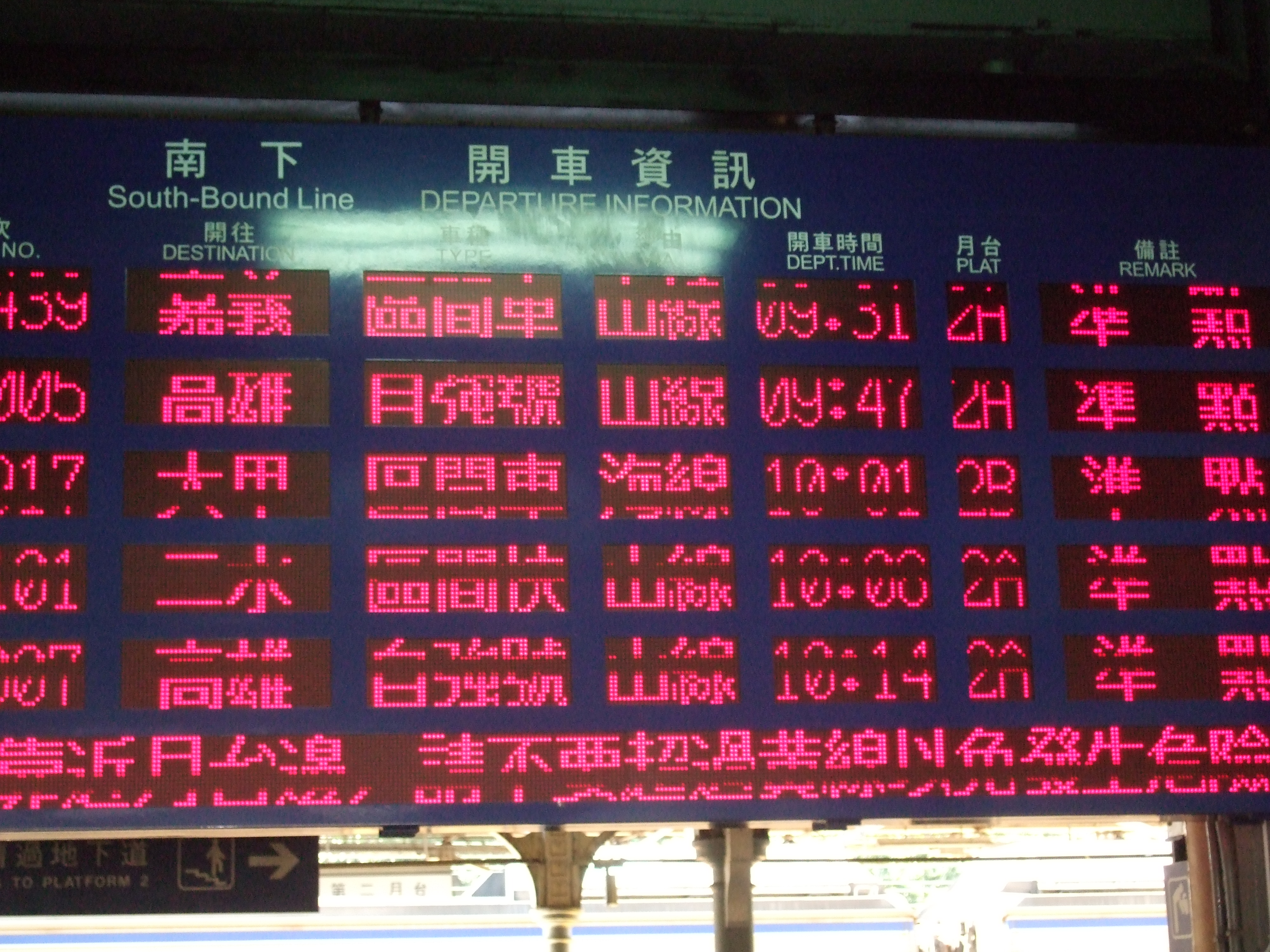
Departures board at the Taichung Train station on the Taichung (Mountain) Line of the Taiwan Railway Administration

== History ==
The Taichung line was first completed in 1908. After the Coast line between Zhunan and Changhua was finished in 1922, the original line was renamed the Taichung line. In 1998, the construction to expand to two tracks (double tracks) was completed. Long tunnels were built to reduce the grade of the line. Sanyi Tunnel is one of the longest railway tunnels in Taiwan. The opening of the new segment of the line relegated the previous segment of the line to become the Former Mountain line.

The section between Fengyuan and Daqing was rebuilt as an elevated line in 2016. Five new stations were added in 2018: Lilin, Toujiacuo, Songzhu, Jingwu, and Wuquan.

== Stations ==
Station name				Transfers	Location	
English	Chinese	Taiwanese	Hakka	Transfers	Location	
Zhunan	竹南	Tek-lâm	Chuk-nàm	→ West Coast line	Zhunan	Miaoli; County
Zaoqiao	造橋	Chō-kiô	Chho-khiâu		Zaoqiao	Miaoli; County
Fengfu	豐富	Hong-hù	Fûng-fu	Miaoli	Houlong	Miaoli; County
Miaoli	苗栗	Biâu-le̍k	Mèu-li̍t		Miaoli	Miaoli; County
Nanshi	南勢	Lâm-sì	Nàm-sṳ		Miaoli	Miaoli; County
Tongluo	銅鑼	Tâng-lô	Thùng-lò		Tongluo	Miaoli; County
Sanyi	三義	Sam-gī	Sâm-ngi	→ Former Mountain line (limited services)	Sanyi	Miaoli; County
Tai'an	泰安	Thài-an	Thai-ôn		Houli	Taichung
Houli	后里	Āu-lí	Heu-lî	→ Former Mountain line (limited services)	Houli	Taichung
Fengyuan	豐原	Hong-goân	Fûng-ngièn		Fengyuan	Taichung
Lilin	栗林	Lek-lîm	Li̍t-lìm		Tanzi	Taichung
Tanzi	潭子	Thâm-chú	Thâm-chṳ́		Tanzi	Taichung
Toujiacuo	頭家厝	Thâu-ke-chhù	Thèu-kâ-chhṳ̀		Tanzi	Taichung
Songzhu	松竹	Siông-tek	Chhiùng-chuk	104 Songzhu	Beitun	Taichung
Taiyuan	太原	Thài-goân	Thai-ngièn		Beitun	Taichung
Jingwu	精武	Cheng-bú	Chîn-vú		East	Taichung
Taichung	臺中	Tâi-tiong	Thòi-chûng		Central	Taichung
Wuquan	五權	Ngō͘-khoân	Ńg-khièn		South	Taichung
Daqing	大慶	Tāi-khèng	Thai-khin	115 Daqing	South	Taichung
Wuri	烏日	O͘-ji̍t	Vû-ngit	118 Wuri (out-of-station)	Wuri	Taichung
Xinwuri	新烏日	Sin O͘-ji̍t	Sîn Vû-ngit	Taichung; 119 HSR Taichung station	Wuri	Taichung
Chenggong	成功	Sêng-kong	Sṳ̀n-kûng	→ Chengzhui line	Wuri	Taichung
Jinma	金馬	Kim-má	Kîm-mâ	124 Jinma (planned)	Changhua	Changhua; County
Changhua	彰化	Chiong-hoà	Chông-fa	→ West Coast line	Changhua	Changhua; County

Notes:

- Tai'an station: Earliest elevated station of TRA
