= 1935 Shinchiku-Taichū earthquake =

Earthquake in Taiwan

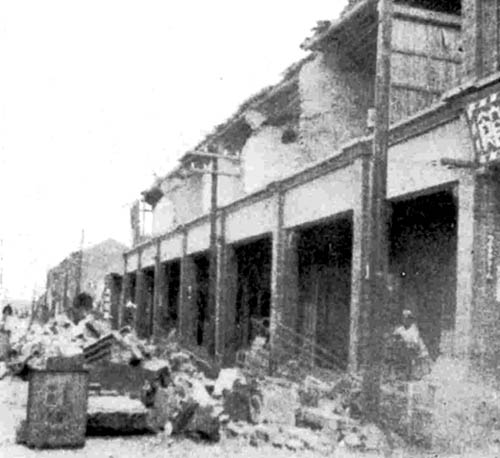

- Location within Taiwan
- UTC time: 1935-04-20 22:02:01
- ISC event: 904224
- USGS-ANSS: ComCat
- Local date: 21 April 1935
- Local time: 06:02:01
- Magnitude: 7.1 M_{w}
- Depth: 15 km (9 mi)
- Epicenter: 24.294°N 120.675°E; Sansa Village, Byōritsu District, Shinchiku Prefecture, Taiwan
- Areas affected: Japanese Taiwan
- Max. intensity: MMI VIII (Severe)
- Casualties: 3,276 killed, 12,053+ injured

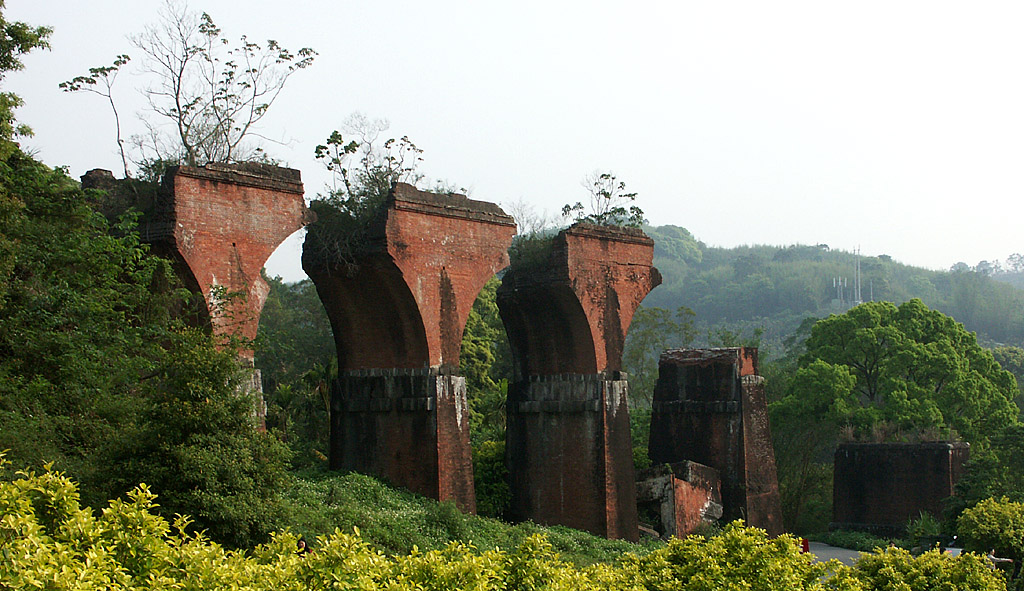
The Longteng Bridge in Sanyi, Miaoli County collapsed during the Shinchiku-Taichū earthquake.

The 1935 Shinchiku-Taichū earthquake occurred with a Richter magnitude of 7.1 (7.1 M_{w}) in April 1935 with its epicenter in Miaoli, Taiwan (then part of Shinchiku Prefecture). It was the deadliest earthquake in Taiwan's recorded history, claiming 3,276 lives and causing extensive damage. Twelve seconds after the mainshock, an aftershock of M_{L} 6.0 occurred, centered on Gabi Village (present-day Emei Township, Hsinchu County).

== Earthquake ==
The initial shock happened at 06:02 local time on 21 April 1935. The epicentre was in the village of Sansa (三叉), Byōritsu District, Shinchiku Prefecture (modern-day Sanyi, Miaoli), with the quake measuring 7.1 on the Richter magnitude scale. The quake was felt all over Taiwan apart from Hengchun on the southern tip of the island, as well as in Fuzhou and Xiamen, China, across the Taiwan Strait. Soil liquefaction was observed in various locations, and a 3 m (10 ft) drop between the two sides of the fault was in evidence at Gabi Village. The most serious damage from the quake was located in Shinchiku Prefecture and Taichū Prefecture (present-day Miaoli County and Taichung) over a 135 square kilometres (52 sq mi) area.

A number of aftershocks followed the main quake, with the largest registering 6.0 with an epicentre at Gabi.

== Damage ==
The earthquake was the deadliest in Taiwan's recorded history. The official reports cite the following figures for deaths, injuries and damage:

- Deaths: 3,276
- Injuries: 12,053
- Houses destroyed: 17,907
- Houses damaged: 36,781

The infrastructure of the island also sustained severe damage, with transportation, communications, and water networks heavily compromised.

== Reported portents ==
Residents in central Taiwan reported that several days before the earthquake there were "signs in the sky" of impending disaster, while locals from Kiyomizu Town, Taichū Prefecture (modern-day Qingshui, Taichung) near the epicentre, reported water boiling in ground wells an hour before the shock.

== Response ==
The great number of casualties in the earthquake prompted a review of safety standards, with the colonial Japanese government implementing building codes of a similar standard to those in force in Japan in the wake of the disaster. Locals were apparently appreciative of the efforts of Japanese policemen in recovering bodies, given local superstitions against touching the dead.

Following the earthquake, Yang Kui penned "Investigation and relief work in Taiwan’s earthquake disaster zones," considered an early work of literary journalism in Taiwan. Liamkua author Lin Ta-piao wrote the "Great Central Taiwan Earthquake New Song" about the earthquake.

== See also ==
- List of earthquakes in 1935
- List of earthquakes in Taiwan
