= Sheng Hsing railway station =

Railway station in Miaoli County, Taiwan

Sheng Hsing 勝興車站
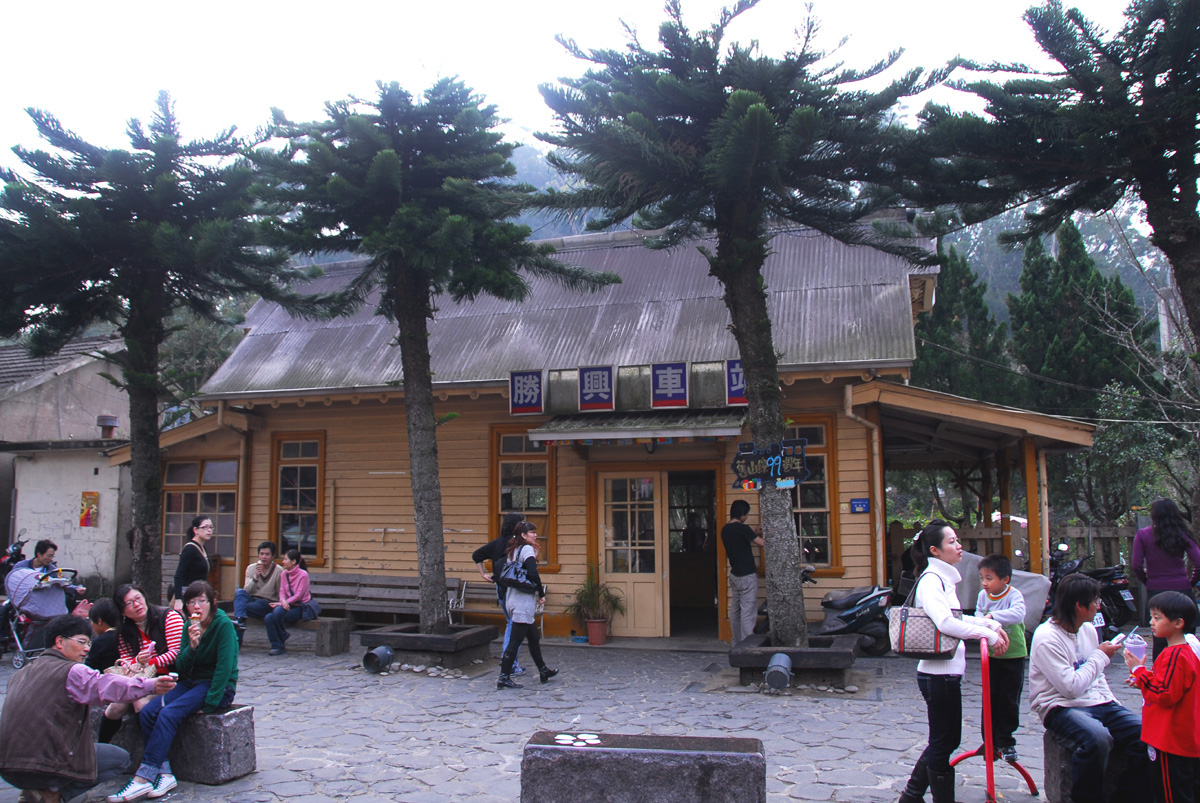

General information
- Location: Sanyi, Miaoli County, Taiwan
- Coordinates: 24°23′17.60″N 120°46′55.34″E
- System: Taiwan Railway railway station
- Owner: Taiwan Railway Corporation
- Operator: Taiwan Railway Corporation
- Line: Former Mountain
- Train operators: Taiwan Railway Corporation

History
- Opened: 1 April 1907
Location

Sheng Hsing (Chinese: 勝興; pinyin: Shèngxīng), also spelled Shengsing, Shengxing or Shengzing, is a railway station on the Taiwan Railway West Coast line (Former Mountain line). It is located in Sanyi Township, Miaoli County, Taiwan. It is now a tourist spot surrounded by a cluster of tea shops and traditional Hakka restaurants.

== History ==
The station was completed in 1905 and functioned as a station on the Mountain line section of the TRA's West Coast line for nearly the rest of the century. At the time of opening, the line was the highest stretch of the main north-south line. The station itself is located at an altitude of 402 meters above sea level.

However, due to the steepness of the West Coast line in the vicinity of the station, the TRA constructed a new, more easily navigable section of the Mountain line. As a result, passenger services to Shengxing Station ceased in 1998 when the new section of the Mountain line opened while the previous segment of the Mountain line containing Shengxing station became known as the Former Mountain line. However, due to its history and value to local people, the TRA kept the station as a tourist attraction, and in 1999 the Miaoli County Government designated the station as a historic site.

In 2010 as part of an initiative to increase tourism in the region, the TRA began steam train services on the Old Mountain line on special occasions. Shengxing Station once again became a stop on passenger train services.

== See also ==
- List of railway stations in Taiwan
- Qishan Train Station
