= Longteng Bridge =

Bridge in Sanyi, Miaoli County, Taiwan

Longteng Bridge 龍騰斷橋
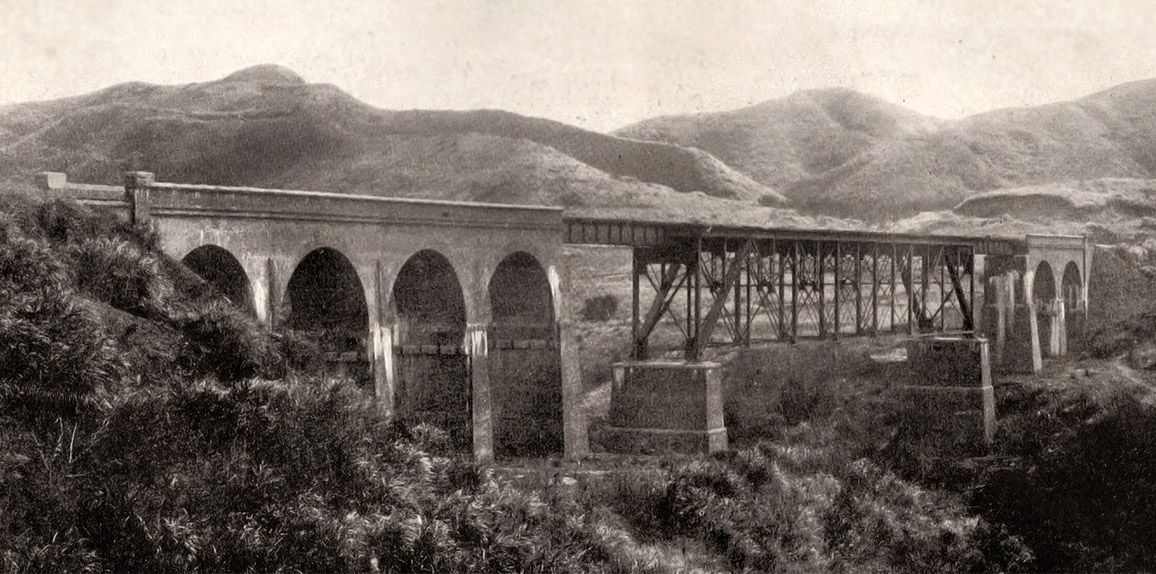
- Longteng Bridge c. 1910
- Coordinates: 24°21′30.4″N 120°46′25.8″E
- Carried: Railroad
- Crossed: (三叉河; Sānchā hé)
- Locale: Longteng Village, Sanyi, Miaoli County, Taiwan
- Official name: 魚藤坪斷橋
- Owner: Taiwan Railway Administration

Characteristics
- Design: masonry arch (approach) and truss (span)
- Material: Brick (arch) and steel (truss)
- No. of spans: 9

History
- Designer: 稻垣兵太郎
- Engineering design by: Theodore Cooper; C.C. Schneider
- Construction start: 1 May 1906
- Construction end: 30 January 1907
- Collapsed: 21 April 1935 (during 1935 Shinchiku-Taichū earthquake)

Location
- Interactive map of Longteng Bridge

The Longteng Bridge (traditional Chinese: 龍騰斷橋; simplified Chinese: 龙腾断桥; pinyin: Lóngténg Duànqiáo; Wade–Giles: Lung^{2}-T'êng^{2} Tuan^{4}-Ch'iao^{2}), officially known as the Yutengping Bridge (魚藤坪斷橋; Yúténg-píng Duànqiáo), is a former bridge in Longteng Village, Sanyi Township, Miaoli County, Taiwan.

== History ==
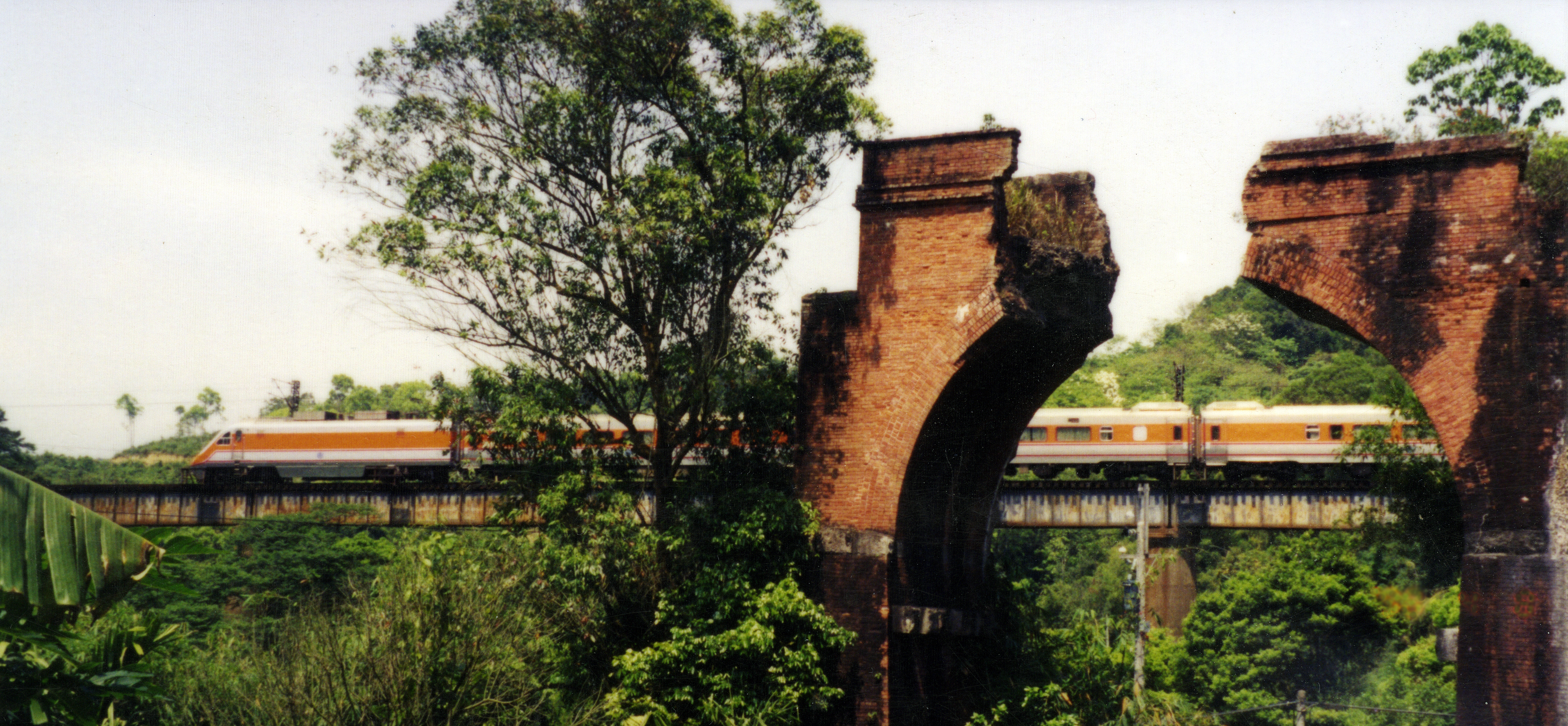
Longteng Bridge pier remains in 1998, with replacement 1938 iron bridge behind

The bridge was built in 1906 during Japanese rule, and was named Gyotōhei kyō (魚藤坪橋). It was designed by the American civil engineers Theodore Cooper and C.C. Schneider for the colonial government. Both the bridge and nearby village (modern-day Longteng) were named Gyotōhei (魚藤坪) after a local plant Millettia pachycarpa (Chinese: 魚藤; pinyin: yúténg; Japanese pronunciation: gyotō) believed to be poisonous to fish; legends believed that a malevolent carp in a nearby lake was responsible for misfortune, and residents planted the shrub to counter the carp. The original design consists of a central steel truss flanked by multiple brick masonry arch approaches.

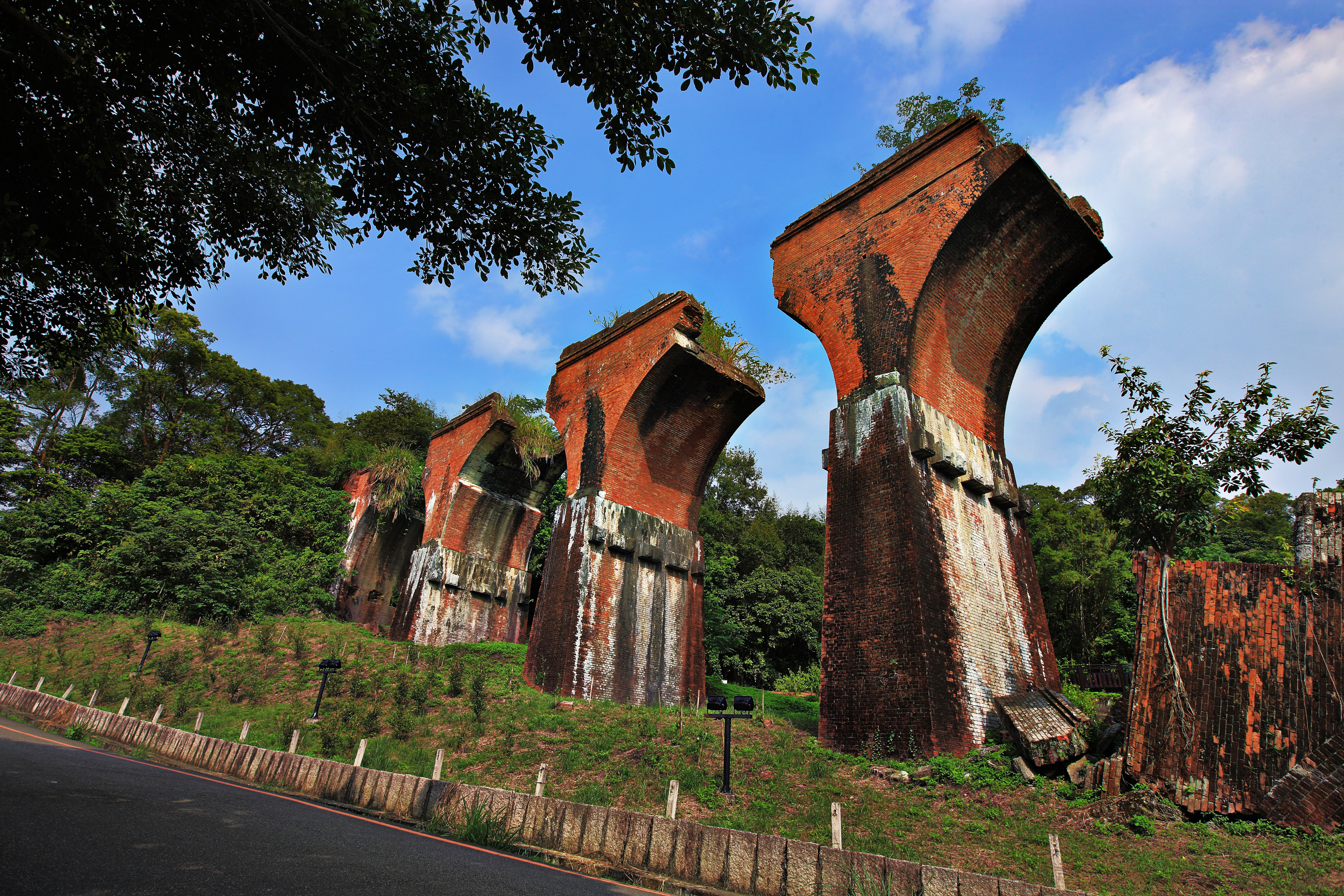
Longteng Bridge pier remains

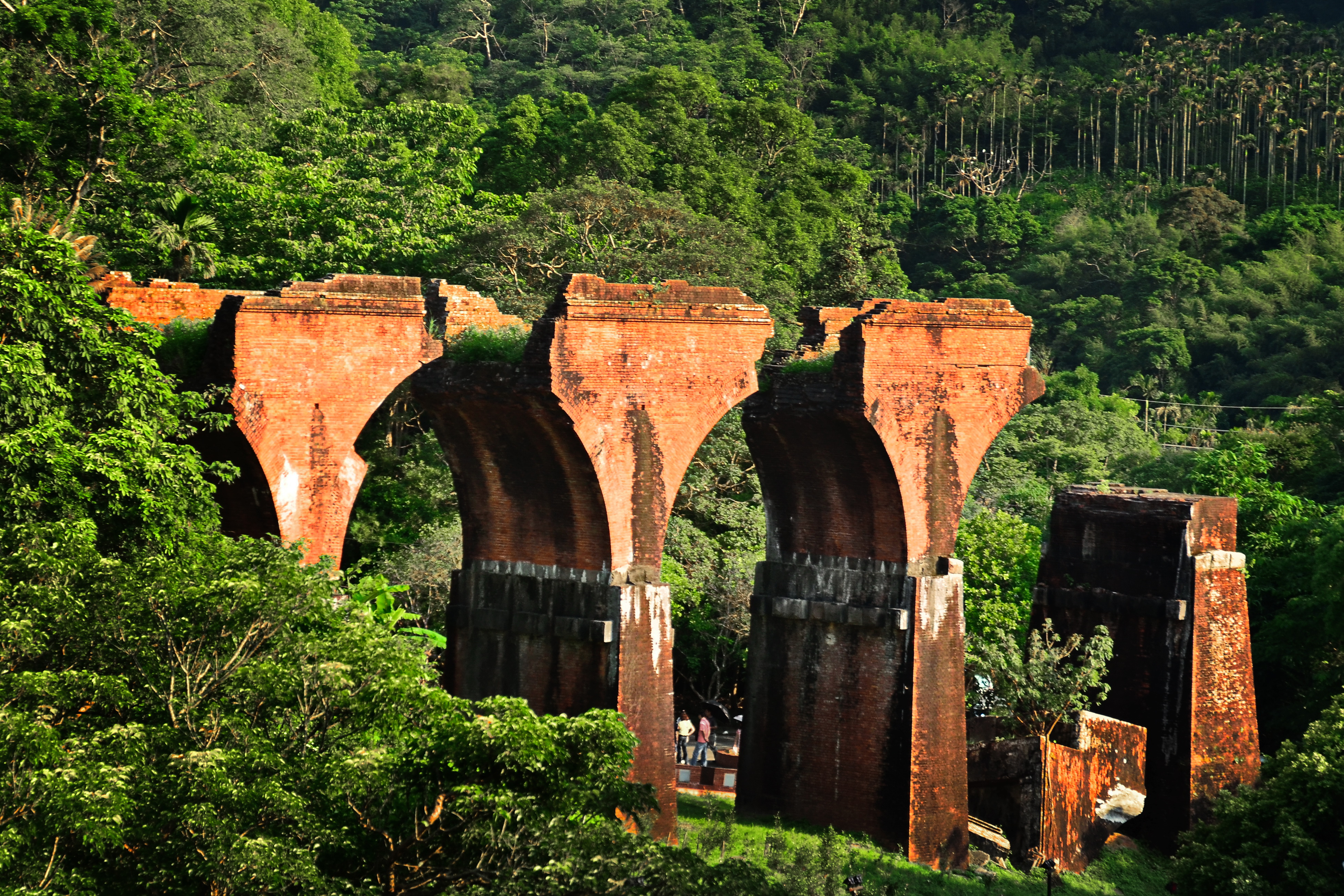
Longteng Bridge pier remains

The April 1935 Shinchiku-Taichū earthquake and subsequent aftershocks in July damaged the bridge beyond repair. Several masonry arches were cracked and the north and south ends of the truss became misaligned. A new iron bridge was built in 1938, 80 meters to the west of Longteng Bridge, and the central truss was dismantled once the new bridge opened. Longteng of the bridge's common name is from the name of Longteng Village and gained use after the Japanese handover of Taiwan.

The 1999 921 earthquake caused one of the remaining piers to collapse and as a result, the county government decided to rededicate the bridge's remains as a monument to the two deadliest earthquakes in Taiwan's history. It was placed on the list of Taiwan's Cultural Heritage Assets (Historical Site #KA09602001112) on 25 November 2003.

== Architecture ==
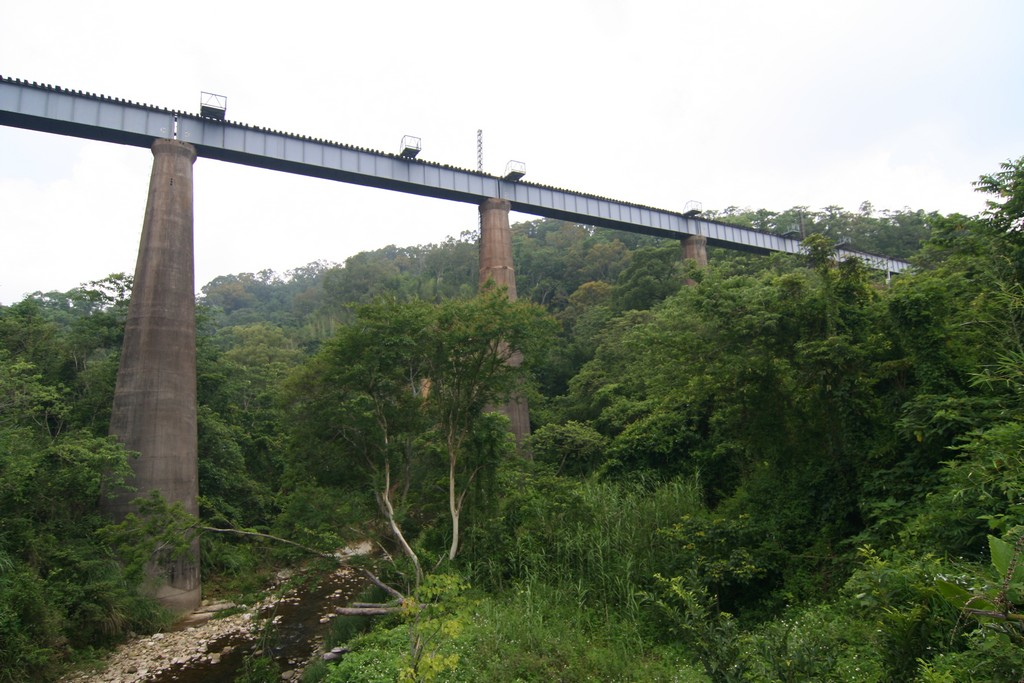
1938 Longteng Bridge

The 1938 bridge stands at 50 meters tall and 200 meters long, making it the highest iron bridge in Taiwan.

The ruined 1907 bridge piers are covered with white tung tree flowers (桐花; tóng huā) every year from April to May, marking the height of its popularity as a tourist and hiking destination.

== Transportation ==
The bridge is accessible by taxi south from Sanyi Station of Taiwan Railway.

Between 2010 and 2011, the station was accessible by Yutengping Station, which has since been removed.

== See also ==
- List of bridges in Taiwan
- Transportation in Taiwan
