= Tai'an railway station (Taiwan) =

Railway station located in Taichung, Taiwan

Coordinates: 24°19′52.5″N 120°44′30.7″E

Tai'an 泰安
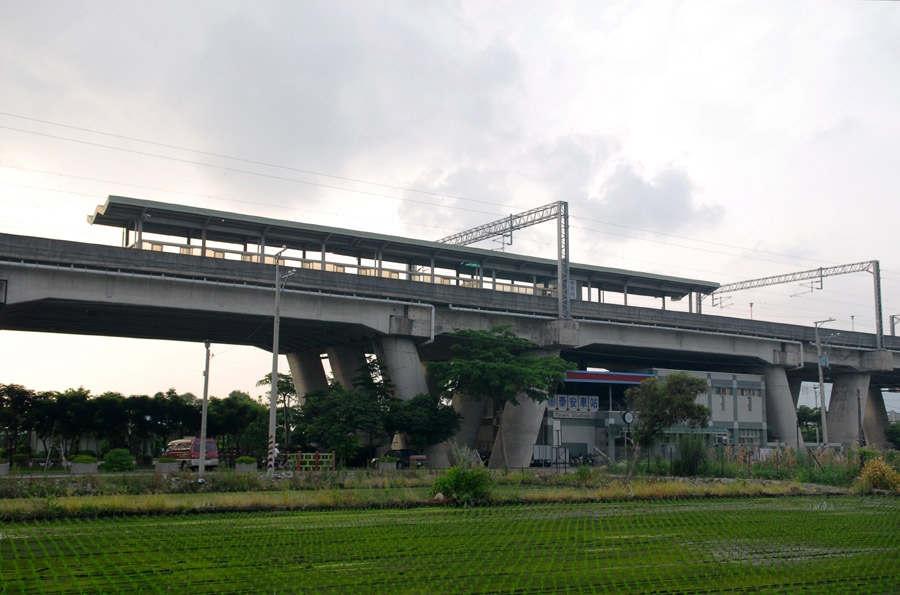
- Tai'an (New) station

General information
- Location: Anmei Rd, No. 37; Houli, Taichung; Taiwan
- Operated by: Taiwan Railway
- Line: Western Trunk line (142)
- Distance: 169.7 km from Keelung
- Platforms: Single island platform

Construction
- Structure type: Elevated

Other information
- Classification: 簡易站 (TRA level)

History
- Opened: 24 September 1998

Services
Preceding station	Taiwan Railway	Following station
Sanyi towards Keelung	Western Trunk line	Houli towards Kaohsiung
Location

Tai'an (Chinese: 泰安車站; pinyin: Tài'ān Chēzhàn) is a railway station on Taiwan Railway Taichung line located in Houli District, Taichung, Taiwan. The current elevated station is not the first Tai'an Station nor is located at its original site. Due to the re-routing of the West Coast line, the TRA closed the Tai'an Old Station on the Former Mountain line and keeps it as a tourist and historical facility while transferring the actual transportation service to the new station.

== Structure ==
Tai'an station is an elevated train station. The ticket vending machine is placed on the ground floor, and passengers go upstairs to the fifth floor to take the train. There is an elevator for use by those who are physically disabled. An island platform is located between the tracks.

== Platform layout ==
Platform
Platform	East■ Mountain line	Southward
Platform	Island Platform, door open right of driving direction.
Platform	West■ Mountain line	Northward

== Service ==
As a minor station, Tai'an station is primarily serviced by local trains (區間車). A few times per day a Chu-Kuang Express (莒光號) or a Tzu-Chiang Limited Express (自強號) stops at the station.

== Around the station ==
- Liyutan Dam

== See also ==
- List of railway stations in Taiwan
