= Sanyi, Miaoli =

Rural township in Miaoli County, Taiwan

Coordinates: 24°25′N 120°46′E

Sanyi Township 三義鄉
- Rural township
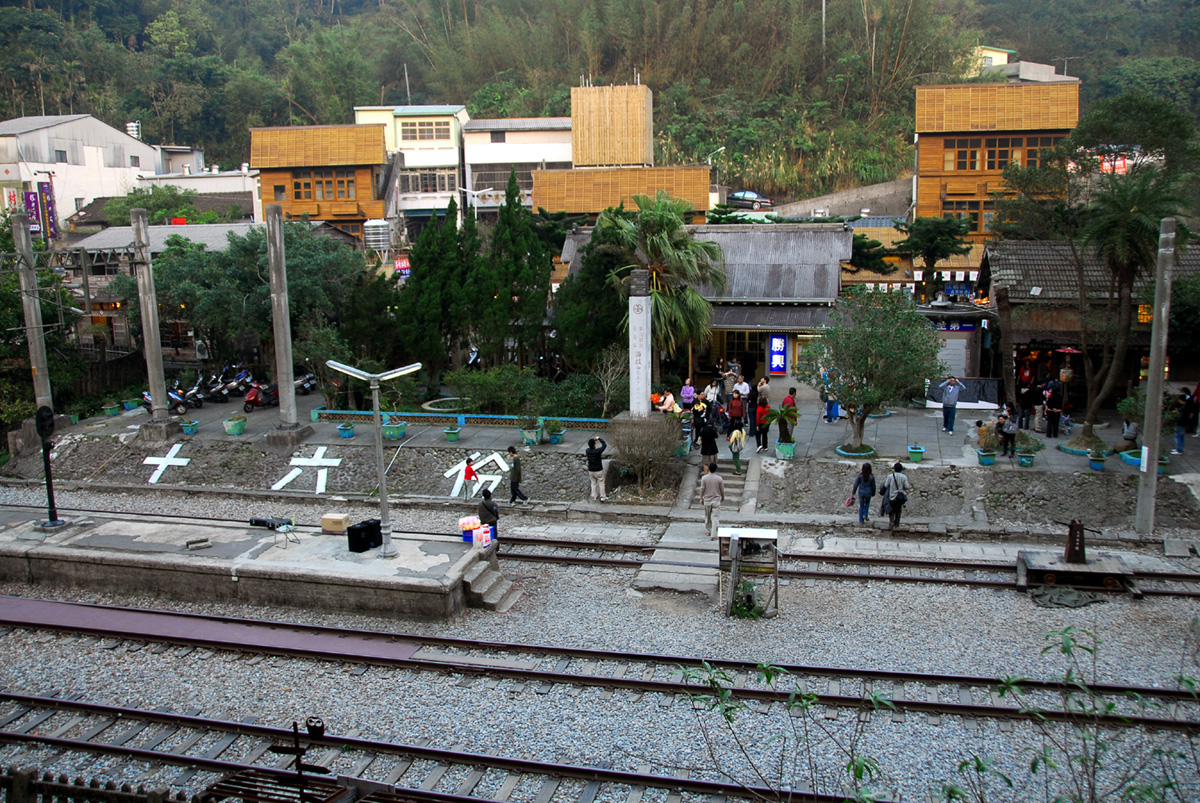

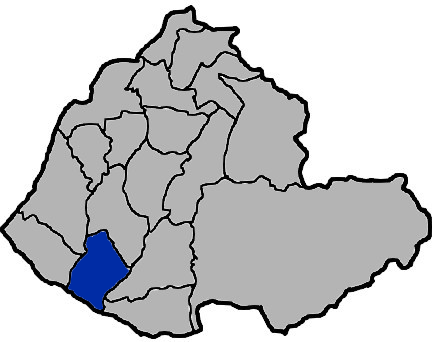
- Location: Miaoli County, Taiwan

Area
  - Total: 69 km^{2} (27 sq mi)

Population (September 2023)
  - Total: 14,995
  - Density: 220/km^{2} (560/sq mi)
- Website: www.sanyi.gov.tw (in Chinese)

Sanyi Township (Chinese: 三義鄉; pinyin: Sānyì Xiāng) is a rural township in southern Miaoli County, Taiwan. It is famous for its mudiao (woodcarving) industry, earning it the name the Woodcarving Kingdom of Taiwan.

== Geography ==
Sanyi is located in the mountains of northwestern Taiwan. On its northeastern boundary is Sanjiao Mountain at 567 meters, and to the east lies Huoyan Mountain at 602 meters. As of September 2023, its population was estimated to be 14,995.

== Administrative divisions ==
The township comprises seven villages: Guangcheng, Liyutan, Longteng, Shengxing, Shuanghu, Shuangtan and Xihu.

== Politics ==
The township is part of Miaoli County Constituency I electoral district for Legislative Yuan.

== Economy ==
Initially, the Sanyi area produced timber and hides. Later tung oil was extracted from the abundant tung trees and camphor from the camphor trees. Concurrently the wood carving industry developed. At one point, over 80% of local families were employed in wood carving. At the end of the 20th century Sanyi began developing a tourist industry.

== Tourist attractions ==
- Shengxing Station, completed in 1905, is the highest station (402 meters) in Taiwan built along the "Old Mountain Railway". It was built entirely of wood, using no nails, and took five years to complete. The last train stopped at the station on 23 September 1987, because the steep route of the "Old Mountain Railway" could not accommodate the newer, larger trains. Nearby is a 726-meter train tunnel built in 1905. It has successfully withstood a large number of earthquakes, including the quake of 21 September 1999 (921). At the tunnel entrance are some old troop barracks where during World War II local troops were stationed to protect the railway.
- Sanyi Old Street and Mudiao
- Sanyi Wood Sculpture Museum, opened in 1995, shows the development of local wood carving from a craft in the late 19th century to contemporary art of the 21st century.
- Huoyan Mountain Ecology Museum displays detailed information about the geological formation of Huoyan Mountain, as well as the flora and fauna of the area.
- The Tung tree festival is held each year when the tung trees bloom in late April.
- Liyutan Dam
- Longteng Bridge
- West Lake Resortopia

== Transportation ==
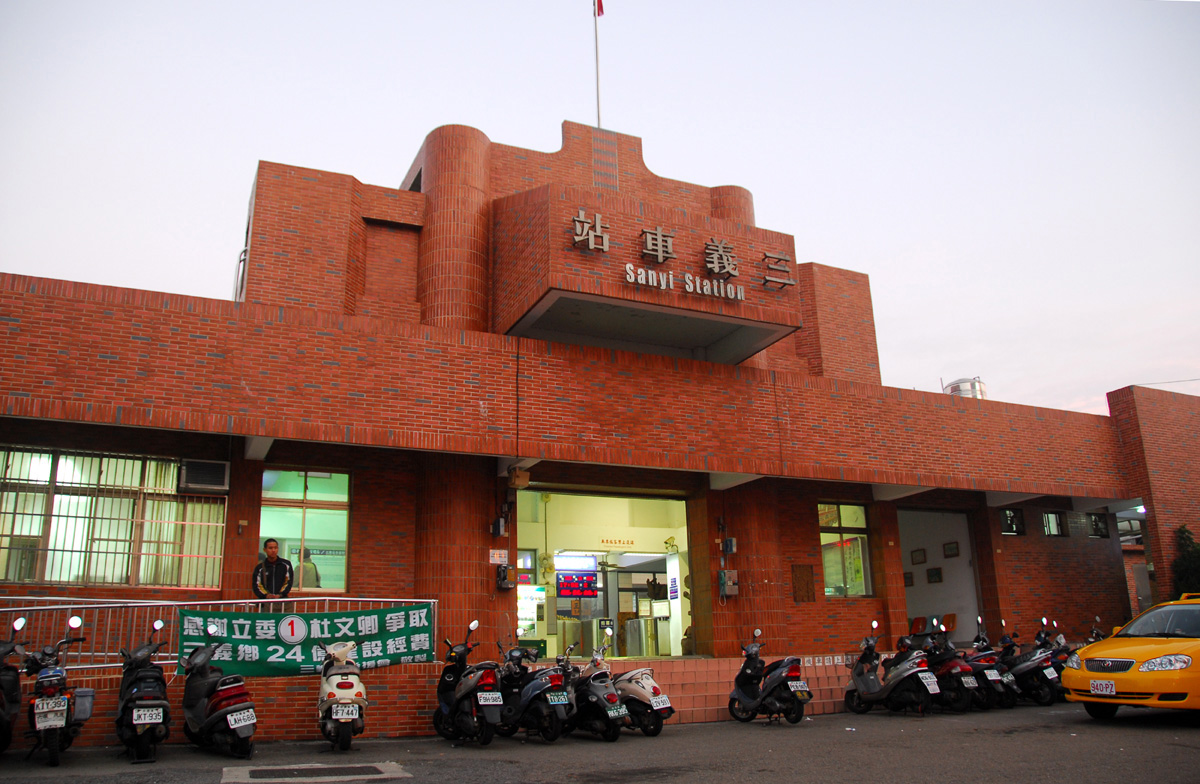
Sanyi Station

- TR Sanyi Station
- TR Shengxing Station
- TR Yutengping Station

== Far Eastern Air Transport 103 ==
- On 22 August 1981, Far Eastern Air Transport Flight 103, a Boeing 737-200, broke apart in midair and the debris crashed into the town, killing all 110 people on board. The cause was discovered to be metal fatigue.

== Notable natives ==
- Luo Shih-feng singer and television host
