= Houli District =

District of Taichung, Taiwan

Houli 后里區 Kōri
- District
- Houli District
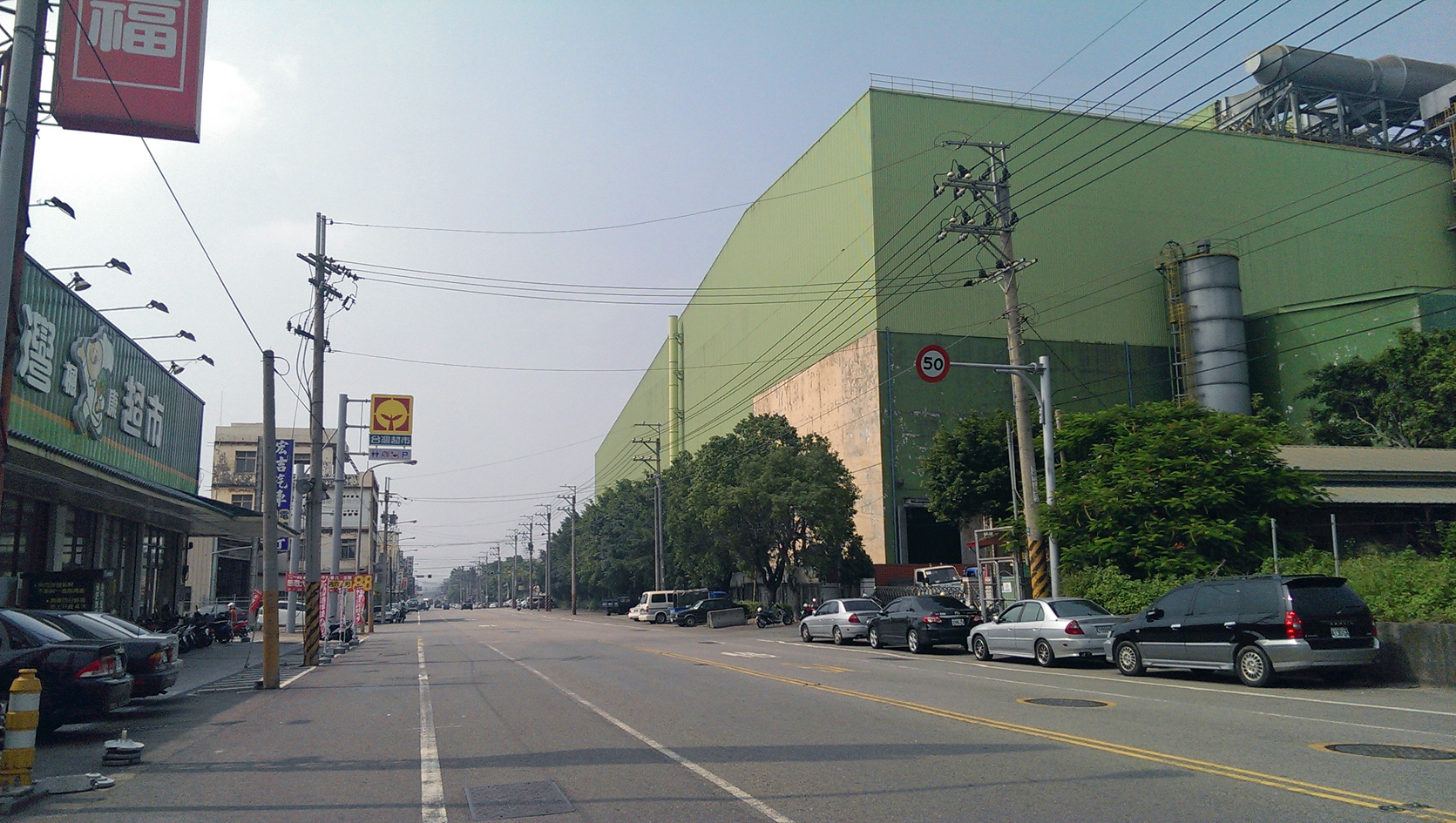

- Houli District in Taichung City
- Coordinates: 24°19′N 120°43′E
- Country: Taiwan
- Special municipality: Taichung
- Established (District): 2010

Area
  - Total: 58.9439 km^{2} (22.7584 sq mi)

Population (February 2023)
  - Total: 53,736
  - Density: 911.65/km^{2} (2,361.2/sq mi)
- Time zone: UTC+8 (CST)
- Website: www.houli.taichung.gov.tw (in Chinese)

Houli District (Chinese: 后里區; pinyin: Hòulǐ Qū) is a rural district in northwestern Taichung City, Taiwan.

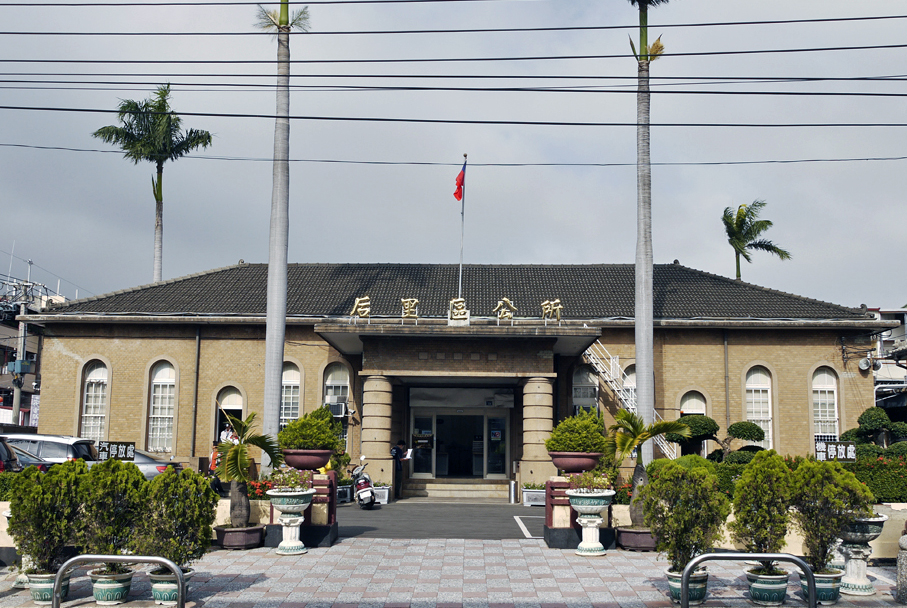
Houli District office

== History ==
After the handover of Taiwan from Japan to the Republic of China in 1945, Houli was organized as a rural township of Taichung County named Neipu Township. On 1 October 1955, Neipu Township was renamed as Houli Township. On 25 December 2010, Taichung County was merged with Taichung City and Houli was upgraded to a district of the city.

== Administrative divisions ==
Guangfu, Renli, Yili, Yide, Houli, Houli, Duntung, Dunxi, Dunnan, Dunbei, Zhonghe, Jiushe, Liange, Taiping, Meishan, Yuemei, Gongguan and Taian Village.

== Local products ==
- Sugar cane
- grapes and wine
- soybean

== Industrial products ==
- Iron plants
- Musical instrument manufacturing. Known locally for Saxophones.

== Military stables ==
Military stables (后里馬場) were built in Houli in mid 1950s and function until today. Stables' main stock includes some of the horses that were given to Taiwan as a gift from Arabia.

== Tourist attractions ==
- Chang Lien-cheng Saxophone Museum
- Lihpao Land
- From 3 November 2018 to 24 April 2019 it will host the Taichung World Flora Exposition

== Notable people ==
- Huang Shu-kuang: Admiral, the current Chief of the General Staff

== Events ==
- 2017 Taichung International Flower Carpet Festival
- 2018 Taichung World Flora Exposition

== Transportation ==
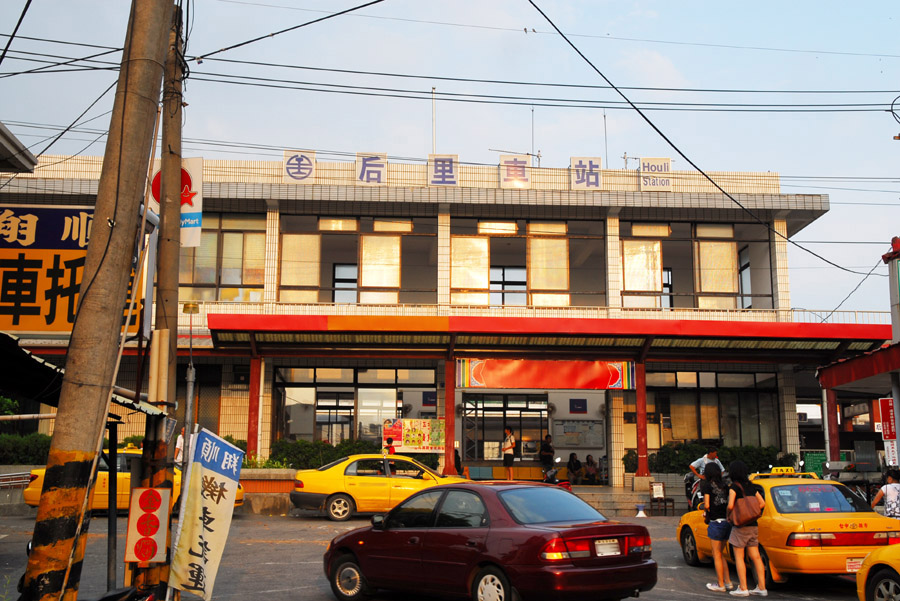
Houli Station

- TR Houli Station
- TR Tai'an Station

Taiwan High Speed Rail passes through the western part of the district, but no station is currently planned.

== See also ==
- Taichung
