= Houli railway station =

Railway station located in Taichung, Taiwan

Houli 后里車站
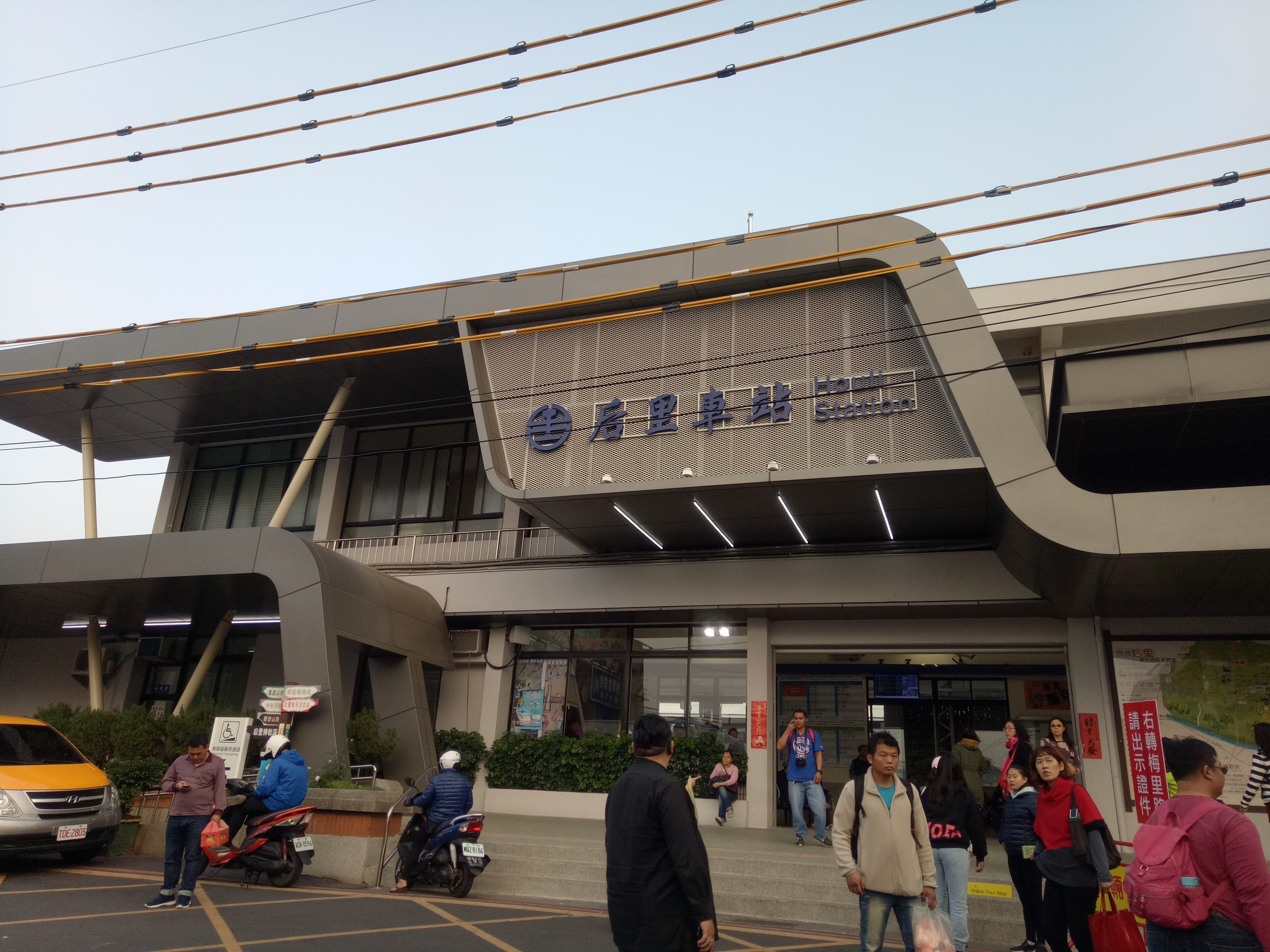

General information
- Location: Houli, Taichung, Taiwan
- Coordinates: 24°18′33.8″N 120°43′58.6″E
- System: Train station
- Owner: Taiwan Railway
- Operator: Taiwan Railway
- Line: Taichung
- Train operators: Taiwan Railway

History
- Opened: 15 May 1905

Services
Preceding station	Taiwan Railway	Following station
Tai'an towards Keelung	Western Trunk line	Fengyuan towards Kaohsiung
Location

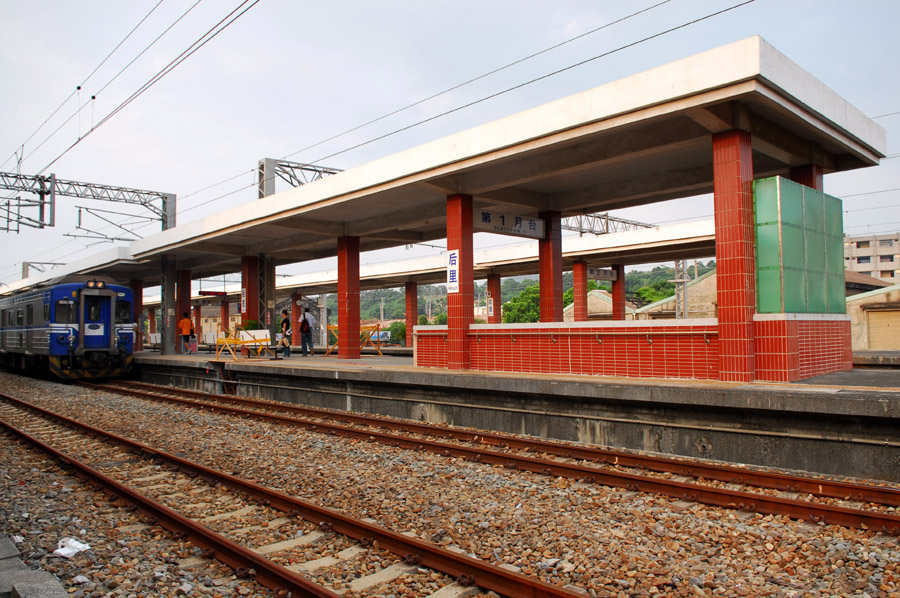
Houli station platform

Houli (Chinese: 后里車站; pinyin: Hòulǐ Chēzhàn) is a railway station on the Taiwan Railway Taichung line located in Houli District, Taichung, Taiwan. It is the teminus of most local trains originating from Chaozhou railway station. It has two platforms used by trains, and another platform, rarely used by railway maintenance vehicles and trains. This station is directly connected to the Houli science park, which is a part of Central Taiwan Science Park.

== History ==
The station was opened on 15 May 1905.

On 4 January 2018, a truck-mounted crane collapsed on an overhead power line at the station, causing a blackout and disrupting electricity supply and train services.

== Around the station ==
- Chang Lien-cheng Saxophone Museum
- Hou-feng Bikeway (Chinese)

== See also ==
- List of railway stations in Taiwan
