= Sanyi railway station =

Railway station located in Miaoli, Taiwan

Sanyi Station 三義車站
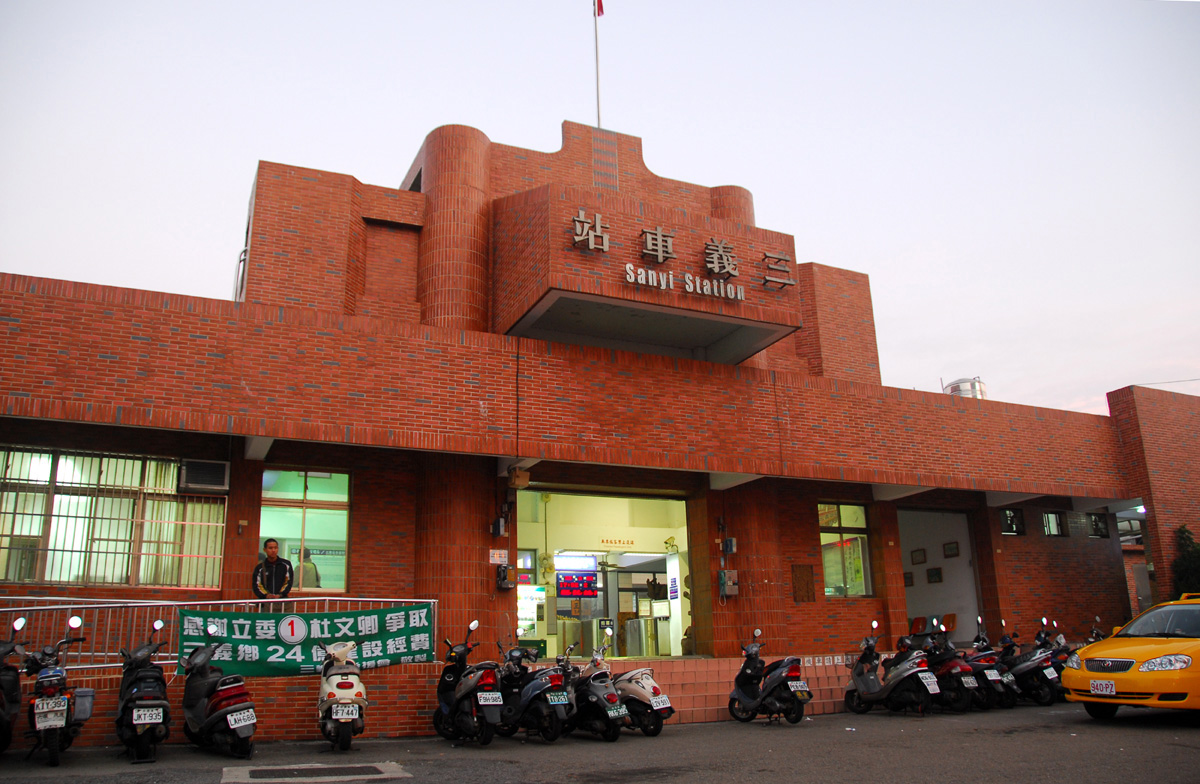

General information
- Location: Sanyi, Miaoli County, Taiwan
- Coordinates: 24°25′17.12″N 120°46′26.53″E
- Owner: Taiwan Railway
- Operator: Taiwan Railway
- Lines: Taichung, Former Mountain
- Train operators: Taiwan Railway

History
- Opened: 7 October 1903

Services
Preceding station	Taiwan Railway	Following station
Tongluo towards Keelung	Western Trunk line	Tai'an towards Kaohsiung
Location

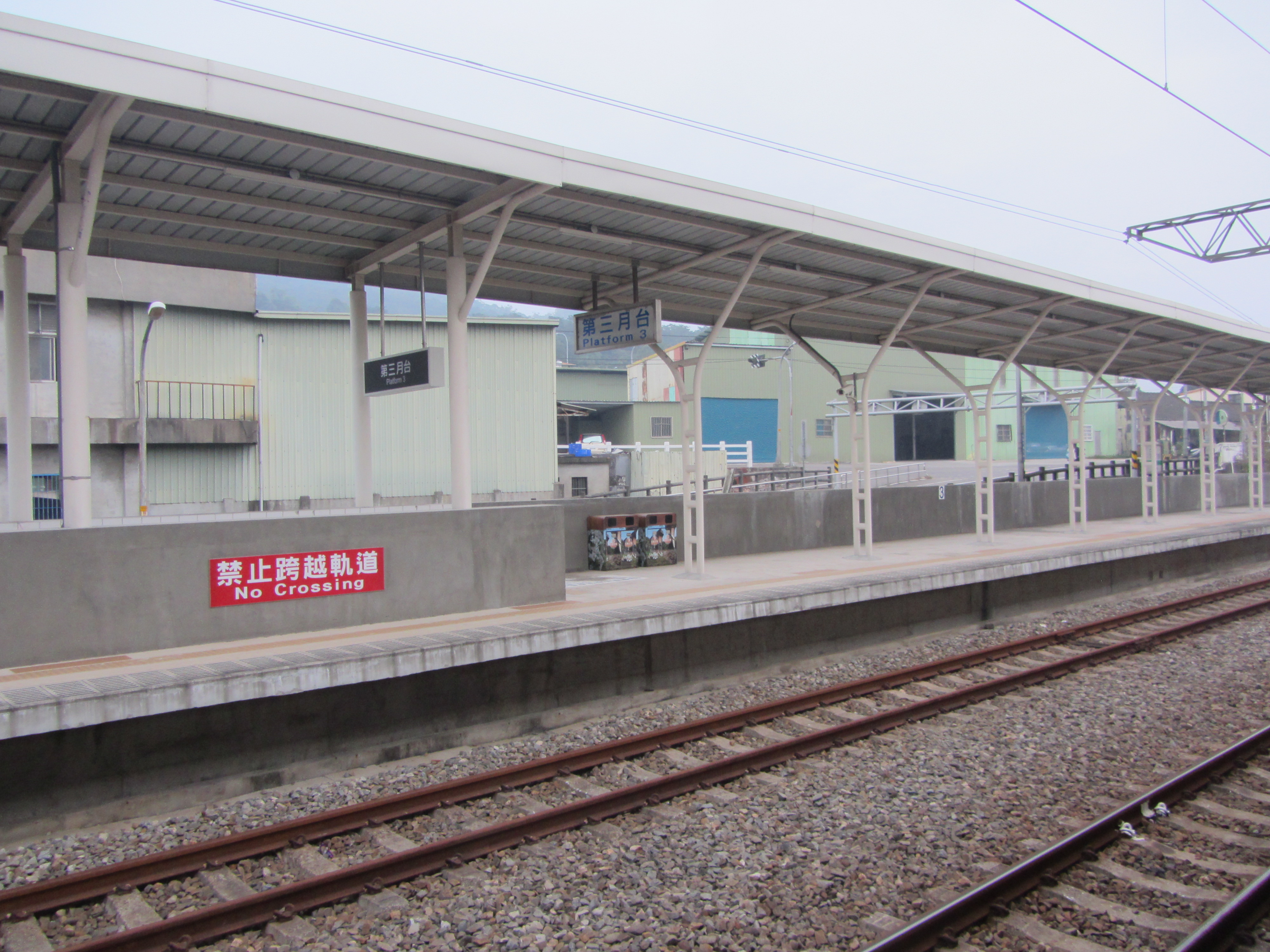
Sanyi station platform

Sanyi (Chinese: 三義車站; pinyin: Sānyì Chēzhàn) is a railway station on Taiwan Railway Taichung line and Former Mountain line. It is located in Sanyi Township, Miaoli County, Taiwan.

== History ==
The station was opened on 7 October 1903.

== Around the station ==
- Huoyan Mountain Ecology Museum
- Sanyi Wood Sculpture Museum
- West Lake Resortopia

== See also ==
- List of railway stations in Taiwan
