= Erwanping railway station =

Railway station in Alishan, Chiayi County, Taiwan

Erwanping Station 二萬平車站
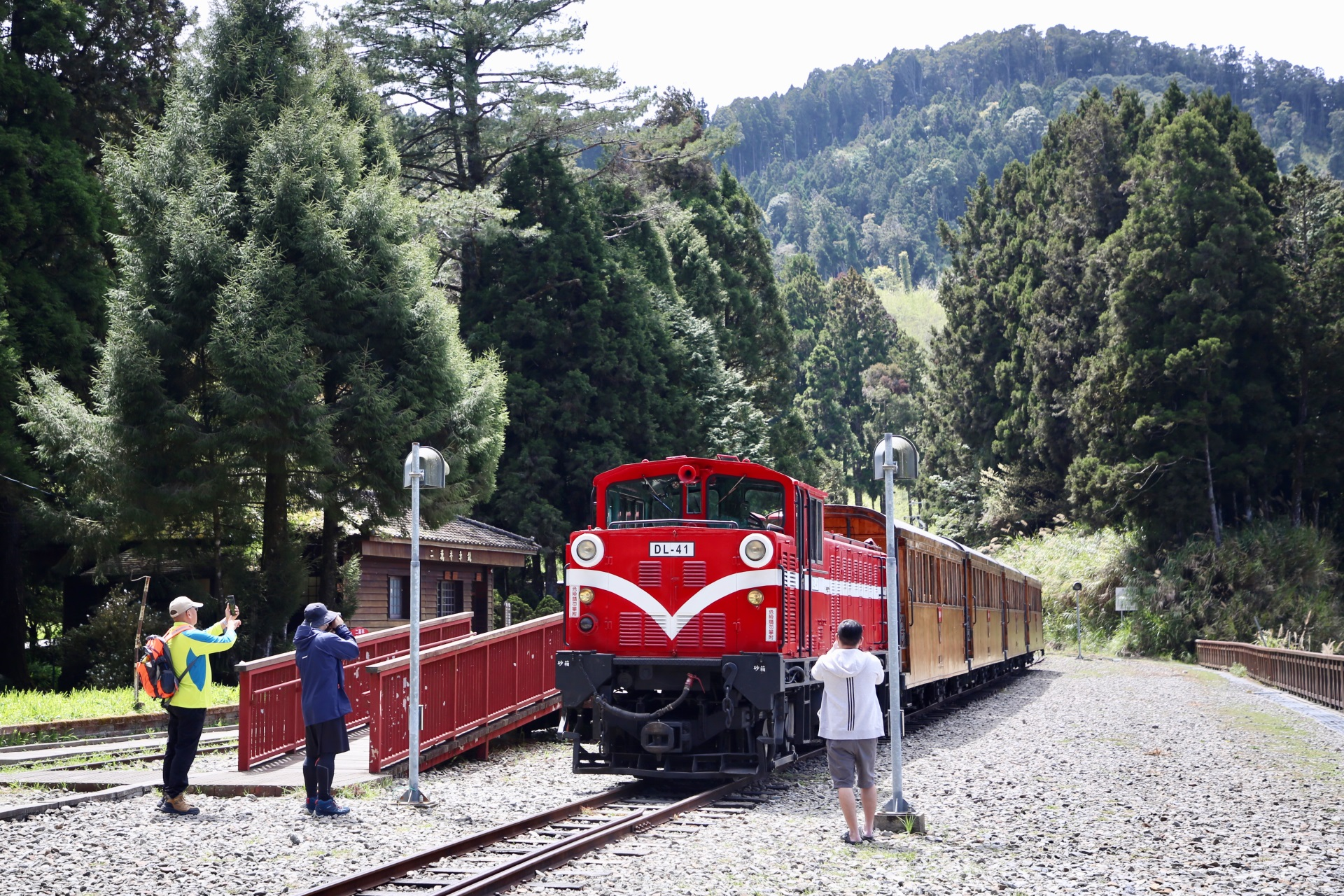

General information
- Location: Alishan, Chiayi County, Taiwan
- Coordinates: 23°30′30.8″N 120°47′26.6″E
- System: Train station
- Owner: Alishan Forest Railway
- Operator: Forestry and Nature Conservation Agency
- Line: Alishan
- Train operators: Alishan Forest Railway

Other information
- Website: Erwanping Station

History
- Opened: 1 October 1912

Services
Preceding station	Alishan Forest Railway	Following station
Shenmu towards Alishan	Main line	Pingzhena towards Chiayi
Location

Erwanping (Chinese: 二萬平車站; pinyin: Èrwànpíng Chēzhàn) is a railway station on the Alishan Forest Railway line located in Alishan Township, Chiayi County, Taiwan.

== History ==
The station was opened on 1 October 1912 as the terminal station of Alishan Forest Railway. In 1914, the railway further expanded and the terminal station changed to Zhaoping Station.

== Nearby stations ==
Pingzhena <-- Alishan Forest railway --> Shenmu

== See also ==
- List of railway stations in Taiwan
