= Fenqihu =

Town in Zhuqi, Chiayi County, Taiwan

Fenqihu 奮起湖
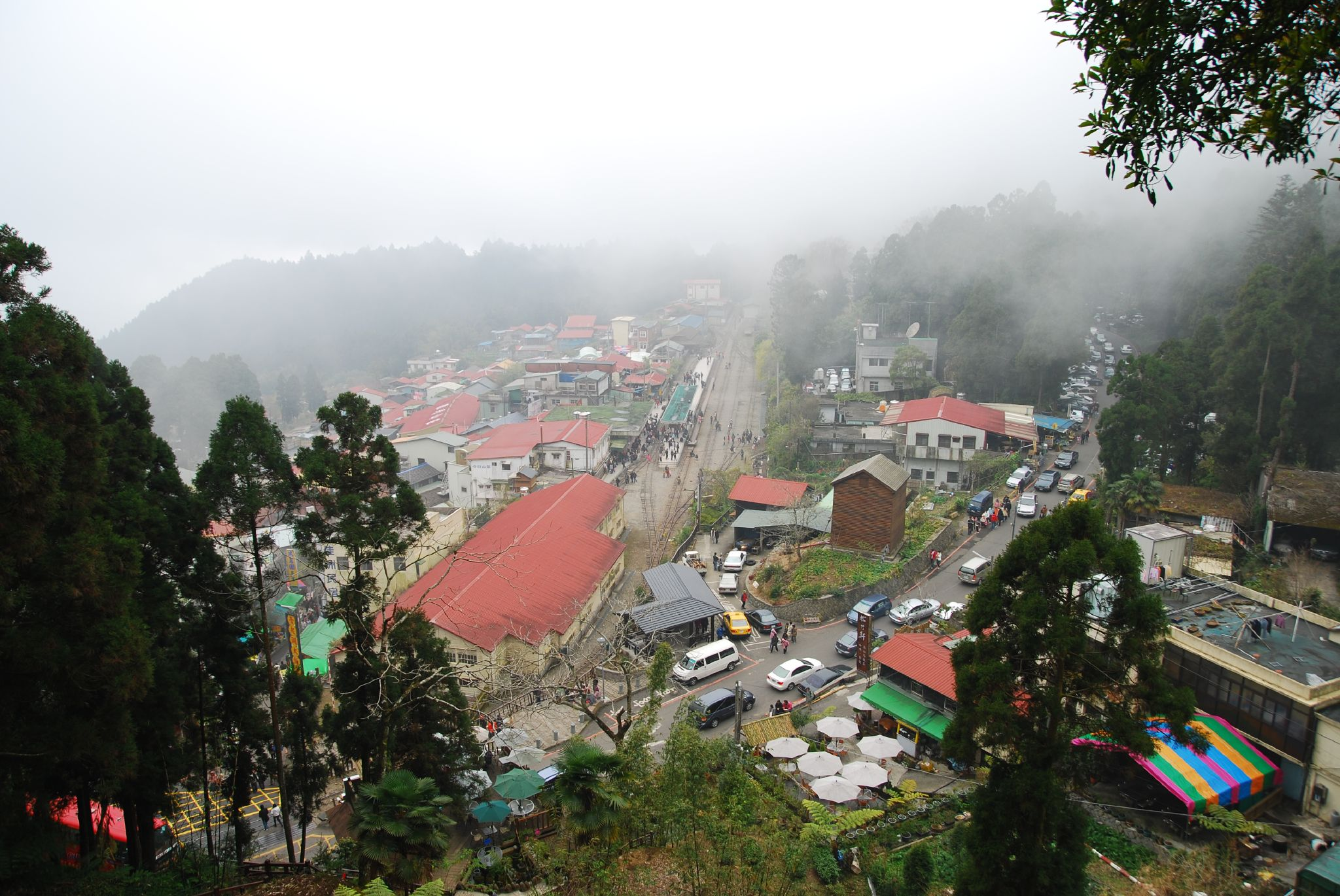

- Location within Chiayi County
- Coordinates: 23°30′17.1″N 120°41′43.1″E

Fenqihu or Fenchihu (Chinese: 奮起湖; pinyin: Fènqǐhú) is a settlement in Zhuqi Township, Chiayi County, Taiwan. Fenqihu is a railway town on the Alishan Forest Railway and is known for their railway bento.

== Etymology ==
The town used to be known as Pùn-ki-ôo (Chinese: 畚箕湖; pinyin: Běnjīhú) in Taiwanese Hokkien, which literally means "dustpan lake". The name comes from how mountains surround the town on three sides. The character ôo (Chinese: 湖; pinyin: hú) refers to the basin that the town sits in; there is no lake at the town.

== History ==
People began settling in Fenqihu before the Alishan Forest Railway, but the town remained quite small. In 1912, the railway tracks were extended to Fenqihu. In the past, there was one train service in each direction each day; since Fenqihu was located roughly in the middle of the route, the two steam locomotives would both stop here around noon to add coal and water. Passengers were free to walk into the town, so locals began selling railway bento to these passengers to eat, and the town grew rapidly.

== Architecture ==
Fenqihu Old Street is 500 meters in length with buildings along the street were built following the slope of the street which sits on a hill slope.

Due to the influence of tourism in Fenchihu, this old street, with the highest elevation in Taiwan, has become one of the must see attractions when traveling to Alishan.

== Transportation ==
The town is served by Fenqihu railway station of Alishan Forest Railway along with a bus station for the large tour buses on the main road through town.

The retired #18 Shay locomotive is on display at this train station.

== Climate ==
Climate data for Fenqihu, elevation 1,385 m (4,544 ft), (2016–2023 normals, extremes 2016–present)
Month	Jan	Feb	Mar	Apr	May	Jun	Jul	Aug	Sep	Oct	Nov	Dec	Year
Record high °C (°F)	22.0 (71.6)	26.2 (79.2)	27.9 (82.2)	28.6 (83.5)	28.8 (83.8)	27.5 (81.5)	29.2 (84.6)	28.5 (83.3)	27.7 (81.9)	27.9 (82.2)	27.2 (81.0)	24.1 (75.4)	29.2 (84.6)
Mean daily maximum °C (°F)	17.7 (63.9)	18.1 (64.6)	19.5 (67.1)	21.4 (70.5)	23.4 (74.1)	24.4 (75.9)	24.8 (76.6)	24.2 (75.6)	24.1 (75.4)	22.6 (72.7)	21.6 (70.9)	18.8 (65.8)	21.7 (71.1)
Daily mean °C (°F)	13.8 (56.8)	14.5 (58.1)	16.5 (61.7)	18.0 (64.4)	20.2 (68.4)	20.8 (69.4)	21.1 (70.0)	20.9 (69.6)	20.7 (69.3)	19.5 (67.1)	17.7 (63.9)	15.5 (59.9)	18.3 (64.9)
Mean daily minimum °C (°F)	9.6 (49.3)	9.8 (49.6)	11.6 (52.9)	13.9 (57.0)	16.4 (61.5)	17.3 (63.1)	17.8 (64.0)	17.7 (63.9)	17.2 (63.0)	15.7 (60.3)	13.7 (56.7)	11.0 (51.8)	14.3 (57.8)
Record low °C (°F)	0.3 (32.5)	2.2 (36.0)	3.4 (38.1)	5.4 (41.7)	11.9 (53.4)	13.6 (56.5)	15.9 (60.6)	15.9 (60.6)	14.4 (57.9)	9.4 (48.9)	8.9 (48.0)	2.8 (37.0)	0.3 (32.5)
Average precipitation mm (inches)	51.5 (2.03)	66.8 (2.63)	105.1 (4.14)	163.3 (6.43)	485.9 (19.13)	645.4 (25.41)	681.3 (26.82)	830.9 (32.71)	409.3 (16.11)	135.1 (5.32)	40.2 (1.58)	45.9 (1.81)	3,660.7 (144.12)
Average precipitation days	7.5	7.8	9.8	12.7	19.7	21.4	21.9	24.0	18.2	11.3	6.3	7.5	168.1
Average relative humidity (%)	84.9	85.2	86.8	88.5	91.4	92.4	93.5	95.0	94.0	93.1	89.1	86.4	90.0
Source 1: Central Weather Administration
Source 2: Atmospheric Science Research and Application Databank (precipitation 1994–2020, precipitation days and humidity 2000–2023)

== See also ==
- Alishan National Scenic Area
