= Yuntan Waterfall =

Waterfall in Meishan, Chiayi County, Taiwan

Yuntan Waterfall 雲潭瀑布
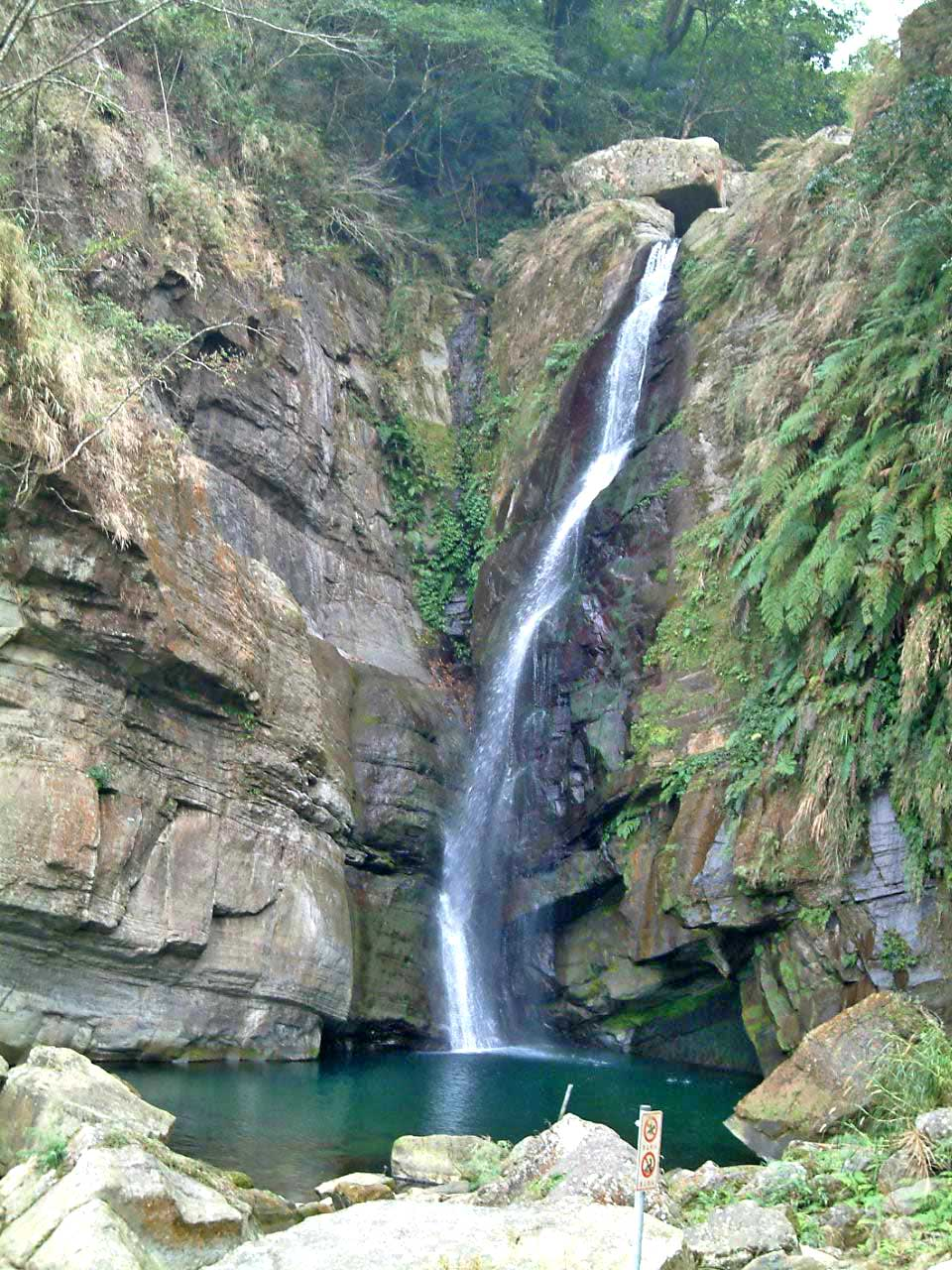
- Interactive map of Yuntan Waterfall 雲潭瀑布
- Location: Meishan, Chiayi County, Taiwan
- Coordinates: 23°31′58.0″N 120°39′23.6″E
- Type: waterfall
- Total height: 200 m (660 ft)

The Yuntan Waterfall (traditional Chinese: 雲潭瀑布; simplified Chinese: 云潭瀑布; pinyin: Pénglái Pùbù) is a waterfall in Meishan Township, Chiayi County, Taiwan.

== Geology ==
The waterfall stands at a height of 200 meters divided over three levels.

== Transportation ==
The waterfall is accessible within walking distance east of Jiaoliping Station of Alishan Forest Railway.

== See also ==
- List of waterfalls
