= Liyuanliao railway station =

Railway station in Meishan, Chiayi County, Taiwan

Liyuanliao Station 梨園寮車站
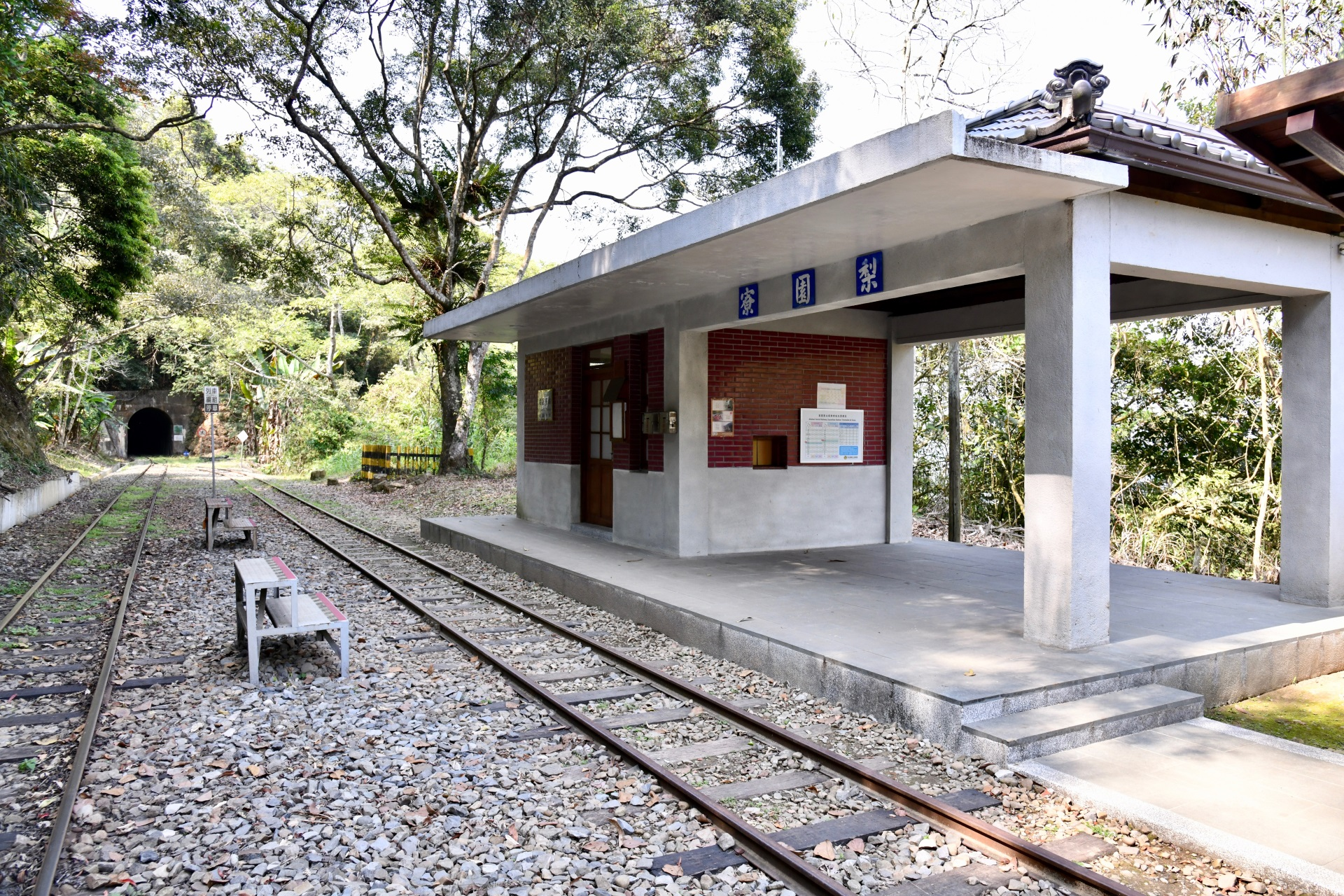

General information
- Location: Meishan, Chiayi County, Taiwan
- Coordinates: 23°32′31.9″N 120°37′12.8″E
- Owner: Forestry and Nature Conservation Agency
- Operator: Alishan Forest Railway
- Platforms: 1
- Tracks: 1

History
- Opened: 1 October 1912

Services
Preceding station	Alishan Forest Railway	Following station
Jiaoliping towards Alishan	Main line	Dulishan towards Chiayi
Location

Liyuanliao (traditional Chinese: 梨園寮車站; simplified Chinese: 梨园寮车站; pinyin: Líyuánliáo Chēzhàn) is an unstaffed railway station on the Alishan Forest Railway line located in Meishan Township, Chiayi County, Taiwan.

== History ==
The station was opened on 1 October 1912. After 1985, the station became unattended.

== Architecture ==
The station is located 905 meters above sea level.

== See also ==
- List of railway stations in Taiwan
