= Zhangnaoliao railway station =

Railway station in Zhuqi, Chiayi County, Taiwan

Zhangnaoliao Station 樟腦寮車站
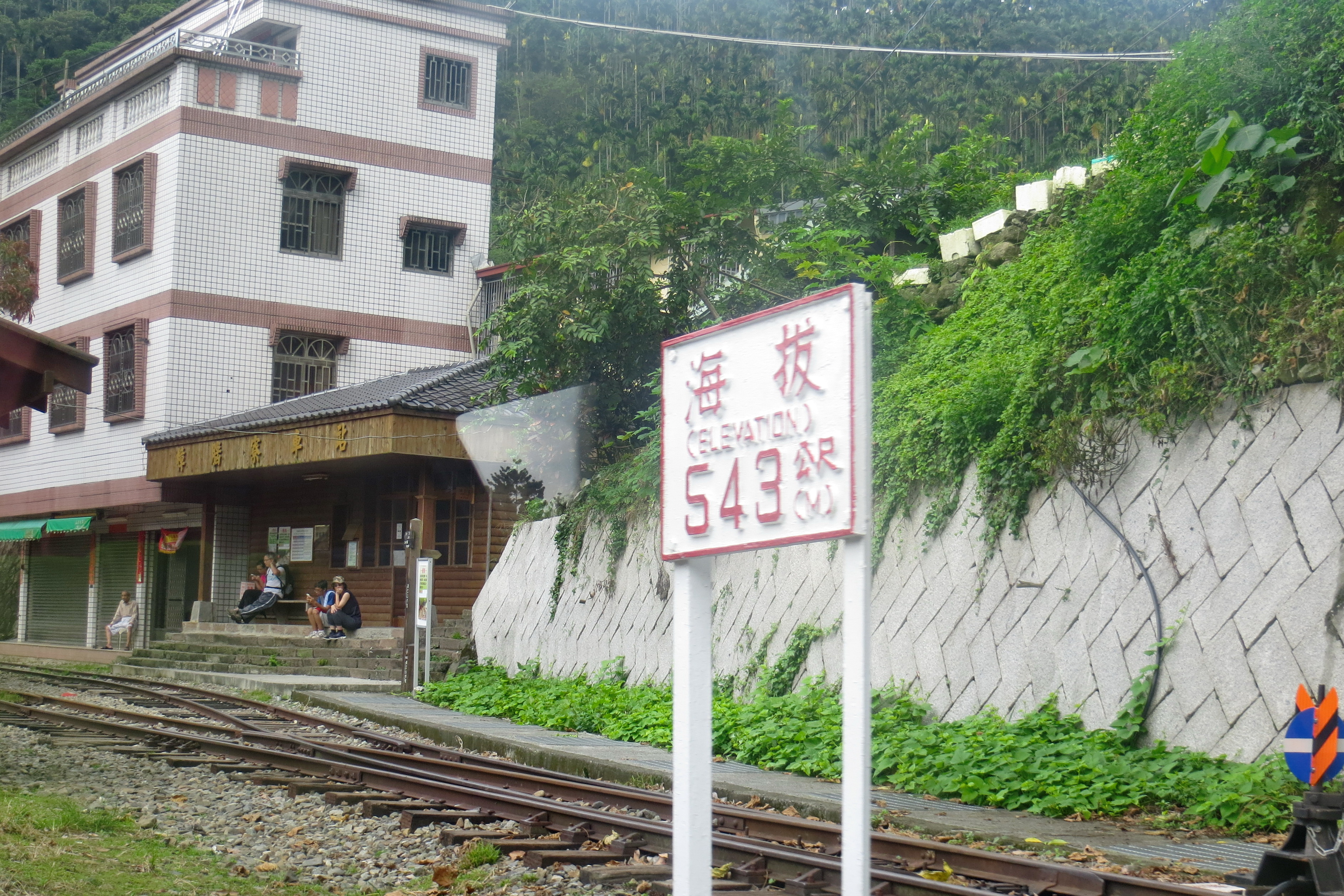

General information
- Location: Zhuqi, Chiayi County, Taiwan
- Coordinates: 23°31′58.3″N 120°36′09.2″E
- Owner: Forestry and Nature Conservation Agency
- Operator: Alishan Forest Railway
- Line: Alishan

Other information
- Website: Zhangnaoliao Station

History
- Opened: 1 October 1912

Services
Preceding station	Alishan Forest Railway	Following station
Dulishan towards Alishan	Main line	Mululiao towards Chiayi
Location

Zhangnaoliao (Chinese: 樟腦寮車站; pinyin: Zhāngnǎoliáo Chēzhàn) is a railway station on the Alishan Forest Railway line located in Zhuqi Township, Chiayi County, Taiwan.

== History ==
The station was opened on 1 October 1912. It used to be an important supplying place of camphor trees.

== Architecture ==
The station is located 543 meters above sea level. It is a zig zag station.

== See also ==
- List of railway stations in Taiwan
