= Shizilu railway station =

Railway station in Alishan, Chiayi County, Taiwan

Shizilu Railway Station 十字路車站
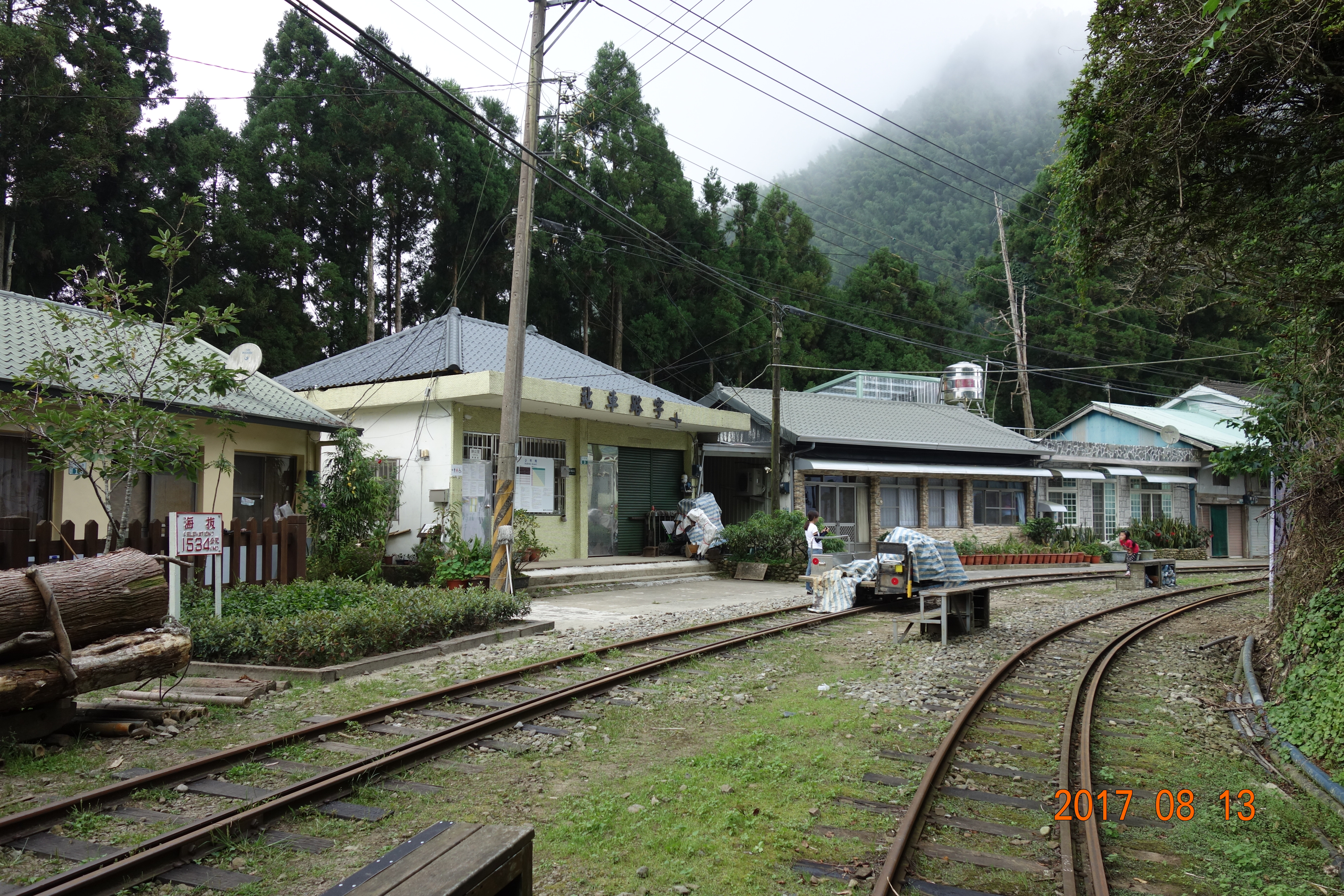

General information
- Location: Alishan, Chiayi County, Taiwan
- Coordinates: 23°29′33.9″N 120°45′17.1″E
- System: Train station
- Owner: Forestry and Nature Conservation Agency
- Operator: Alishan Forest Railway
- Platforms: 1
- Tracks: 1

History
- Opened: 1 October 1912

Services
Preceding station	Alishan Forest Railway	Following station
Pingzhena towards Alishan	Main line	Duolin towards Chiayi
Location

Shizilu (Chinese: 十字路車站; pinyin: Shízìlù Chēzhàn) is a railway station on the Alishan Forest Railway line located in Alishan Township, Chiayi County, Taiwan.

== History ==
The station was opened on 1 October 1912.

== See also ==
- List of railway stations in Taiwan
