= Pingzhena railway station =

Railway station in Alishan, Chiayi County, Taiwan

Pingzhena Station 屏遮那車站 Heesiana

General information
- Location: Alishan, Chiayi County, Taiwan
- Coordinates: 23°30′40.1″N 120°46′48.7″E
- System: Railway station
- Owner: Alishan Forest Railway
- Operator: Forestry and Nature Conservation Agency
- Line: Alishan
- Train operators: Alishan Forest Railway

History
- Opened: 25 December 1912
- Closed: 6 July 2024

Services
Preceding station	Alishan Forest Railway	Following station
Erwanping towards Alishan	Main line No passenger service	Shizilu towards Chiayi
Location

Pingzhena (traditional Chinese: 屏遮那車站; simplified Chinese: 屏遮那车站; pinyin: Píngzhēnà Chēzhàn) is a railway station on the Alishan Forest Railway line located in Alishan Township, Chiayi County, Taiwan.

== History ==
The station was opened on 25 December 1912. It serve as a circuit control point since the resume of Chiayi Line services. The original station site is located next to the west end of Tunnel No.46, which is destroyed by the Morakot typhoon .

== Nearby stations ==
Shizilu <-- Alishan Forest railway --> Erwanping

== See also ==
- List of railway stations in Taiwan
