= Shueisheliao railway station =

Railway station in Zhuqi, Chiayi County, Taiwan

Shuisheliao Station 水社寮車站
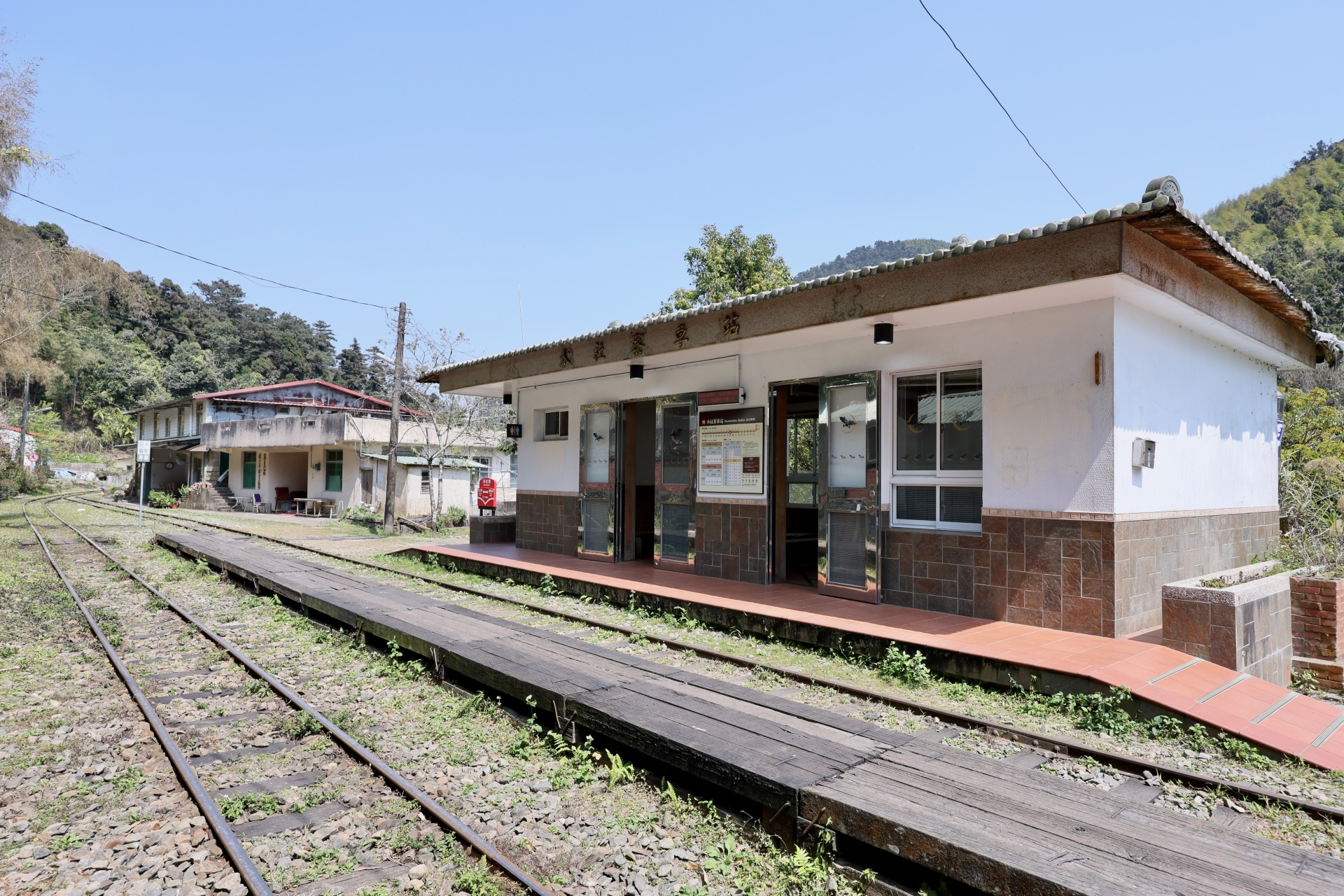

General information
- Location: Zhuqi, Chiayi County, Taiwan
- Coordinates: 23°30′15.8″N 120°39′34.3″E
- Owner: Forestry and Nature Conservation Agency
- Operator: Alishan Forest Railway
- Platforms: 1
- Tracks: 1

History
- Opened: 1 October 1910

Services
Preceding station	Alishan Forest Railway	Following station
Fenqihu towards Alishan	Main line	Jiaoliping towards Chiayi
Location

Shuisheliao (Chinese: 水社寮車站; pinyin: Shuǐshèliáo Chēzhàn) is a railway station on the Alishan Forest Railway line located in Zhuqi Township, Chiayi County, Taiwan.

== History ==
The station was opened on 1 October 1910. In the 1990s the station became unattended.

== Architecture ==
The station is located at an elevation of 1,186 meters above sea level.

== See also ==
- List of railway stations in Taiwan
