= Zhuqi railway station =

Railway station in Zhuqi, Chiayi County, Taiwan

Zhuqi Station 竹崎車站
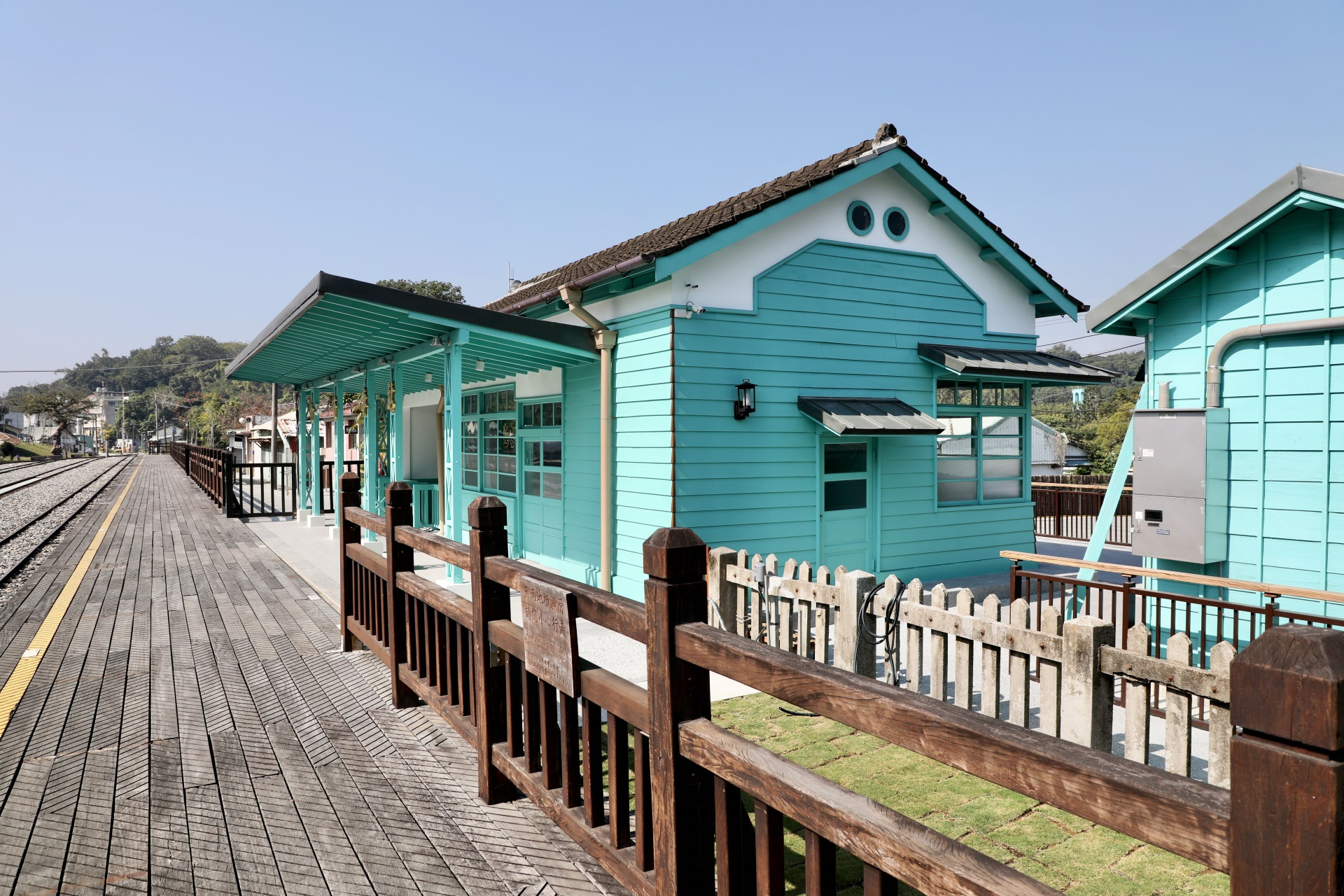

General information
- Location: Zhuqi, Chiayi County, Taiwan
- Coordinates: 23°31′33.24″N 120°33′13.65″E
- Owner: Forestry and Nature Conservation Agency
- Operator: Alishan Forest Railway
- Line: Alishan

History
- Opened: 1 October 1912

Services
| Preceding station | Alishan Forest Railway | Following station |
|---|---|---|
| Mululiao towards Alishan | Main line | Lumachan towards Chiayi |
Location

Zhuqi (Chinese: 竹崎車站; pinyin: Zhúqí Chēzhàn) is a railway station on the Alishan Forest Railway line located in Zhuqi Township, Chiayi County, Taiwan. It is the start of the uphill section of the railway line.

== History ==
The station was constructed in 1906-1910 and opened on 1 October 1912. In 1952, the station underwent renovation and turned into what it is today.

== Architecture ==
The station is located 127 meters above sea level. Since the station is the dividing point between the flat and uphill sections of the railway, there is a wye to the east of the station used for moving the locomotive to the back of the train, or to switch the locomotive entirely.

== See also ==
- List of railway stations in Taiwan
