= Fenqihu railway station =

Railway station in Zhuqi, Chiayi County, Taiwan

Fenqihu Station 奮起湖車站
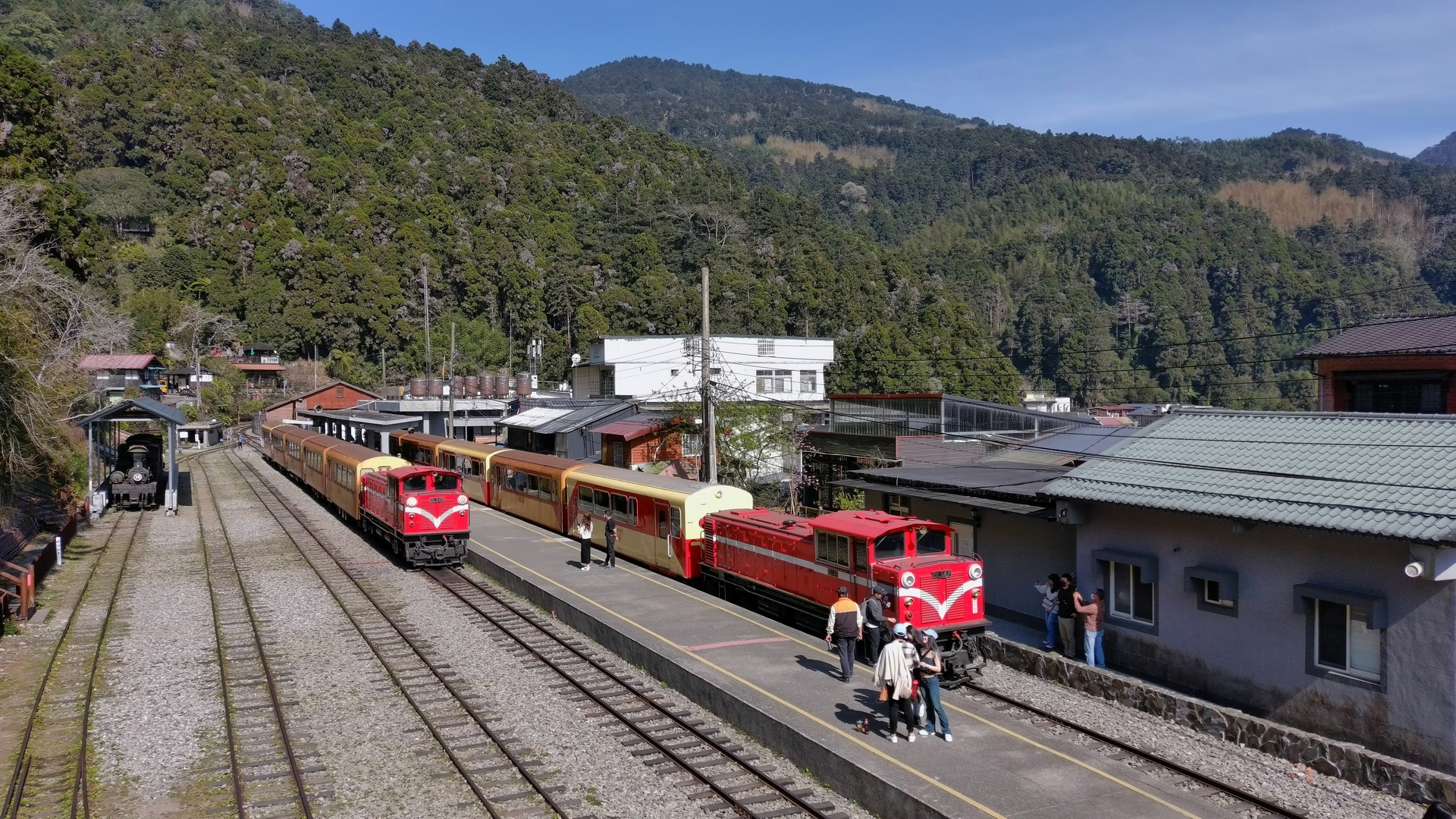

General information
- Location: Zhuqi, Chiayi County, Taiwan
- Coordinates: 23°30′19.2″N 120°41′42.4″E
- Owner: Forestry and Nature Conservation Agency
- Operator: Alishan Forest Railway
- Platforms: 2
- Tracks: 3

History
- Opened: 1 October 1912

Services
Preceding station	Alishan Forest Railway	Following station
Duolin towards Alishan	Main line	Shueisheliao towards Chiayi
Location

Fenqihu (Chinese: 奮起湖車站; pinyin: Fènqǐhú Chēzhàn) is a railway station on the Alishan Forest Railway line located in Zhuqi Township, Chiayi County, Taiwan.

== History ==
The station was opened on 1 October 1912. In September 2015, a section of the railway between Fenqihu Station and Alishan Station was badly damaged by Typhoon Dujuan. After restoration efforts, a successful trial run of the train between Beimen Station and Alishan Station was made on 16 September 2015.

== Around the station ==
- Fenchihu Old Street

== See also ==
- List of railway stations in Taiwan
