= Duolin railway station =

Railway station in Alishan, Chiayi County, Taiwan

Duolin Station 多林車站
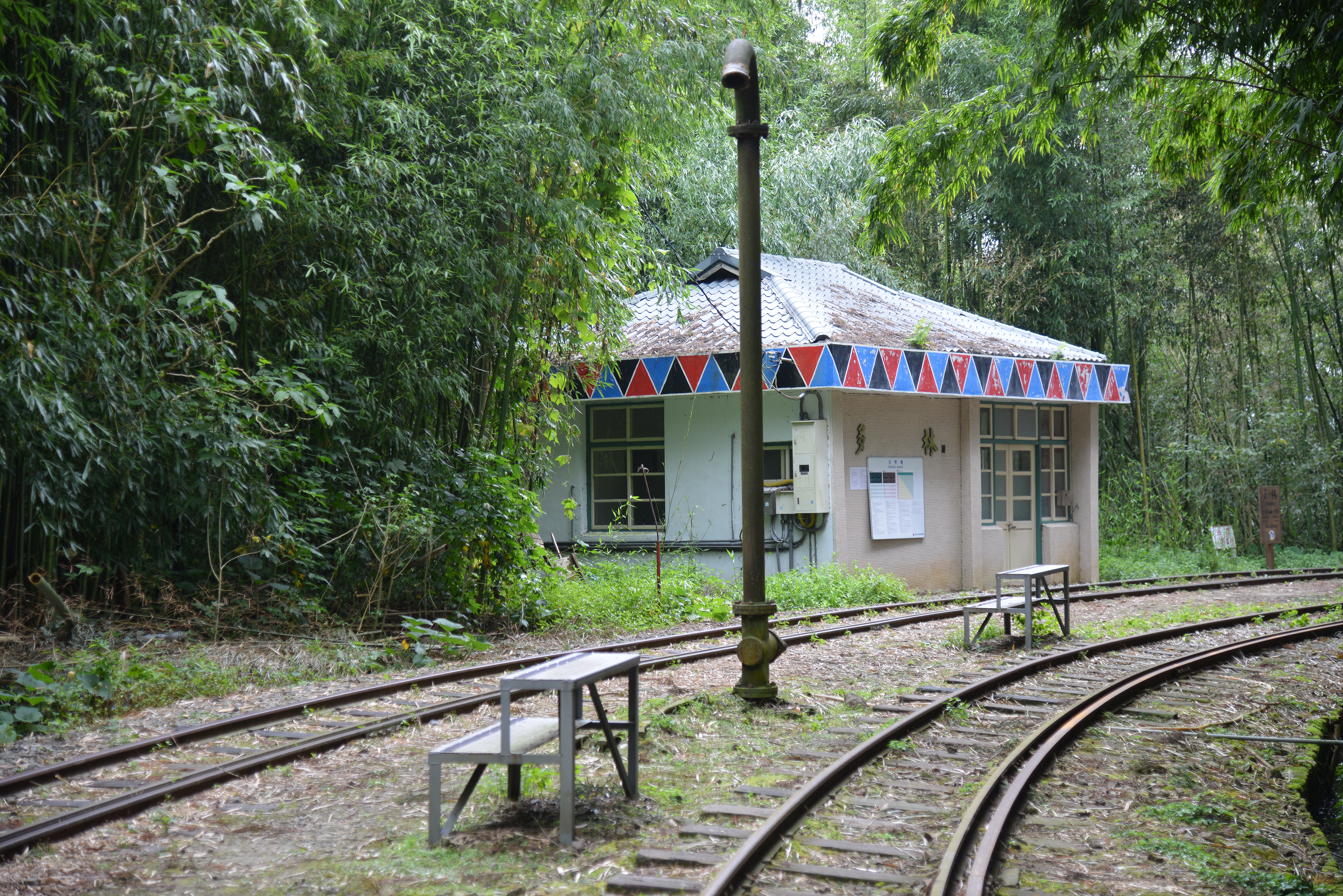
- Duolin Station in the bamboo forest

General information
- Location: Alishan, Chiayi County, Taiwan
- Coordinates: 23°29′54.7″N 120°43′50.2″E
- Owner: Forestry and Nature Conservation Agency
- Operator: Alishan Forest Railway

Other information
- Website: Duolin Station

History
- Opened: 1 October 1912

Services
Preceding station	Alishan Forest Railway	Following station
Shizilu towards Alishan	Main line	Fenqihu towards Chiayi
Location

Duolin (Chinese: 多林車站; pinyin: Duōlín Chēzhàn) is a railway station on the Alishan Forest Railway line located in Shihzih Village, Alishan Township, Chiayi County, Taiwan.

== History ==
The station was opened on 1 October 1912.

== See also ==
- List of railway stations in Taiwan
