= Dulishan railway station =

Railway station in Zhuqi, Chiayi County, Taiwan

Dulishan Station 獨立山車站
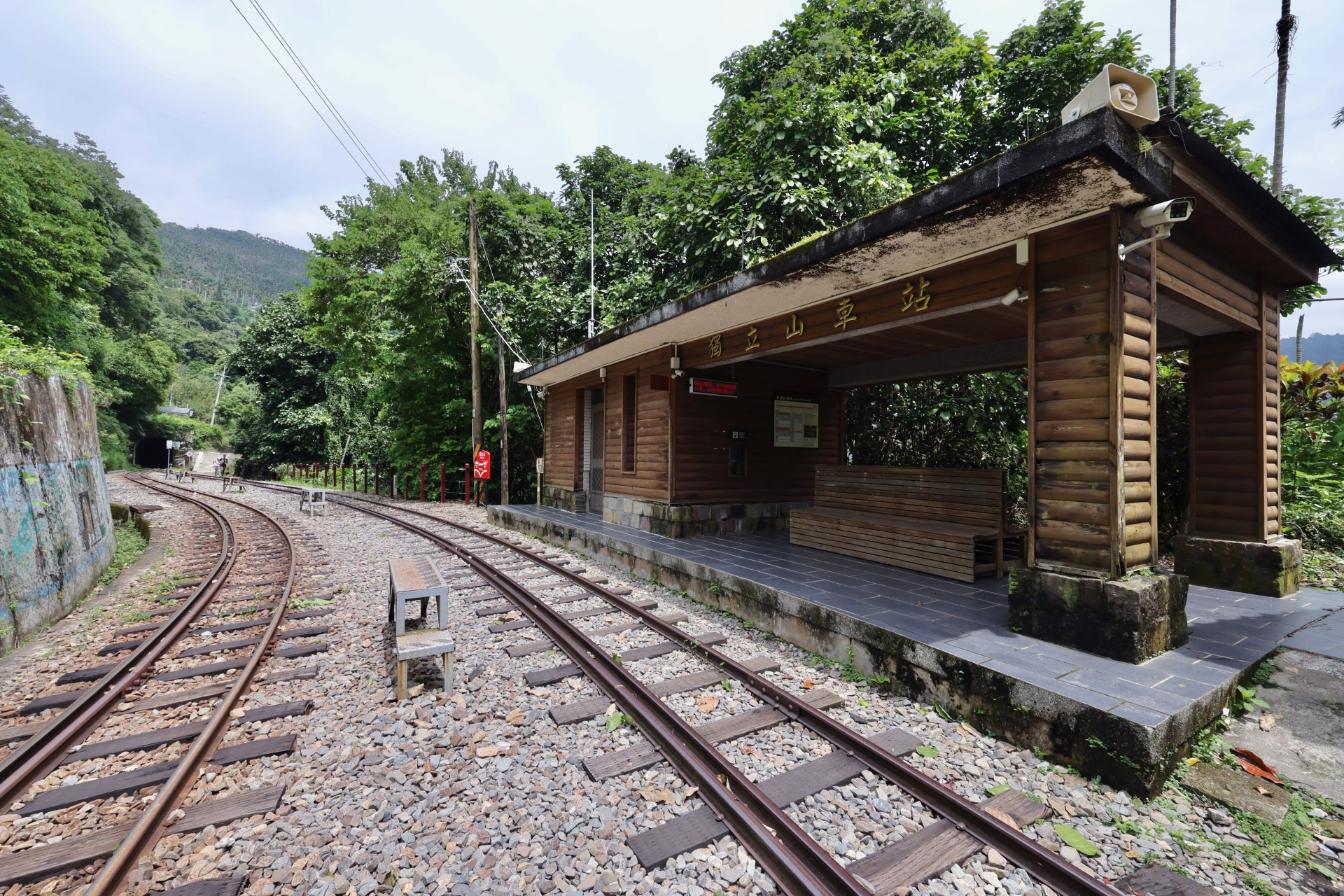

General information
- Location: Zhuqi, Chiayi County, Taiwan
- Coordinates: 23°32′18.8″N 120°36′27.0″E
- Owner: Forestry and Nature Conservation Agency
- Operator: Alishan Forest Railway

History
- Opened: 1 October 1912

Services
Preceding station	Alishan Forest Railway	Following station
Liyuanliao towards Alishan	Main line	Zhangnaoliao towards Chiayi
Location

Dulishan (Chinese: 獨立山車站; pinyin: Dúlìshān Chēzhàn) is a railway station on the Alishan Forest Railway line located in Zhuqi Township, Chiayi County, Taiwan. It is situated on the "Dulishan Spiral" portion of the line.

== History ==
The station was opened on 1 October 1912.

== Architecture ==
The station is located at 743 meters above sea level. The station houses the water crane used to fill water at the steam locomotives of the trains passing through.

== See also ==
- List of railway stations in Taiwan
