= Alishan Museum =

Museum in Alishan, Chiayi County, Taiwan

- 阿里山博物館
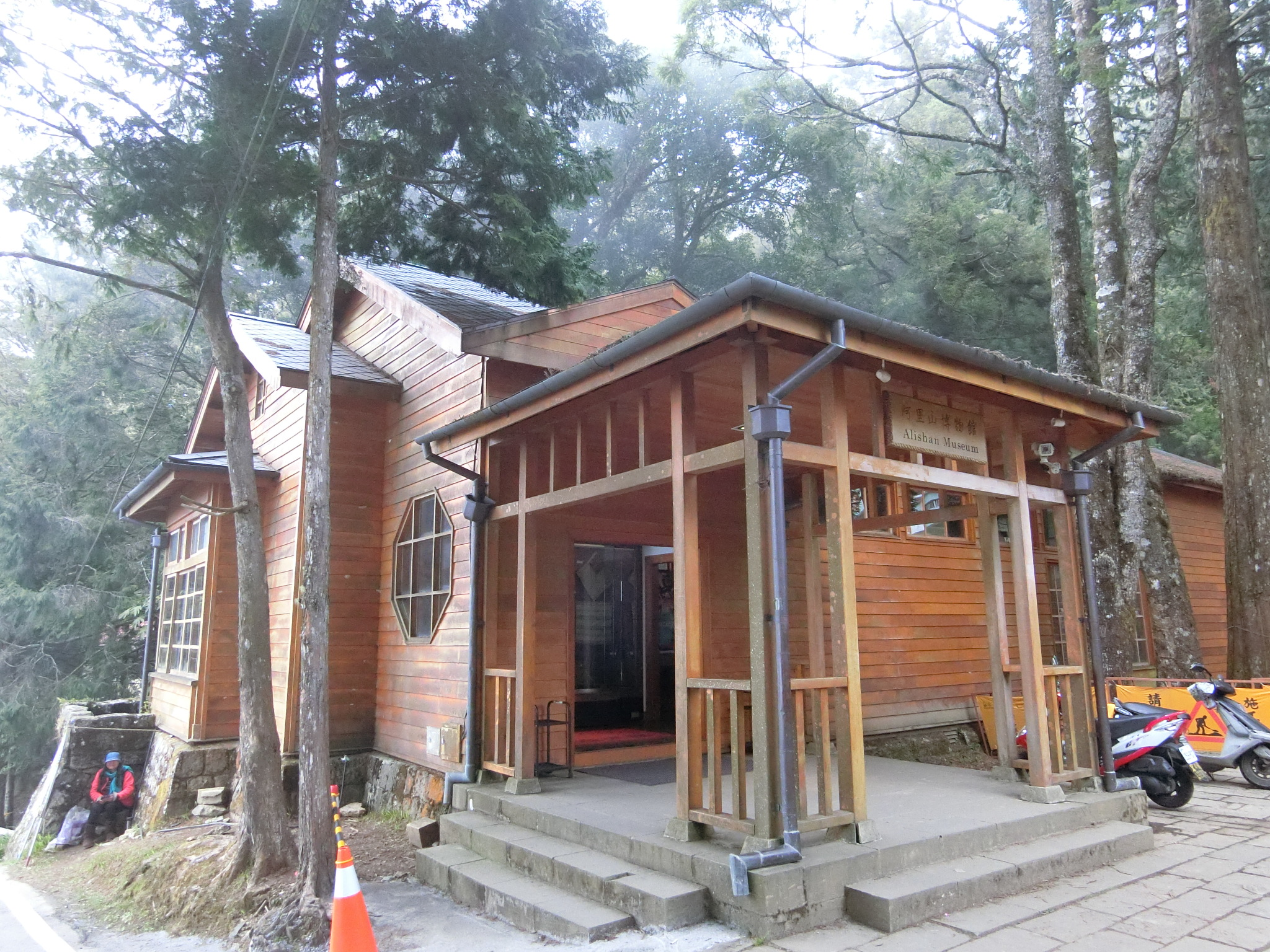
- Established: 1935
- Location: Alishan, Chiayi County, Taiwan
- Coordinates: 23°31′00.6″N 120°48′30″E
- Type: museum
- Public transit access: Zhaoping Station

The Alishan Museum (traditional Chinese: 阿里山博物館; simplified Chinese: 阿里山博物馆; pinyin: Ālǐshān Bówùguǎn) is a museum in Alishan National Scenic Area, Alishan Township, Chiayi County, Taiwan.

== History ==
The museum was established in 1935. In 2007, it underwent renovation.

== Architecture ==
The museum was built using cypress woods originating from the area around the museum.

== Exhibitions ==
The museum exhibits the history of logging in Alishan, original culture in the region, preservation efforts of the roads around the forest and the development of Alishan Forest Railway.

== Transportation ==
The museum is accessible within walking distance northwest Zhaoping Station of Alishan Forest Railway.

== See also ==
- List of museums in Taiwan
