= Jiaoliping railway station =

Railway station in Zhuqi, Chiayi County, Taiwan

Jiaoliping Station 交力坪車站
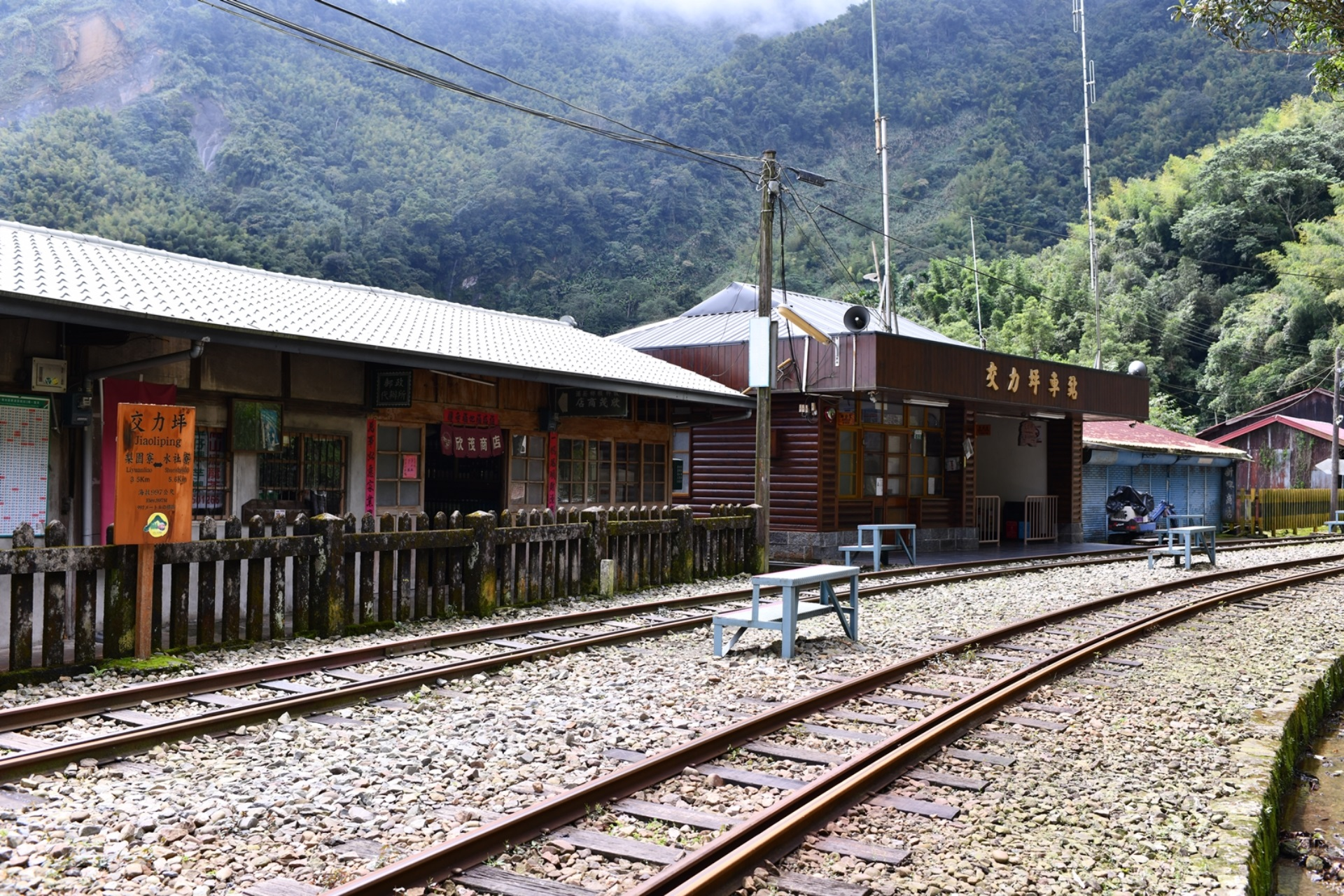

General information
- Location: Zhuqi, Chiayi County, Taiwan
- Coordinates: 23°31′53.6″N 120°38′37.8″E
- Owner: Forestry and Nature Conservation Agency
- Operator: Alishan Forest Railway
- Platforms: 1
- Tracks: 2

History
- Opened: 1 October 1912

Services
Preceding station	Alishan Forest Railway	Following station
Shueisheliao towards Alishan	Main line	Liyuanliao towards Chiayi
Location

Jiaoliping (Chinese: 交力坪車站; pinyin: Jiāolìpíng Chēzhàn) is a railway station on the Alishan Forest Railway line located in Zhuqi Township, Chiayi County, Taiwan. It is the midpoint of the railway line.

== History ==
The station was opened on 1 October 1912.

== Architecture ==
Located at an elevation of 997 metres above sea level, the station is a small Japanese-style building with grocery stories from earlier age.

== Around the station ==
- Yuntan Waterfall

== See also ==
- List of railway stations in Taiwan
