= Mululiao railway station =

Railway station in Zhuqi, Chiayi County, Taiwan

Mululiao Station 木履寮車站
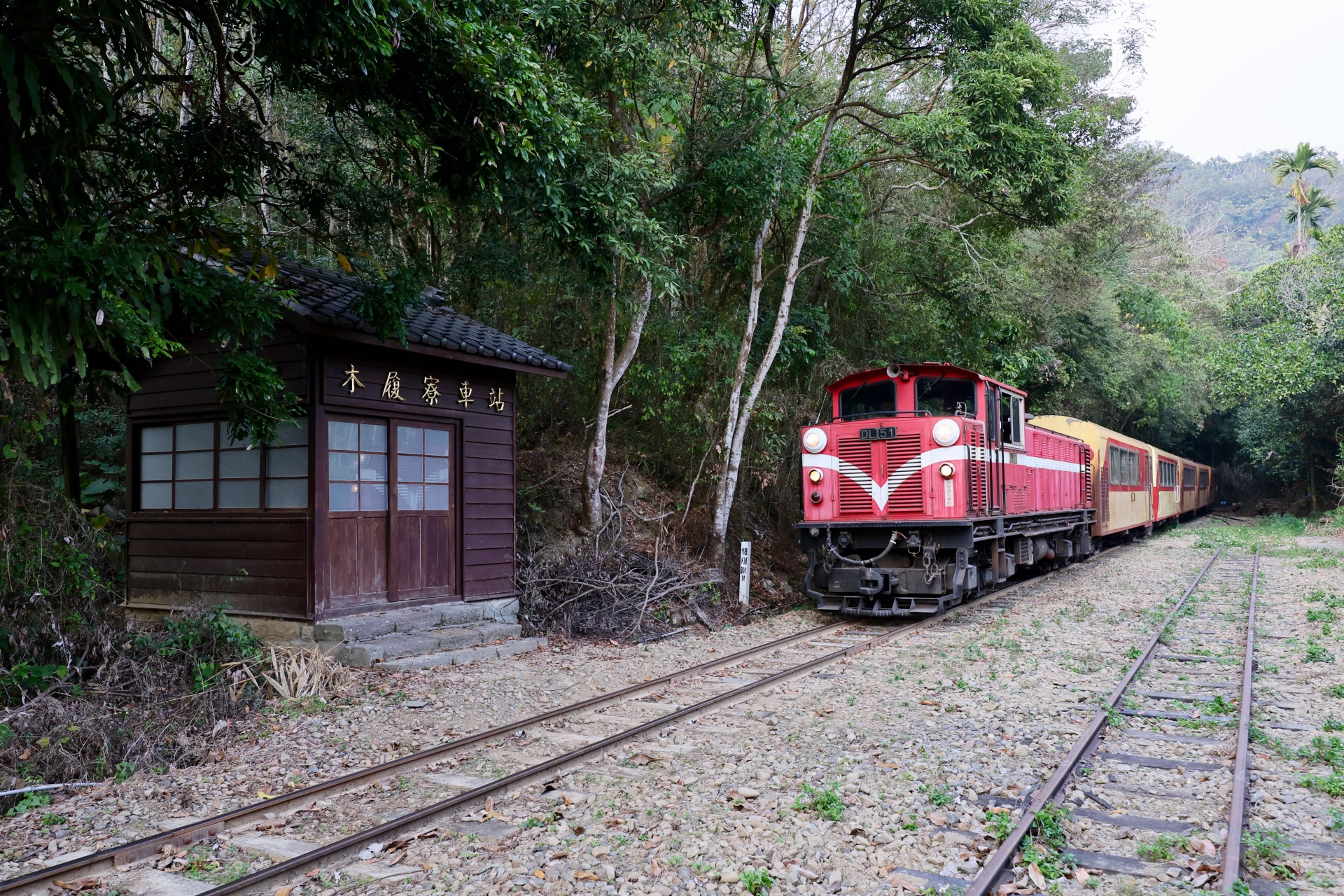

General information
- Location: Zhuqi, Chiayi County, Taiwan
- Coordinates: 23°30′15.8″N 120°39′34.3″E
- Owner: Forestry and Nature Conservation Agency
- Operator: Alishan Forest Railway

History
- Opened: 1 October 1912

Services
Preceding station	Alishan Forest Railway	Following station
Zhangnaoliao towards Alishan	Main line	Zhuqi towards Chiayi
Location

Mululiao (Chinese: 木履寮車站; pinyin: Mùlǚliáo Chēzhàn) is a railway station on the Alishan Forest Railway line located in Zhuqi Township, Chiayi County, Taiwan.

== History ==
The station was opened on 1 October 1912. In 1981, the station was downgraded into an unattended station and the original wooden building was demolished.

== Architecture ==
The station is located at 324 meters above sea level.

== See also ==
- List of railway stations in Taiwan
