= Chushan railway station =

Railway station in Alishan, Chiayi County, Taiwan

Chushan
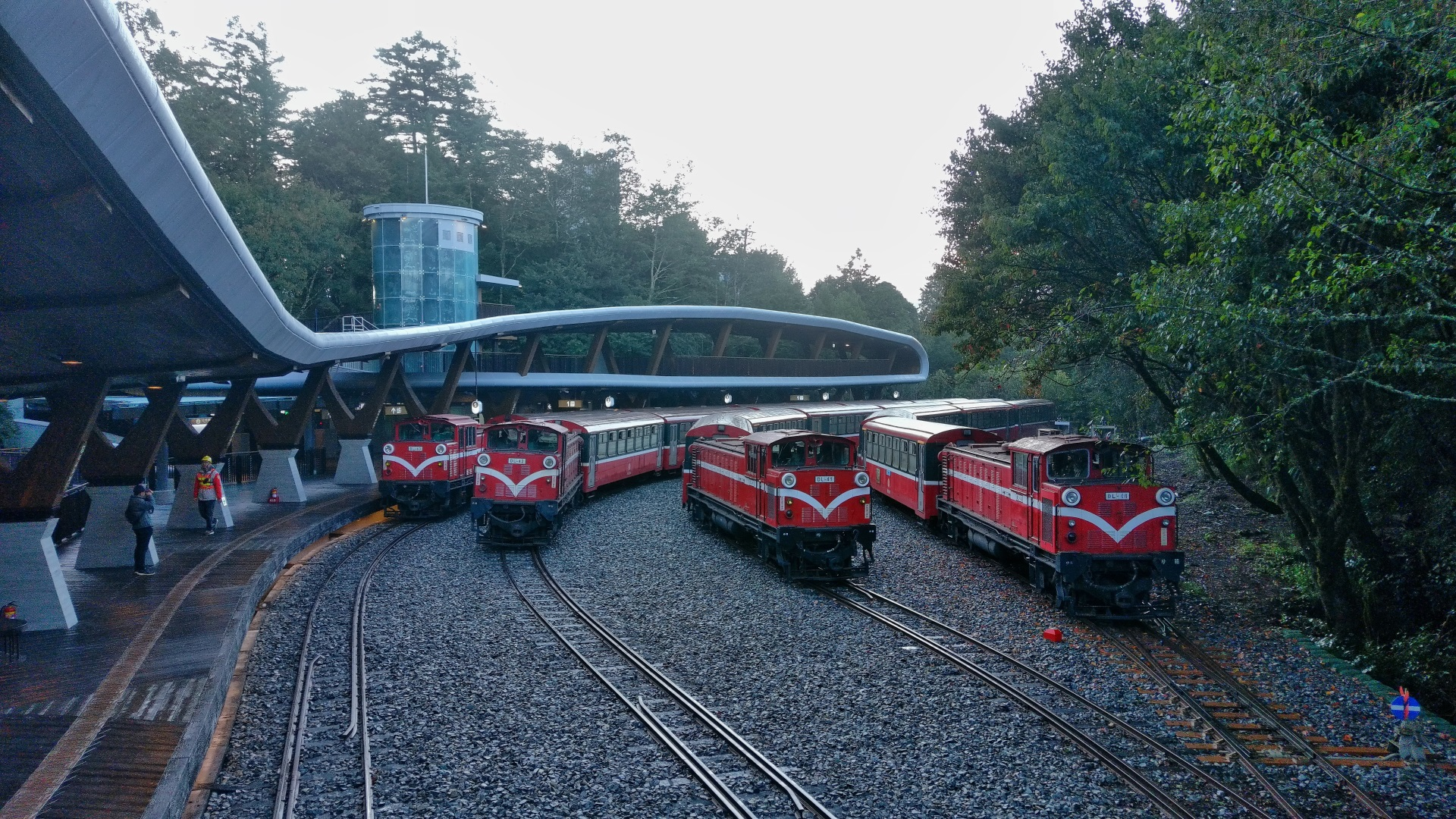

General information
- Location: No. 99, Alishan, Zhongzheng Village, Alishan Township, Chiayi County, 605, Taiwan
- Coordinates: 23°30′36.96″N 120°49′23.07″E
- System: Chushan railway station
- Owner: Alishan Forest Railway
- Operator: Forestry and Nature Conservation Agency
- Line: Chushan
- Platforms: 1
- Tracks: 5
- Train operators: Alishan Forest Railway

History
- Opened: 13 January 1986

Services
Preceding station	Alishan Forest Railway	Following station
Terminus	Chushan line	Zhaoping towards Alishan
Location

Chushan station (Chinese: 祝山; pinyin: Zhùshān; Pe̍h-ōe-jī: Chiok-soaⁿ) is a railway station on the Alishan Forest Railway line located in Alishan Township, Chiayi County, Taiwan.

== History ==
Chushan station was opened on 13 January 1986 as the second station and terminus of a newly constructed 3 kilometers (approx) long branch line off the then Alishan Zhaoping Mianyue line ( which actually ran through to Shishou railway station). The old line from the junction up through Mianyue has been subsequently closed due to damage caused by the 1999 Jiji earthquake, leaving the Chushan service as the only line operating east of Zhaoping railway station. That 3 Kilometer branch from the new junction to Chushan was first Taiwanese built section of mountain railway, all the other lines being built during the period when Japan controlled Taiwan. At an elevation of 2451 meters above sea level, Chushan Station has the highest altitude of any railway station currently operating in Taiwan. The branch line and the two new stations, ( the other station being Duigaoyue railway station ), were constructed to handle increased tourist traffic visiting to watch the sunrise from nearby viewing platforms. This increase in visitors resulted from the improved access provided by the opening of the Alishan Highway 台18線 and 台21線 into the Alishan National Forest Recreation Area. Trains run to Chushan from Alishan railway station via Zhaoping, a journey of 6.25 kilometers.

Chushan station closed for rebuilding on 14 October 2020. The station was modernised and increased in capacity to cope with the increased numbers of visitor reopening in 2023.

== Around the station ==
- Zhushan Observation Platform
- Ogasawara Mountain Observation Deck

== See also ==
- List of railway stations in Taiwan
