= Zhuqi =

Rural township in Chiayi County, Taiwan

Coordinates: 23.506482°N 120.602064°E

Zhuqi Township 竹崎鄉 Tek-kiā-hiong; Takesaki
- Rural township
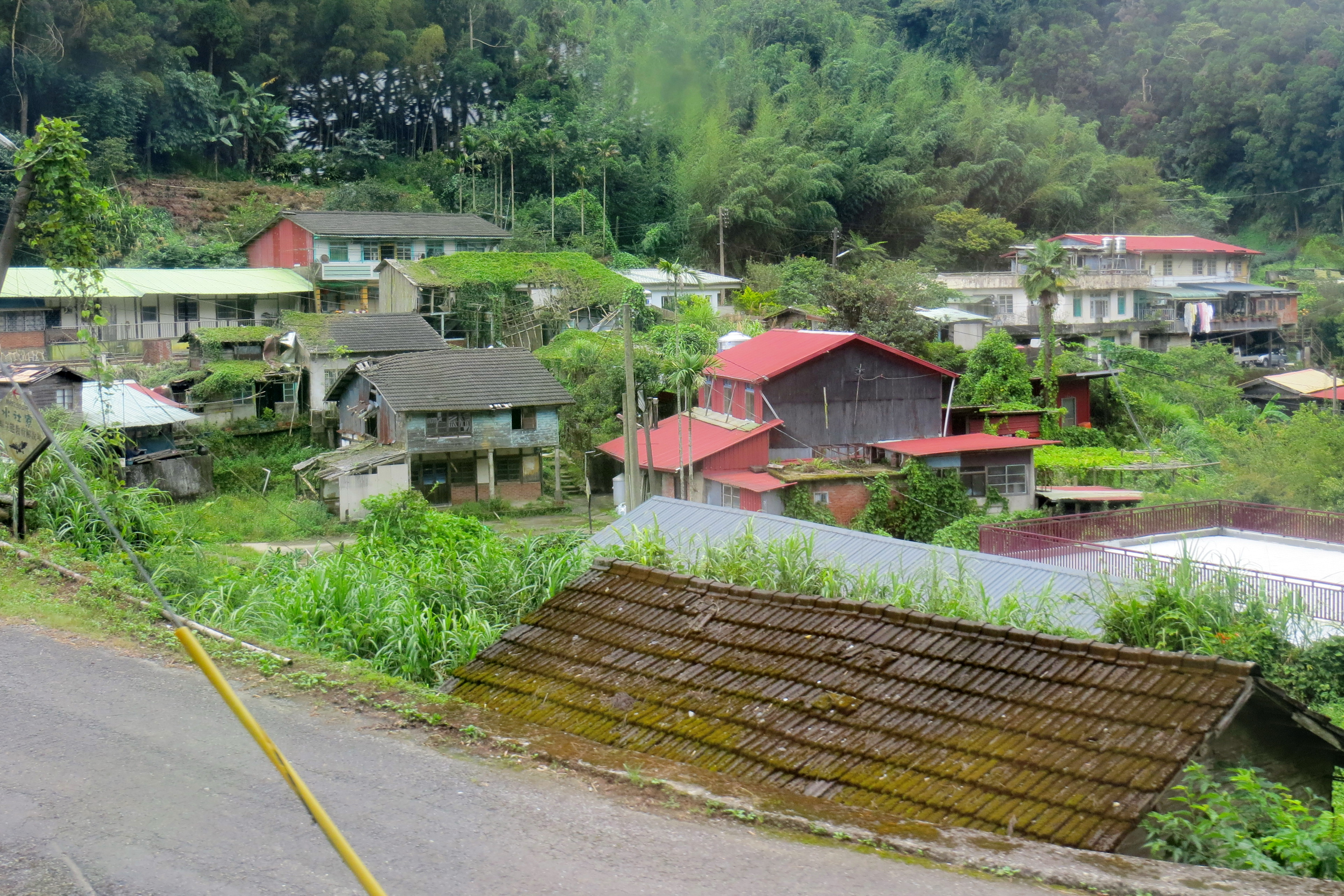

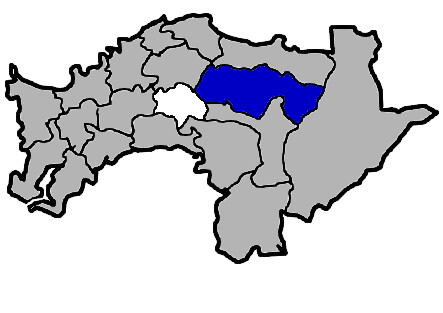
- Zhuqi Township in Chiayi County
- Location: Chiayi County, Taiwan

Area
  - Total: 162 km^{2} (63 sq mi)

Population (May 2022)
  - Total: 33,906
  - Density: 209/km^{2} (542/sq mi)

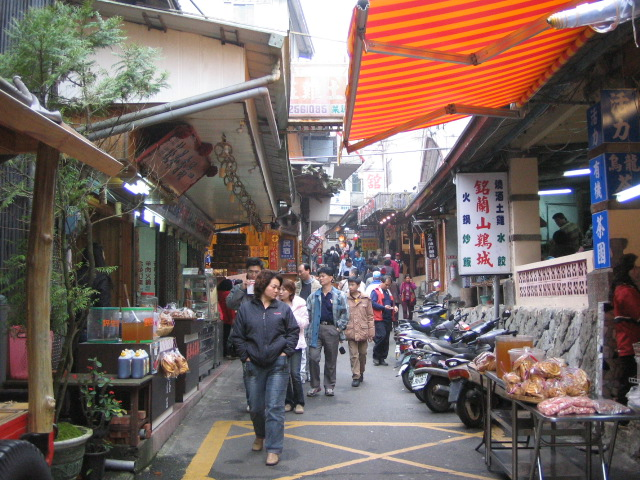
Fenchihu Old Town

Zhuqi Township or Jhuci Township (Chinese: 竹崎鄉; pinyin: Zhúqí Xiāng; Pe̍h-ōe-jī: Tek-kiā-hiong) is a rural township in Chiayi County, Taiwan.

== Geography ==
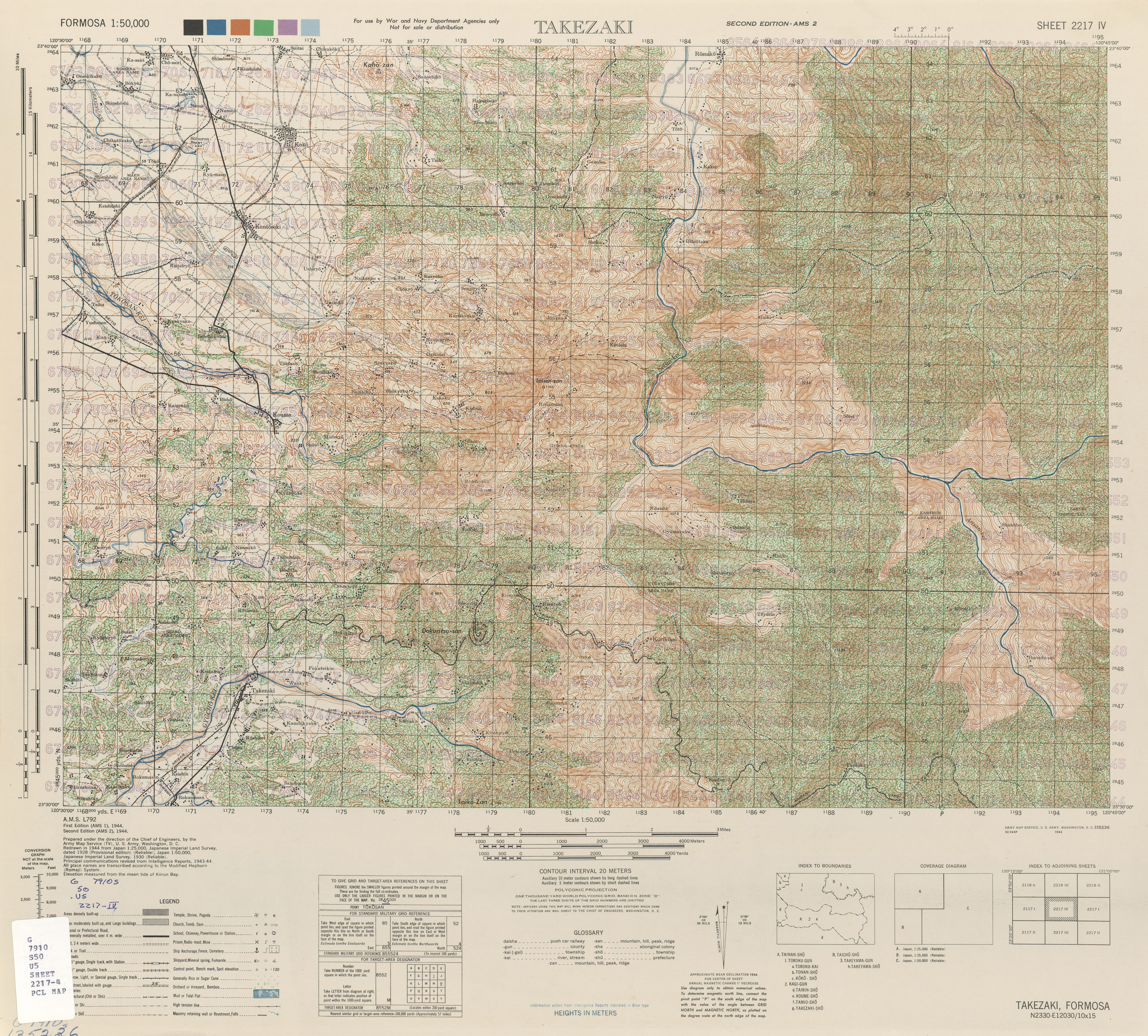
Map including Zhuqi (labeled as Takezaki) (1944)

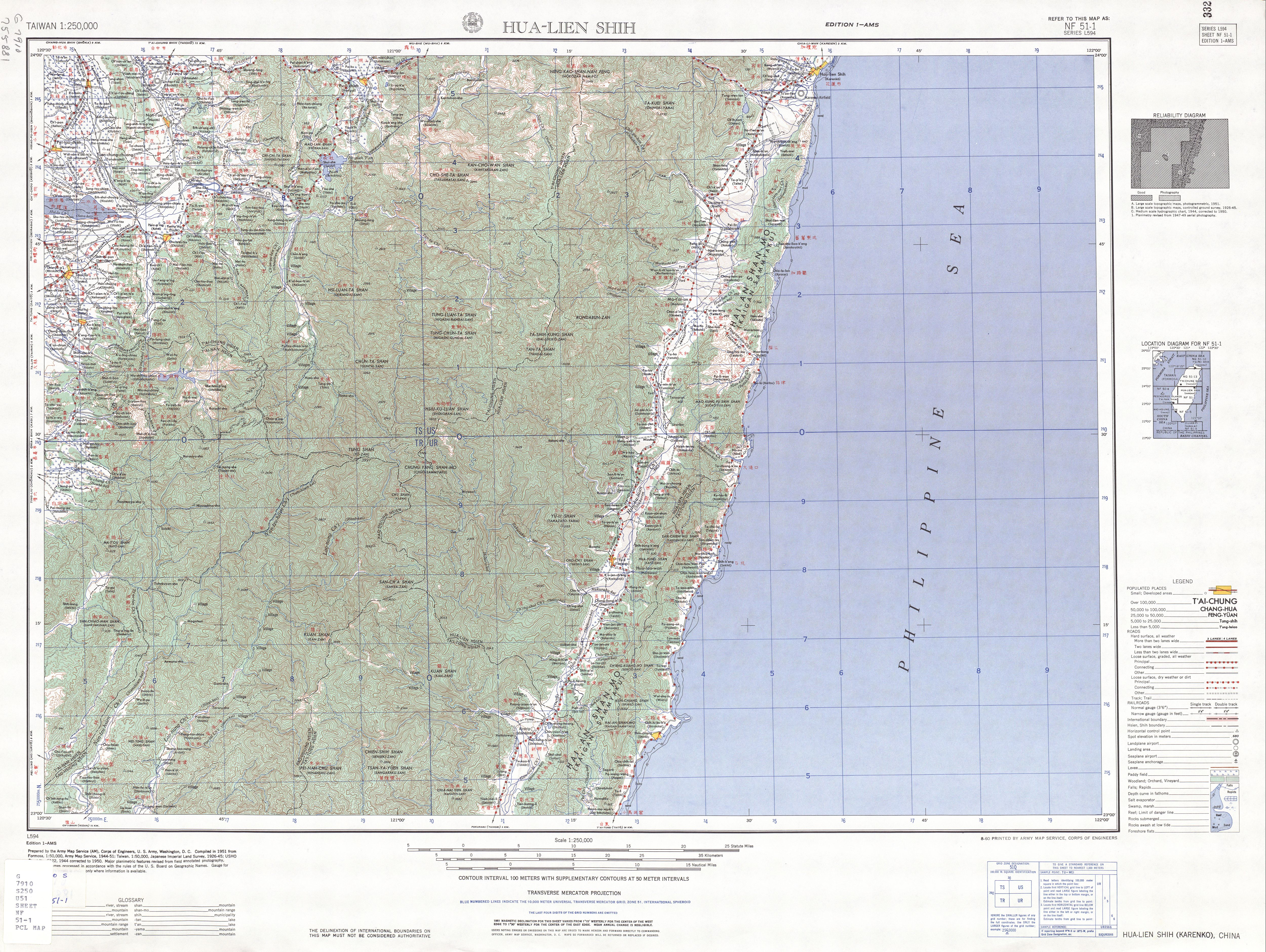
Map including Zhuqi (labeled as Chu-ch'i (Takezaki) 竹崎) (1951)

It has a population of 33,906 as of May 2022, and an area of 162 square kilometres (63 sq mi).

== Administrative divisions ==
The township comprises the villages of Baiqi, Duanru, Fujin, Guanghua, Heping, Jinshi, Kengtou, Longshan, Luman, Neipu, Renshou, Shakeng, Shengping, Shiye, Tangxing, Taoyuan, Wanqiao, Wenfeng, Yihe, Yilong, Yiren, Zhonghe, Zhuqi and Ziyun.

== Tourist attractions ==
- Bamboo Museum
- Dulishan National Trail
- Fenchihu Old Street
- Fencihu Scenic Area
- Guanyin Waterfall Scenic Area
- Hongjing Bridge
- Millennium Suspension Bridge
- Train Museum
- Yuantan River Wildlife Conservation Water Park
- Yuntan Waterfalls
- Zhuqi Park

== Transportation ==
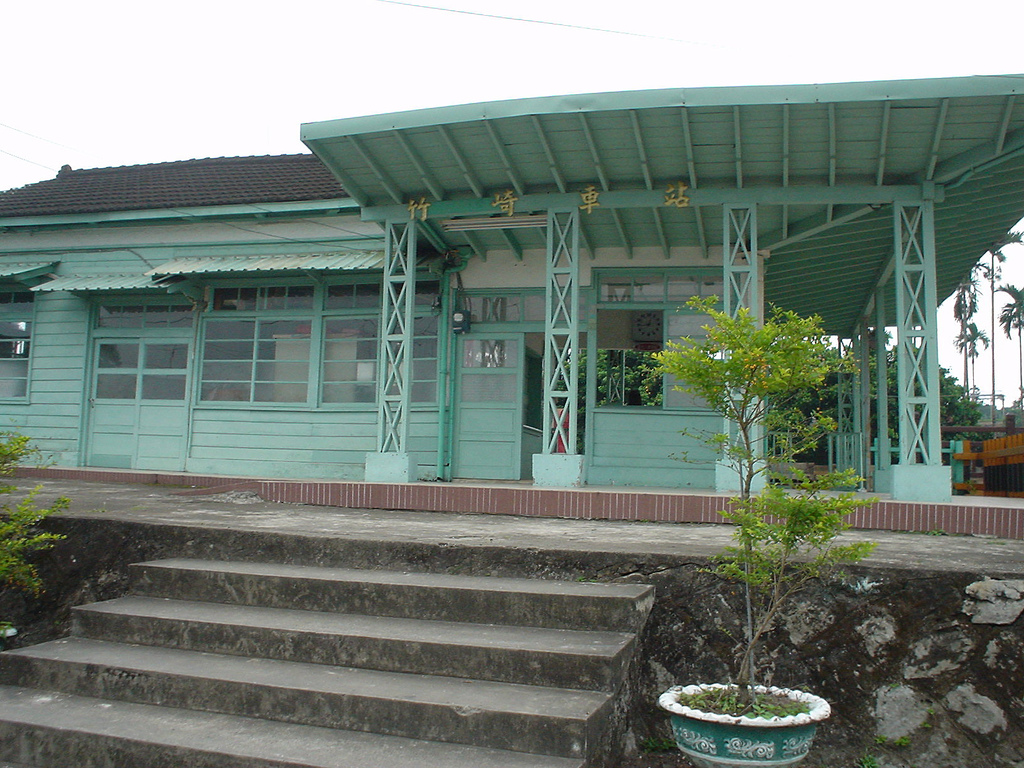
Zhuqi Station

The township is accessible from Lumachan Station, Zhuqi Station, Mululiao Station, Zhangnaoliao Station, Dulishan Station, Jiaoliping Station, Shuisheliao Station and Fenqihu Station of the Alishan Forest Railway.

== Notable natives ==
- Chiu Hsien-chih, Chairperson of New Power Party
