= Shenmu railway station =

Railway station in Alishan, Chiayi County, Taiwan

Shenmu 神木
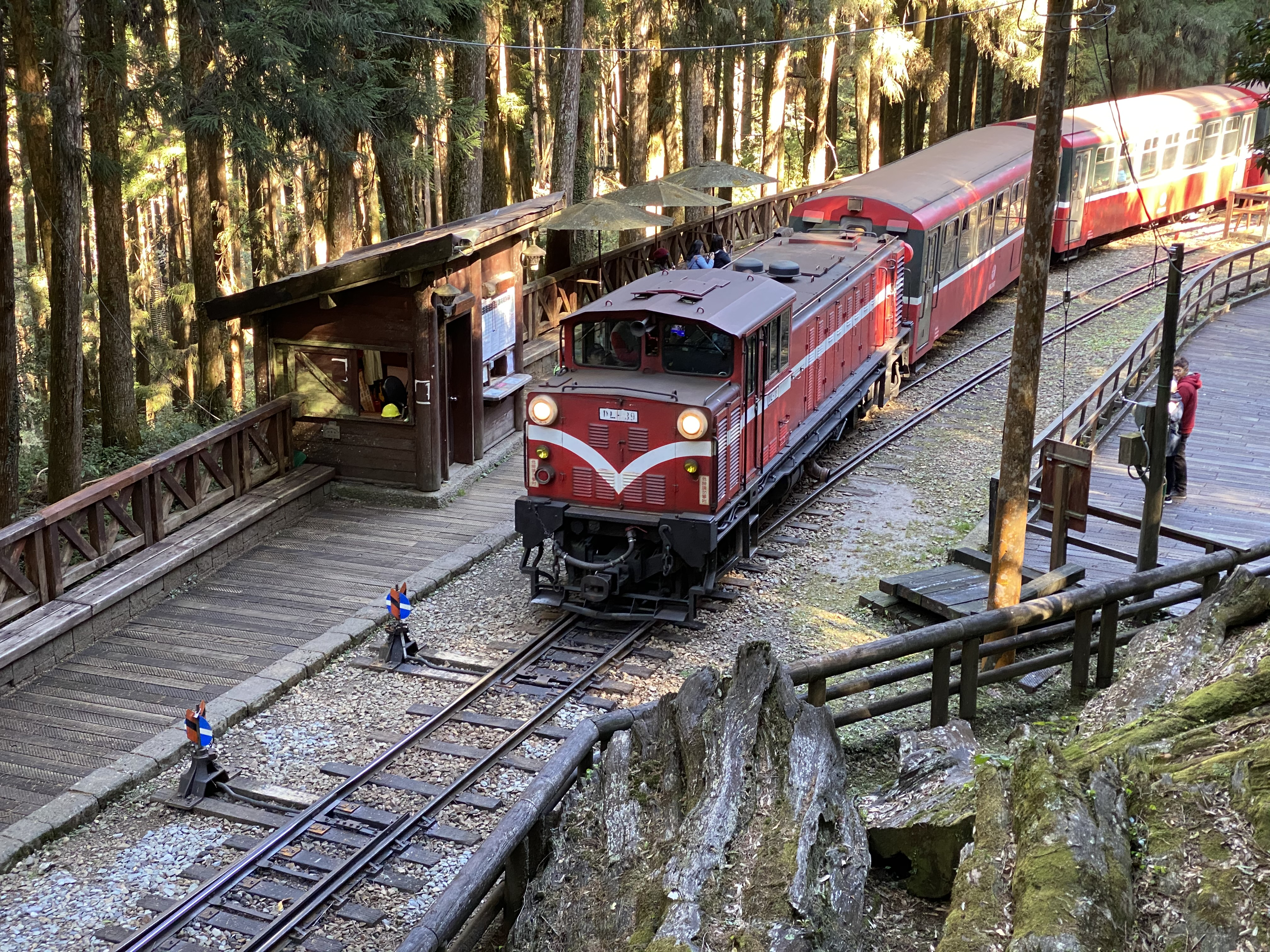

General information
- Location: Alishan, Chiayi County, Taiwan
- Coordinates: 23°31′09.1″N 120°48′24.1″E
- System: Alishan railway station
- Owner: Alishan Forest Railway
- Operator: Forestry and Nature Conservation Agency
- Line: Alishan
- Train operators: Alishan Forest Railway

Other information
- Website: Shenmu (Sacred Tree) Station

History
- Opened: 1914

Services
Preceding station	Alishan Forest Railway	Following station
Alishan Terminus	Shenmu line	Terminus
Alishan Terminus	Main line not serviced for this line	Erwanping towards Chiayi
Location

Shenmu or Sacred Tree station (traditional Chinese: 神木車站; simplified Chinese: 神木车站; pinyin: Shénmù Chēzhàn) is a railway station on the Alishan Forest Railway line located in Alishan Township, Chiayi County, Taiwan.

== Name ==
The station was named after a famous Alishan sacred tree that aged more than 3,000 years locally known as Shenmu. However, the tree was toppled in a storm in 1997.

== History ==
The station was opened in 1914. In April 2011, a train on the Shenmu line derailed killing five passengers and injuring 113 others. The station was then subsequently closed. The station was then reopened on 20 January 2012.

== Nearby stations ==
Erwanping <-- Alishan Forest railway --> Alishan

== See also ==
- List of railway stations in Taiwan
