= Zhaoping railway station =

Railway station in Alishan, Chiayi County, Taiwan

Zhaoping 沼平
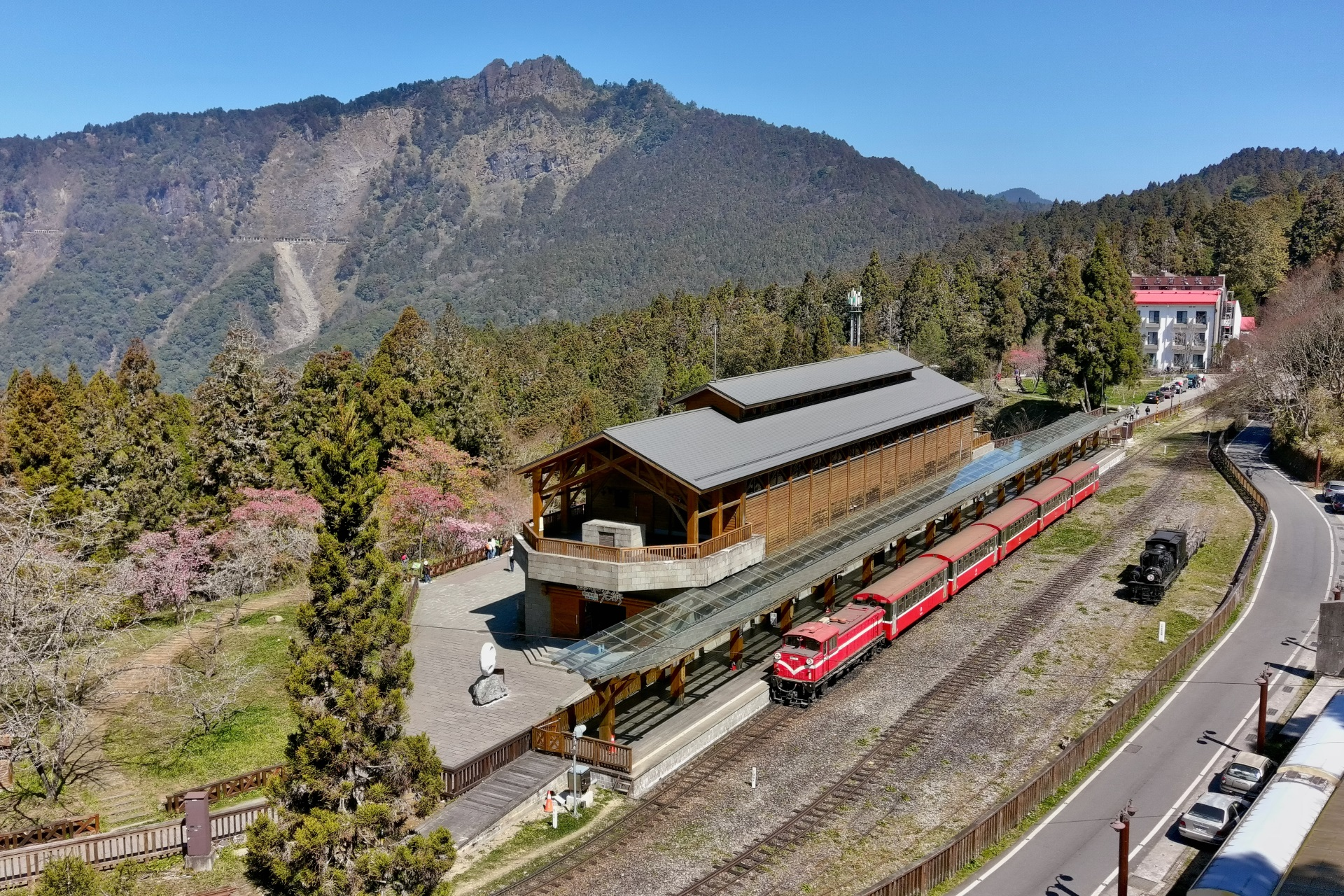

General information
- Location: Alishan, Chiayi County, Taiwan
- Coordinates: 23°30′51.8″N 120°48′49.7″E
- System: Alishan railway station
- Owner: Alishan Forest Railway
- Operator: Forestry and Nature Conservation Agency
- Line: Zhaoping
- Train operators: Alishan Forest Railway

History
- Opened: 14 March 1914

Services
Preceding station	Alishan Forest Railway	Following station
Chushan Terminus	Chushan line	Alishan Terminus
Terminus	Zhaoping line	Alishan Terminus
Location

Zhaoping station (Chinese: 沼平車站; pinyin: Zhǎopíng Chēzhàn) is a railway station on the Alishan Forest Railway line located in Alishan Township, Chiayi County, Taiwan. There is a commemorative stamp at the counter.

== History ==
The station was opened on 14 March 1914. The station was in important hub for the logging industry and the largest log collection center during the Japanese rule. The station was re-inaugurated on 21 April 2013 after refurbishment made by Chiayi Forest District Office.

== Nearby stations ==
Alishan <-- Alishan Forest railway

== Around the station ==
- Alishan Museum
- Zhaoping Park

== See also ==
- List of railway stations in Taiwan
