= Alishan Forest Railway =

Railway in Taiwan

Overview
- Locale: Chiayi County, Taiwan
- Coordinates: 23°30′36″N 120°48′15″E
- Termini: Chiayi; Chushan
- Connecting lines: Chiayi Station: TRA Western Line
- Stations: 22
- Website: Official website

Service
- Operator: Forestry and Nature Conservation Agency
- Daily ridership: 5,500

History
- Opened: 1912

Technical
- Line length: 86 km (53 mi)
- Track gauge: 762 mm (2 ft 6 in)
- Highest elevation: 2,216 m (7,270 ft)

Alishan Forest Railway
- Traditional Chinese: 阿里山森林鐵路
- Simplified Chinese: 阿里山森林铁路
Transcriptions
Standard Mandarin
- Hanyu Pinyin: Ālǐshān Sēnlín Tiělù
- Wade–Giles: A^{1}-li^{3}-shan^{1} Sen^{1}-lin^{2} T'ieh^{3}-lu^{4}
Southern Min
- Hokkien POJ: A-lí-san Sim-lîm Thih-lō·

Alishan Forest Railway (Chinese: 阿里山森林鐵路; pinyin: Ālǐshān Sēnlín Tiělù; Pe̍h-ōe-jī: A-lí-san Sim-lîm Thih-lō͘) is an 86 km network of 2 ft 6 in (762 mm) narrow gauge railways running up to and throughout the popular mountain resort of Alishan in Chiayi County, Taiwan. The railway, originally constructed for logging, has become a tourist attraction with its rare Z-shaped switchbacks, and over 50 tunnels and 77 wooden bridges. Taiwan's Ministry of Culture has listed the forest railway as a potential World Heritage Site.

The railway is managed by the Alishan Forest Railway and Cultural Heritage Office (AFRCHO).

== History ==
=== Japanese era ===
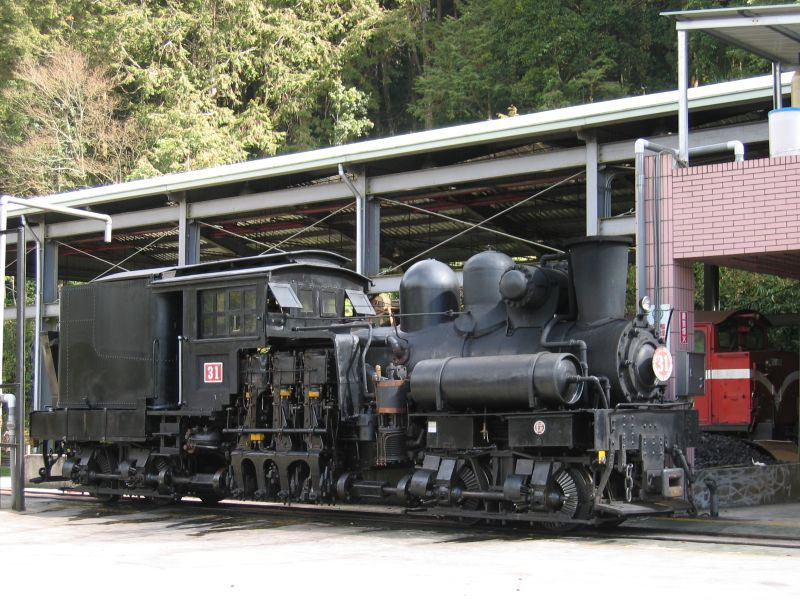
Class B 28t Shay locomotive No.31

The narrow gauge lines were originally constructed by the Japanese Colonial Government to facilitate the logging of cypress and Taiwania wood. Preliminary surveying was conducted in 1900 and route planning began in 1903, but the project was shelved in 1904 due to the Russo-Japanese War. In 1906, the Japanese Government contracted the Osaka-based Fujita-gumi to build the railroad. The company laid tracks from Kagi (Chiayi) to Rienryō (Liyuanliao) and imported 13-ton Shay locomotives to run on the tracks, but financial troubles and technical difficulties in construction in the mountainous terrain forced them to abandon the project in 1908. In 1910, the Japanese Government took interest in the abandoned railroad and decided to finish it themselves, also importing 18-ton Shays for the job. The tracks were extended to Alisan (Zhaoping) in 1913, marking the completion of the main line.

The Alishan Forest Railway became a major tourist railway when the tracks were extended to Niitakaguchi (新高口) in 1933. The station was located very close to Mount Niitaka (now Yu Shan), the highest mountain in Taiwan and the Japanese Empire, and the hike to the summit could be completed in seven to eleven hours, depending on the health of the individual. To cater to hikers, the railway operated an express service from Kagi to Niitakaguchi that only stopped at Shōhei; hikers would stay overnight at a lodge at Niitakaguchi and summit the next day.

=== Since 1945 ===
Diesel railcars supplemented the steam engines on the passenger services. In the 1980s, 10 Hitachi-built diesel-hydraulic locomotives were delivered and replaced the railcars and remaining steam engines.

The completion of the Alishan Highway in 1982 led to the loss of many rail passengers to faster and cheaper buses, and the rail became primarily a tourist attraction.

Accidents on the line have resulted in a number of fatalities over the years. On 24 April 1981, a collapsed tunnel resulted in nine deaths and 13 injuries. On 1 March 2003, 17 people were killed and 156 injured when a train derailed near Alishan Railway Station. On 27 April 2011, five tourists, including three from mainland China, were killed and 113 people injured in a derailment.

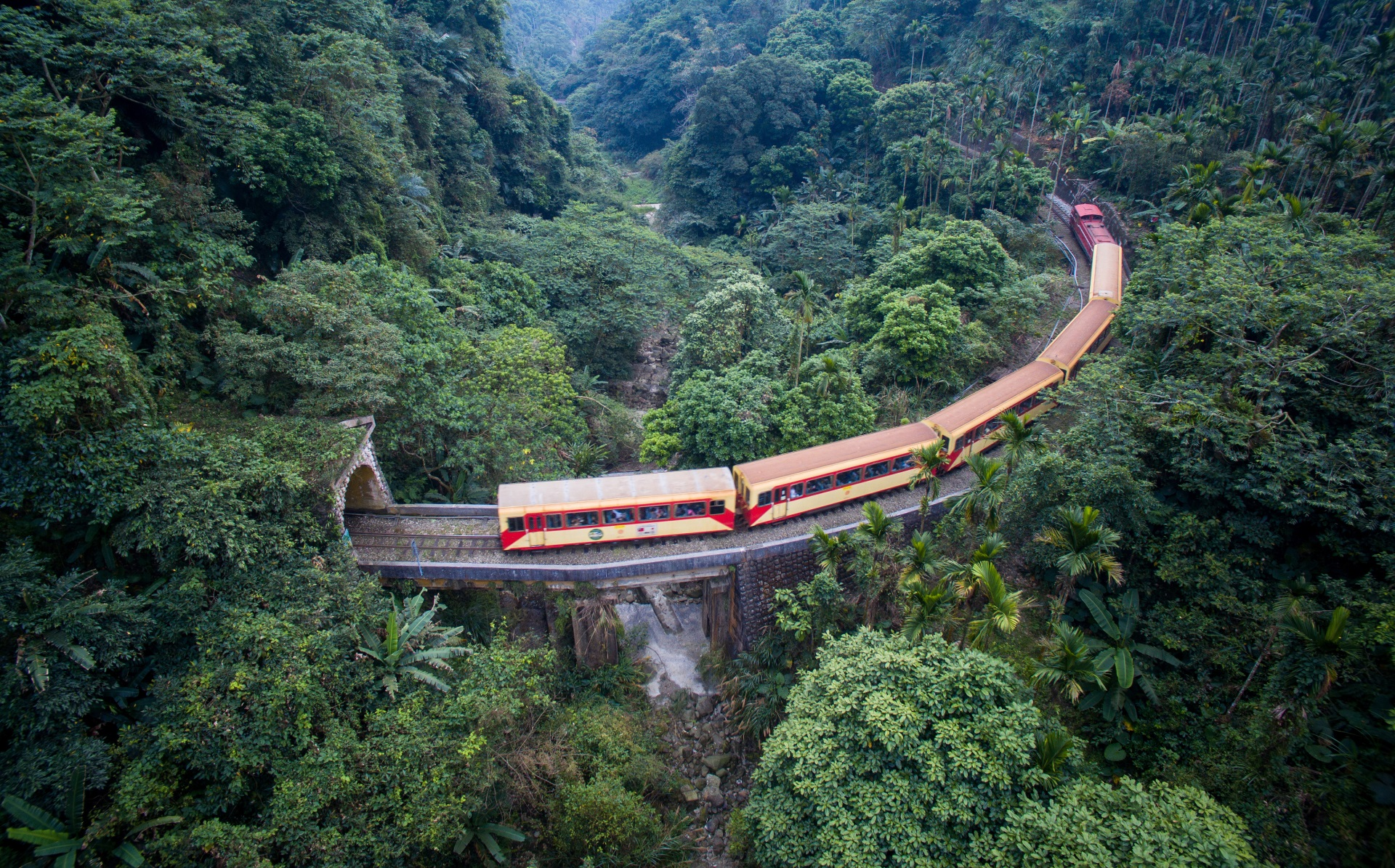
A train near Pingzhena station, on the main line, circa 2023

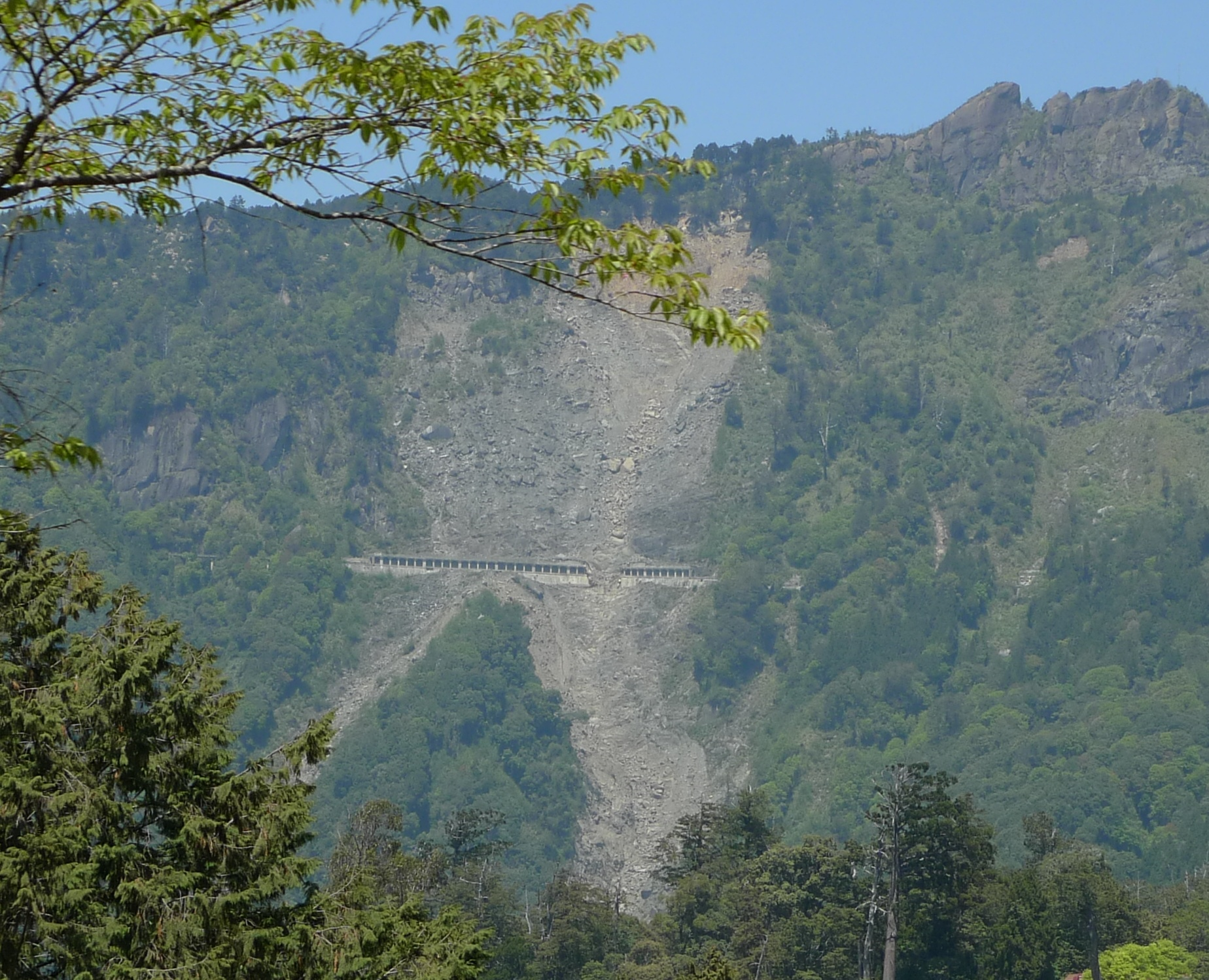
A damaged portion of the Alishan line visible from Alishan National Scenic Area

In addition, services have been repeatedly disrupted due to damage from landslides. The main line from Chiayi to Alishan was partially closed in 2009 due to damage caused by landslides during Typhoon Morakot in 2009 and Typhoon Dujuan in 2015. It reopened between Chiayi and Fenqihu (approximately the halfway point) following typhoon damage repairs in January 2014, and to Shizilu in 2017. The full remaining main line between Chiayi and Zhushan reopened in July 2024, after the completion of Tunnel 42 in April 2024. In August 2015, the Chiayi–Fenqihu section was briefly closed due to damage during Typhoon Soudelor.

In order to further boost tourism in the region, on 5 December 2018 the Alishan Forest Railway commenced a "sister railway" partnership with Čierny Hron Railway in Slovakia; the Alishan Forest Railway has since partnered with ten other companies across six different countries.

== Operation ==
The railway was privatized through a build-operate-transfer (BOT) in June 2008 and maintained by the Hungtu Alishan International Development Corporation. On 1 May 2013, the management of the railway was taken over by Taiwan Railways Administration. On 1 July 2018, the railway was taken over by the newly established Alishan Forest Railway and Cultural Heritage Office of the Forestry Bureau.

The system is currently operated using diesel locomotives, although there are occasional special public runs using the old steam powered Shay locomotives.

== Lines ==
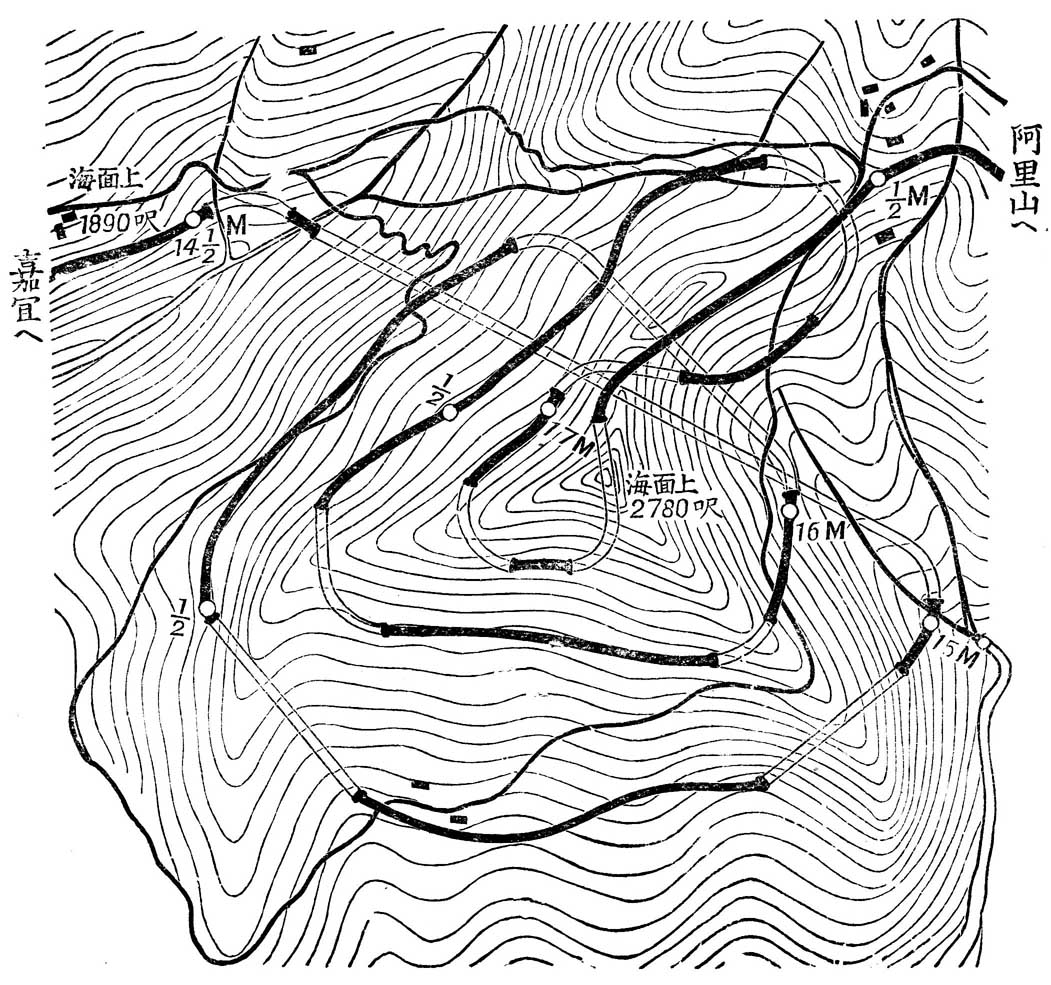
Spiral loop in the Alishan line at Dulishan

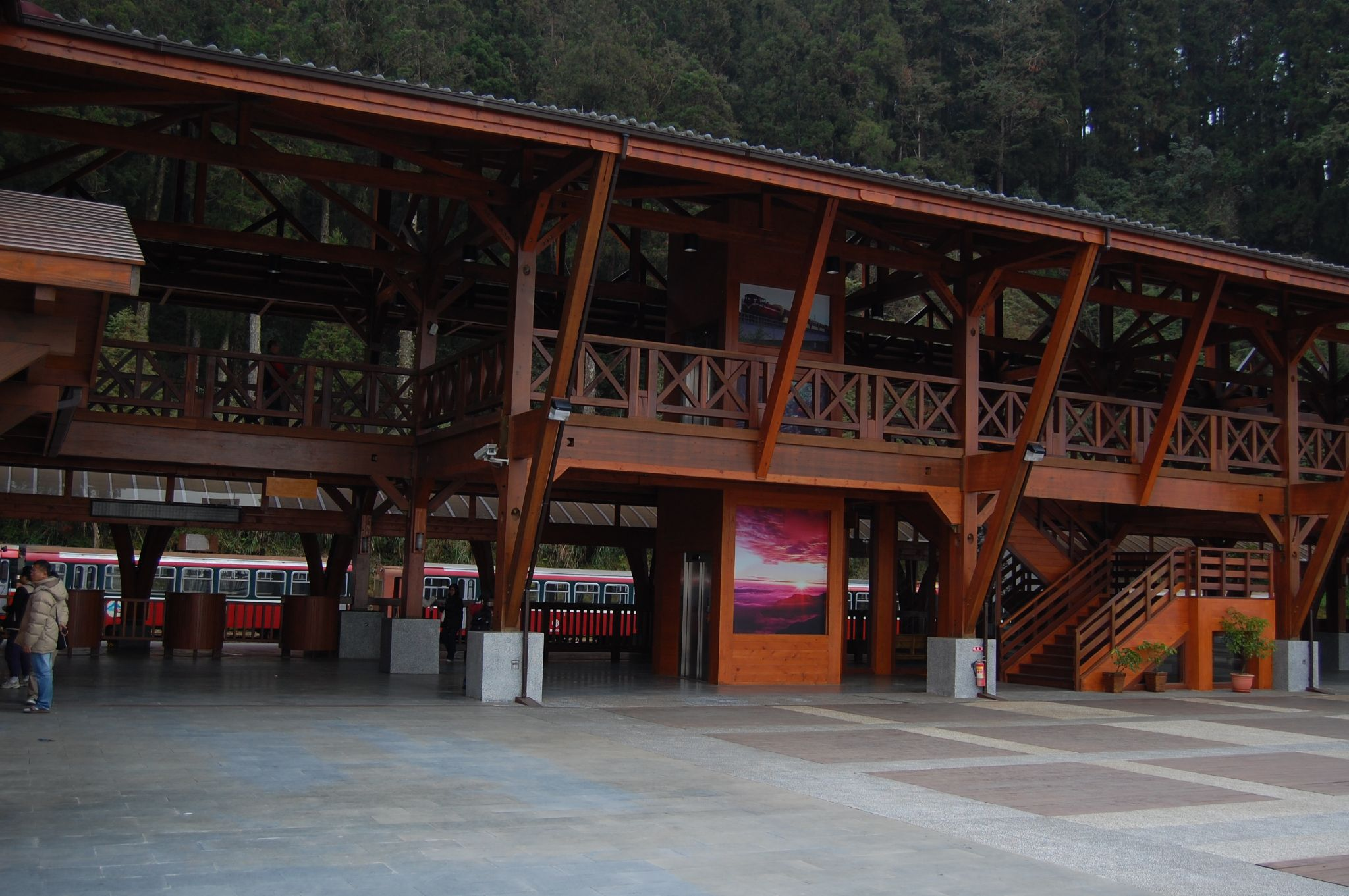
Alishan station

The main line runs from the city of Chiayi (elevation 30 m) to Alishan (elevation 2,216 m). The vegetation along the way changes from tropical to temperate and finally alpine. The line features many switchbacks on the way up the mountain.

- Main line

Chiayi–Alishan
Includes several steep gradients (max. 6.26%), a spiral and four switchbacks, known as the Dulishan Spiral. The longest line with most dramatic climate change.

- Shenmu line

Alishan–Shenmu
Runs frequently all day, a short (5-minute) ride downhill to Shenmu station.

- Chushan line

Alishan–Chushan
Early morning trains, popular for viewing the sunrise over Jade Mountain

- Zhaoping line

Alishan–Zhaoping
Runs frequently all day, a short (5-minute) ride uphill to Zhaoping station

- Mianyue line

Alishan–Shihou
Closed due to earthquake damage and typhoon, currently turned to mountain trail, first stage reconstruction to Tashan.

- Shuishan line

Alishan–Shuishan
No passenger service, mountain trail and thinning only

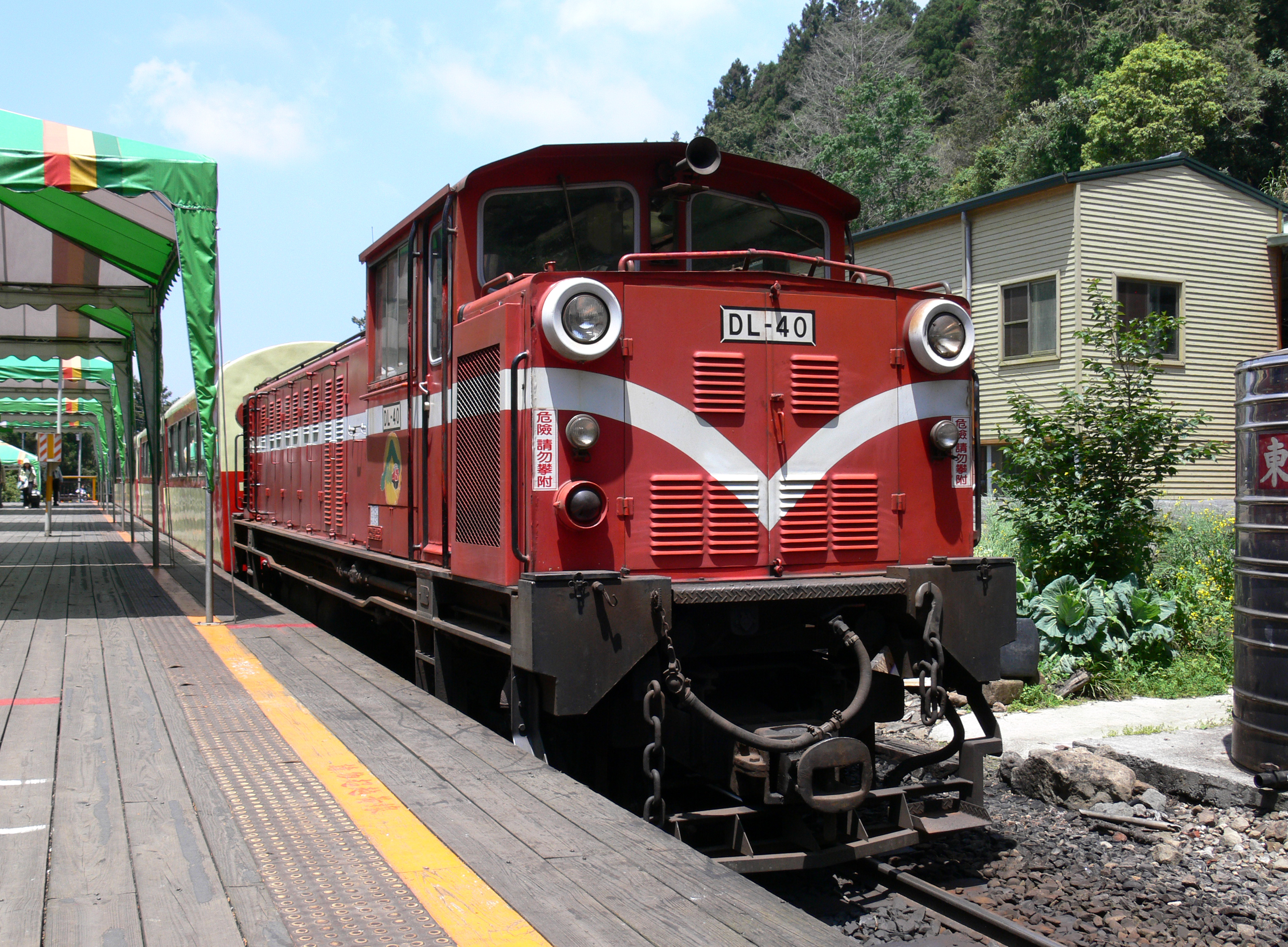
The front of the train on the Zhushan line

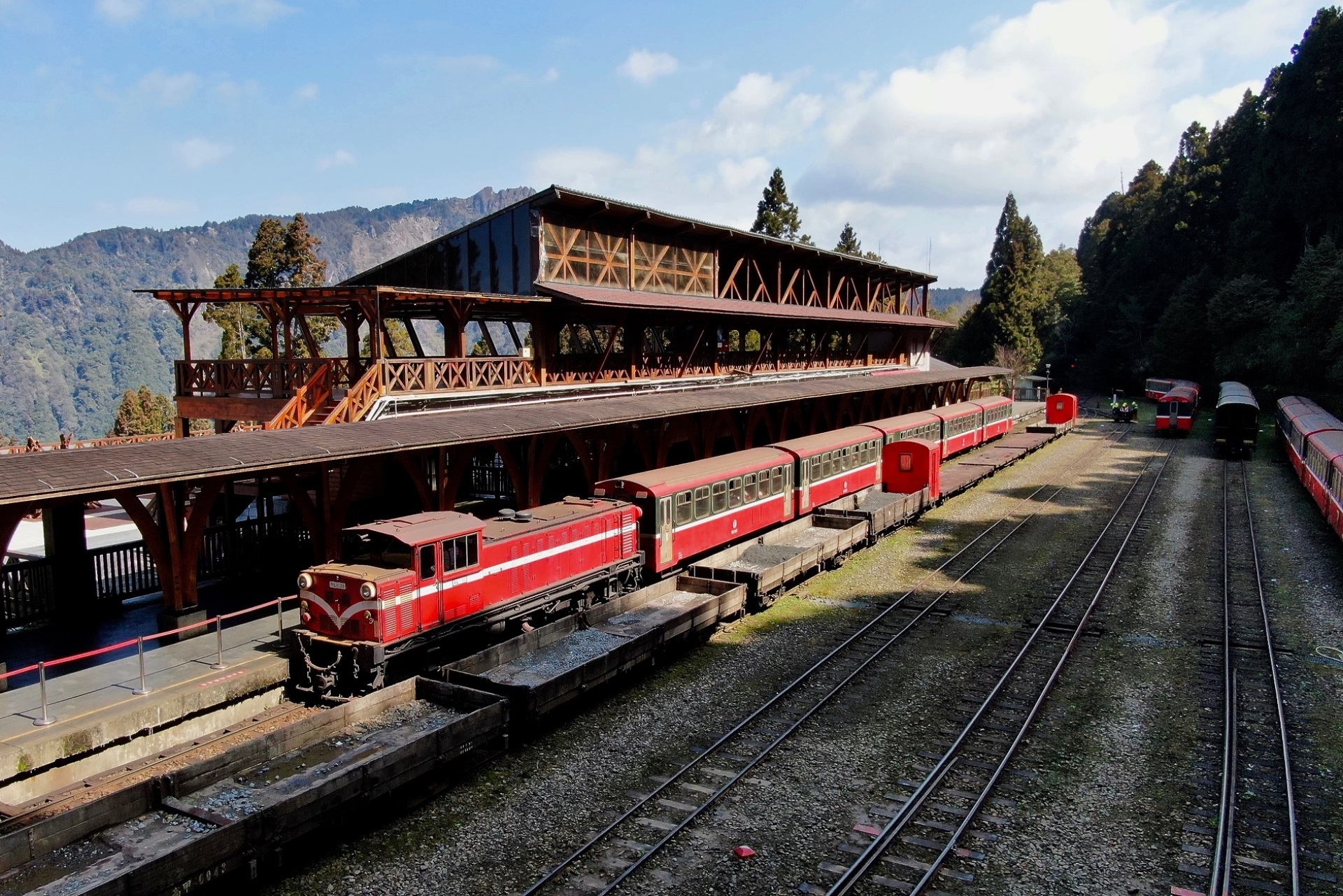
Alishan station

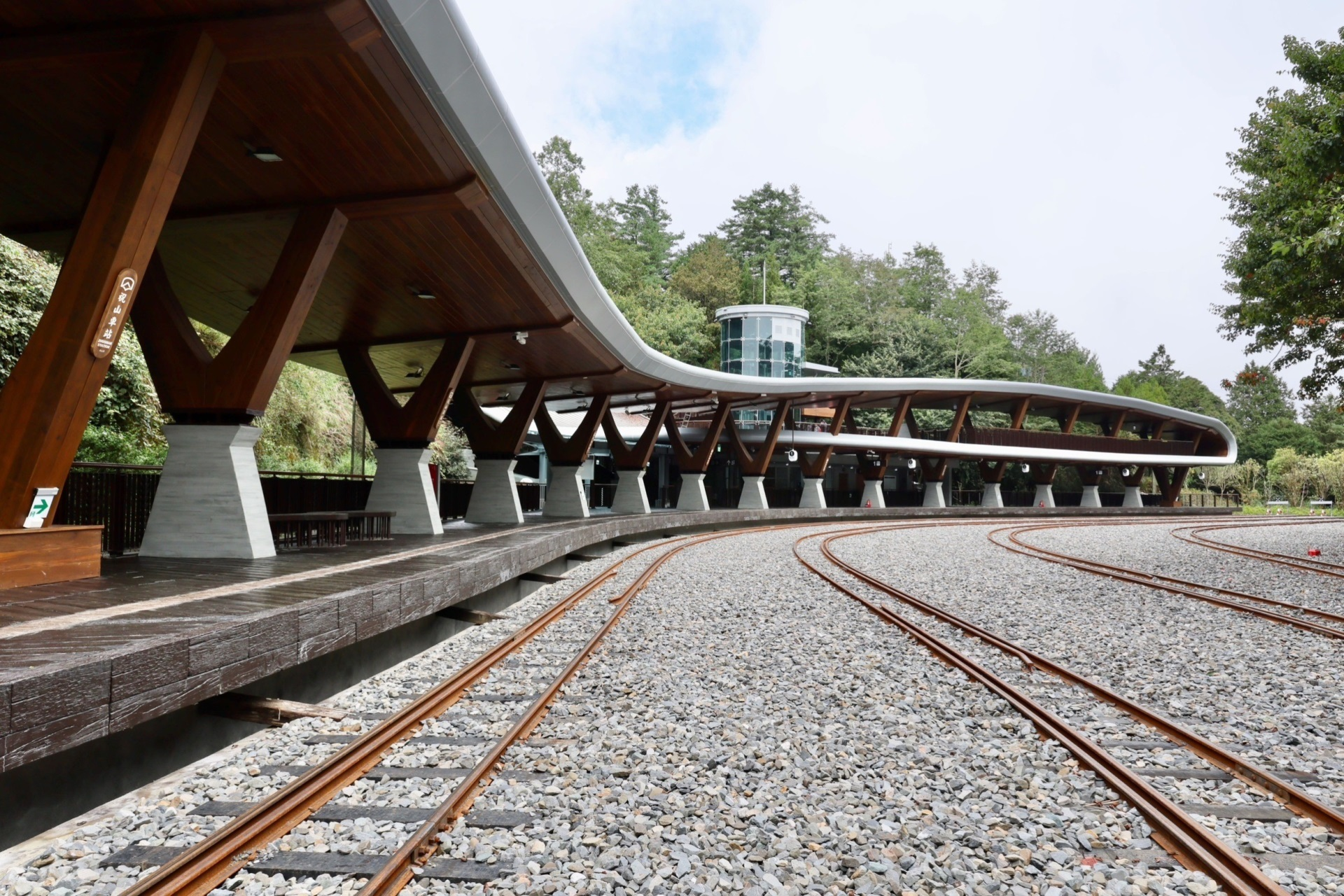
Zhushan station

== List of stations ==
=== Alishan line (Main line) ===
Name	Chinese	Taiwanese	Hakka	Tsou	Elevation (m)	Distance (km)	Transfers and notes	Location	
Chiayi	嘉義	Ka-gī	Kâ-ngi		30	0.0	West Coast line: Chiayi; Terminus for all trains	West	Chiayi
Beimen	北門	Pak-mn̂g	Pet-mùn		31	1.6		East	Chiayi
Lumachan	鹿麻產	Lo̍k-môa-sán	Lu̍k-mà-sán		82	10.8		Zhuqi	Chiayi; County
Zhuqi	竹崎	Tek-kiā	Chuk-khì		127	14.2		Zhuqi	Chiayi; County
Mulüliao	木履寮	Ba̍k-kia̍h-liàu	Muk-kiak-liàu		324	18.9	No passenger service	Zhuqi	Chiayi; County
Zhangnaoliao	樟腦寮	Chiuⁿ-ló͘-liâu	Chông-nó-liàu		543	23.3	Train No.5 and No.8 non-stop	Zhuqi	Chiayi; County
Dulishan	獨立山	To̍k-li̍p-soaⁿ	Thu̍k-li̍p-sân		743	27.4	Train No.5 and No.8 non-stop	Zhuqi	Chiayi; County
Liyuanliao	梨園寮	Lê-hn̂g-liâu	Lài-yèn-liàu		905	31.4	Train No.5 and No.8 non-stop	Meishan	Chiayi; County
Jiaoliping	交力坪	Ka-le̍k-pêⁿ	Kâu-li̍t-phiàng		997	34.9		Zhuqi	Chiayi; County
Shuisheliao	水社寮	Chúi-siā-liâu	Súi-sa-liàu		1,186	40.5	Train No.5 and No.8 non-stop	Zhuqi	Chiayi; County
Fenqihu	奮起湖	Pùn-ki-ô͘	Fun-hí-fù		1,403	45.8	Train No.5 will stop for an hour Terminus for Train No.311 and No.312	Zhuqi	Chiayi; County
Duolin	多林	To-lîm	Tô-lìm	Ngungutu	1,516	50.9	Train No.5 and No.8 non-stop	Alishan	Chiayi; County
Shizilu	十字路	Si̍p-jī-lō͘	Sṳ̍p-sṳ-lu	Sʉa’fʉnʉ	1,534	55.3	Terminus for Train No.1 and No.2; Train No.5 and No.8 non-stop	Alishan	Chiayi; County
Pingzhena	屏遮那	Hè-sen-ná	Phìn-châ-nâ	Hashianna	1,711	60.5	No passenger service	Alishan	Chiayi; County
First Switch	第一分道	Tē-it-pun-tō	Thi-yit-fûn-tho		1,827	63.0	No passenger service	Alishan	Chiayi; County
Erwanping	二萬坪	Jī-bān-pêⁿ	Ngi-van-phìn	Hehesiana	2,000	66.8	stop for Train No.5 and No.8	Alishan	Chiayi; County
Shenmu	神木	Sîn-bo̍k	Sṳ̀n-muk	Ak’e fahei	2,138	69.6	→ Shenmu line Formerly Third Switch; Train No.5 and No.8 non-stop	Alishan	Chiayi; County
Alishan	阿里山	A-lí-san	Â-lî-sân	Psoseongana	2,216	71.4	Terminus for Train No.5 and No.8; Formerly Fourth Switch	Alishan	Chiayi; County
Zhaoping	沼平	Chau-pêng	Cheu-phiàng	Chuchumuana	2,274	72.7	→ Mianyue line → Chushan line Formerly Alishan station	Alishan	Chiayi; County

=== Chushan line ===
Name	Chinese	Taiwanese	Hakka	Tsou	Elevation (m)	Distance (km)	Transfers and notes	Location	
Alishan	阿里山	A-lí-san	Â-lî-sân	Psoseongana	2,216	0		Alishan	Chiayi; County
Zhaoping	沼平	Chau-pêng	Cheu-phiàng	Chuchumuana	2,274	1.3	→ Alishan line → Mianyue line	Alishan	Chiayi; County
Shizifendao	十字分道	Si̍p-jī-pun-tō	Sṳ̍p-sṳ-fûn-tho		2,310	2.9		Alishan	Chiayi; County
Duigaoyue	對高岳	Tuì-ko-ga̍k	Tui-kô-ngo̍k	P’oocva	2,350	4.9		Xinyi	Nantou; County
Chushan	祝山	Chiok-soaⁿ	Chuk-sân	Yuafeofeo	2,451	6.25	Highest railway station in Taiwan	Xinyi	Nantou; County

=== Mianyue line ===
Name	Chinese	Taiwanese	Hakka	Elevation (m)	Distance (km)	Transfers and notes	Location	
Alishan	阿里山	A-lí-san	Â-lî-sân	2,216	0		Alishan	Chiayi; County
Zhaoping	沼平	Chau-pêng	Cheu-phiàng	2,274	1.3	→ Alishan line → Zhushan line	Alishan	Chiayi; County
Shizifendao	十字分道	Si̍p-jī-pun-tō	Sṳ̍p-sṳ-fûn-tho	2,310	2.9		Alishan	Chiayi; County
Tashan	塔山	Thah-san	Thap-sân	2,344	5.5	Was the highest railway station in the Empire of Japan	Alishan	Chiayi; County
Mianyue	眠月	Biân-goa̍t	Mìn-ngie̍t	2,303	8.0	Located in the Taiwan pleione Natural reserve	Alishan	Chiayi; County
Shihou	石猴	Chio̍h-kâu	Sa̍k-hèu	2,318	9.26	The Stone Monkey was destroyed in the 921 earthquake in 1999.	Alishan	Chiayi; County

== Sister railways ==
- (Japan) Ōigawa Railway
- (Japan) Kurobe Gorge Railway
- (India) Kalka–Shimla Railway
- (India) Darjeeling Himalayan Railway
- (India) Nilgiri Mountain Railway
- (Switzerland) Matterhorn Gotthard Bahn
- (Switzerland) Gornergrat Railway
- (Switzerland) Rhaetian Railway
- (United Kingdom) Welshpool and Llanfair Light Railway
- (Slovakia) Čierny Hron Railway
- (Australia) Zig Zag Railway

== Tribute ==
On 10 March 2018, Google celebrated the Alishan Forest Railway with a Google Doodle.

== See also ==
- Rail transport in Taiwan
- Alishan National Scenic Area
