= Alishan railway station =

Railway station in Alishan, Chiayi County, Taiwan

Alishan Station 阿里山
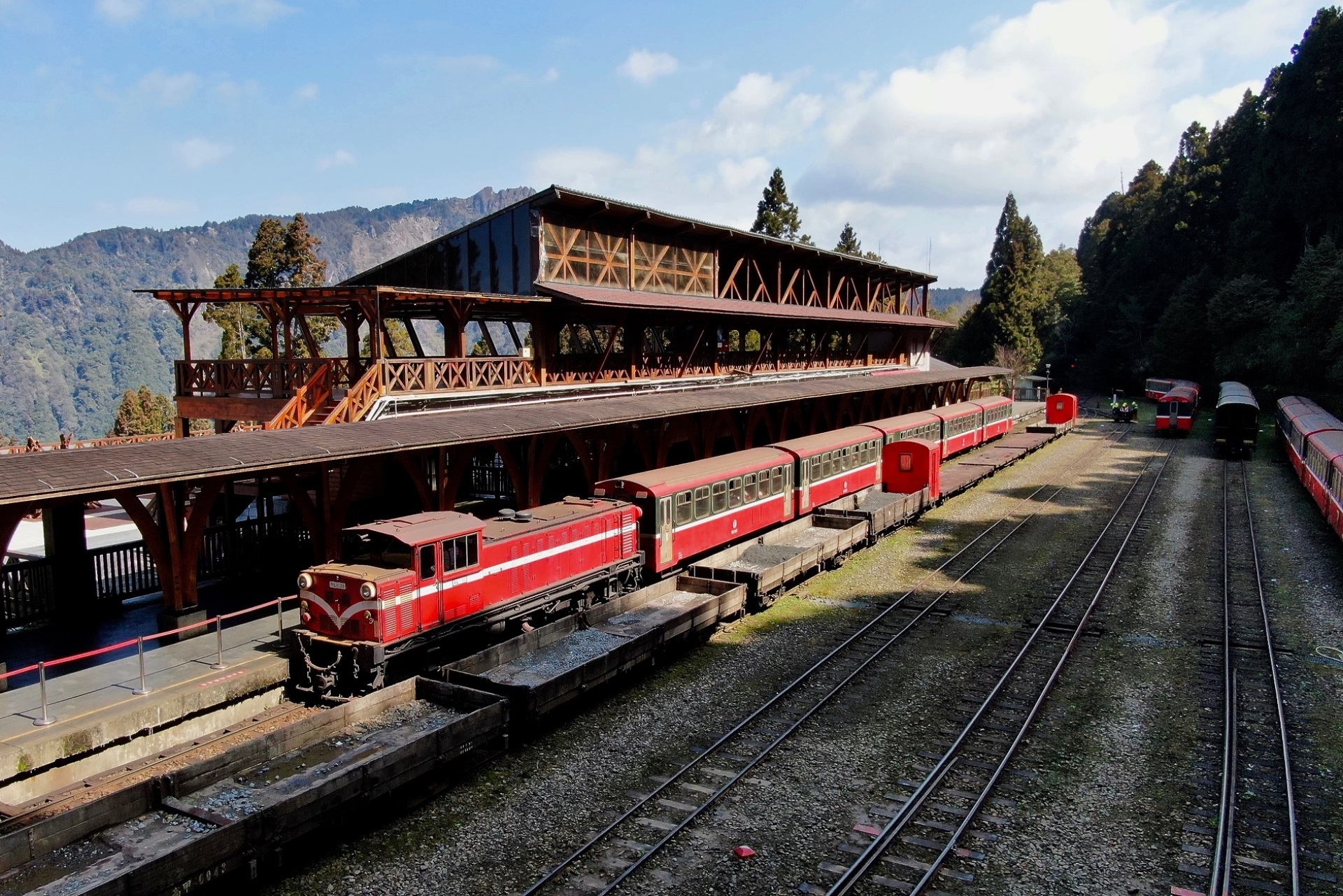

General information
- Location: Alishan, Chiayi County, Taiwan
- Coordinates: 23°30′36.7″N 120°48′16.3″E
- System: Train station
- Owner: Alishan Forest Railway
- Operator: Forestry and Nature Conservation Agency
- Lines: Chushan, Shenmu, Zhaoping
- Train operators: Alishan Forest Railway

History
- Opened: 11 January 1981

Services
Preceding station	Alishan Forest Railway	Following station
Terminus	Main line	Shenmu towards Chiayi
Terminus	Shenmu line	Shenmu Terminus
Zhaoping towards Chushan	Chushan line	Terminus
Zhaoping Terminus	Zhaoping line	Terminus
Location

Alishan station (traditional Chinese: 阿里山車站; simplified Chinese: 阿里山车站; pinyin: Ālǐshān Chēzhàn) is a railway station on the Alishan Forest Railway line located in Alishan township, Chiayi County, Taiwan. There is a commemorative stamp at the service counter.

== History ==
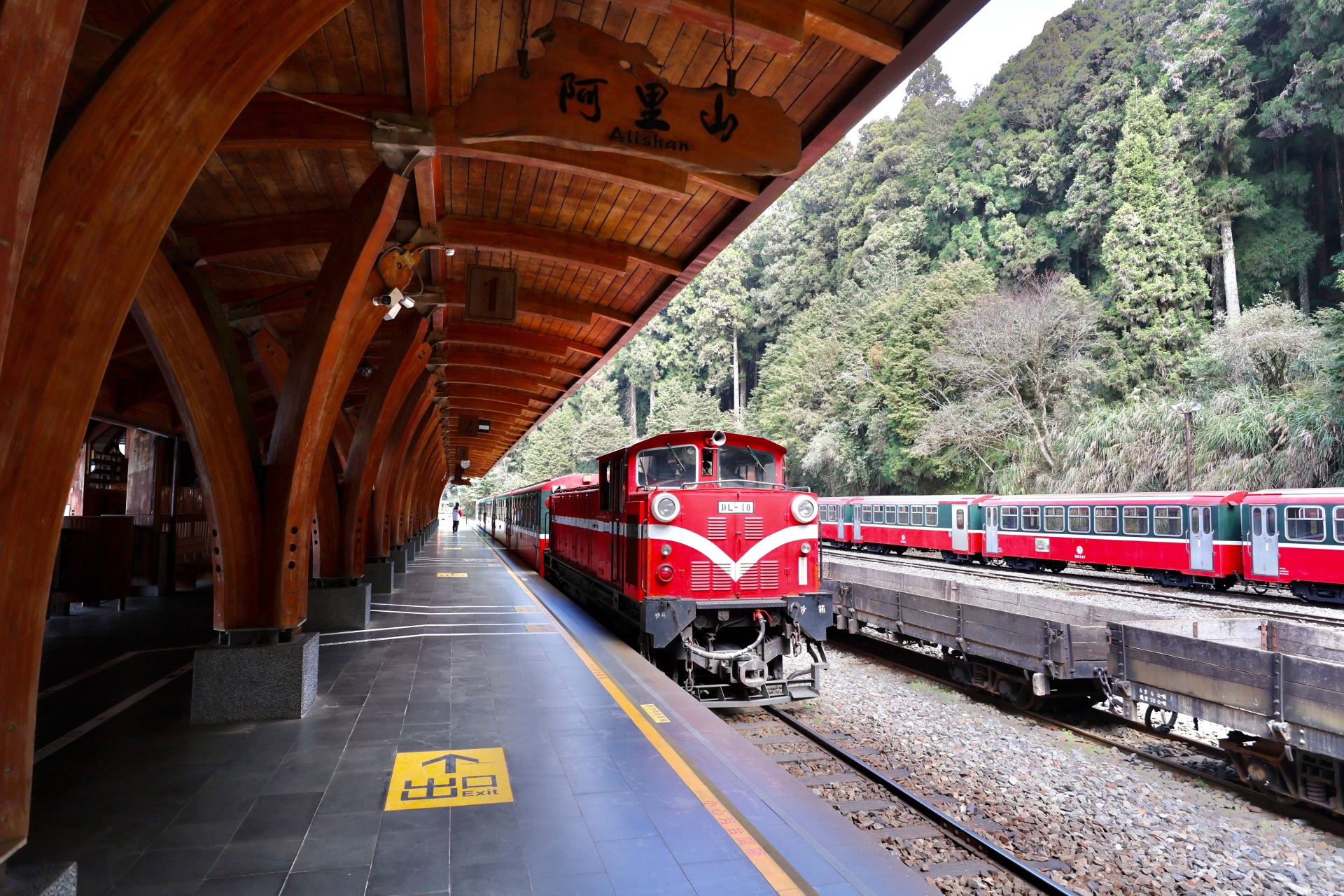
Alishan station platform

The station was opened on 11 January 1981.

The station was badly damaged by the 921 earthquake on 21 September 1999. It was rebuilt on the same spot and reopened in 2007.

== Architecture ==
The station building is made of wood with a line of arched wooden pillars. There is a spacious viewing platform outside the building.

== See also ==
- List of railway stations in Taiwan
