= Dongshi line =

Defunct railway line in Taichung, Taiwan

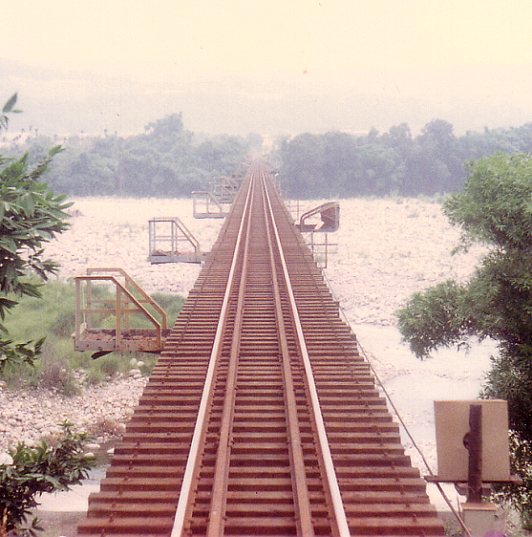
- Railway bridge across the Dajia River in August 1991

Overview
- Native name: 東勢線
- Owner: Taiwan Railways Administration
- Termini: Fengyuan; Dongshi
- Stations: 5

Service
- Type: Heavy rail
- Operator(s): Taiwan Railways Administration

History
- Opened: 12 January 1959
- Closed: 1 September 1991

Technical
- Line length: 14.1 km (8.8 mi)
- Track gauge: 3 ft 6 in (1,067 mm)
- Electrification: None

The Dongshi line (Chinese: 東勢線; pinyin: Dōngshìxiàn) was a railway line of the Taiwan Railways Administration. This was a branch line of the Taichung line and stretched between Fengyuan and Dongshi in Taichung, Taiwan. After the line's abolishment in 1991, the Taichung County government turned the route into a paved bike path known as the Dongfeng Bicycle Greenway.

== History ==
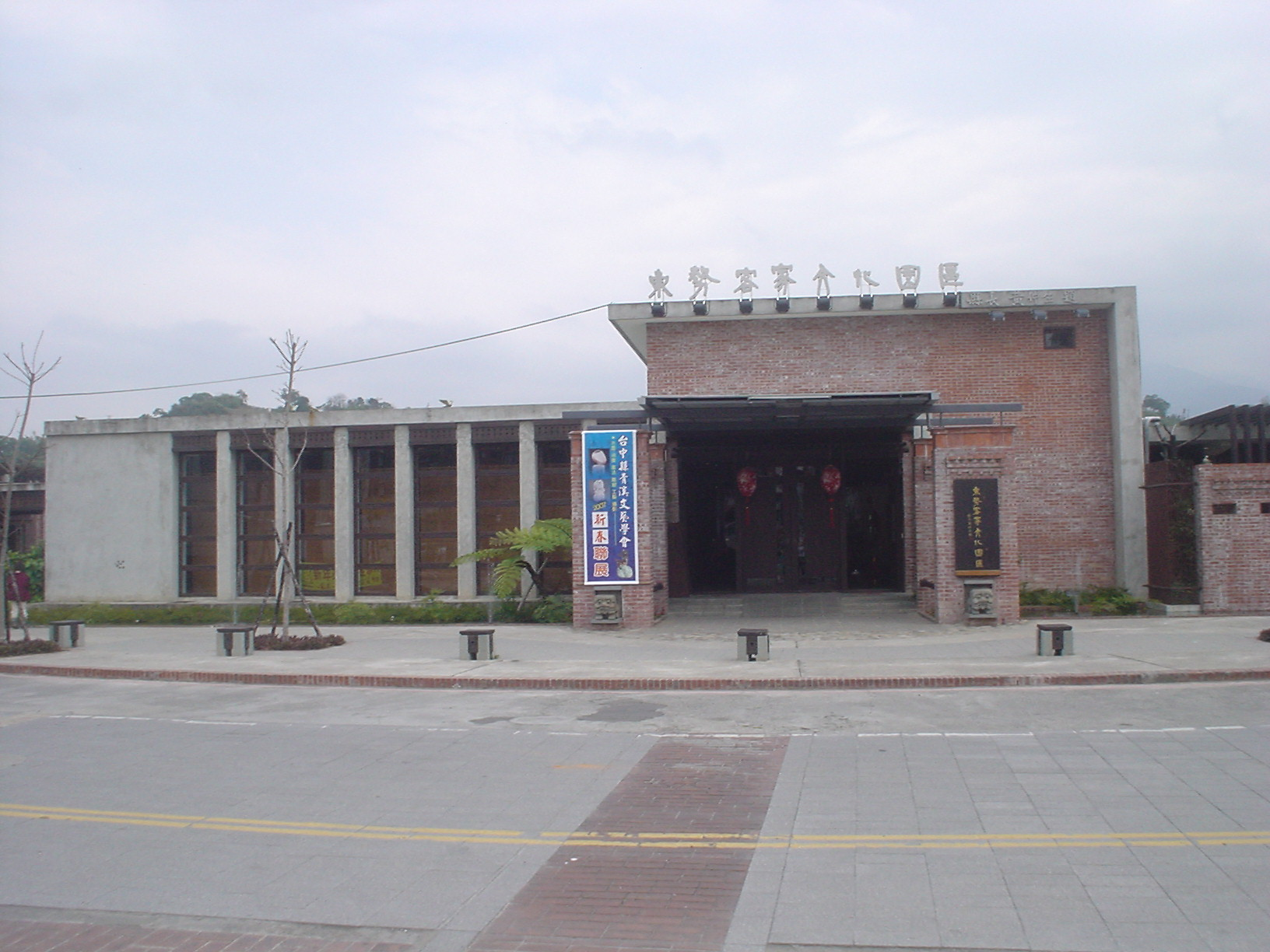
The Dongshih Hakka Cultural Park was converted from the old Dongshi Station building.

The line was first constructed in 1959 to transport lumber from Dasyueshan. It ran a similar route to the defunct Baxianshan Forest Railway between Fengyuan and Eight Immortals Mountain. The entire line was single-tracked and not electrified; the only passing loop was at Shihgang Station.

When the railway was completed in 1959, a large opening ceremony was held at Dongshi. Former Dongshi station master Weizheng Yang recounted that "Tungshih station was packed with people... not everyone has ridden a train before... at the sight of the steam engine thundering down the tracks, everyone cheered." In Shigang, the tracks cross right above a waterfall, which became a well-known vista point.

Aside from transporting lumber, the line also transported passengers, mainly students. The line also transported concrete for the construction of Techi Dam between 1969 and 1974. However, with the closure of lumber industry at Dasyueshan in 1973, ridership sharply declined, causing local residents to petition for the line's closure. The line officially closed on September 1, 1991.

The Taichung County government saw potential for tourism along the route, so a paved bike path known as the Dongfeng Bicycle Greenway was constructed on November 15, 2000, making it the first railway line to be rebuilt in Taiwan. Tungshih and Shihgang stations were refurbished into visitor centers.

In 2010, Taichung Mayor Jason Hu proposed that the Taichung MRT Red line be extended to Dongshi along the former route as part of his "Seven Line Plan".

== Stations ==
During the line's operation, the stations used Wade–Giles.

Name	Chinese	Taiwanese	Hakka	Transfers and notes	Location	
Fengyuan	豐原			→ Taichung line	Fengyuan	Taichung County
Pukou	朴口				Fengyuan	Taichung County
Shihkang	石岡				Shigang	Taichung County
Meitsu	梅子				Shigang	Taichung County
Tungshih	東勢				Dongshi	Taichung County
