= Dongshi District =

District in Taichung, Taiwan

Dongshi 東勢區 Tōsei, Dongshih, Tungshih
- District
- Dongshi District
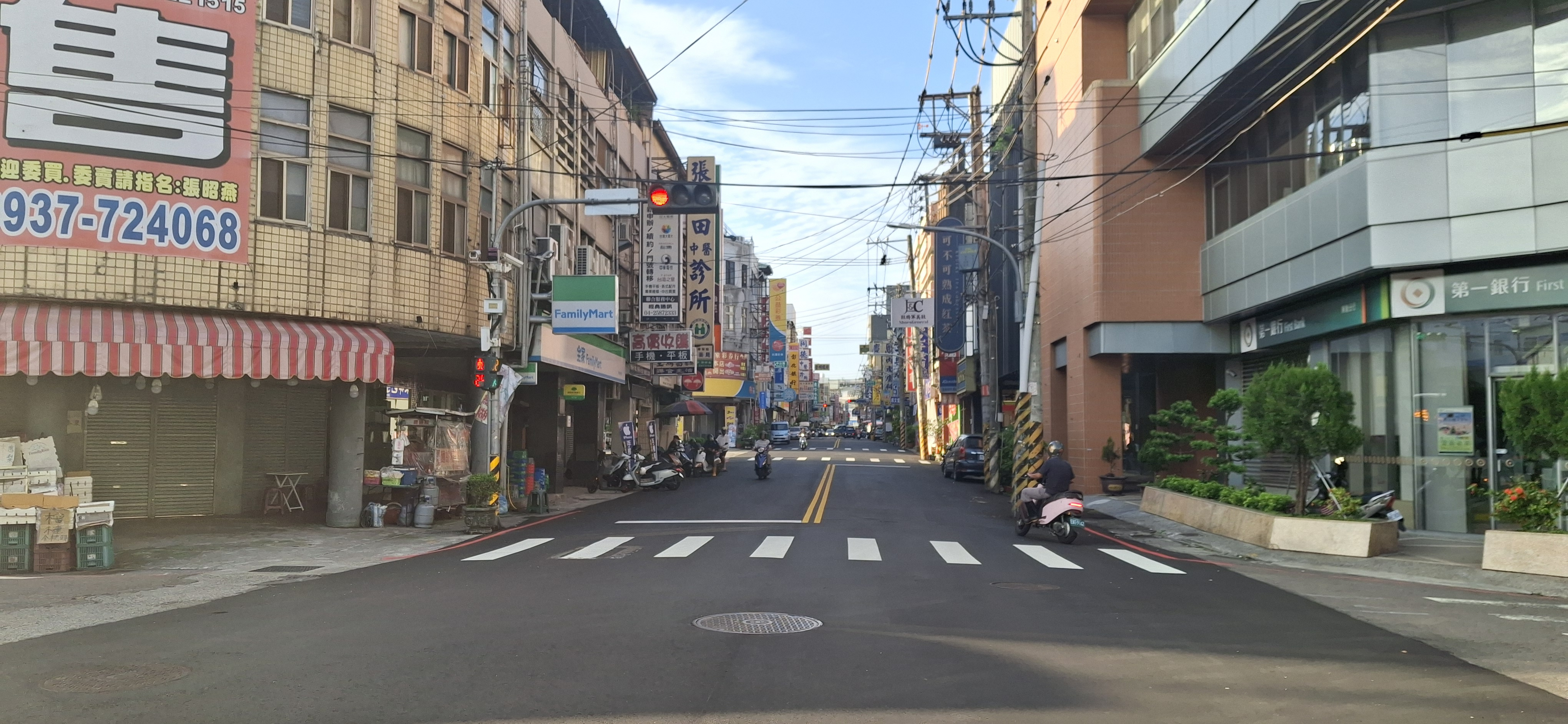

- Dongshi District in Taichung City
- Coordinates: 24°15′31.3″N 120°49′41.4″E
- Country: Taiwan
- Special municipality: Taichung
- Established (District): 2010

Area
  - Total: 117.4065 km^{2} (45.3309 sq mi)

Population (February 2023)
  - Total: 47,765
  - Density: 406.83/km^{2} (1,053.7/sq mi)
- Time zone: UTC+8 (CST)
- Website: www.dongshi.taichung.gov.tw (in Chinese)

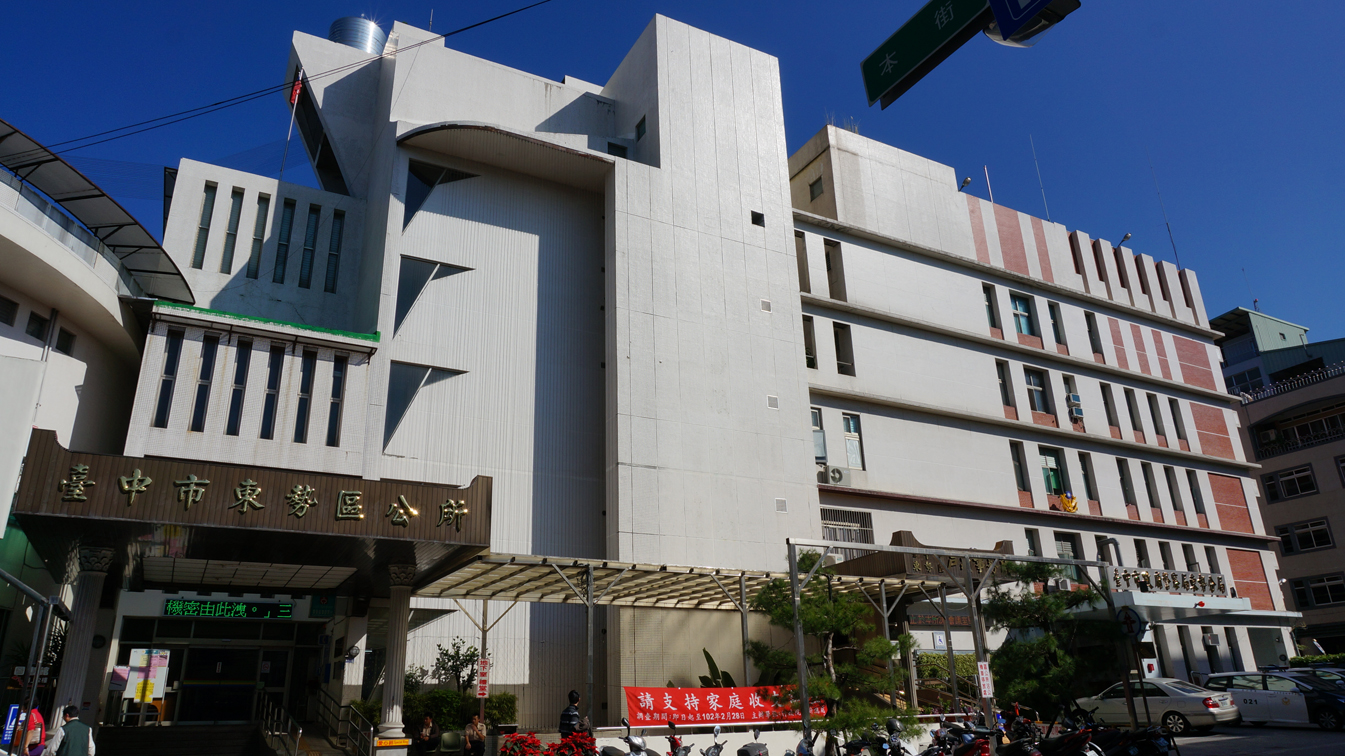
Dongshi District office

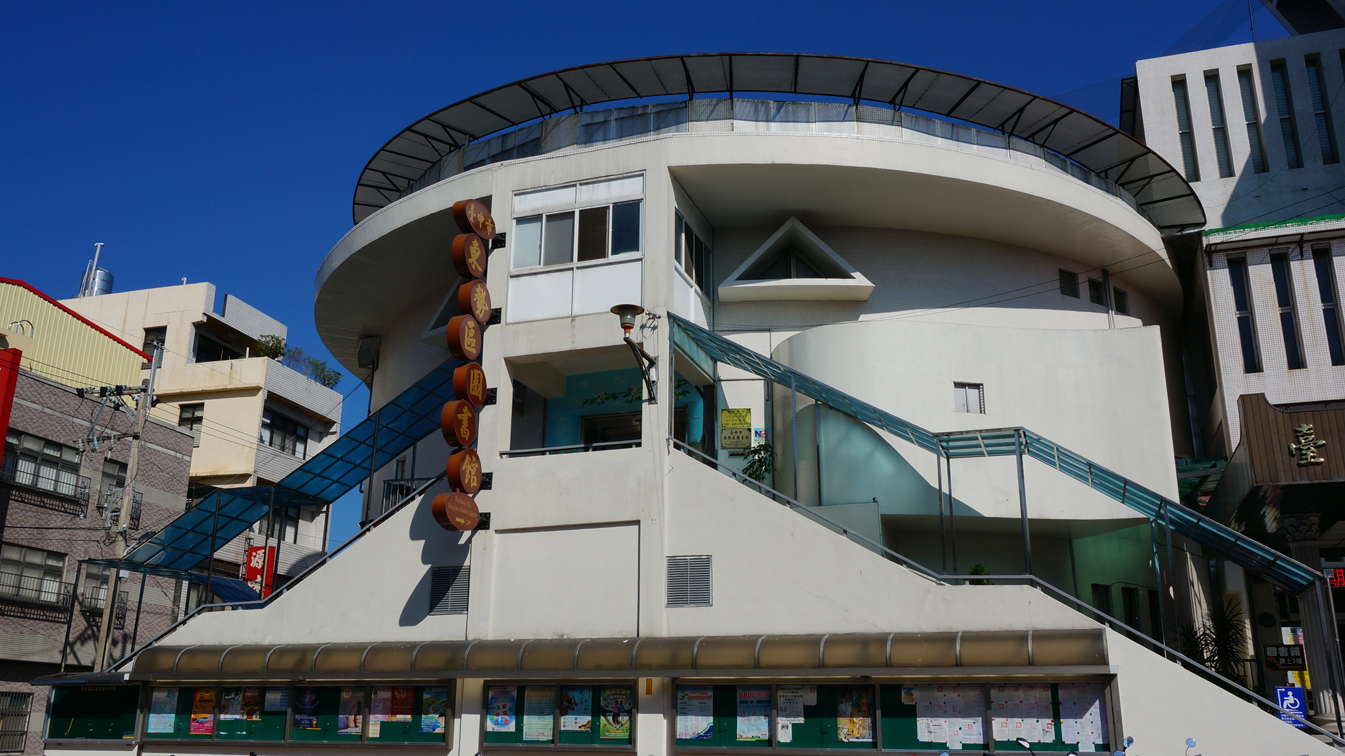
Dongshi District library

Dongshi District (Chinese: 東勢區; pinyin: Dōngshì Qū; Pha̍k-fa-sṳ: Tûng-sṳ) is a suburban district in eastern Taichung, Republic of China (Taiwan). It is the third largest district by area in Taichung City after Heping District and Taiping District. A majority of the residents are Hakka, making it an enclave in an otherwise non-Hakka county. Its Hakka dialect is very distinct compared to the dialects of other counties.

Dongshi is situated on a narrow, north–south oriented plain, flanked by the Dajia River to the west and the Xueshan Range to the east. It is this sense of being pressed up against that ridge, at the easternmost edge of the large west-central plain, that gives the town its name. Its elevation ranges from about 330 meters along the Dajia River to 1201 meters in the foothills of the Central Mountain Range.

The township is bounded by (clockwise from the north) Zhuolan, Heping, Xinshe, Shigang, Fengyuan, Houli, and Sanyi.

== History ==
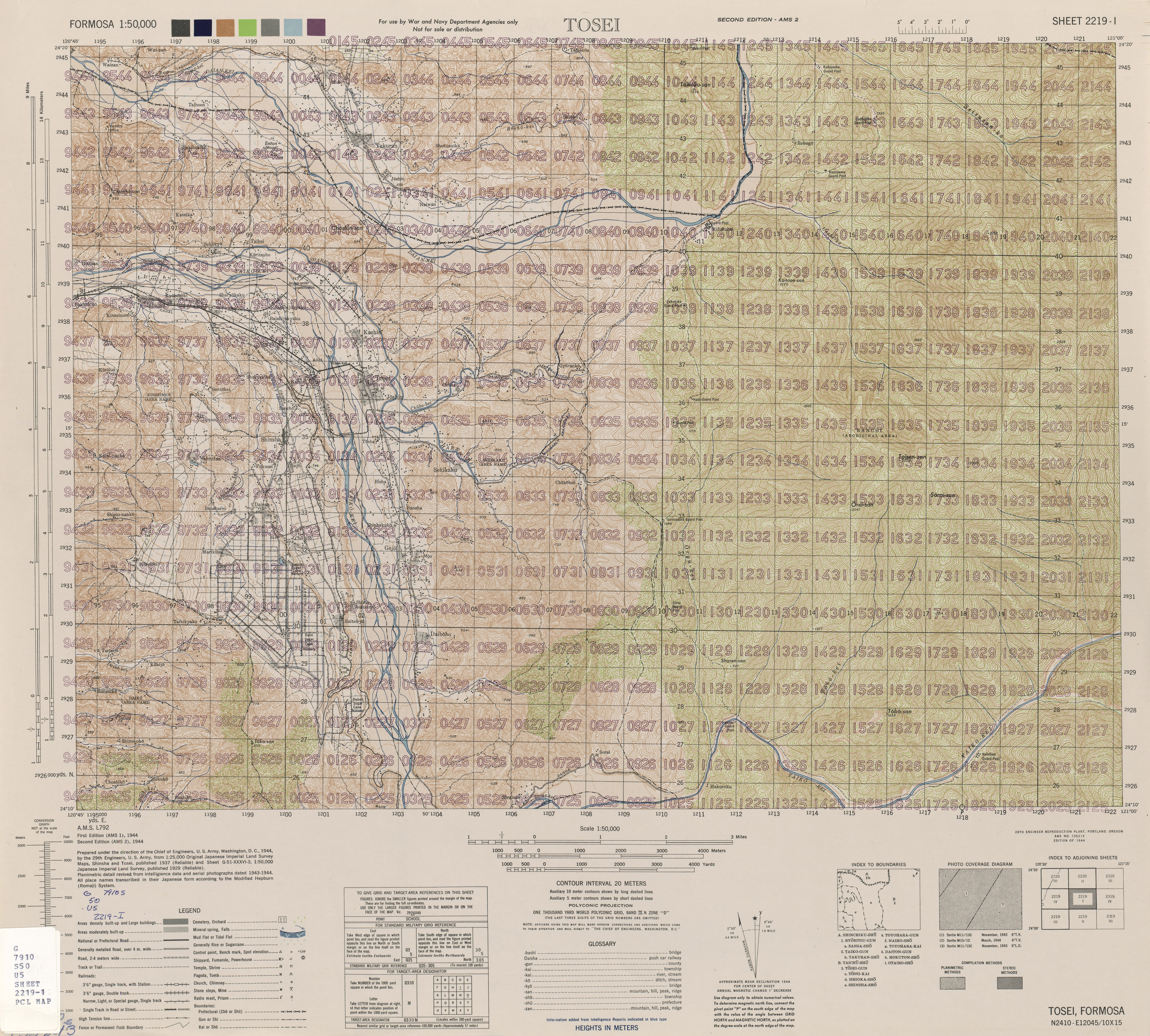
Map of Dongshi (labeled as Tosei) and surrounding area (1944)

After the handover of Taiwan from Japan to the Republic of China in 1945, Dongshi was organized as an urban township of Taichung County. On 25 December 2010, Taichung County was merged with Taichung City and Dongshi was upgraded to a district of the city. Buildings in Dongshi were severely damaged by the Chi-Chi earthquake in 1999.

== Administrative divisions ==
Dongshi is divided into 25 villages, which are Beixing, Zhongning, Tungan, Nanping, Yanping, Shangxin, Guangxing, Taichang, Zhongke, Fulong, Longxing, Xincheng, Yifu, Shangcheng, Xiacheng, Qingdong, Qingfu, Tungxin, Yuening, Xiaxin, Xinglong, Maoxing, Taixing, Beitou and Mingzheng.

== Famous features ==
Dongshi includes some greenspace and significant farmland; largely orchards. Dongshi is known for its pears, which are large and almost spherical with a thin, light yellowish-brown rugose skin. In a good year, their flavor is excellent. Intensive topwork at the start of each season involves grafting Japanese pear bud slips to the tree stock.

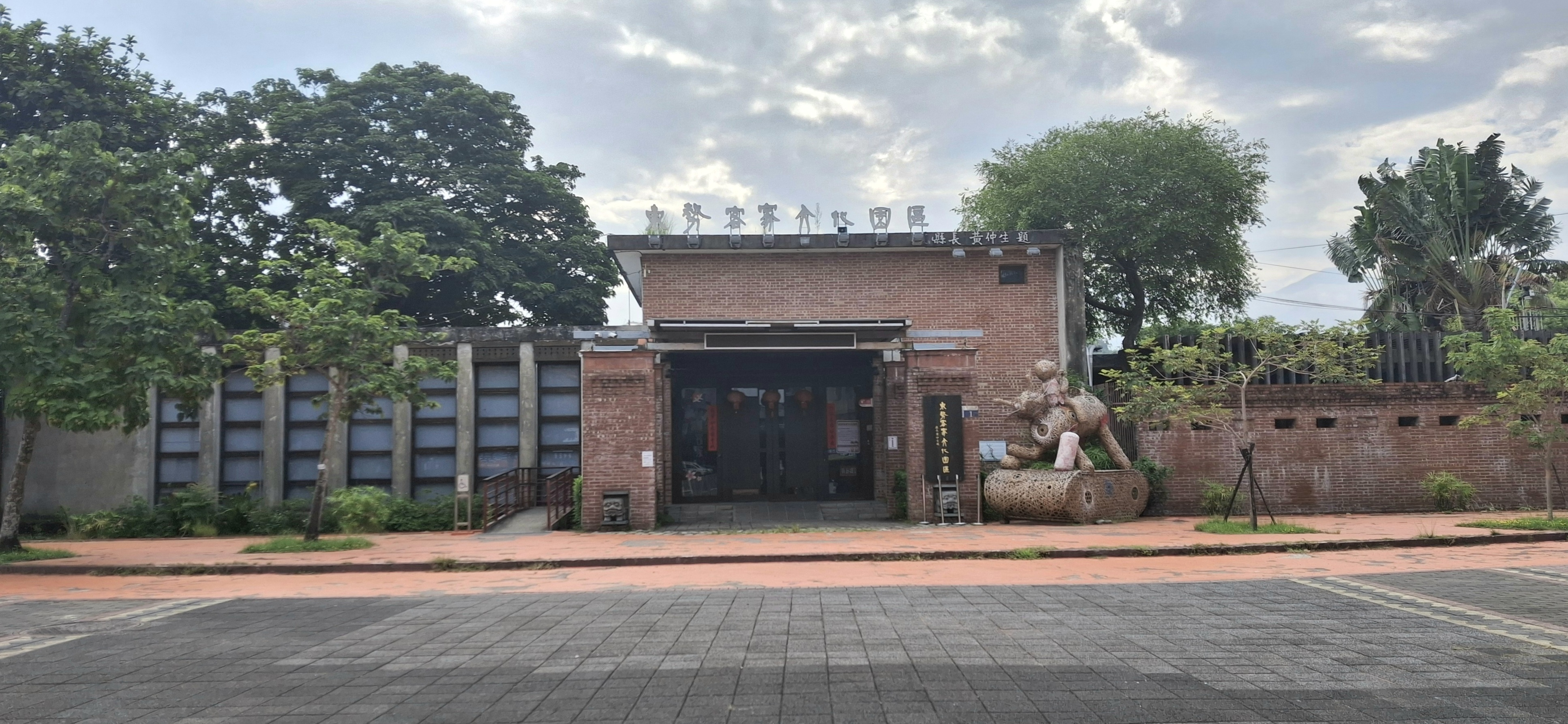
The dongshi hakka cultural center

The old train station has been converted into the Dongshih Hakka Cultural Park. Historical Hakka cultural artefacts along with modern works of art are on display. This area also marks the eastern terminus of the Dongshih-Fongyuan Bicycle Greenway (東豐自行車綠廊.) This greenway was converted from a former railway track. The town is also noted for two large forest parks in the mountainous eastern parts of the county. Dongshi Forest Park (東勢林場) and Sijiaolin (四角林林場) are managed by the Changhua County and Taichung City Agricultural Committees respectively.

== Native products ==
- Persimmon
- Pear

== Tourist attractions ==
- Dongshi Forestry Culture Park
- Fuxing Suspension Bridge
- Shihgang Dam
- Dongshi Forest Garden
- Dongshi Hakka Cultural Park

== Transportation ==
Dongshi is served by Provincial Highway 8, known as the Central Cross-Island Highway, Provincial Highway 3, and Taichung Special Route 1, which leads to the Daxueshan National Forest Recreation Area. In terms of bus transportation, Dongshi District is served by many different bus stops. The city's main bus stop is located on the corner of Fengshi Road and Diwuheng Street. From there, a bus to Fengyuan railway station is about 40 minutes, and a ride to Taichung HSR station takes about 65 minutes.

The main bus stop for Dongshi district

== Notable natives ==
- Chan Hao-ching, tennis athlete
- Latisha Chan, tennis athlete
- Shyu Jong-shyong, Deputy Secretary-General of Executive Yuan (2015–2016)

== See also ==
- Taichung
