= Lilin railway station =

Railway station located in Taichung, Taiwan

Lilin 栗林
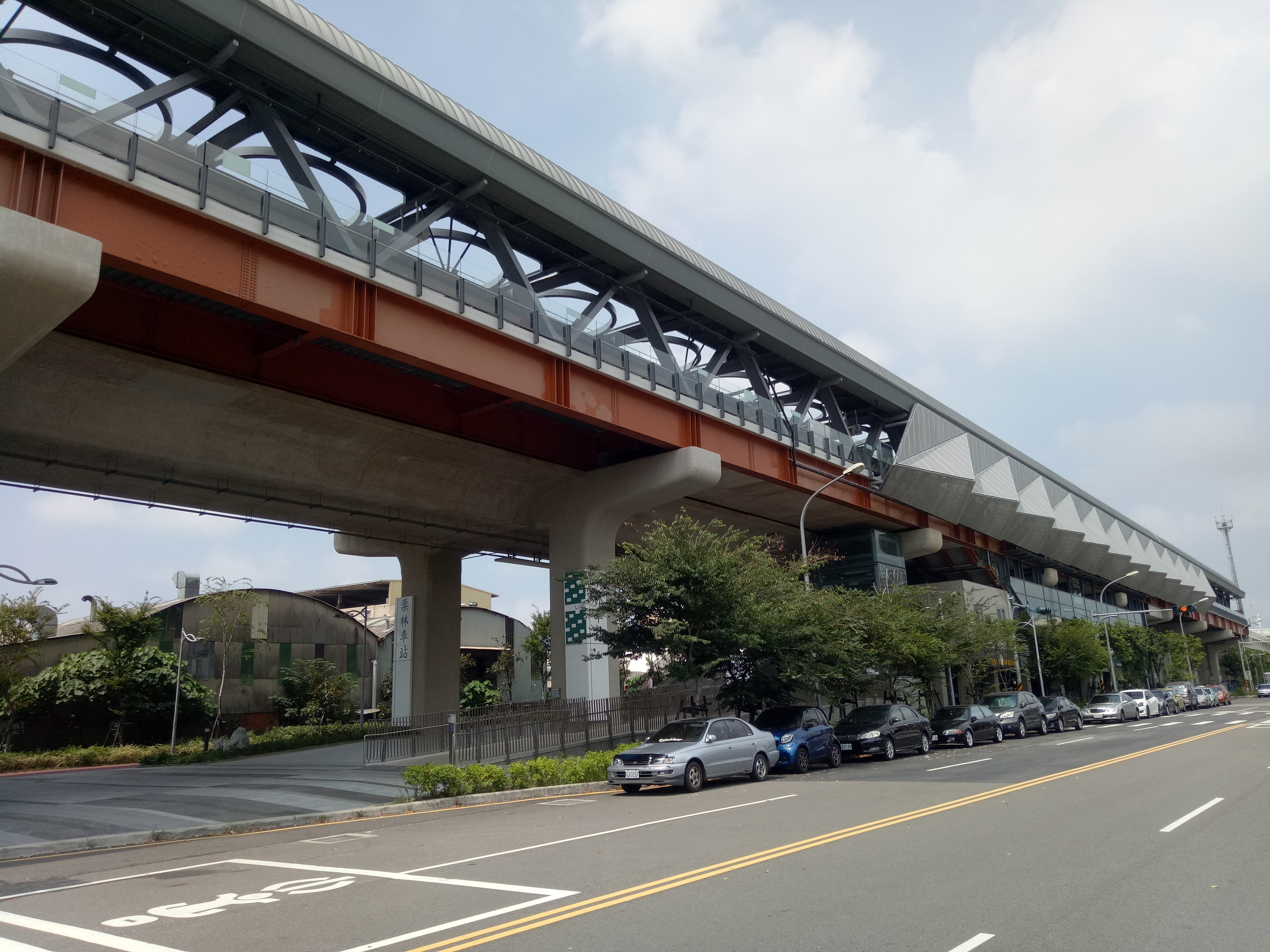

General information
- Location: Tanzi, Taichung, Taiwan
- Coordinates: 24°14′05.7″N 120°42′38.3″E
- Operated by: Taiwan Railway
- Line: Western Trunk line
- Platforms: 2 side platforms

Construction
- Structure type: Elevated

Other information
- Classification: 簡易站 (Taiwan Railways Administration level)

History
- Opening: 28 October 2018
- Previous names: Fengnan Station (豐南車站)

Services
Preceding station	Taiwan Railway	Following station
Fengyuan towards Keelung	Western Trunk line	Tanzi towards Kaohsiung
Location

Lilin Station (Chinese: 栗林車站; pinyin: Lìlín Chēzhàn), previously known as Fengnan (Chinese: 豐南車站; pinyin: Fēngnán Chēzhàn), is a railway station on the Taiwan Railway Taichung line located in Tanzi District, Taichung, Taiwan. It opened on 28 October 2018.

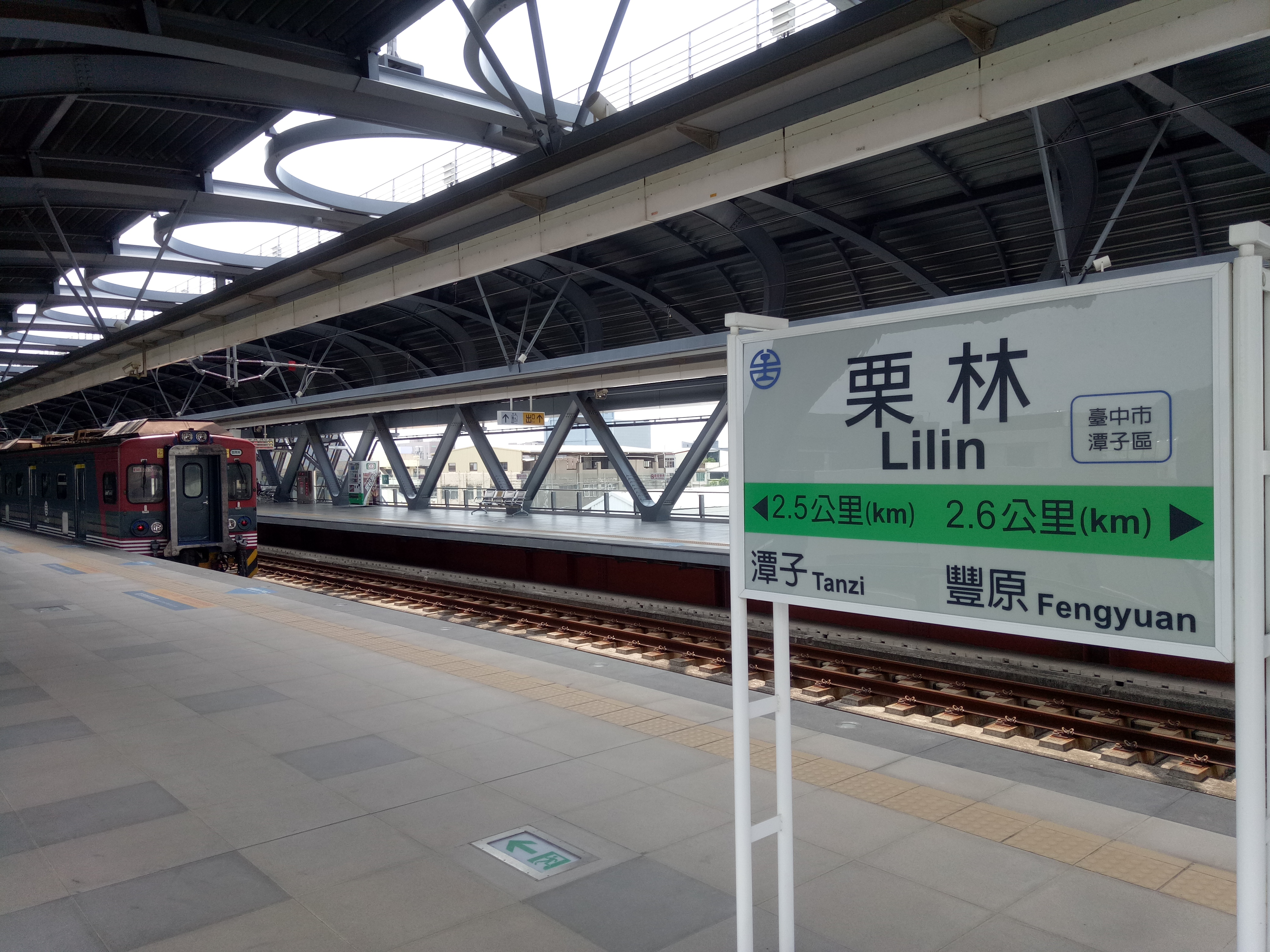
Station platform

== Name ==
Lilin Station was originally planned as Fengnan station (meaning "south of Fengyuan"). However, the station is located within Lilin Village, Tanzi District, not Fengyuan District. In July 2014, the station was renamed Lilin Station.

== See also ==
- List of railway stations in Taiwan
