= Tanzi railway station =

Railway station located in Taichung, Taiwan

Coordinates: 24°12′47.1″N 120°42′20.7″E

Tanzi 潭子
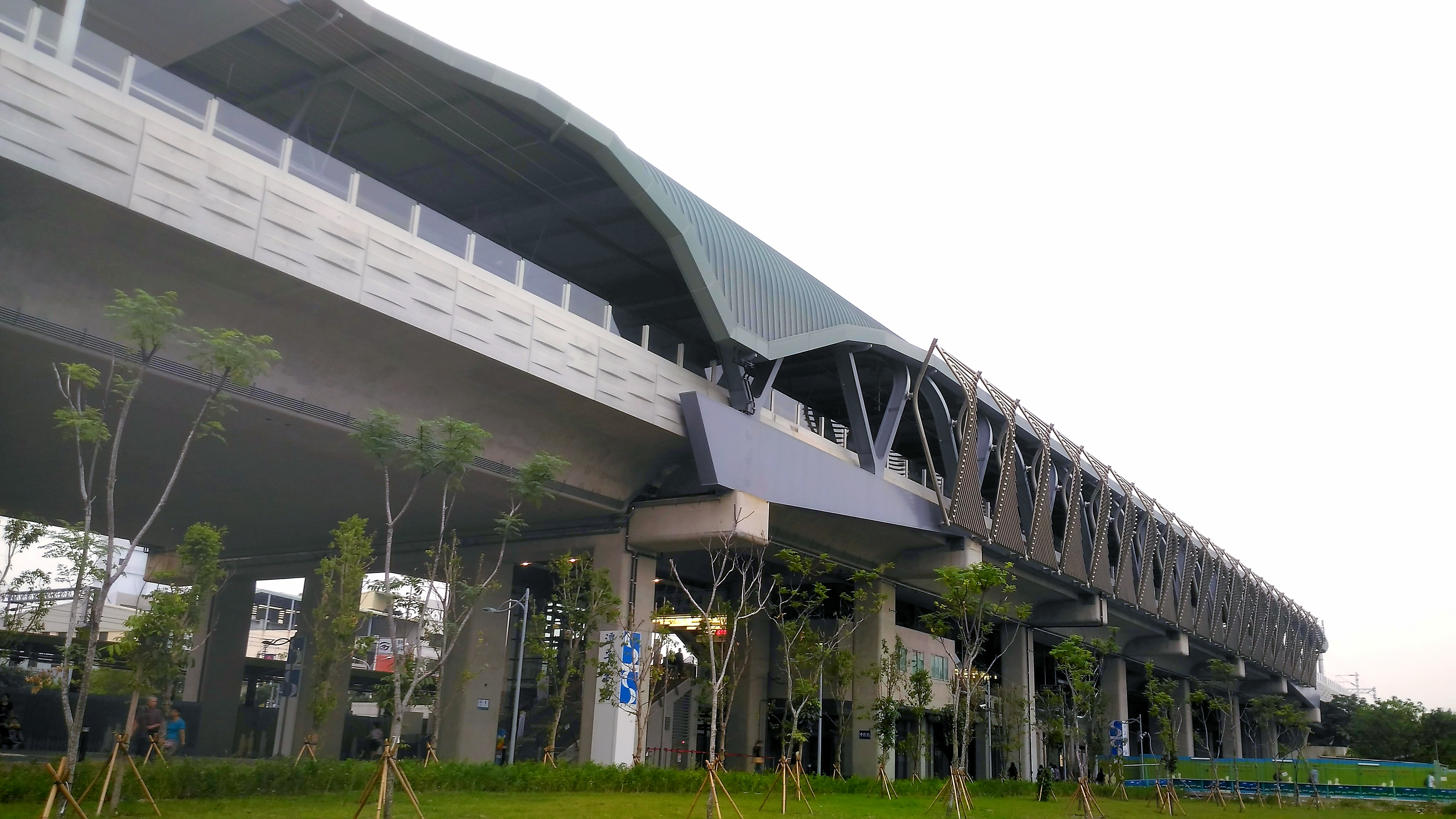

General information
- Location: Tanzi, Taichung; Taiwan
- Operated by: Taiwan Railway Corporation
- Line: Western Trunk line
- Distance: 184.1 km from Keelung
- Platforms: 2 island platforms (1 closed)

Construction
- Structure type: At-grade (will be elevated in future)

Other information
- Classification: 三等站 (Taiwan Railways Administration level)

History
- Opened: 15 May 1905
- Previous names: Tanshiken-eki (潭子墘駅)

Passengers
- 4,961 daily (2024)

Services
Preceding station	Taiwan Railway	Following station
Lilin towards Keelung	Western Trunk line	Toujiacuo towards Kaohsiung
Location

Tanzi (Chinese: 潭子車站; pinyin: Tánzi Chēzhàn) is a railway station on the Taiwan Railway West Coast line (Mountain line) located in Tanzi District, Taichung City, Taiwan. This was once the eastern terminal for the now defunct TRA Shengang line. The current station is located at ground level. As part of the elevating process of the West Coast line, a new elevated Tanzi station is being constructed and was scheduled open on 29 March 2016.

== Platform Layout ==
1	1A	■ West Coast line (southbound)	Towards Taichung, Tainan, Kaohsiung, Pingtung
1	1A	■ West Coast line (southbound Sea line, through Chengzhui line)	Towards Zhuifen, Shalu, Dajia, Tongxiao
1	1A	■ West Coast line (southbound)	Towards Fangliao, Taitung (via South-link line)
2	1B	■ West Coast line (northbound)	Towards Fengyuan, Hsinchu, Taipei, Keelung
2	1B	■ West Coast line (southbound)	Towards Yilan, Taitung, Fangliao, Kaohsiung (via South-link line)

== Train services ==
As a minor station, Tanzi station is primarily serviced by local trains (區間車). A few times per day a Chu-Kuang Express (莒光號) or a Tzu-Chiang Limited Express (自強號) stops at the station.

== Around the station ==
- Zhaixing Villa
