= Tuniu Hakka Cultural Museum =

Museum in Shigang, Taichung, Taiwan

- 土牛客家文化館
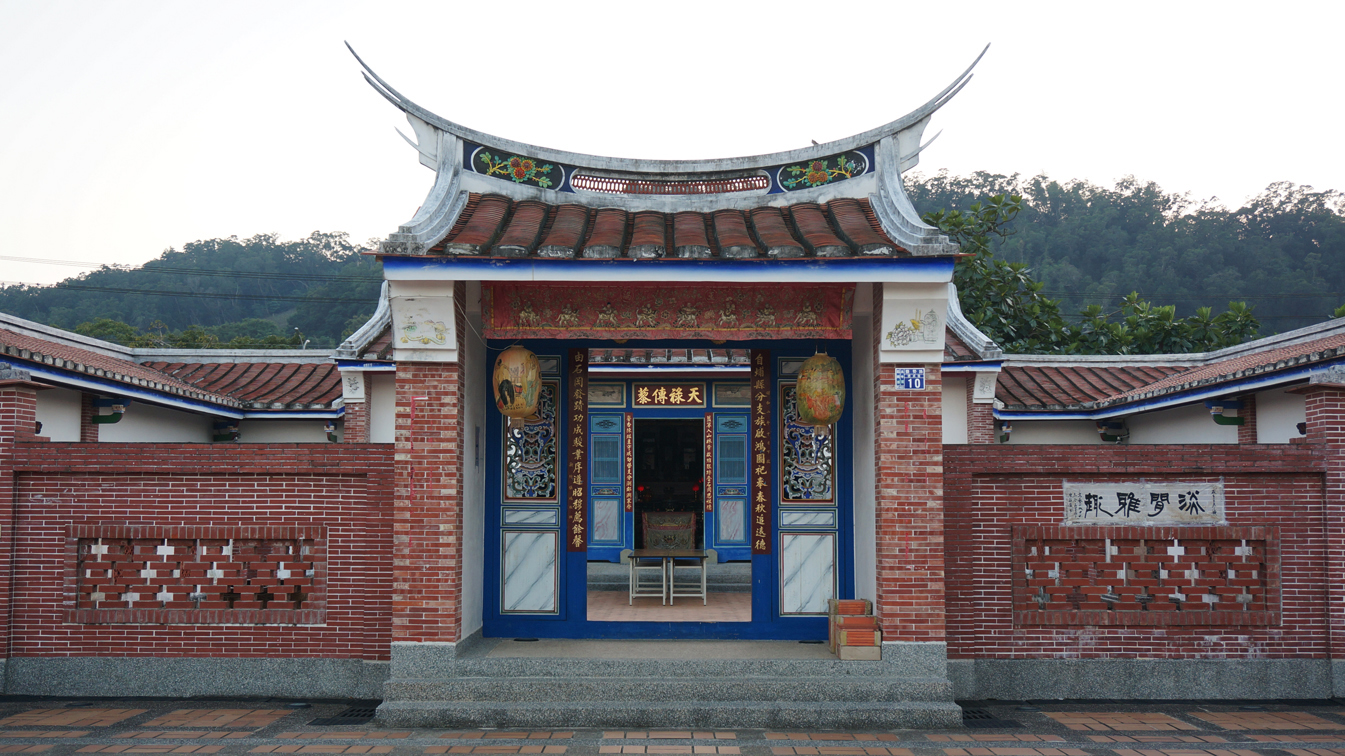
- Established: 9 May 2006
- Location: Shigang, Taichung, Taiwan
- Coordinates: 24°15′54.9″N 120°48′34.4″E
- Type: museum
- Public transit access: Fengyuan Station

The Tuniu Hakka Cultural Museum (traditional Chinese: 土牛客家文化館; simplified Chinese: 土牛客家文化馆; pinyin: Tǔniú Kèjiā Wénhuàguǎn) is a museum in Shigang District, Taichung, Taiwan.

== History ==
The original building belongs to the Liu family. On 21 September 1999, it collapsed due to the 1999 Jiji earthquake. Afterwards, the family applied for government subsidy to reconstruct the building. Six years later it was rebuilt at the original site with its original design and appearance and named Tuniu Hakka Cultural Museum on 9 May 2006.

== Architecture ==
The museum consists of the main reception hall and four exhibition halls. It has also many static and multimedia display.

== Transportation ==
The museum is accessible by bus from Fengyuan Station of Taiwan Railway or Taichung Station of Taiwan High Speed Rail.
