= Taichung Municipal City Huludun Cultural Center =

Cultural center in Fengyuan, Taichung, Taiwan

- 臺中市葫蘆墩文化中心
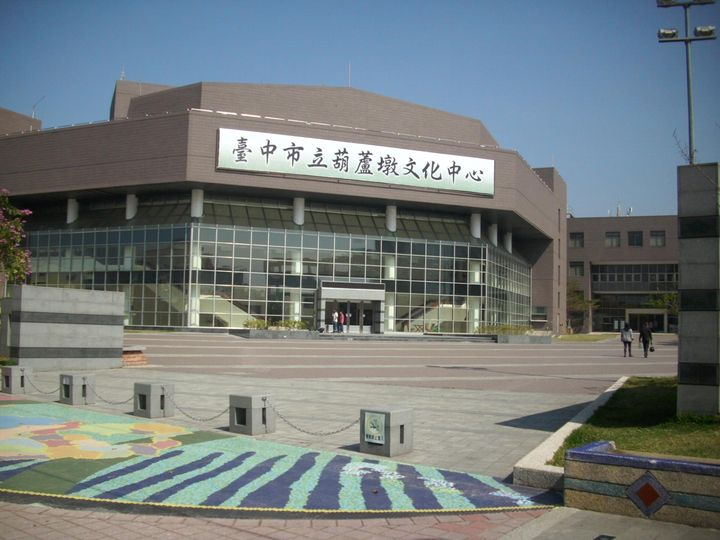
- Interactive map of the Taichung Municipal City Huludun Cultural Center area

General information
- Type: cultural center
- Location: Fengyuan, Taichung, Taiwan
- Coordinates: 24°15′10.1″N 120°43′48.7″E

Technical details
- Floor count: 4

Website
- Official website

The Taichung Municipal City Huludun Cultural Center (traditional Chinese: 臺中市葫蘆墩文化中心; simplified Chinese: 台中市葫芦墩文化中心; pinyin: Táizhōng Shì Húludūn Wénhuà Zhōngxīn) is a cultural center in Fengyuan District, Taichung, Taiwan.

== Architecture ==
The center consists of art galleries and Weaving Craft Museum.

== Transportation ==
The cultural center is accessible within walking distance east of Fengyuan Station of Taiwan Railway.

== See also ==
- List of museums in Taiwan
