= Fengyuan Museum of Lacquer Art =

Museum in Fengyuan, Taichung, Taiwan

- 豐原漆藝館
- Established: 26 May 2002
- Location: Fengyuan, Taichung, Taiwan
- Coordinates: 24°15′18″N 120°44′45″E
- Type: art museum

The Fengyuan Museum of Lacquer Art (traditional Chinese: 豐原漆藝館; simplified Chinese: 丰原漆艺馆; pinyin: Fēngyuán Qīyìguǎn) is a museum about lacquer art in Fengyuan District, Taichung, Taiwan.

== History ==
The idea for the museum establishment dates back to Japanese rule when Fengyuan was the center for lacquer craftmanship and also the commercial center. The museum was opened on 26 May 2002 by the joint cooperation between Taichung City Government, Taichung City Cultural Affairs Bureau, and Fengyuan District Office.

== Architecture ==
The museum is housed in a 2-story building where the ground floor houses the exhibition, education and leisure centers of lacquer craftmanship and the upper floor houses the cultural life of lacquer.

== Exhibitions ==
The museum has the following rooms:

- Exhibition Room
- Demonstration Room
- Research and Education Room

== Transportation ==
The museum is accessible east from Fengyuan Station of Taiwan Railway.

== See also ==
- List of museums in Taiwan
