= Tanzi District =

District in Taichung, Taiwan

Tanzi 潭子區 Tanzih
- District
- Tanzi District
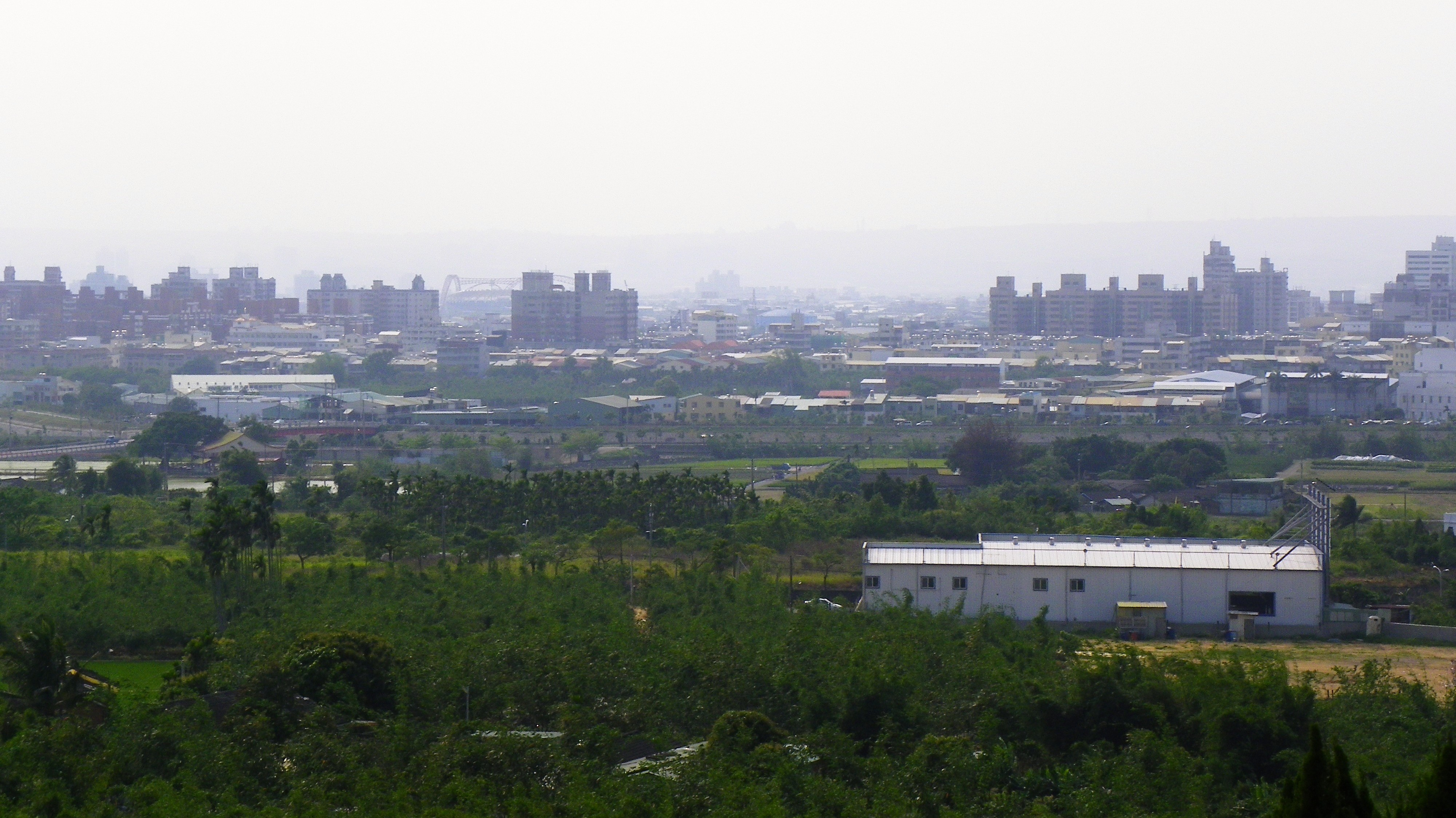

- Tanzi District in Taichung City
- Coordinates: 24°13′05″N 120°42′22″E
- Country: Taiwan
- Special municipality: Taichung
- Established (District): 2010

Area
  - Total: 25.8497 km^{2} (9.9806 sq mi)

Population (February 2023)
  - Total: 108,761
  - Density: 4,207.44/km^{2} (10,897.2/sq mi)
- Time zone: UTC+8 (CST)
- Website: www.tanzi.taichung.gov.tw (in Chinese)

Tanzi District (Chinese: 潭子區) is a suburban district with a population 108,761 as of February 2023, located north of Taichung, Taiwan. It has an area of 25.8497 km^{2}.

== Administrative divisions ==
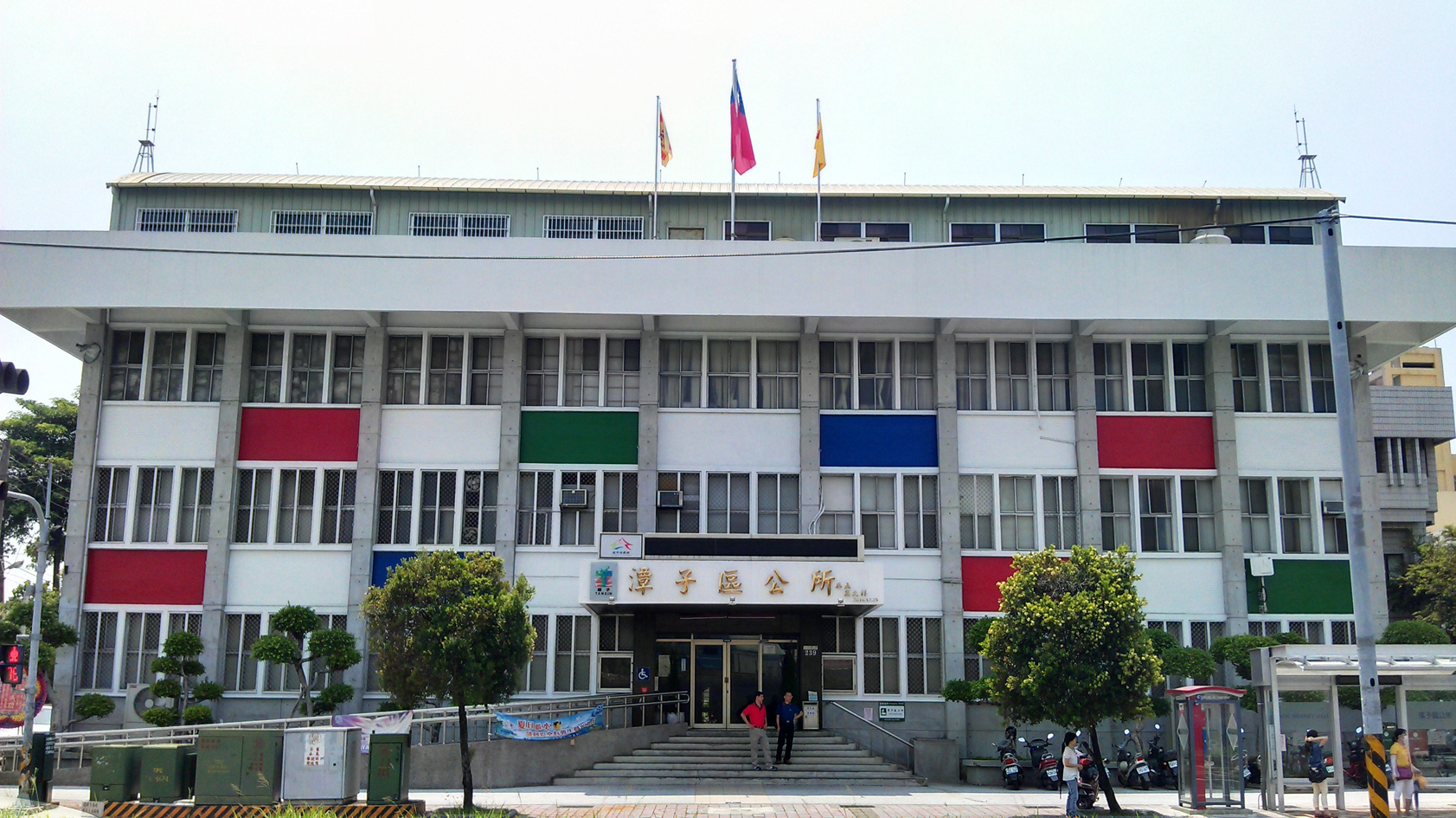
Tanzi District Office

Tanxiu, Tanbei, Tanyang, Furen, Toujia, Toujiatung, Jiaxing, Jiafu, Ganzhe, Tungbao, Dafu, Dafeng, Lilin, Jiaren, Xintian and Juxing Village.

== Economy ==
Taichung Tanzi Export Processing Zone is located in the township, providing a variety of employment opportunities.

== Hospital ==
Created by Tzu Chi in 2007.

== Native products ==
- Rice
- oranges

== Education ==
- Tanzi Elementary School
- Haiwen Middle School
- Ivy Collegiate Academy
- Sintian Mountain
- Hongwen High School

== Tourist attractions ==
- Zhaixing Villa

== Transportation ==
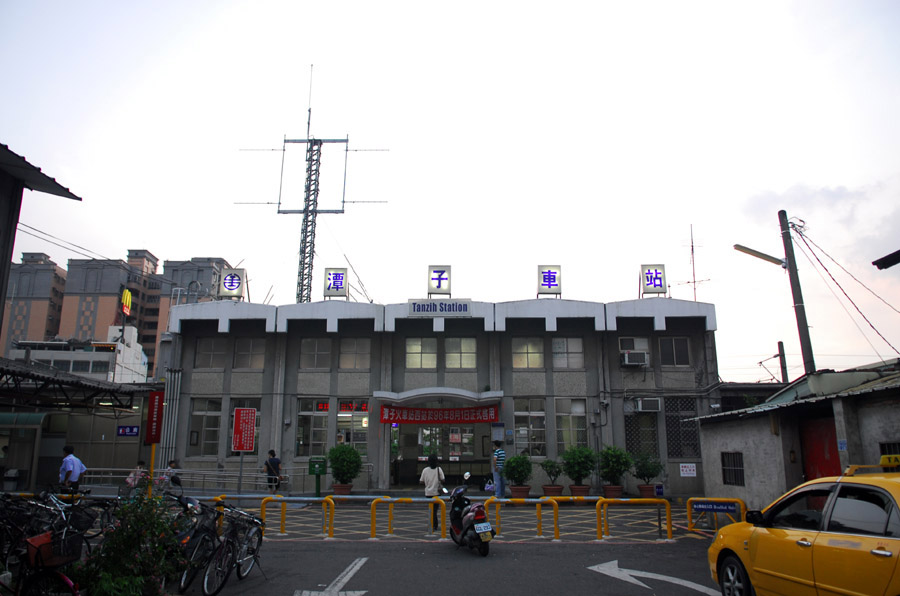
Tanzi Station

- Lilin Station
- Tanzi Station
- Toujiacuo Station
