= Dongshi Forestry Culture Park =

Forest in Dongshi, Taichung, Taiwan

- 東勢林業文化園區
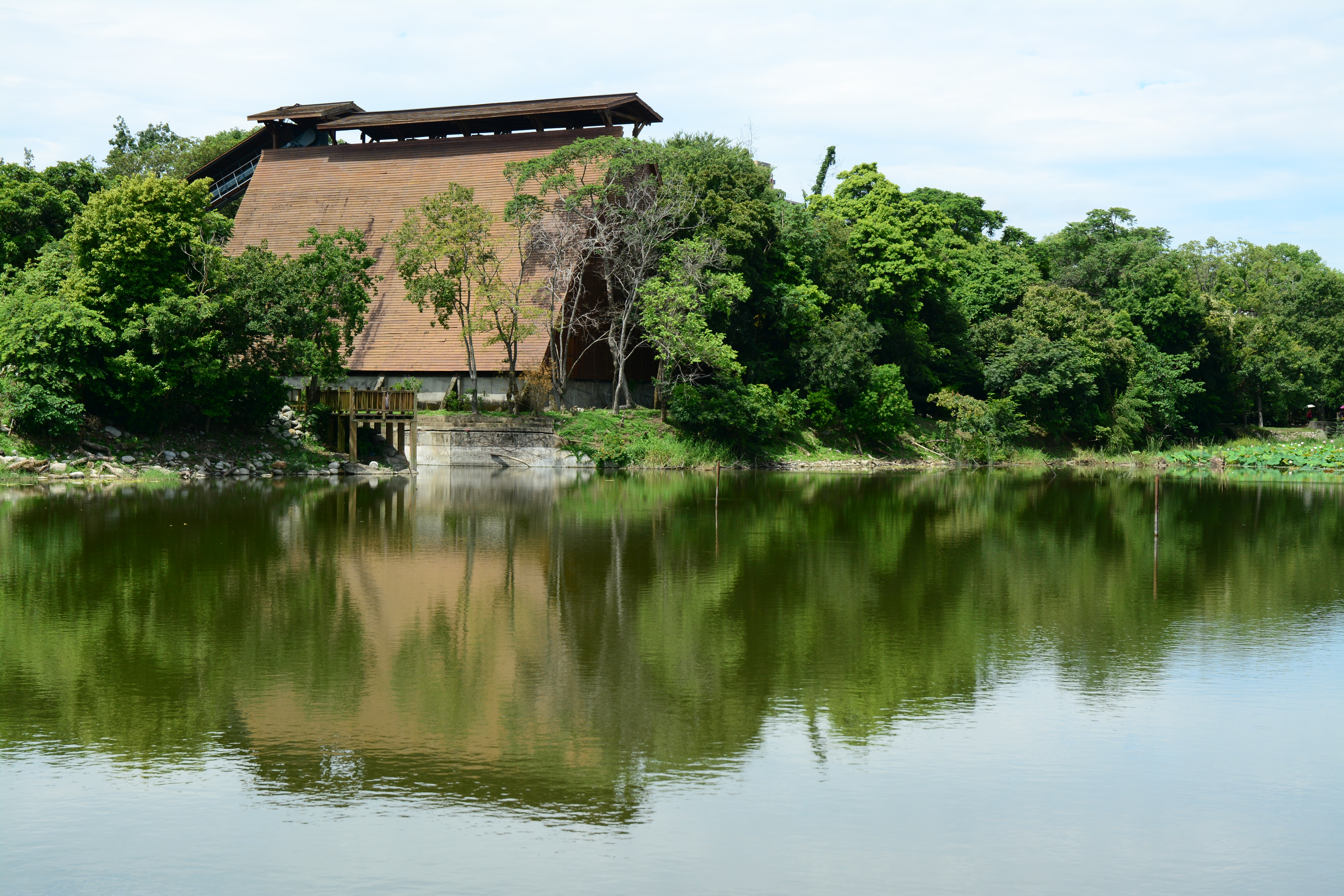
- Interactive map of Dongshi Forestry Culture Park
- Type: forest
- Location: Dongshi, Taichung, Taiwan
- Coordinates: 24°14′37.8″N 120°50′01.2″E
- Area: 225 hectares (560 acres)
- Elevation: 500–700 m (1,600–2,300 ft)
- Established: 1956

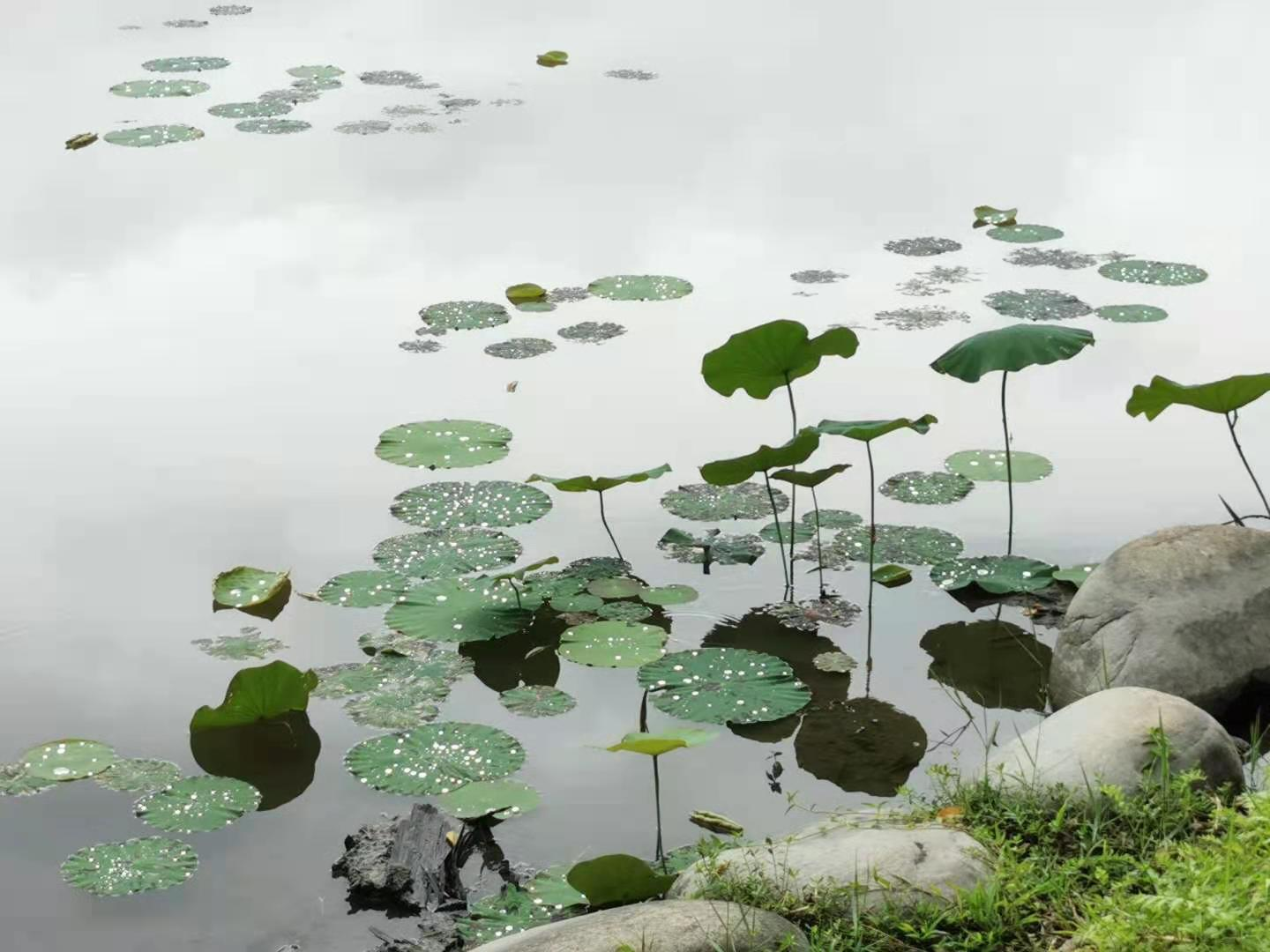
The wood storage pond in the past has become a well-known lotus pond.

The Dongshi Forestry Culture Park (traditional Chinese: 東勢林業文化園區; simplified Chinese: 东势林业文化园区; pinyin: Dōngshì Línyè Wénhuà Yuánqū) is a forest in Dongshi District, Taichung, Taiwan.

== History ==
The forest area was originally established in 1956. In 1960, the Taiwan Daxueshan Forestry Corporation was established to collaborate with the Government of the United States where they funded the forestry development into logging production center. The total lumber processing and production area was 28 hectares, with a staff count of 275 at its peak production. In 1973, the production saw a decline due to the unsuitable tools and machines used for the type of logs processed. In 1974, the site was incorporated into the Daxueshan Forest District Demonstration Office of the Forestry Bureau. In 1988, the landlord of the factories asked for the site to be returned. Subsequently, the bureau decided to preserve the area.

In 2004, a plan to create the Dongshi Forestry Cultural Park was unveiled. However, the plan was put on hold due to the wildfire which struck the forest on 13 May 2006, which resulted more than half of the forest area destroyed. Soon after that, restoration works were made to continue transforming it into a cultural park. On 24 December 2014, the Executive Yuan ratified the development plan of the area under the Act for Promotion of Private Participation in Infrastructure Projects to attract private investors.

== Geology ==
The park spreads over an area of 225 hectares at an elevation of 500–700 meters above sea level. It also features a hiking trail and a 5-hectare pond. There is all year round flower and fireflies viewing at the park.

== Architecture ==
The park features relics and tools used by the corporation during its operational time. It also has various facilities such as log cabins, playgrounds, camping grounds, barbecue areas and conference rooms.

== See also ==
- List of parks in Taiwan
