= Zhaixing Villa =

Former house in Tanzi, Taichung, Taiwan

- 摘星山莊
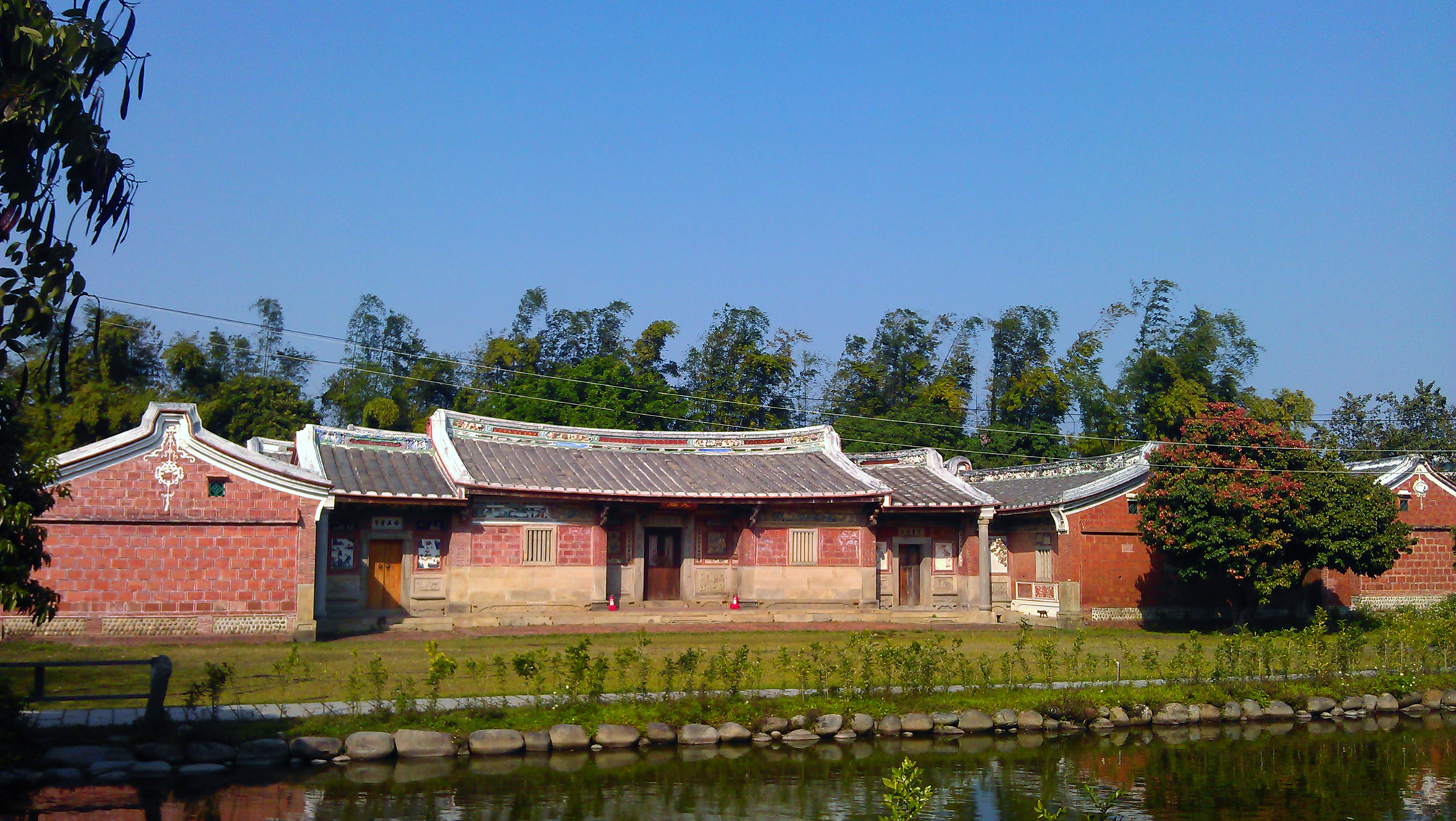
- Interactive map of the Zhaixing Villa area

General information
- Type: former house
- Location: Tanzi, Taichung, Taiwan
- Coordinates: 24°13′27.9″N 120°41′49.9″E
- Construction started: 1871
- Completed: 1879

The Zhaixing Villa (traditional Chinese: 摘星山莊; simplified Chinese: 摘星山庄; pinyin: Zhāixīng Shānzhuāng) is a former house in Tanzi District, Taichung, Taiwan.

== Name ==
The name Zhaixing means plucking stars.

== History ==
The building was constructed by Qing Dynasty General Lin Chi-chung which was started in 1871 and completed in 1879. In 1997, the former house was declared a historical building and was taken over by Taichung County Government.

== Architecture ==
The building is a traditional courtyard house which is surrounded by garden, quadrangles and has a pond in front. It features a coffee shop and souvenir shop.

== Transportation ==
The building is accessible within walking distance northwest of Tanzi Station of Taiwan Railway. Alternatively, it is also accessible via Bus from Zhaixing Villa Bus stop.

== See also ==
- List of tourist attractions in Taiwan
