= Toujiacuo railway station =

Railway station in Tanzi, Taichung, Taiwan

Coordinates: 24°11′43.8″N 120°42′14.3″E

Toujiacuo 頭家厝
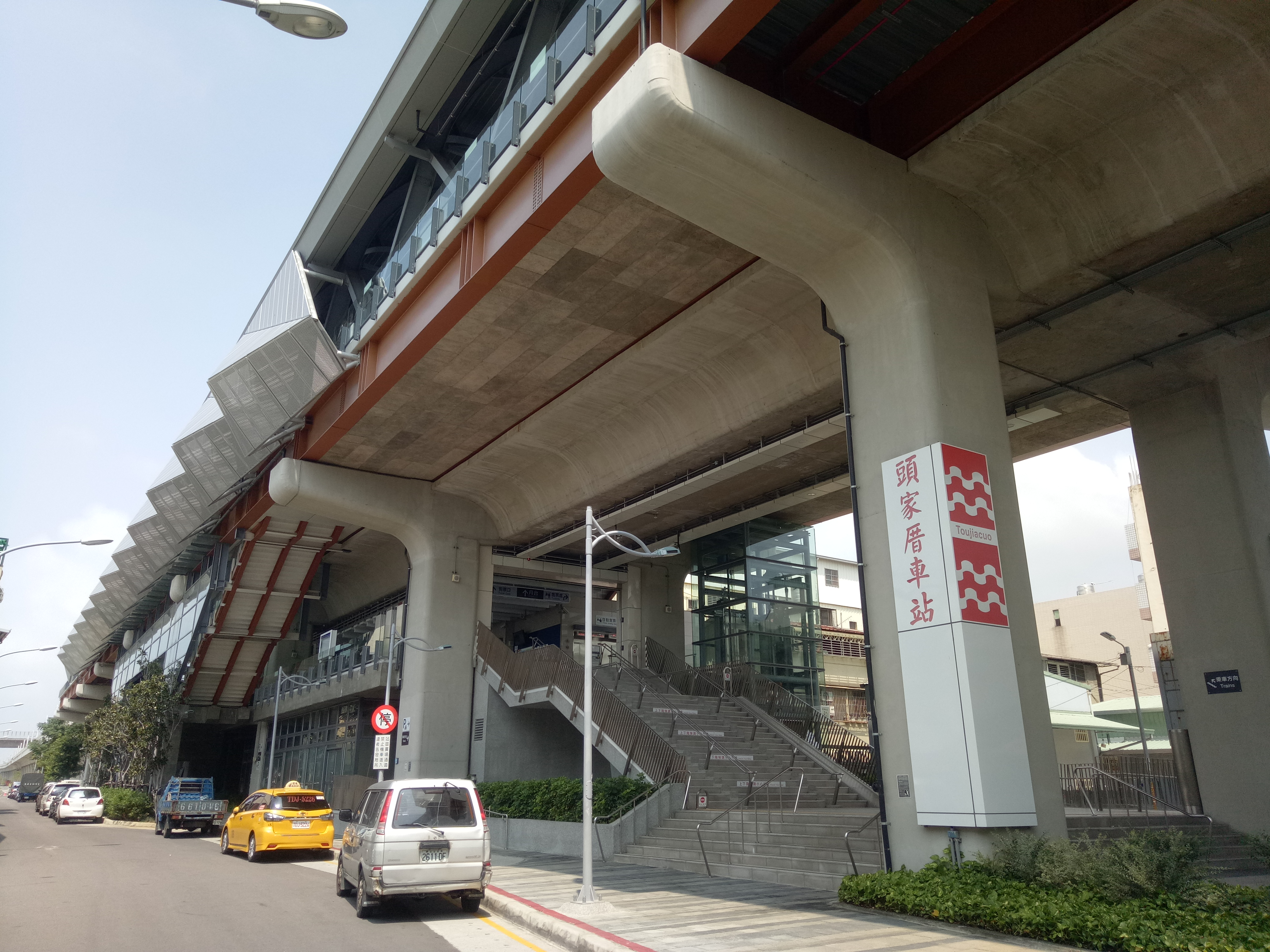

General information
- Location: Tanzi, Taichung; Taiwan
- Operated by: Taiwan Railway
- Line: Western Trunk line
- Platforms: 2 side platforms

Construction
- Structure type: Elevated

Other information
- Classification: 簡易站 (Taiwan Railways Administration level)

History
- Opening: 28 October 2018

Services
Preceding station	Taiwan Railway	Following station
Tanzi towards Keelung	Western Trunk line	Songzhu towards Kaohsiung
Location

Toujiacuo (Chinese: 頭家厝車站; pinyin: Tóujiācuò Chēzhàn) is a railway station on the Taiwan Railway Taichung line located in Tanzi District, Taichung, Taiwan. It opened on 28 October 2018.

== See also ==
- List of railway and metro stations in Taiwan
