= Dongshih Hakka Cultural Park =

Cultural center in Dongshi, Taichung, Taiwan

- 東勢客家文化園區
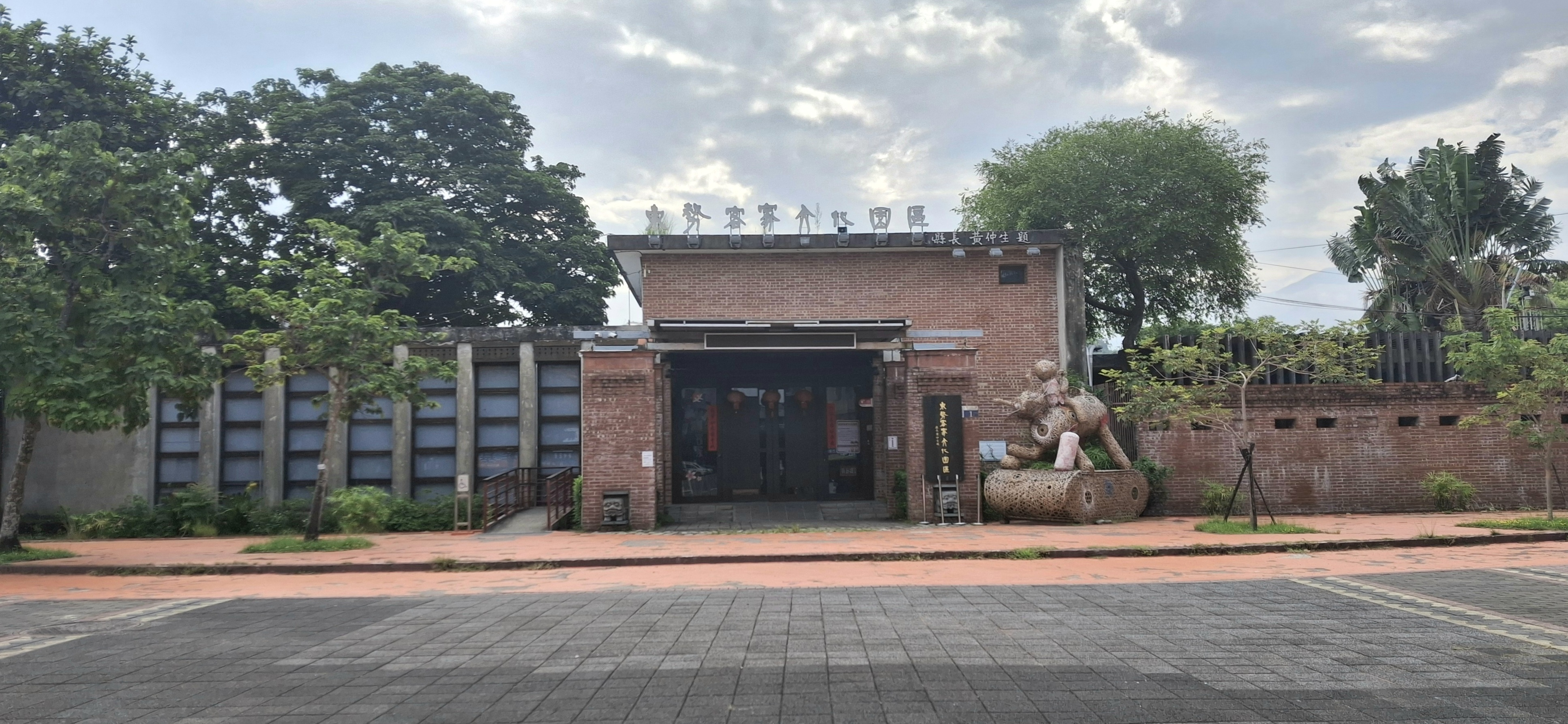
- Interactive map of the Dongshih Hakka Cultural Park area

General information
- Type: cultural center
- Location: Dongshi, Taichung, Taiwan
- Coordinates: 24°15′27.7″N 120°49′55.2″E

The Dongshih Hakka Cultural Park (traditional Chinese: 東勢客家文化園區; simplified Chinese: 东势客家文化园区; pinyin: Dōngshì Kèjiā Wénhuà Yuánqū) is a Hakka cultural center in Dongshi District, Taichung, Taiwan.

== History ==
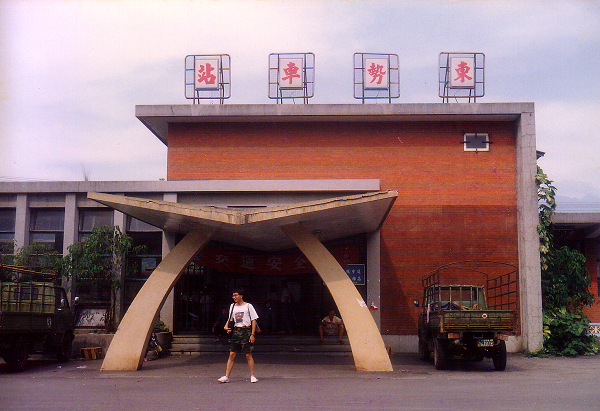
Dongshih Railway Station

The idea of the establishment of the center was originated from Dongshih Jhuang Cultural Association. The building was renovated from the waiting area of the former Dongshih train station (Chinese: 東勢車站), constructed during the Japanese rule to connect Dongshi with sugarcane trading areas. The platform and old facilities of the train station were removed during the renovation but the passengers waiting benches were kept.

== Architecture ==
The building was constructed with Hakka architectural style.

== Exhibitions ==
The center displays cultural heritage and arts exhibition of Hakka culture.

== See also ==
- List of tourist attractions in Taiwan
