= Fengyuan District =

District in Taichung, Taiwan

Fengyuan 豐原區
- District
- Fengyuan District
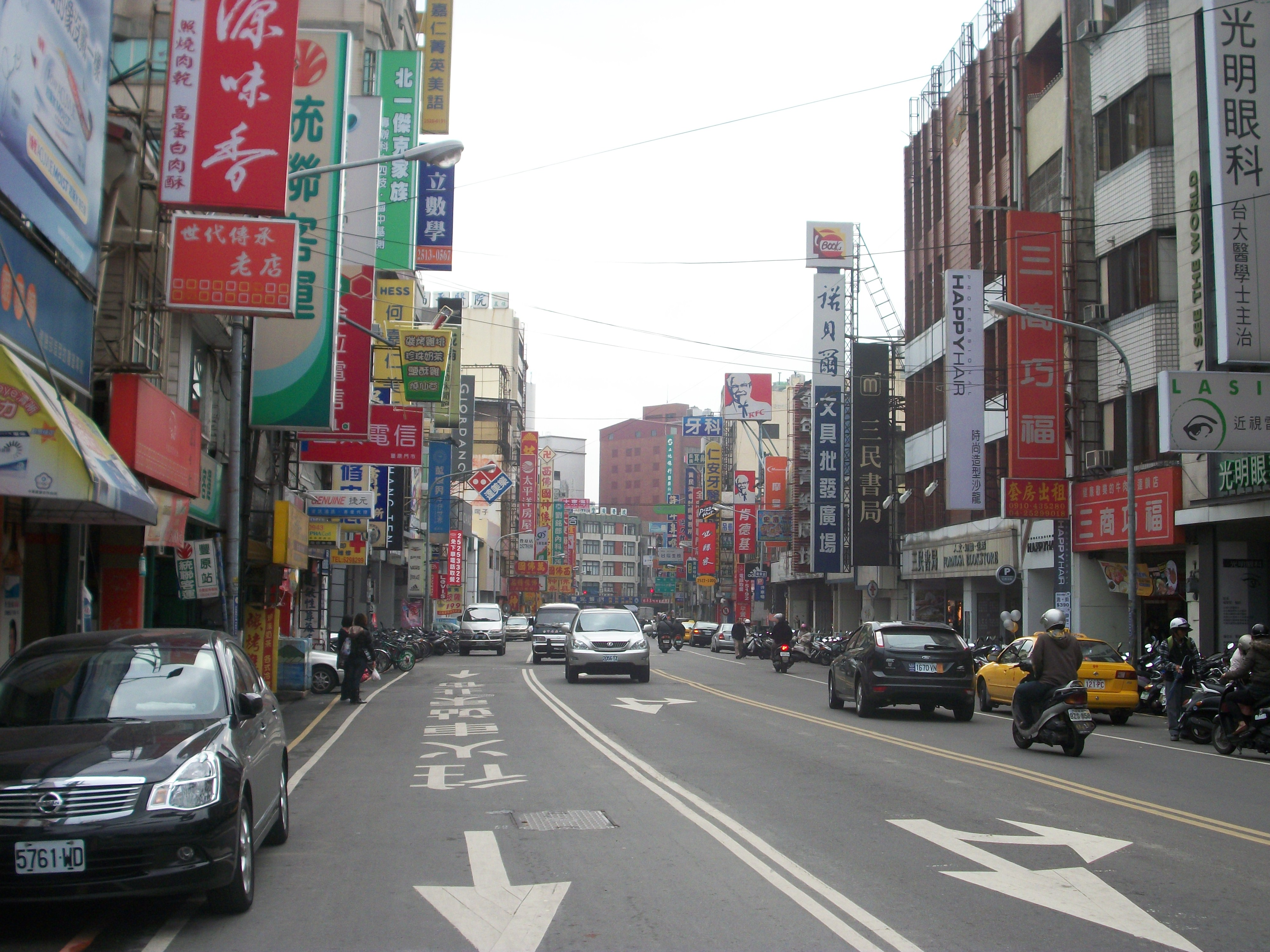

- Coordinates: 24°15′N 120°43′E
- Country: Republic of China (Taiwan)
- Special municipality: Taichung

Area
  - Total: 41.1845 km^{2} (15.9014 sq mi)

Population (February 2023)
  - Total: 163,750
  - Density: 4,031/km^{2} (10,440/sq mi)
- Time zone: UTC+8 (National Standard Time)
- Postal code: 420
- Website: www.fengyuan.taichung.gov.tw (in Chinese)

Fengyuan District
- Traditional Chinese: 豐原區
- Simplified Chinese: 丰原区
Transcriptions
Standard Mandarin
- Hanyu Pinyin: Fēngyuán Qū
- Bopomofo: ㄈㄥ ㄩㄢˊ ㄑㄩ
- Tongyong Pinyin: Fongyuán Cyu
Southern Min
- Hokkien POJ: Hong-goân-khu
- Tâi-lô: Hong-guân-khu

Alternative Chinese name
- Traditional Chinese: 葫蘆墩
Transcriptions
Standard Mandarin
- Hanyu Pinyin: Húludūn
- Bopomofo: ㄏㄨˊ ˙ㄌㄨ ㄉㄨㄣ
Southern Min
- Hokkien POJ: Hô͘-lô͘-tun
- Tâi-lô: Hôo-lôo-tun

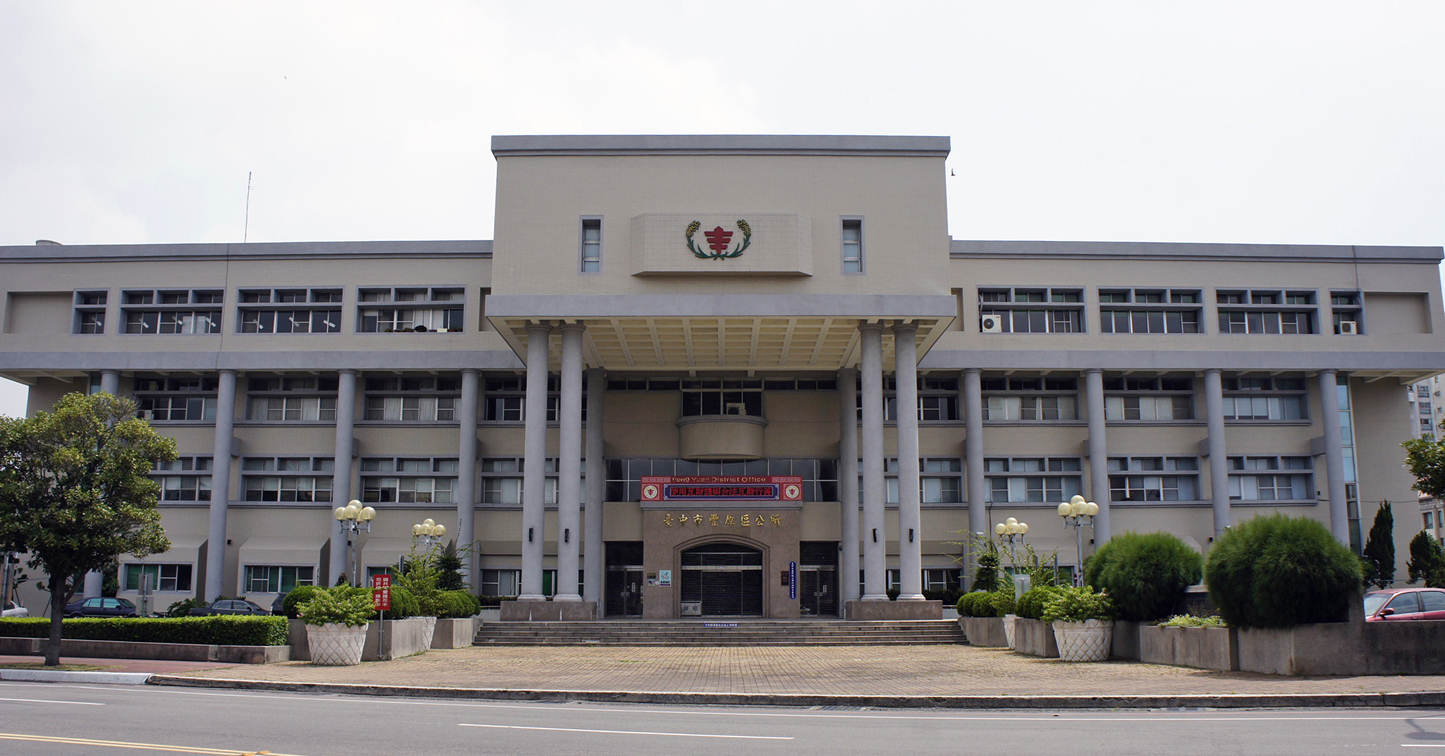
Fengyuan District office

Fengyuan District (Chinese: 豐原區) is a district in north-central Taichung, Taiwan on the south bank of the Dajia River. Fengyuan district is the third most populated district in the former Taichung County, after Dali and Taiping district. Fengyuan was called Huludun in early times, meaning "gourd" in Chinese, for a gourd-shape pile of mud found in Fengyuan by the aborigines. The rice produced in Fengyuan is famous for its high quality and the bakery industry prospered in later decades. Because of its location of the intersection of Taiwan Railways Administration Western Trunk line and Dongshi branch line, Fengyuan quickly expanded after World War II. It soon became one of the regions with great economic and cultural development in central Taiwan. After the merger of Taichung City and Taichung County in 2010, population and economic growth slowed slightly, so recently, Fengyuan faces the challenge of being marginalized.

== History ==
Before the arrival of the Han Chinese, the area of that is now Fengyuan was inhabited by Taiwanese aborigines. Their name for the area, meaning "thriving pine forest", was transcribed into Chinese characters as 泰耶爾墩. Before the mid-18th century, the area was a territory of the Pazeh people, which they called Haluton. This name was adapted into Hokkien as Haloton (Chinese: 葫蘆墩; Pe̍h-ōe-jī: Hô͘-lô͘-tun; lit. 'gourd mound').

Han immigration to the area began during late Qing rule. Liu Mingchuan gave the area a nickname of "little Suzhou" due to its prosperity and scenic beauty.

=== Empire of Japan ===
In 1905, during Japanese rule, the Holotun Station was erected, putting the area along a main thoroughfare. In 1920, the Governor-General of Taiwan gave the town its name, Toyohara (Japanese: 豐原), meaning flourishing plain. Emperor Meiji, Emperor Taishō, and Emperor Hirohito ate rice supplied from Toyohara until 1953.

=== After World War II ===
After World War II in 1945, the area was renamed to Fengyuan and was organized as an urban township of Taichung County. In 1950, it was made the capital of the county from the former capital Yuanlin after the separation of Changhua County and Nantou County from Taichung County. On 1 March 1976, Fengyuan was upgraded to a county-administered city due to its population. On 25 December 2010, Taichung County was merged with Taichung City and Fengyuan was upgraded to a district of the city with Xitun District as the capital of the city.

The restaurant chain KLG has its headquarters in Fengyuan District. In the 1970s, citizens created the Miaodong Night Market (廟東夜市), that is full of Taiwanese street foods.

The district is also home to the Fengyuan Museum of Lacquer Art and the Taichung Municipal City Huludun Cultural Center.

== Transportation ==
=== Rail ===
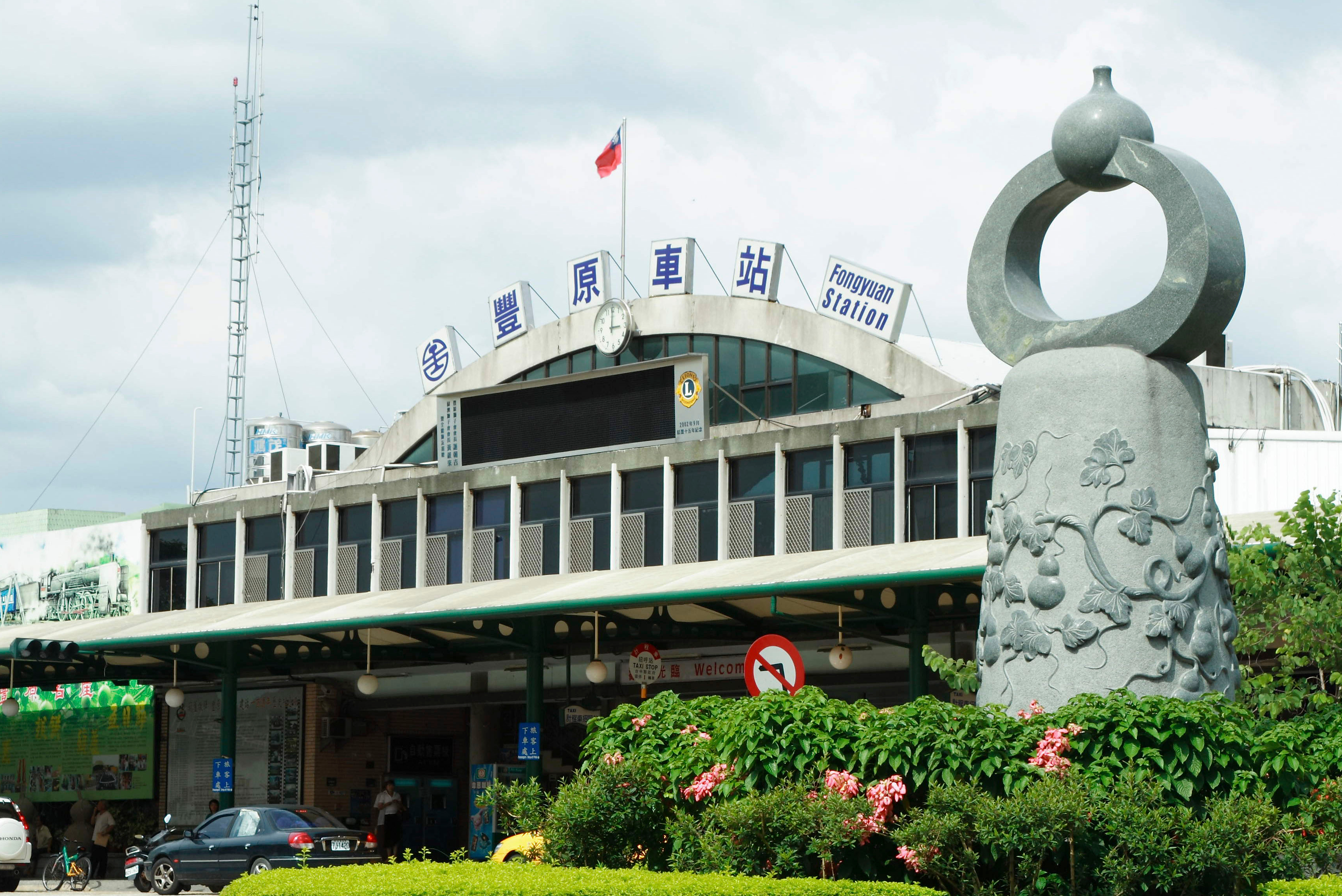
Fengyuan Station

Fengyuan District is accessible from TR Fengyuan Station.

=== Road ===
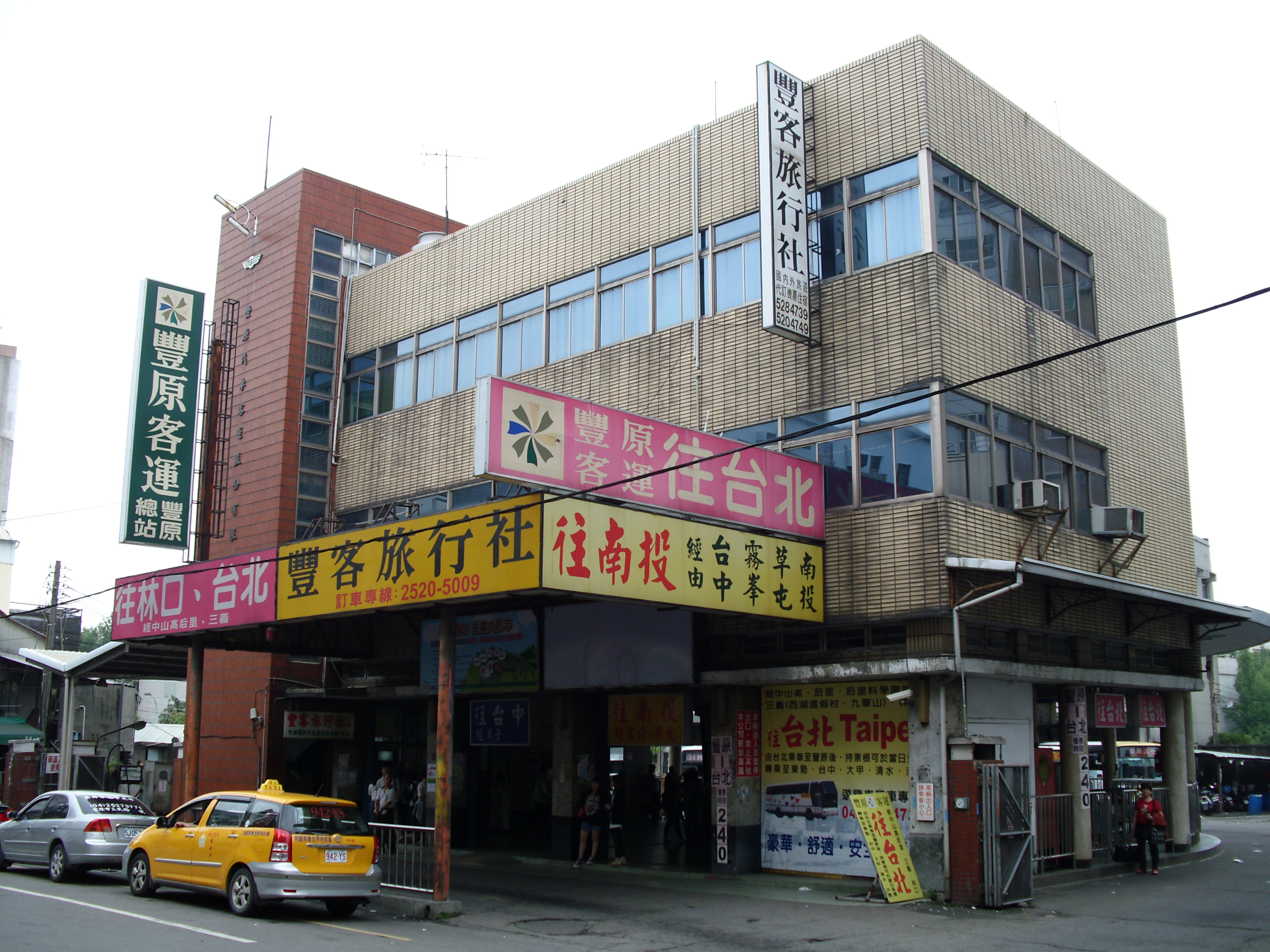
Fengyuan Bus Station

- National Highway No. 1
- National Highway No. 4

== Notable natives ==
- Chang Yu-sheng, pop singer
- Johnny Chiang, Vice President of the Legislative Yuan (2024–)
- Kuan Bi-ling, member of Legislative Yuan (2008–2020)
- Lin Chung-chiu, baseball player
- Liu Fu-hao, baseball player
- Tu Ai-yu, golfer
- Winnie Hsin, pop singer
