= Shigang District =

District of Taichung, Taiwan

Shigang 石岡區 Ishioka
- District
- Shigang District
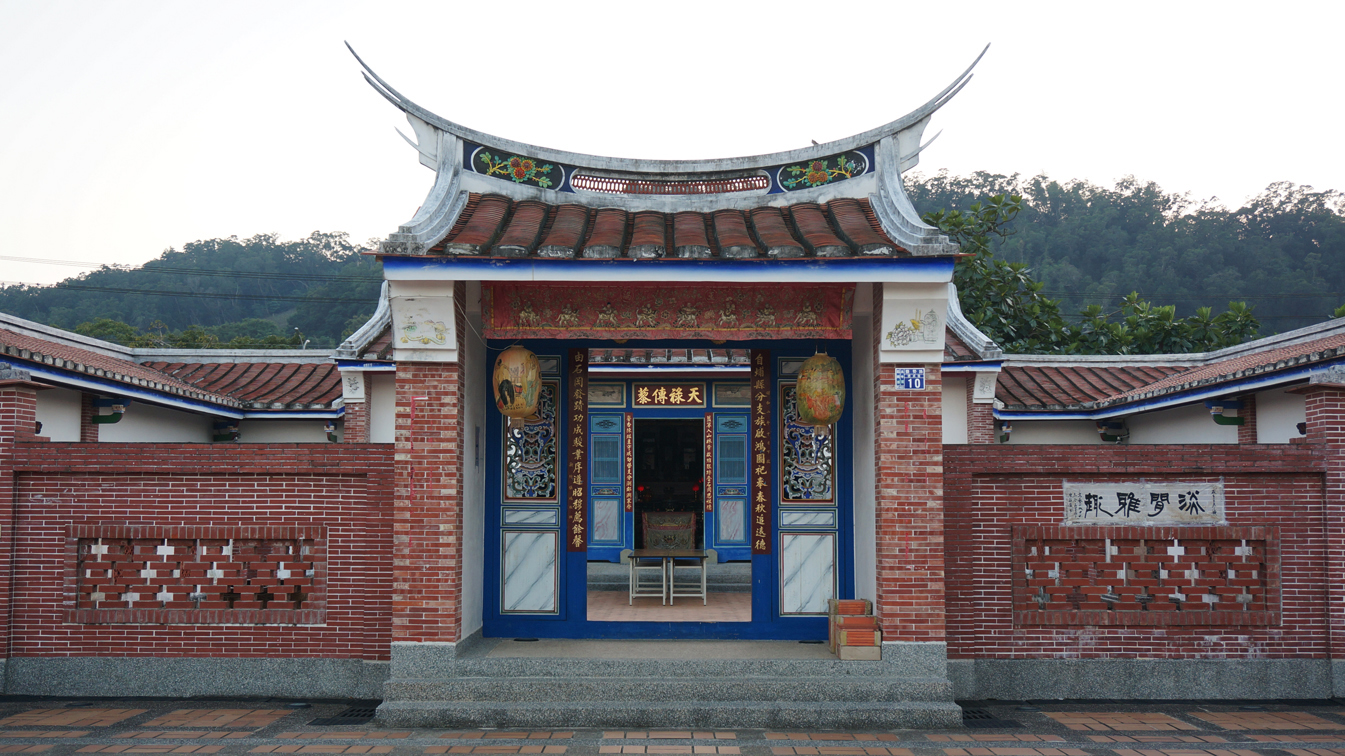
- Tuniu Hakka Cultural Museum

- Location in Taichung City
- Coordinates: 24.266176°N 120.785409°E
- Country: Taiwan
- Special municipality: Taichung
- Established (District): 2010

Area
  - Total: 18.2105 km^{2} (7.0311 sq mi)

Population (February 2023)
  - Total: 14,131
  - Density: 775.98/km^{2} (2,009.8/sq mi)
- Time zone: UTC+8 (CST)
- Website: www.shigang.taichung.gov.tw (in Chinese)

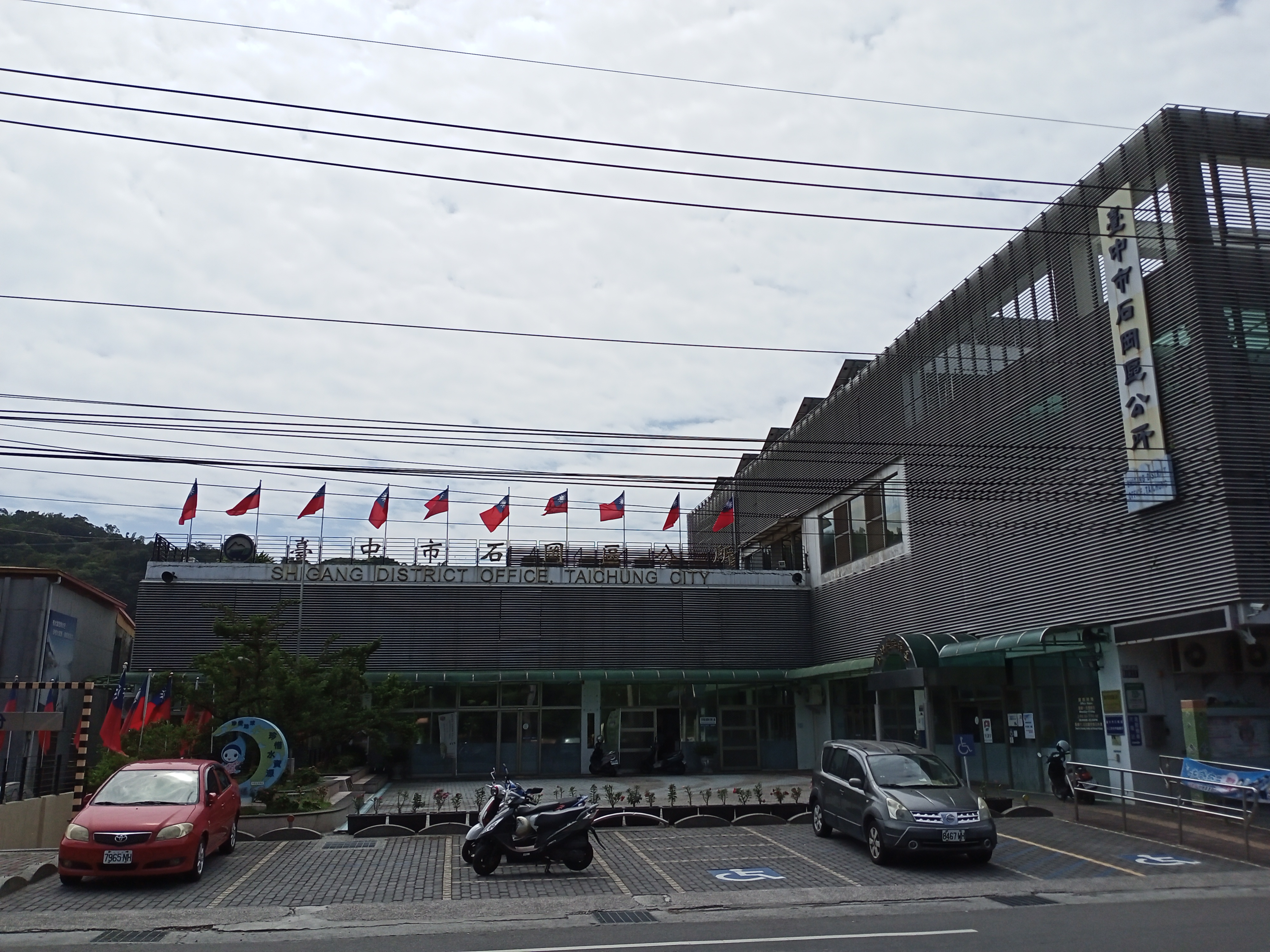
Shigang District Office

Shigang District (Chinese: 石岡區; Hanyu Pinyin: Shígāng Qū; Tongyong Pinyin: Shígang Cyu; Wade–Giles: Shih^{2}-kang^{1} Ch'ü^{1}) is a rural district in Taichung City, Taiwan.

== Geography ==
It has a population total of 14,131 and an area of 18.2105 square kilometres.

== Administrative divisions ==
Shigang, Wanan, Jiufang, Jinxing, Longxing, Wanxing, Meizi, Tuniu, Dexing and Hecheng Village.

== Tourist attractions ==
- Shigang Dam
- Tuniu Hakka Cultural Museum

== See also ==
- Taichung
