= Fengyuan railway station =

Railway station located in Taichung, Taiwan

Fengyuan 豐原
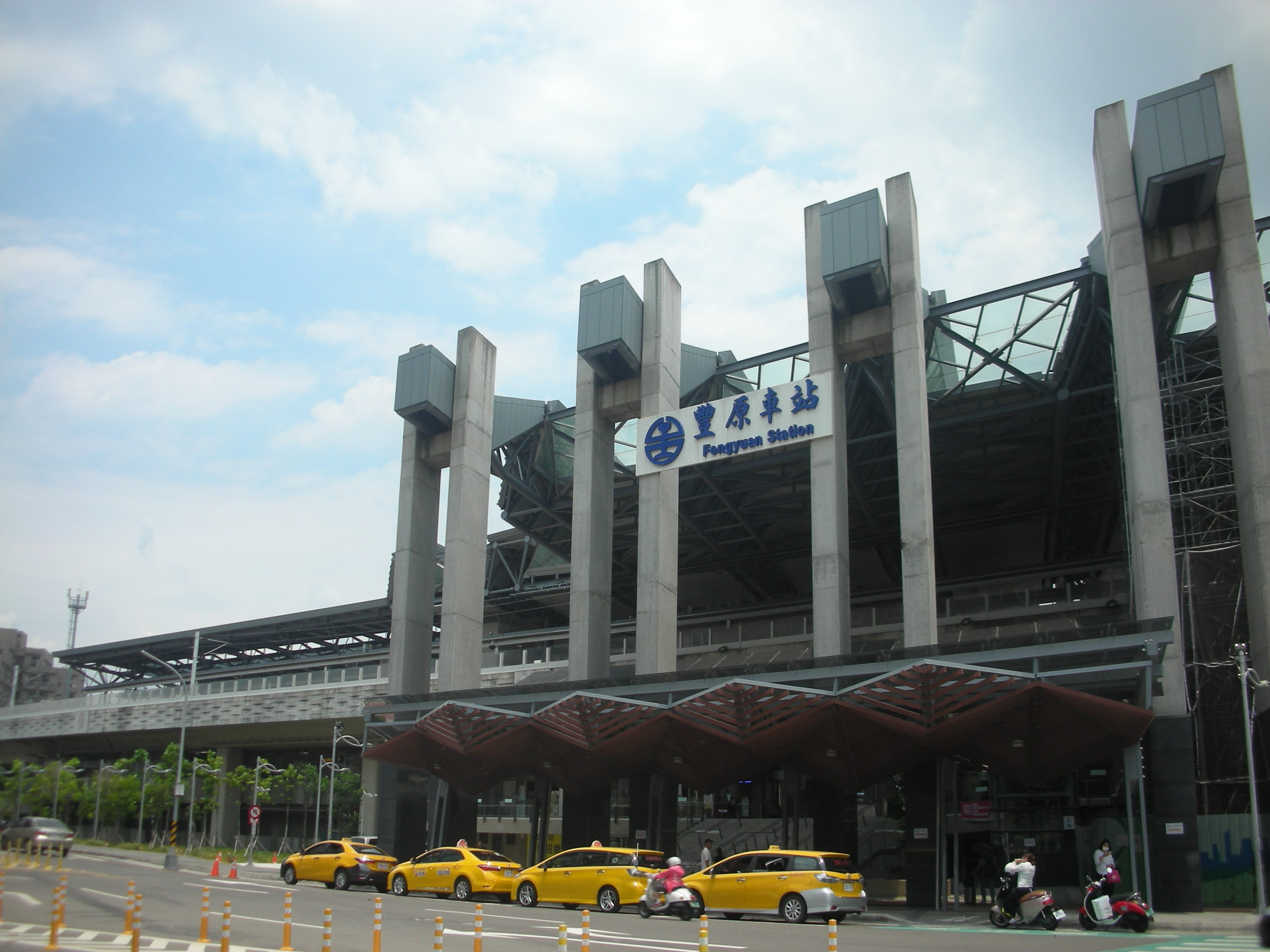
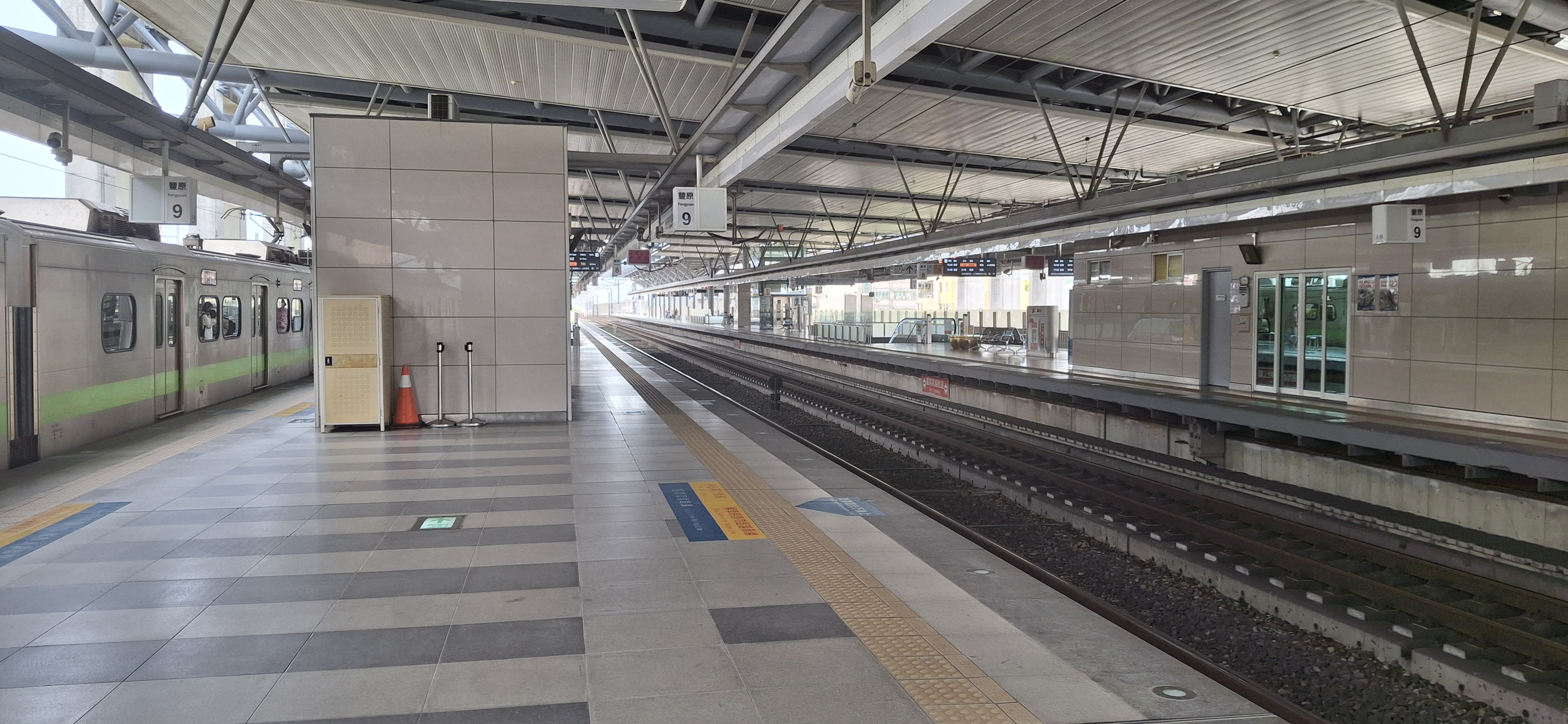

Chinese name
- Traditional Chinese: 豐原
Transcriptions
Standard Mandarin
- Hanyu Pinyin: Fēngyuán
- Bopomofo: ㄈㄥ ㄩㄢˊ

General information
- Location: 1-1 Zhongzheng Rd; Fengyuan District, Taichung; Taiwan
- Coordinates: 24.2542°N 120.7235°E
- System: TRA railway station
- Line: Western Trunk line
- Distance: 179.1 km to Keelung
- Connections: Local bus; Coach

Construction
- Structure type: Elevated

Other information
- Station code: T10 (statistical)
- Classification: First class (Chinese: 一等)
- Website: www.railway.gov.tw/fongyuan/ (in Chinese)

History
- Opened: 1905-05-15
- Rebuilt: 2016-10-16
- Electrified: 1978-10-20

Key dates
- 1960-11: Rebuilt

Passengers
- 2017: 5.974 million per year ▲3.03%
- Rank: 22 out of 228

Services
Preceding station	Taiwan Railway	Following station
Houli towards Keelung	Western Trunk line	Lilin towards Kaohsiung
Location
- Location within Taiwan

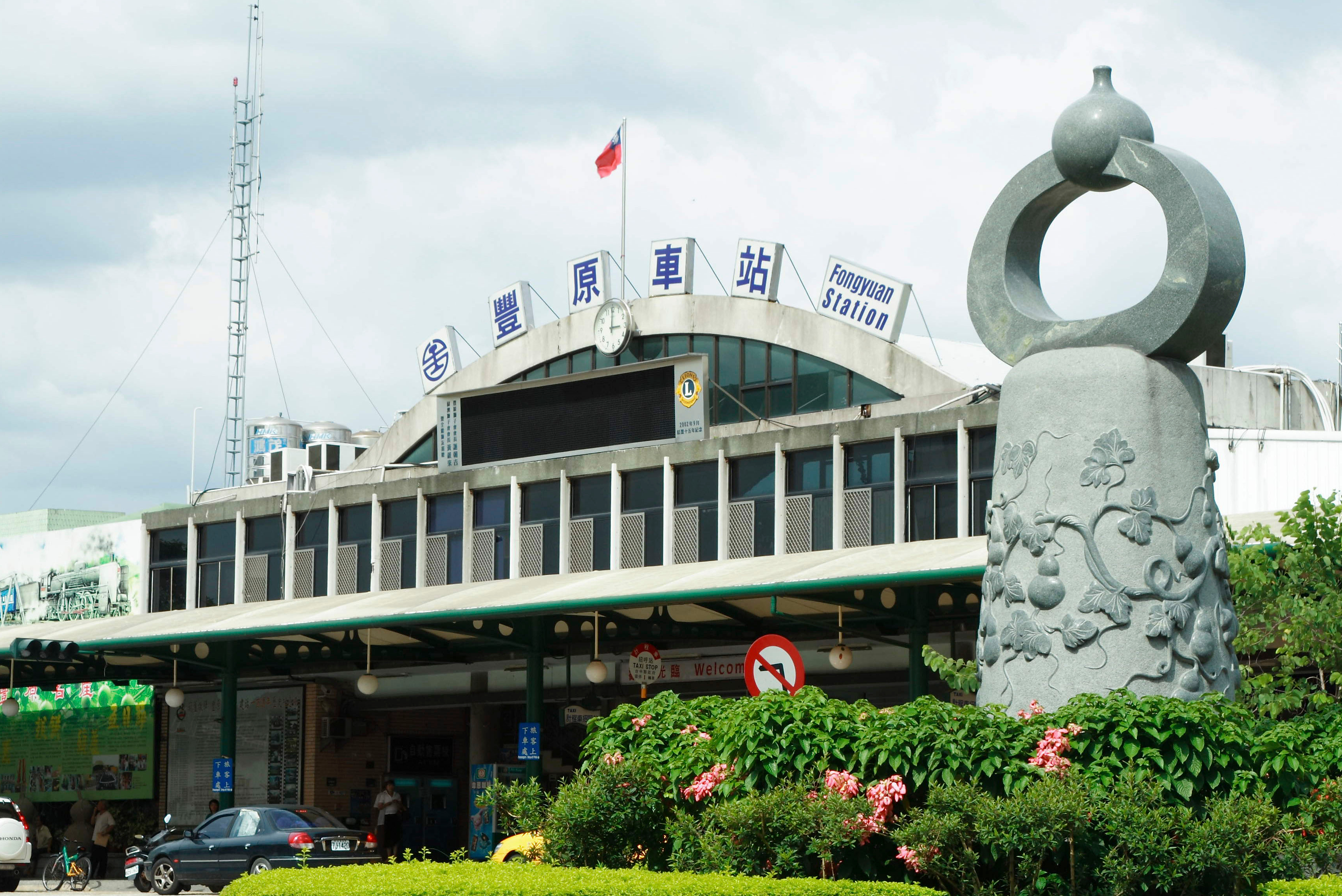
Fengyuan station

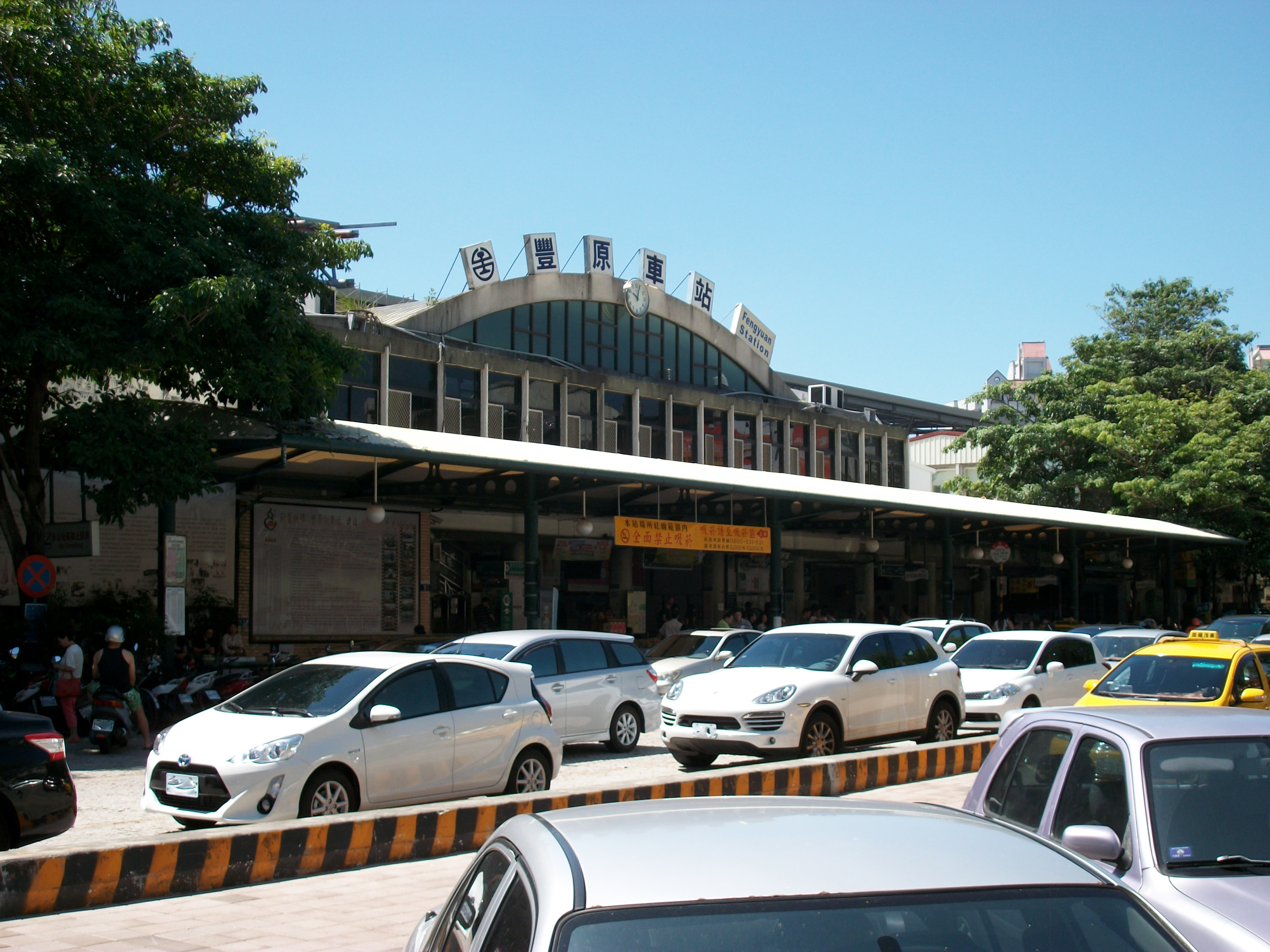
Fengyuan station

Fengyuan (Chinese: 豐原; pinyin: Fēngyuán) is a railway station in Taichung, Taiwan served by Taiwan Railway. It was formerly a terminus for the now-defunct TRA Dongshi line, and is a current terminus for local trains that specifically travel via Taichung railway station, Xinwuri railway station, Taichung Port railway station and Zhunan railway station connecting Taichung line and Coast Line.

== Overview ==
The 1960 station opened with two island platforms. In 2016 it was converted to one side platform, one island platform, and a remaining unused platform.

As part of the Taichung Elevated Railway Project, the station has been replaced with an elevated station with two island platforms.

== History ==
- 1905-05-15: Opened as 葫蘆墩駅.
- 1920: The station name was changed to the current "Fengyuan Station".
- 1959-01-12: The TRA Dongshi line opened for service, with the station as a terminus.
- November 1960: The station was re-constructed as a concrete station building.
- 1991-09-01: The TRA Dongshi line ceased service.
- 2008-02-25: The station became a stop on the Taroko Express.

== Platform layout ==
1	1A	■ West Coast line (northbound)	Toward Hsinchu, Taipei, Qidu, Keelung
1	1A	■ West Coast line (southbound, originating)	Toward Taichung, Changhua, Chiayi
1	1A	■ West Coast line (Coastal line, originating)	Toward Dajia, Zhunan, Hsinchu
2	1B	■ West Coast line (northbound)	Toward Hsinchu, Taipei, Qidu, Keelung
2	1B	■ Eastern line (southbound, cross-line)	Toward Suao, Hualien
3	2A	■ West Coast line (southbound)	Toward Taichung, Tainan, Kaohsiung, Pingtung
3	2A	■ West Coast line (Coastal line, northbound)	Toward Dajia, Zhunan, Hsinchu
4	2B	■ West Coast line (southbound)	Toward Taichung, Changhua, Chiayi
4	2B	■ West Coast line (southbound, originating)	Toward Taichung, Changhua, Chiayi
4	2B	■ South-link line (southbound, originating)	Toward Fangliao, Taitung

== Around the station ==
- Fengyuan Museum of Lacquer Art
- Taichung Municipal City Huludun Cultural Center
- Taiwan Balloons Museum
- Taichung City Government Yangming Building
- National Feng Yuan Commercial High School
- Zhongzheng Rd.
- Sanmin Rd.
- Fengyuan Tzu Chi Temple
- Miaodong Night Market
- Feng Yuan Junior High School
- Taichung Police Department, Fengyuan Branch

== See also ==
- List of railway stations in Taiwan
