= Tang Ying-shen =

Taiwanese Tsou murderer (1967–1987)

- 湯英伸
- Born: July 26, 1967; Wufeng Township, Chiayi County, Taiwan
- Died: May 15, 1987 (aged 19); Taipei City, Taiwan
- Cause of death: Execution by shooting
- Education: National Chiayi Teachers College
- Known for: Youngest death row inmate in Taiwanese history
- Penalty: Death

Details
- Victims: 3
- Date: January 25, 1986
- Country: Taiwan (Republic of China)

Tang Ying-shen (Chinese: 湯英伸; pinyin: Tāng Yīngshēn; July 26, 1967 – May 15, 1987) was a Taiwanese Tsou aborigine who was convicted of murdering his employer's family in 1986 and executed by shooting a year later. At age 19, he was the youngest death row inmate in Taiwanese history. His case brought attention to the discrimination and racism Taiwanese aboriginals faced in society.

== Early life and education ==
Tang Ying-shen was born on July 26, 1967, in the small town of Wufeng (renamed Alishan in 1989), Chiayi, Taiwan. He was reportedly an excellent student, and had good grades. Tang attended Chiayi Teachers College, where he dropped out because he was unable to handle the harsh "military-style" discipline.

== Career ==
In January 1986, Tang moved to Taipei to find work. He eventually found a job at a laundry shop, where he worked up to 17 hours a day without a day off, and only had daily salary of NT$200. Tang's employer also mistreated him by confiscating his ID card and refusing to let him go home for the Chinese New Year, He often called Tang a huan-a, a derogatory Hokkien term for indigenous people.

=== Murders ===
On January 24, 1986, a day before the murders, Tang asked his employer for a resignation. However, he refused his resignation. On January 25, he woke Tang up in the middle of the night, forcing him to work overtime. Tang then got into a scuffle with him over the matter. In a fit of rage, Tang beat his employer to death with a crowbar. His employer's wife came into the room, hearing the commotion, but she was also beaten with the crowbar. Afterwards, Tang heard their two-year-old daughter crying in the bedroom. In a panic, he threw the daughter onto the ground, killing her. After the crimes were committed, Tang took his confiscated ID card, surrendered himself to a police station, and was charged with homicide.

== Trial and execution ==
Tang was sentenced to death on the first trial, however, the case attracted a lot of attention. More than 100 religious, civic, and cultural groups in Taiwan called for the government and President Chiang Ching-kuo to commute Tang's death sentence to life imprisonment.

However, Tang's death penalty was confirmed on May 9, 1987, and he was executed by shooting six days later on May 15. He refused anesthesia for the execution, saying that "I deserve this for what I did, so I must accept this pain".

== Impact and legacy ==
Tang's trial and execution brought light to the discrimination faced by the indigenous Taiwanese in society, which coincided with the lifting of martial law and increased discussion on human rights in Taiwan. The Wu Feng legend, about a Qing merchant who befriended and "civilized" aborigines, was also questioned for its racist implications. Wu Feng statues were demolished across the country, and Tang's hometown Wufeng, named after the merchant, was renamed to the current Alishan Township in 1989.

In 2023, the case reappeared in the spotlight following the release of the drama series Port of Lies, which is based on the Tang Ying-shen incident.
