= Sisters Lake =

Lake in Alishan, Chiayi County, Taiwan

- 姊妹潭 (Chinese)
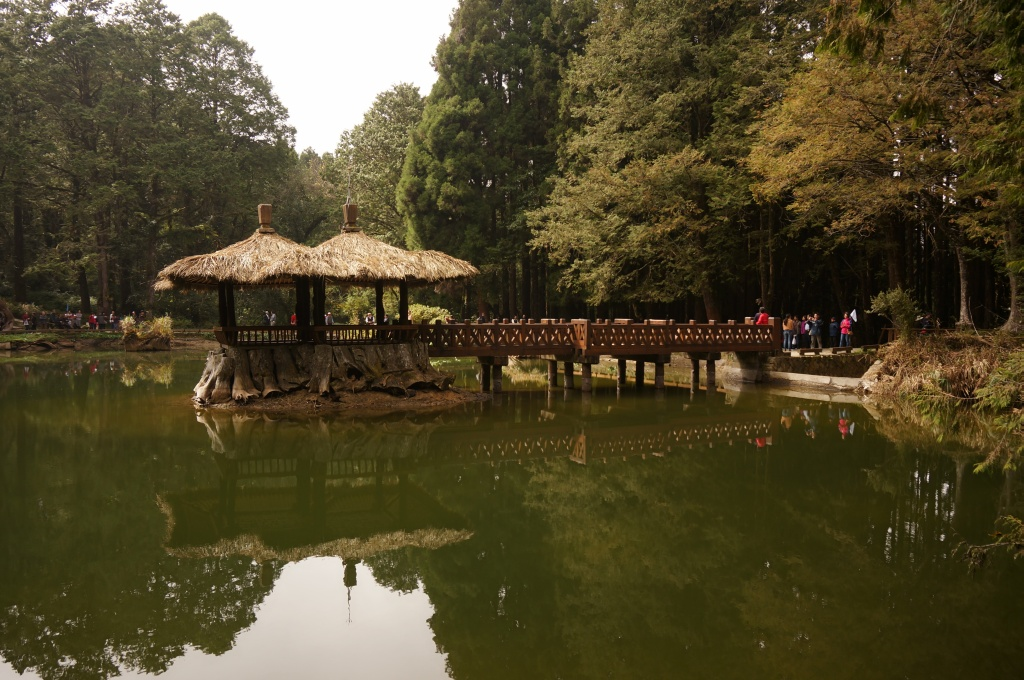

- Location within Chiayi County
- Location: Alishan, Chiayi County, Taiwan
- Coordinates: 23°31′08.4″N 120°48′51.3″E
- Type: lake
- Surface elevation: 2,100 meters (6,900 ft)

Sisters Lake (Chinese: 姊妹潭; pinyin: Zǐmèi Tán) is a lake in Alishan National Scenic Area, Alishan Township, Chiayi County, Taiwan.

== Name ==
The lake is named Sisters because it was said there used to be two Taiwanese indigenous women of the Tsou tribe who committed suicide here because they could not find love.

== History ==
The lake was dried out in 2002 due to prolonged draught season.

== Geology ==
The lake is located at an altitude of 2,100 meters. The lake consists of two lakes, which are named Elder Sister Lake and Younger Sister Lake. Elder Sister Lake is the larger of the two lakes with a surface area of 530 m^{2}. It has a shape of rectangular and it consists of two wooden pavilions built from Taxodium distichum. The Younger Sister Lake is the smaller of the two, with a surface area of 66 m^{2}. Both lakes are separated by around 50 meters in distance.

== Architecture ==
The two lakes are encircled by a 180 meter long foot path.

== See also ==
- Geography of Taiwan
- List of lakes of Taiwan
