= Alishan National Scenic Area =

Mountain resort and nature reserve in Taiwan

Coordinates: 23°31′N 120°48′E

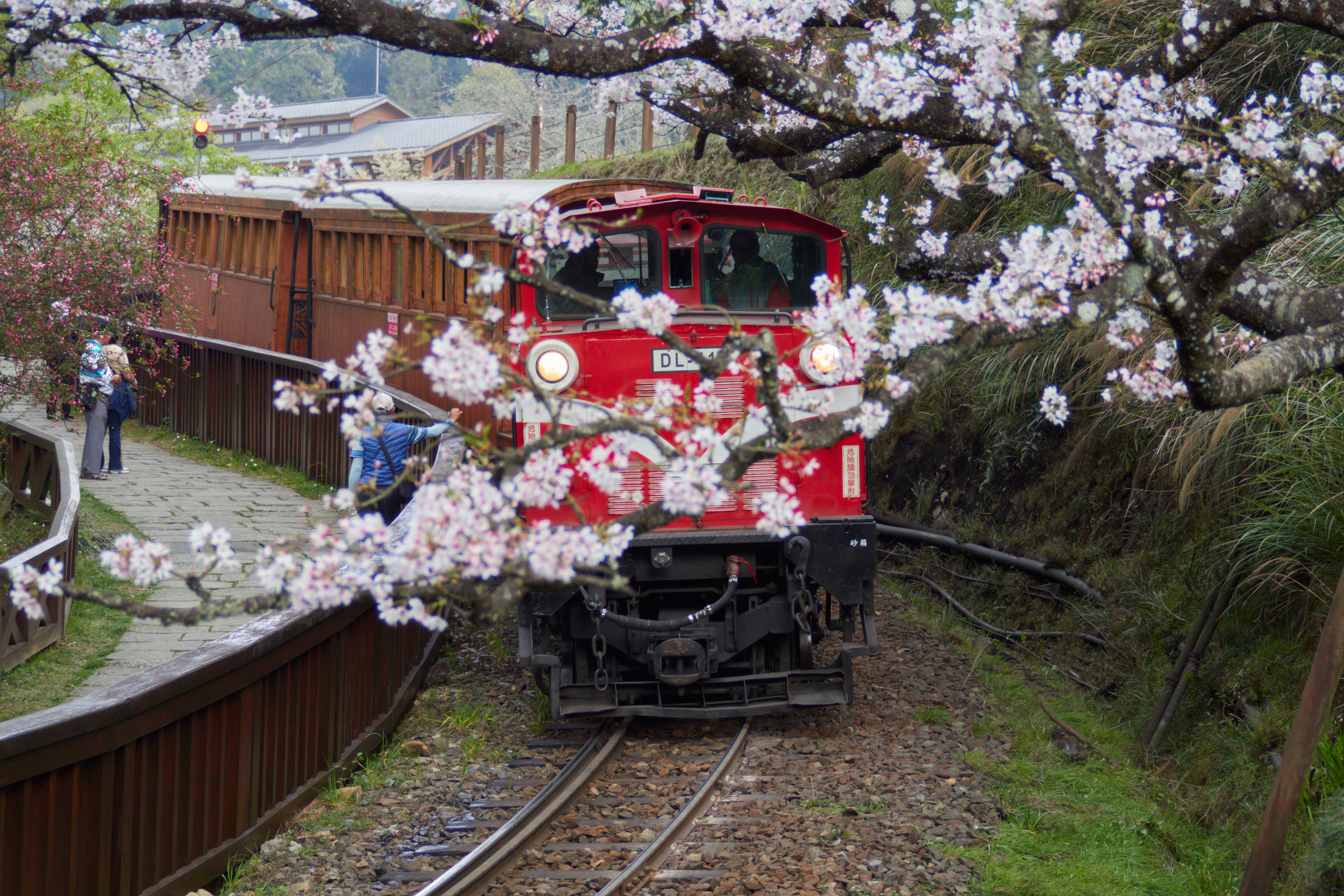
- Chinese: 阿里山國家風景區
Transcriptions
Standard Mandarin
- Hanyu Pinyin: Ālǐshān Guójiā Fēngjǐng Qū
- Gwoyeu Romatzyh: Aliishan Gwojia Fengjiing Chiu
Southern Min
- Hokkien POJ: A-lí-san Kok-ka Hong-kéng-khu

The Alishan National Scenic Area is a mountain resort and nature reserve located in Alishan township, Chiayi County, Taiwan.

== Geography ==
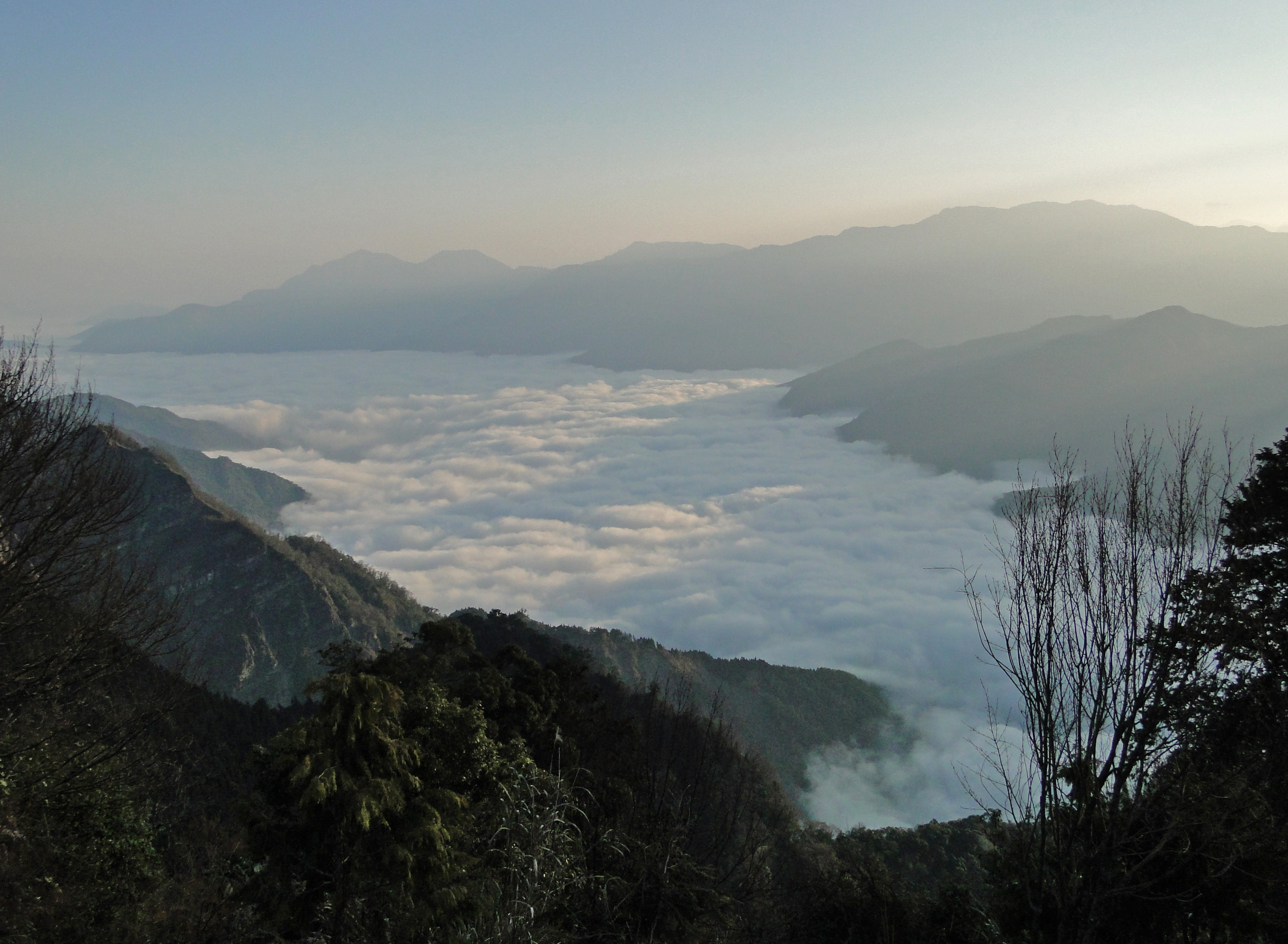
View from Alishan

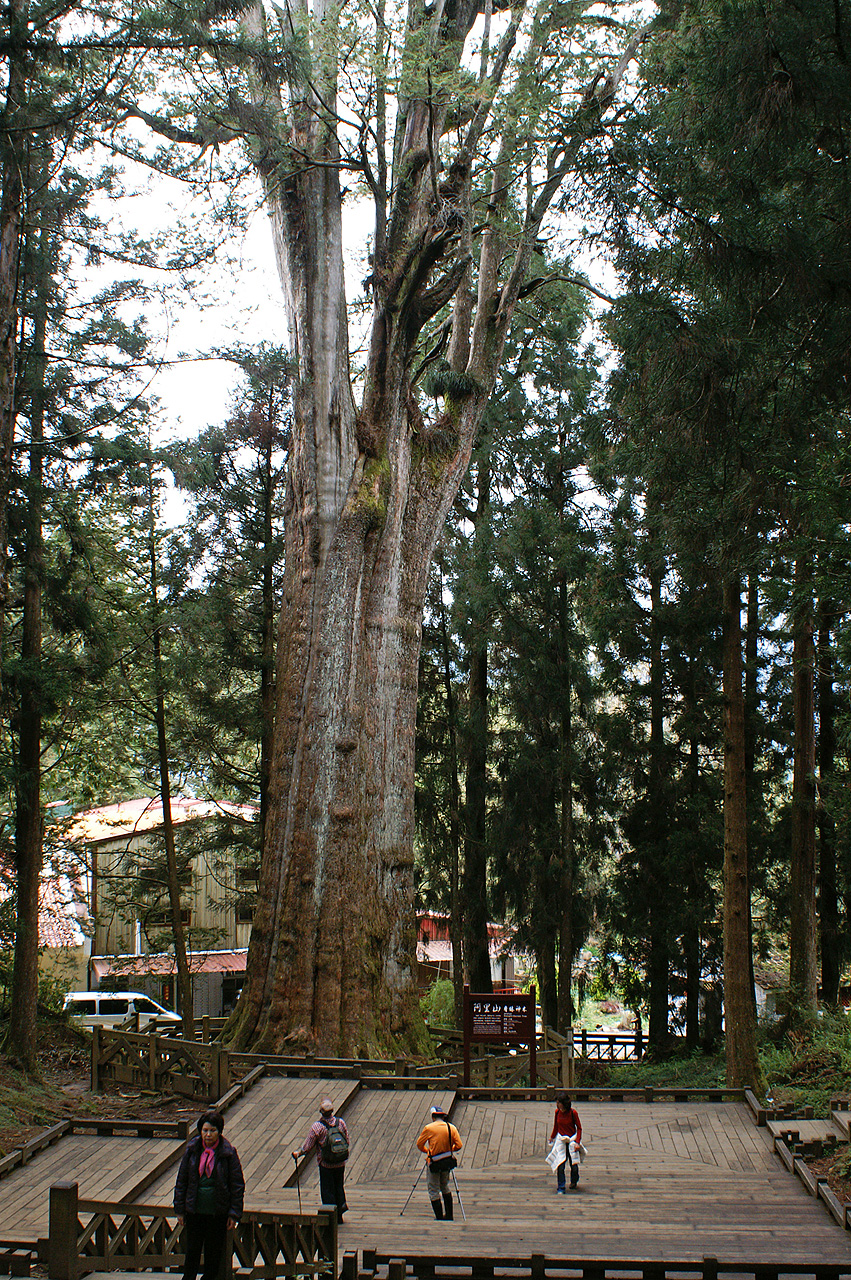
Formosan cypress

Alishan is 415 square kilometres (41,500 ha) in area. Notable characteristics include mountain wilderness, four villages, waterfalls, high altitude tea plantations, the Alishan Forest Railway, and a number of hiking trails. The area is popular with tourists and mountain climbers. Alishan, itself has become one of the major landmarks associated with Taiwan. The area is famous for its production of high mountain tea and wasabi.

Alishan is well known for its sunrises, sunsets, and views of a sea of clouds in the area between Alishan and Yüshan, railway station, and sacred trees. Alishan, along with Taroko Gorge and Sun Moon Lake, is one of Taiwan's most popular scenic attractions.

== Climate ==
Alishan National Scenic Area spans a broad range in altitude. Lower elevations, such as in Leye Township, share the same subtropical and tropical climate as the rest of southern Taiwan, while the climate changes to temperate and alpine as the elevation increases. Snow sometimes falls at higher elevations in the winter. Alishan is located at an altitude of 1400 to 2600 meters. The average annual temperature is about 10 degrees Celsius, coupled with abundant rainfall.

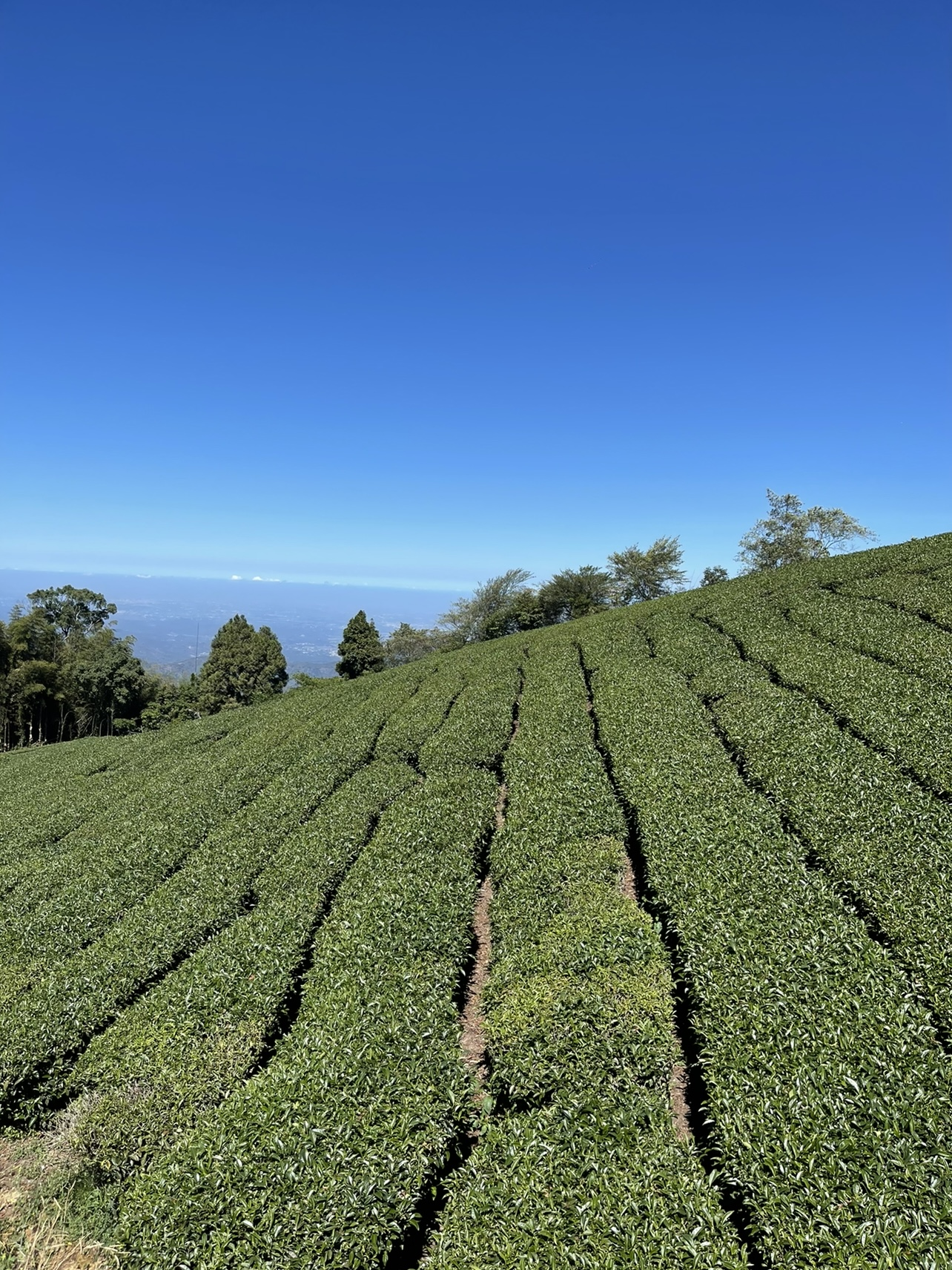
Growing Alishan High Mountain Tea

Average temperatures are moderate:

- Low elevations: 24 °C in the summer, 16 °C in the winter.
- Medium elevations: 19 °C in the summer, 12 °C in the winter.
- High elevations: 14 °C in the summer, 5 °C in the winter.

Climate data for Alishan, elevation 2,413 m (7,917 ft), (1991–2020 normals, extremes 1933–present）
Month	Jan	Feb	Mar	Apr	May	Jun	Jul	Aug	Sep	Oct	Nov	Dec	Year
Record high °C (°F)	20.4 (68.7)	21.3 (70.3)	21.7 (71.1)	23.6 (74.5)	23.0 (73.4)	25.5 (77.9)	24.9 (76.8)	24.3 (75.7)	25.2 (77.4)	23.6 (74.5)	23.2 (73.8)	20.8 (69.4)	25.5 (77.9)
Mean daily maximum °C (°F)	11.0 (51.8)	11.7 (53.1)	13.9 (57.0)	15.7 (60.3)	17.2 (63.0)	18.4 (65.1)	19.3 (66.7)	18.8 (65.8)	18.5 (65.3)	17.4 (63.3)	15.6 (60.1)	12.6 (54.7)	15.8 (60.5)
Daily mean °C (°F)	6.5 (43.7)	7.3 (45.1)	9.5 (49.1)	11.5 (52.7)	13.1 (55.6)	14.4 (57.9)	14.7 (58.5)	14.6 (58.3)	14.0 (57.2)	12.4 (54.3)	10.7 (51.3)	8.0 (46.4)	11.4 (52.5)
Mean daily minimum °C (°F)	3.1 (37.6)	4.1 (39.4)	6.1 (43.0)	8.4 (47.1)	10.2 (50.4)	11.6 (52.9)	11.6 (52.9)	11.7 (53.1)	11.0 (51.8)	9.1 (48.4)	7.4 (45.3)	4.6 (40.3)	8.2 (46.8)
Record low °C (°F)	−11.5 (11.3)	−8.5 (16.7)	−7.0 (19.4)	−5.5 (22.1)	0.7 (33.3)	0.0 (32.0)	5.6 (42.1)	4.0 (39.2)	−0.8 (30.6)	−5.2 (22.6)	−5.0 (23.0)	−8.0 (17.6)	−11.5 (11.3)
Average precipitation mm (inches)	86.8 (3.42)	109.9 (4.33)	146.6 (5.77)	223.9 (8.81)	510.4 (20.09)	674.7 (26.56)	694.7 (27.35)	813.1 (32.01)	402.7 (15.85)	141.2 (5.56)	66.9 (2.63)	69.7 (2.74)	3,940.6 (155.12)
Average precipitation days (≥ 0.1 mm)	7.9	8.3	9.8	12.5	19.3	19.7	21.0	22.6	16.8	9.2	6.6	7.4	161.1
Average relative humidity (%)	80.6	83.4	81.4	84.0	89.2	89.5	91.1	92.2	91.3	86.9	82.4	80.6	86.1
Mean monthly sunshine hours	149.2	120.6	138.0	120.9	103.2	108.0	118.1	102.0	105.2	135.6	143.3	148.3	1,492.4
Source: Central Weather Bureau

== Topography ==
Alishan is mountainous:

- Number of peaks above 2000 meters: 25
- Highest point: Da Ta Shan (大塔山), 2,663 meters.
- Average height of Alishan Mountain Range: 2,500 meters.

== Vegetation and wildlife ==
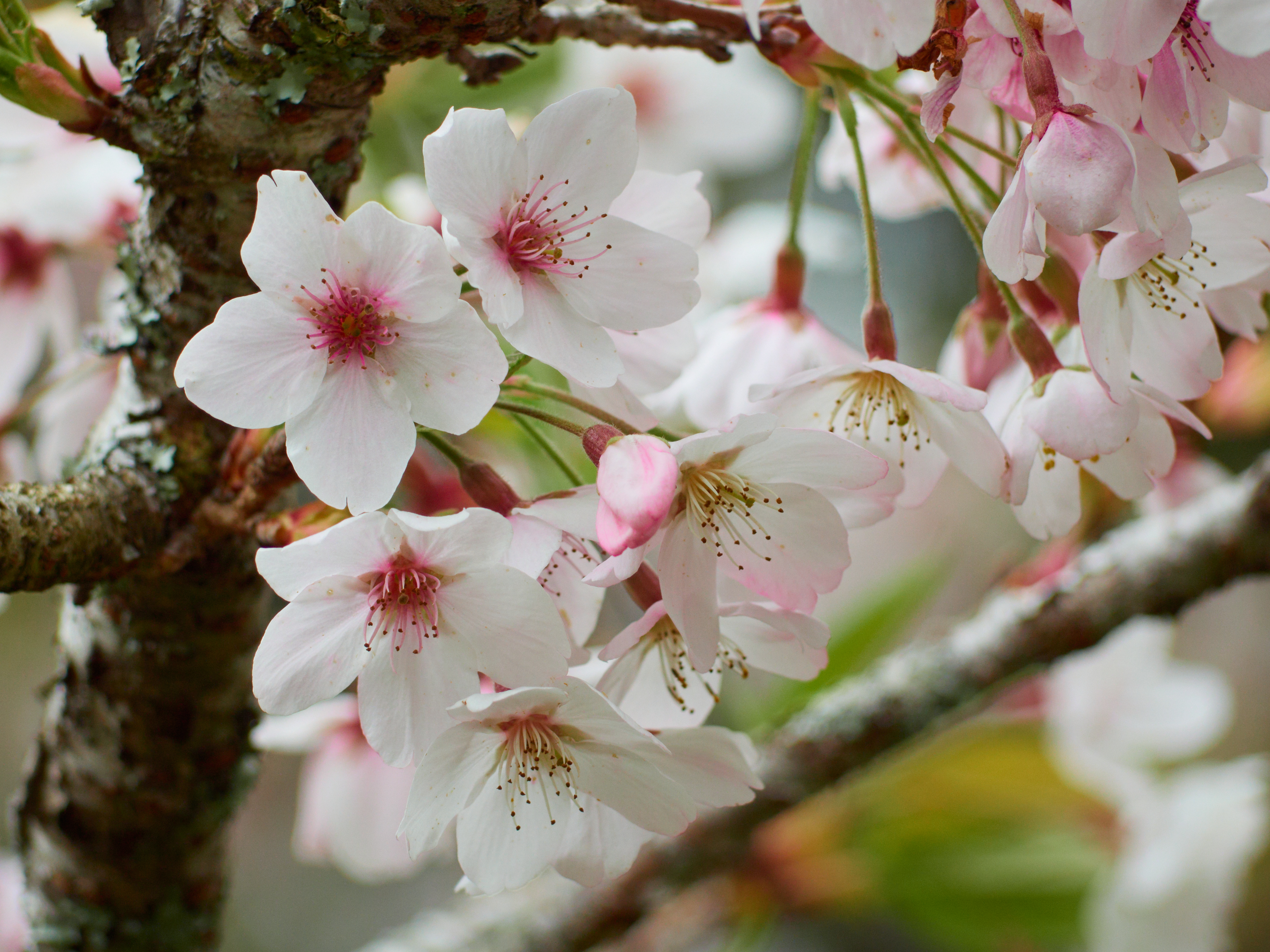
Cherry blossoms (Prunus sp.) in bloom on a tree at Alishan.

Important trees in the area include:

- Taiwania cryptomerioides, a large coniferous tree in the cypress family Cupressaceae (the same family as the next three species)
- Chamaecyparis formosensis, or Formosan Cypress
- Chamaecyparis taiwanensis
- Cunninghamia konishii
- Pinus taiwanensis, or Taiwan Red Pine
- Picea morrisonicola, or Yüshan Spruce
- Pseudotsuga sinensis var. wilsoniana, or Taiwan Douglas-fir
- Abies kawakamii, a species of conifer in the family Pinaceae, only found in Taiwan
- Tsuga chinensis var. formosana, Taiwan or Chinese Hemlock
- Ulmus uyematsui, a species of elm only found in the Alishan region

=== Sacred Trees ===
In 1906, the Japanese discovered a red cypress tree that was over 3000 years old, located next to the Alishan Forest Railway's Sacred Tree Station. The Japanese honored it as the "Sacred Tree". The tree is 52 meters (171 ft) tall with a trunk diameter of nearly 5 meters (16 ft), making it one of the largest giant trees in Alishan.

The Alishan sacred tree withered due to lightning and heavy rain. It was put down in 1998 for tourists to visit. In 2006, the Chiayi County Government and the Alishan Scenic Area Administration started a voting activity to select other sacred trees as the new landmark in the scenic area. The 45-meter (148 ft) tall, 2,300-year-old Xianglin Giant Tree received the highest number of votes and became the second generation of sacred tree.

The Giant trees are later organized and a trail is built for visitors to enter, where they can see more than 38 giant trees, most of which are hundreds of years old.

== History ==
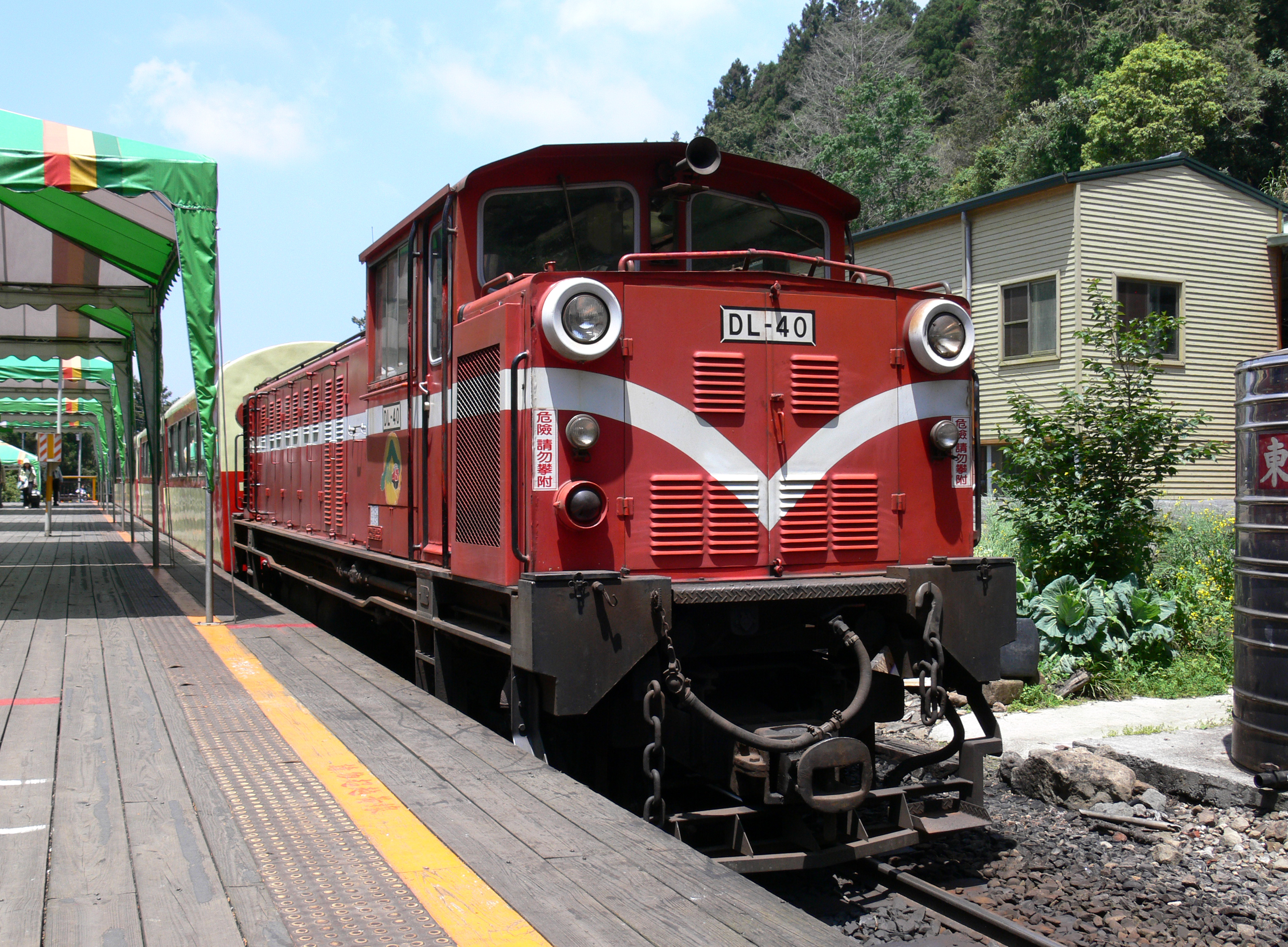
A Japanese-built train on the Alishan Forest Railway.

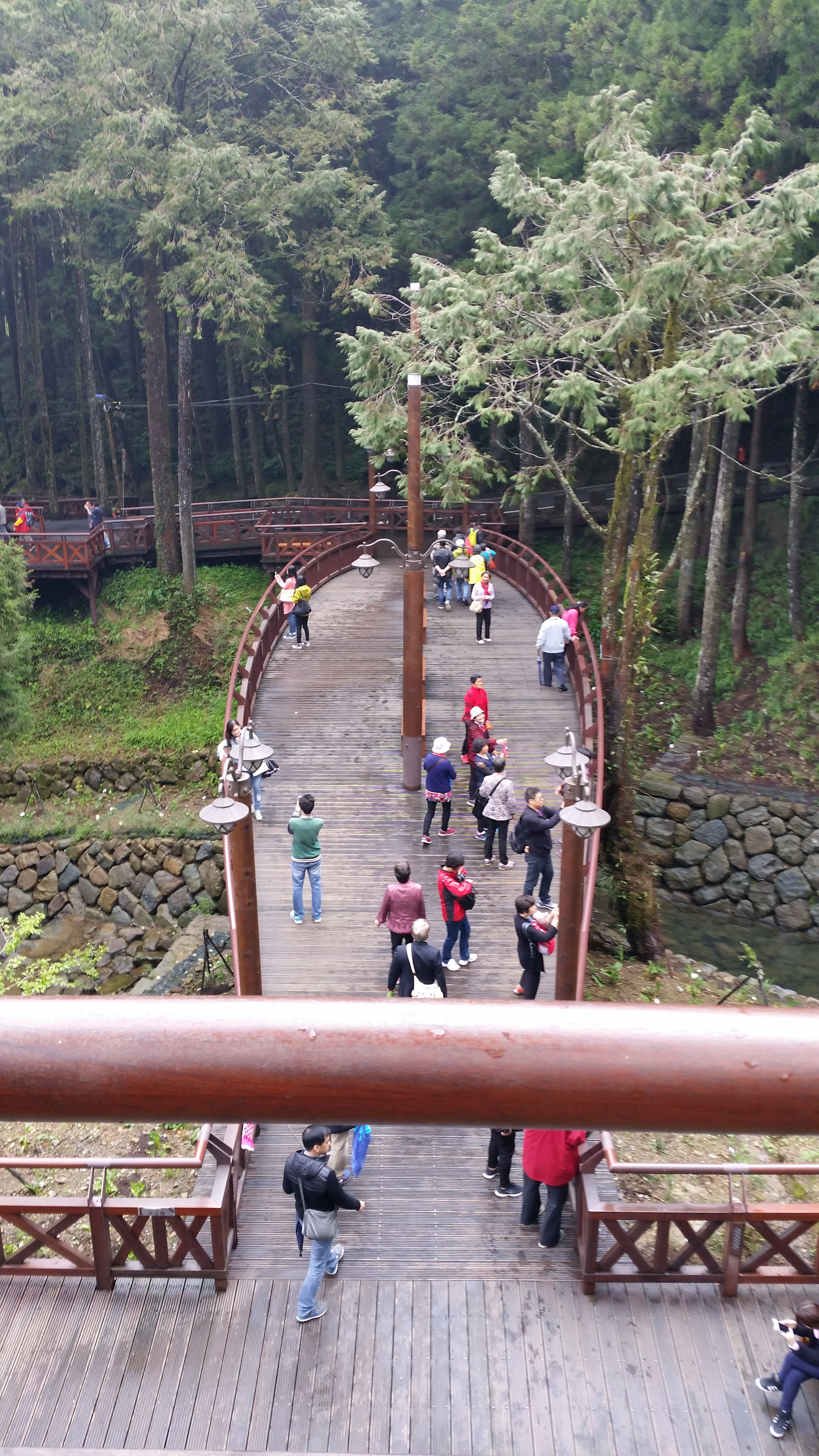
Boardwalk at Alishan National Scenic Area

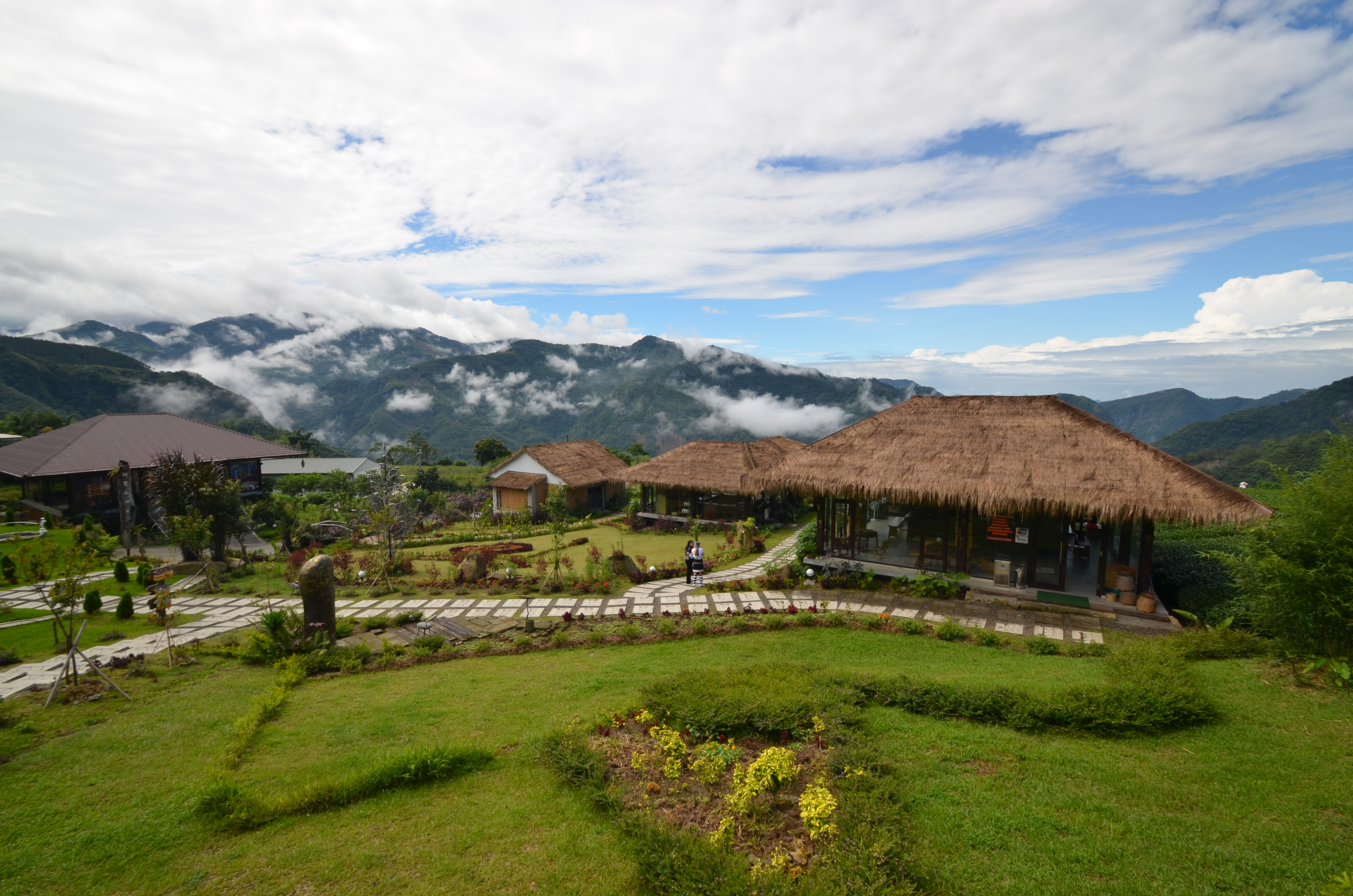
Tsou Cultural Park

The Alishan area was originally settled by the Tsou tribe of the Taiwanese aborigines; the name derives from the aboriginal word Jarissang. Ethnic Han Chinese settlers first settled on the plains near modern-day Chiayi as early as the late Ming Dynasty (around the mid-17th century), but did not move into the mountains until the late 18th century, establishing the towns of Ruili (瑞里), Ruifeng (瑞峰), Xiding (隙頂), and Fenqihu (奮起湖). The resulting armed clashes between the settlers and the aborigines pushed the aborigines even further into the mountains.

Following the cession of Taiwan to Japan at the end of the First Sino-Japanese War, Japanese expeditions to the area found large quantities of cypress (檜木, or hinoki in Japanese). This led to the development of the logging industry in the area and the export of local cypress and Taiwania wood. A series of narrow-gauge railways were built in the area during this time to facilitate the transportation of lumber from the mountains to the plains below, part of which continues to operate as the Alishan Forest Railway. Several new villages also began to sprout up along the railway lines. It was also during this time that the first tourists began to visit the area. Plans were even drawn up to incorporate the area into the new Niitaka (New Highest) Arisan National Park (新高阿里山国立公園).

With the exhaustion of forest resources by the 1970s, domestic and international tourism overtook logging to become the primary economic activity in the area. The tourism industry continued to expand with the completion of the Alishan highway in the 1980s, displacing the railroad as the primary mode of transportation up the mountain. To combat the problems associated with the growing crowds of tourists and the expanding high mountain tea and wasabi plantations, the area was declared a national scenic area in 2001. The area covers the Alishan Forest Recreation Area and the Han Chinese villages of Ruili, Fengshan (豐山), and Taihe (太和), as well as the Tsou people of Dabang (達邦), Shanmei (山美), and Chashan (茶山), and the administrative area spans four townships, including Meishan Township, Zhuqi Township, Fanlu Township, and Alishan Township.

On 1 December 2014, fire broke out at Alishan spreading over more than 5 hectares of land. The area affected was located near Tapang No. 3 Bridge. The fire was believed to happen due to dry ground which was vulnerable to fire because of the absence of rain in the area for months.

== Tourists ==
In October 2014, The Chiayi Forestry Administration pointed out that the park's facilities have been improved to create an aesthetic forest atmosphere, and the Alishan Highway is relatively undamaged, which in turn has improved the quality of recreation, attracting more than 2.08 million visitors to Alishan this year.

In order to provide a more comfortable recreation experience for visitors, the Chiayi Forestry Administration has completed reconstructions such as the separation of pedestrian and vehicular roads, the improvement of facilities at the Visitor Service Center, and the constructions of the landscape around the Alishan sacred tree, etc. The successful project has a positive force for the peaking tourists numbers in 2014.

Since August 2019, China has imposed a ban on the free flow of Chinese visitors and subsequently increased the number of tour groups, which has impacted the entire tourism industry in Taiwan. The number of visitors decreased by 49.8%, and the number of Chinese visitors also decreased from 1.76 million in 2014 to 420,000, a big drop of 76%. From 2017 to 2019, there will be 1,093,896, 952,418, and 900,1441 national visitors, 594,158, 428,884, and 419,712 Chinese tourists, and 60,292, 63,744, and 65,481 foreign visitors, respectively. The number of foreign visitors has increased by 8.6%.

The Chiayi Forestry Administration Office stated that tourists numbers was affected by the COVID-19 epidemic in 2020. There were only 99,7052 tourists, the lowest in 10 years, compared with the highest number of tourists which is 2.76 million in 2014. Through the outbreak of COVID-19 in May 2021, Alishan National Scenic Area has announced its closure under the tier three Covid restriction.

Table of Tourists In Ten Years
	January	February	March	April	May	June	July	August	September	October	November	December	Total
2011	78,543	124,644	191,304	224,808	83,187	71,773	78,022	83,471	70,801	122,705	149,394	146,334	1,424,986
2012	134,498	158,728	371,005	254,842	183,801	87,996	180,708	44,373	111,837	173,934	191,068	188,021	2,080,811
2013	150,852	186,552	298,672	230,723	140,853	138,049	146,244	145,546	134,402	143,538	172,775	175,360	2,063,566
2014	170,203	226,561	388,798	290,910	202,715	205,603	212,549	199,884	176,049	225,527	232,939	229,741	2,761,479
2015	227,846	255,509	301,224	262,628	215,738	195,536	219,009	183,322	166,287	231,109	237,990	217,153	2,713,351
2016	204,430	238,182	329,911	275,817	200,809	157,977	184,713	153,521	82,872	123,163	137,756	153,521	2,242,672
2017	149,995	158,169	246,902	179,011	117,732	73,982	126,419	148,866	99,700	141,936	140,424	146,276	1,748,346
2018	104,508	126,051	221,875	178,918	102,682	87,411	105,540	103,696	75,589	108,472	103,912	126,392	1,445,046
2019	99,088	135,638	247,897	164,068	84,378	100,460	122,968	87,437	66,650	91,963	93,447	91,778	1,386,634
2020	76,019	88,589	123,528	36,318	28,431	63,881	107,941	119,246	78,911	105,144	82,706	87,492	868,852

== Attractions and landmarks ==
Fenqihu (奮起湖) is a small town of low wooden buildings built into the mountainside at 1,400 meters, midpoint of the Alishan Forest Railway. It is famous for natural rock formations, mountain streams, forests, and the ruins of a Shinto temple in the vicinity, as well as for its production of high altitude food products such as bamboo shoots and aiyu jelly (愛玉). The local box lunches (奮起湖便當, Fenqihu bento) are known across Taiwan and are sold from stalls at the train station and from Fenqihu Hotel on the Fenqihu Old Street. For many years, Fenqihu was the terminal end of the Alishan Forest Railway line from Chiayi to Alishan, since the railway was heavily damaged by Typhoon Morakot in 2009 and only the Chiayi to Fenqihu portion was reopened in 2014. The rest of the line upslope of Fenqihu reopened in 2024.

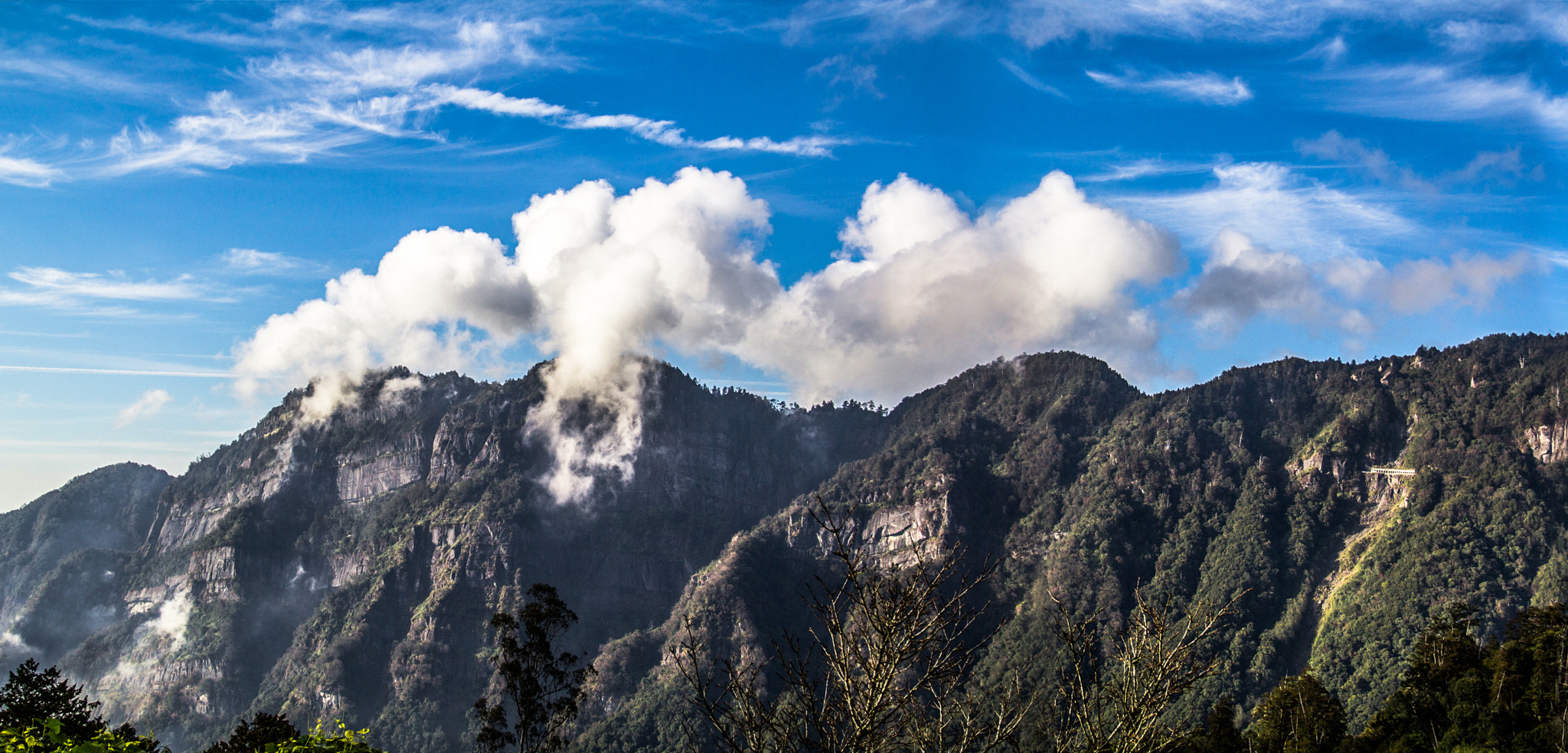
View of Datashan (大塔山)

Datashan (大塔山), with an elevation of 2,662 meters, is one of the highest peaks in the Alishan mountain range.

== See also ==
- National parks of Taiwan
- Alishan Range
- List of tourist attractions in Taiwan
