= YuYuPas Tsou cultural tribe park =

Park in Taiwan

Coordinates: 23.4628°N 120.6988°E

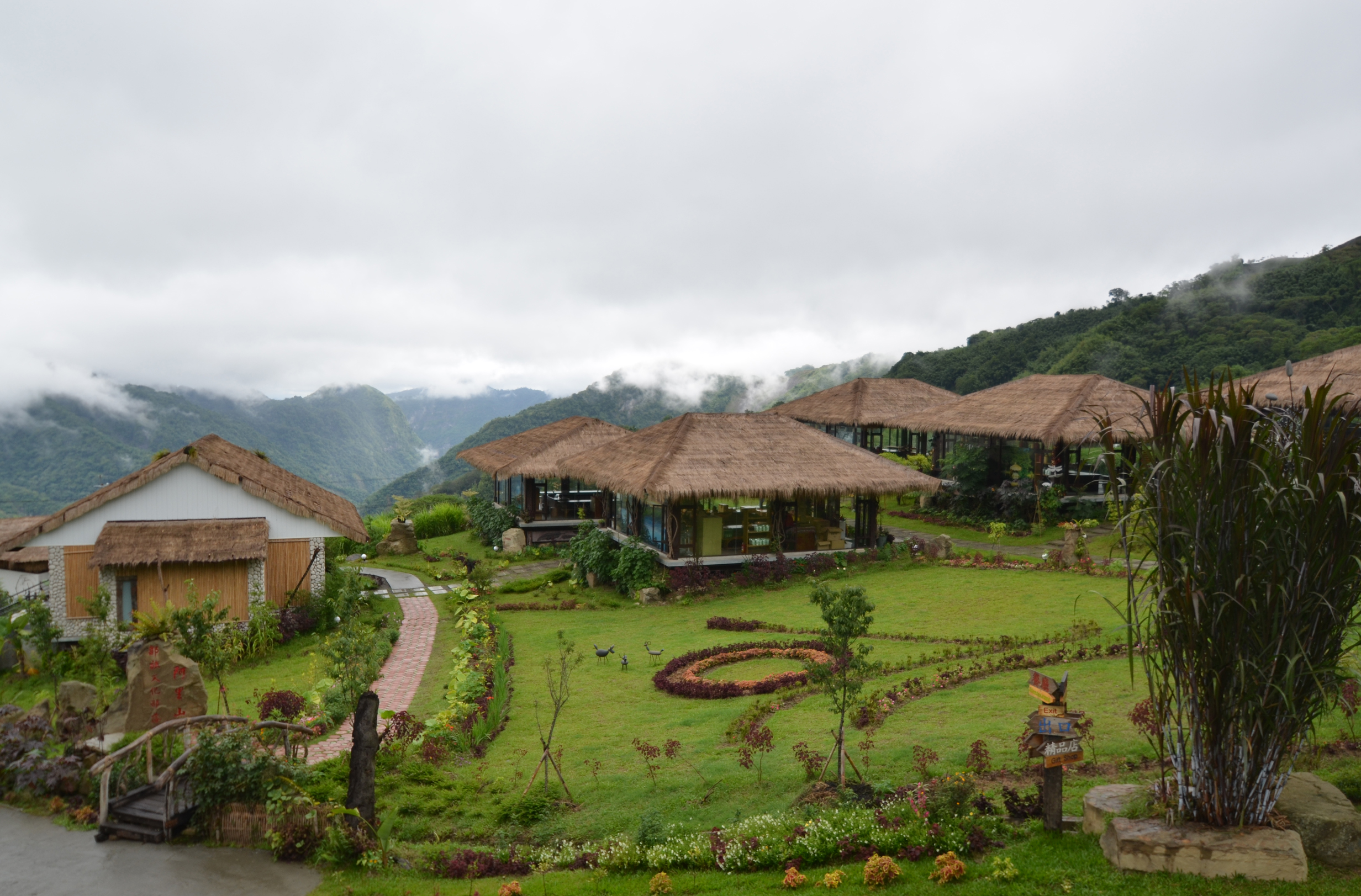
YuYuPas Tsou Cultural Tribe Park

The YuYuPas Tsou Cultural Tribe Park (Chinese: 優游吧斯鄒族文化部) is a tourist attraction located at about 1,200 meters above sea level in the mountainous Alishan area of Chiayi County, Taiwan. Originating from the Tsou language, YuYuPas means "very rich." It covers an area of roughly two hectares and is surrounded by extensive tea gardens planted with alpine oolong tea.

The park was established in 2010 to showcase Tsou culture and help stem out-migration and provide some economic stability following Typhoon Morakot in 2009.
