= Jiao Lung Waterfall =

Waterfall in Alishan, Chiayi County, Taiwan

Jiao Lung Waterfall 蛟龍瀑布
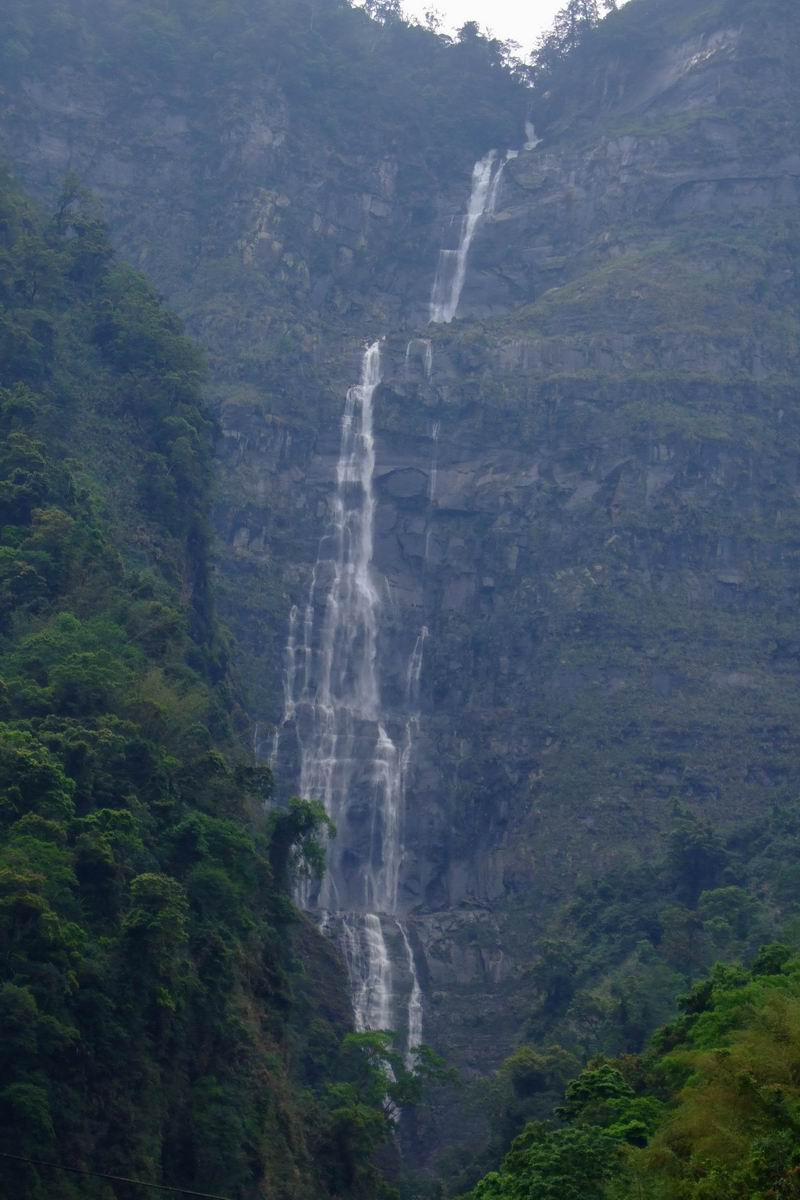
- Interactive map of Jiao Lung Waterfall 蛟龍瀑布
- Location: Mount Da Ta, Alishan, Chiayi County, Taiwan
- Coordinates: 23°33′13.25″N 120°45′57.90″E
- Type: Plunge
- Total height: 600 metres (2,000 ft)
- Number of drops: 4
- Longest drop: 600 metres (2,000 ft)
- Average flow rate: Seasonal

Jiao Lung Waterfall (Chinese: 蛟龍瀑布; pinyin: Jiāolóng Pùbù; Wade–Giles: Chiao^{1}-lung^{2} P'u^{4}-pu^{4}; Pe̍h-ōe-jī: Kau-liông pho̍k-pò͘) is the tallest measured waterfall in Taiwan, with a sheer plunge of 600 metres (2,000 ft). It is located on a cliff of Mount Da Ta in Alishan Township, Chiayi County. Its closest settlement is the small hamlet of Fengshan (豐山村). Predominantly seasonal, it has been known to have much reduced flow just several days after rain.

Although a road leads up the canyon to Fengshan, the waterfall is extremely difficult to reach during full flow. Immediately after a typhoon, the waterfall is in full flow. However, the high flows also wash away the crossings and bridges of the stream, disconnecting Fengshan from access. After just several days or even hours, the waterfall decreases noticeably in volume. This is because the falls is located on a steep and short drainage that drops 1,300 metres (4,300 ft) in its 4-kilometre (2.5 mi) run, which amounts to an average gradient of 325 metres (1,066 ft) per kilometer, or 820 feet (250 m) per mile.

== See also ==
- List of tourist attractions in Taiwan
- List of waterfalls
