= Leye, Alishan =

Village in Alishan, Chiayi County, Taiwan

Coordinates: 23.467°N 120.702°E

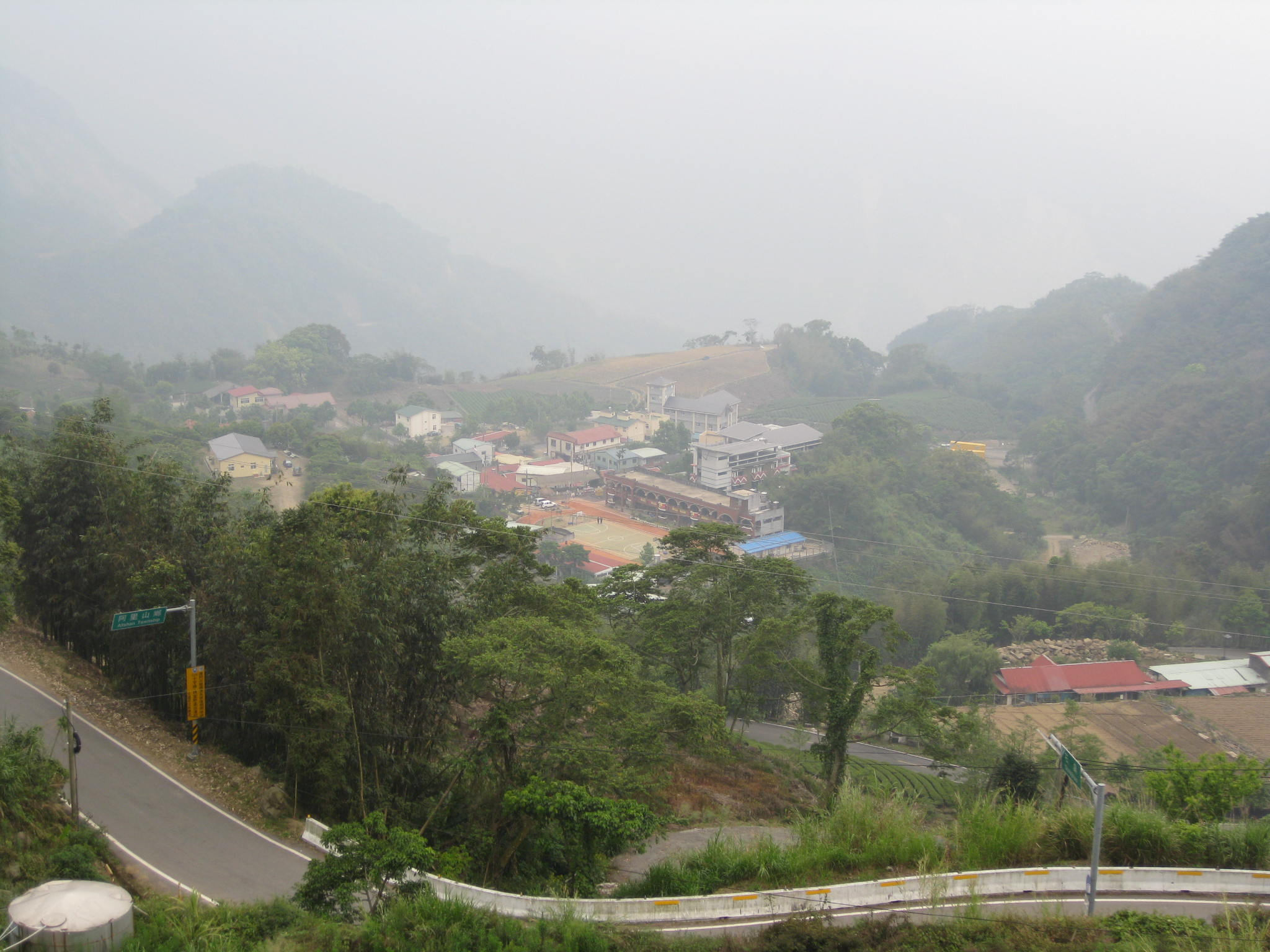
Lalauya (Leye)

Leye (Chinese: 樂野; pinyin: Lèyě) is a village in the Alishan, Chiayi County, Taiwan. It is low in altitude compared to the rest of the mountain, being only 1,200 m (3,900 ft) above sea level.

The local Taiwanese aborigines, the Tsou, call it “Lalauya” meaning maple forest. To this day, the sign marking the town still has a picture of a maple leaf. However, as the area is high up and has a cool climate, it has suitable conditions for growing tea (a main export) thus, this development has overshadowed the attraction of the maple forest. Leye is also the biggest producer of Phalaenopsis orchids in Taiwan.
