= Alishan, Chiayi =

Mountain indigenous township in Chiayi County, Taiwan

Alishan Township 阿里山鄉 Psoseongana (Tsou) Arithan/Ari a hundun (Thao)
- Mountain indigenous township
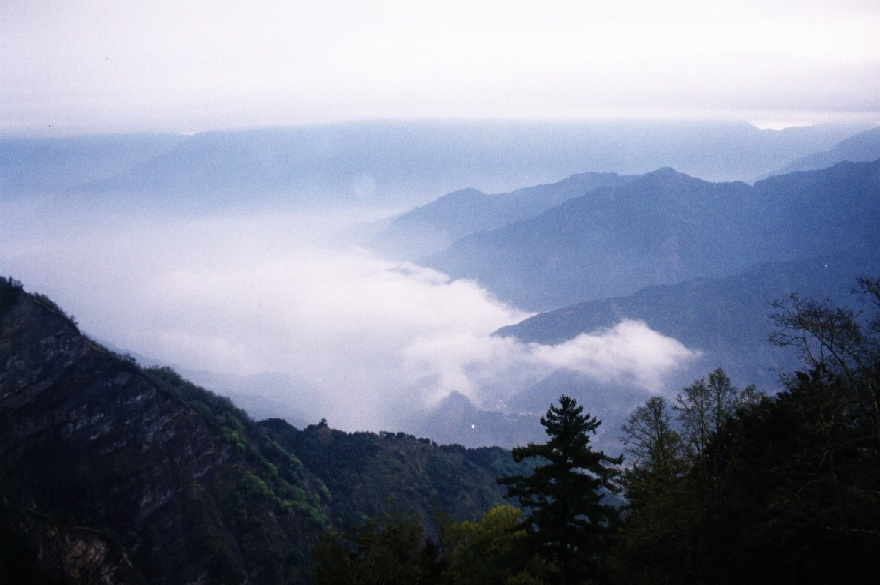
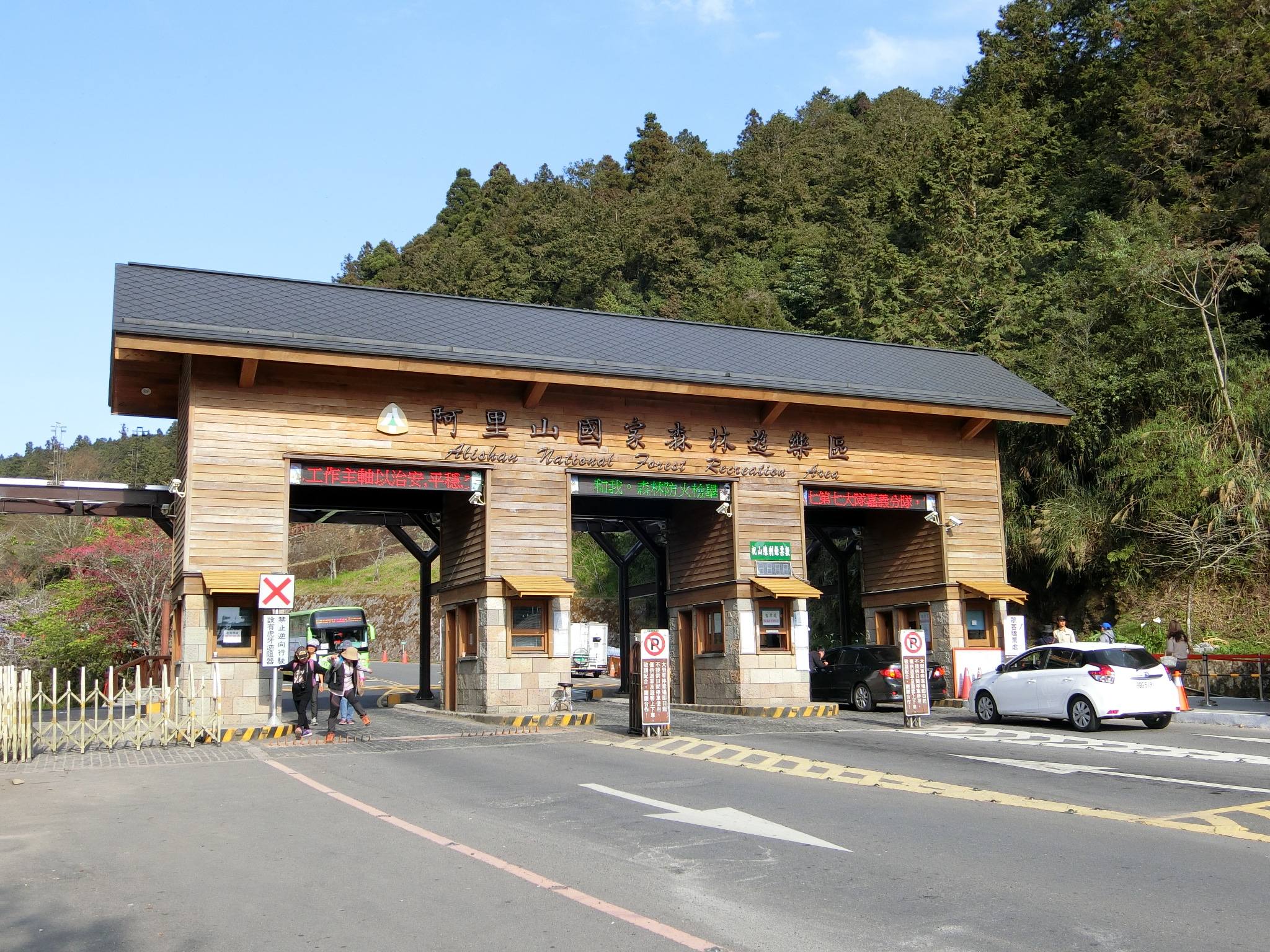
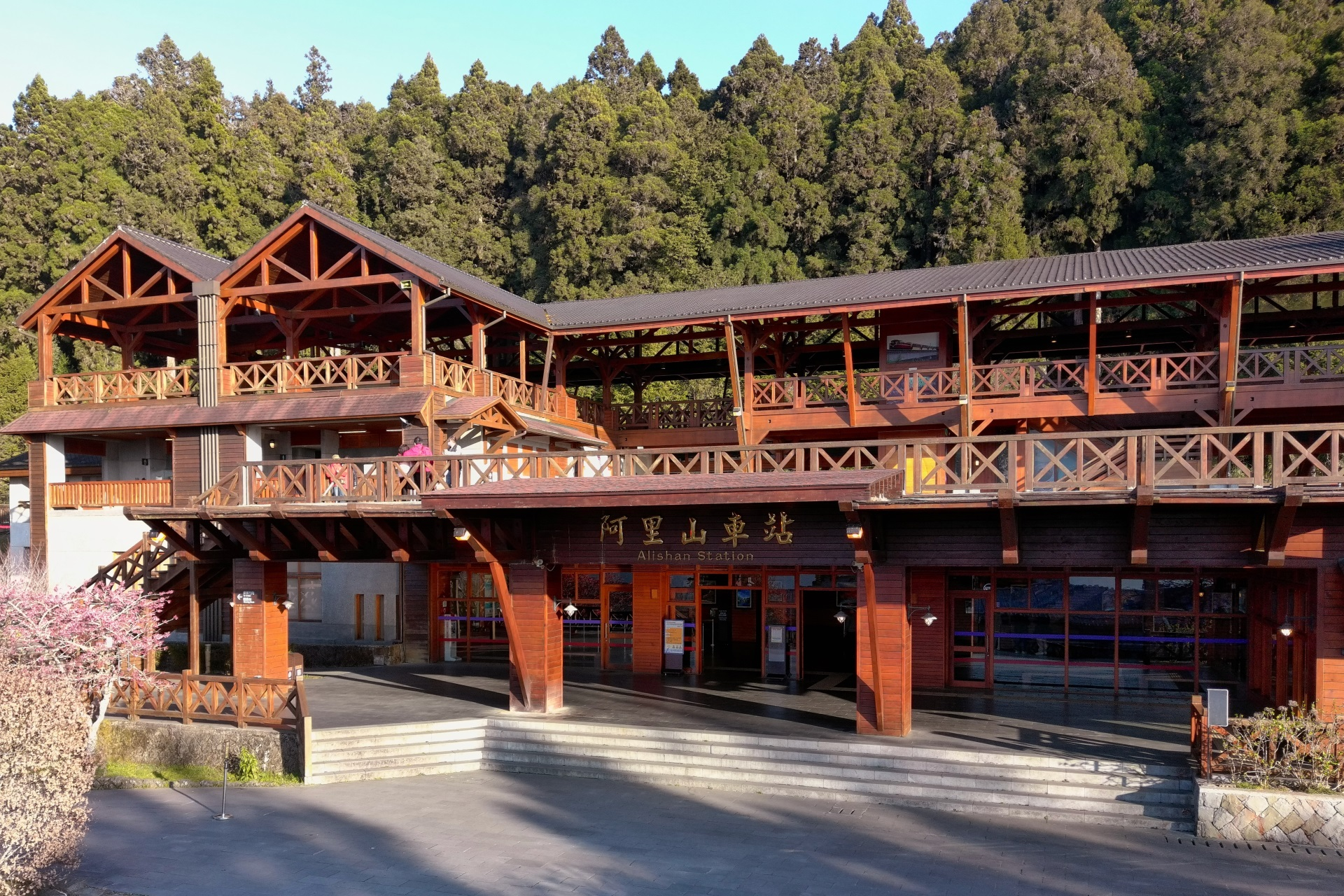
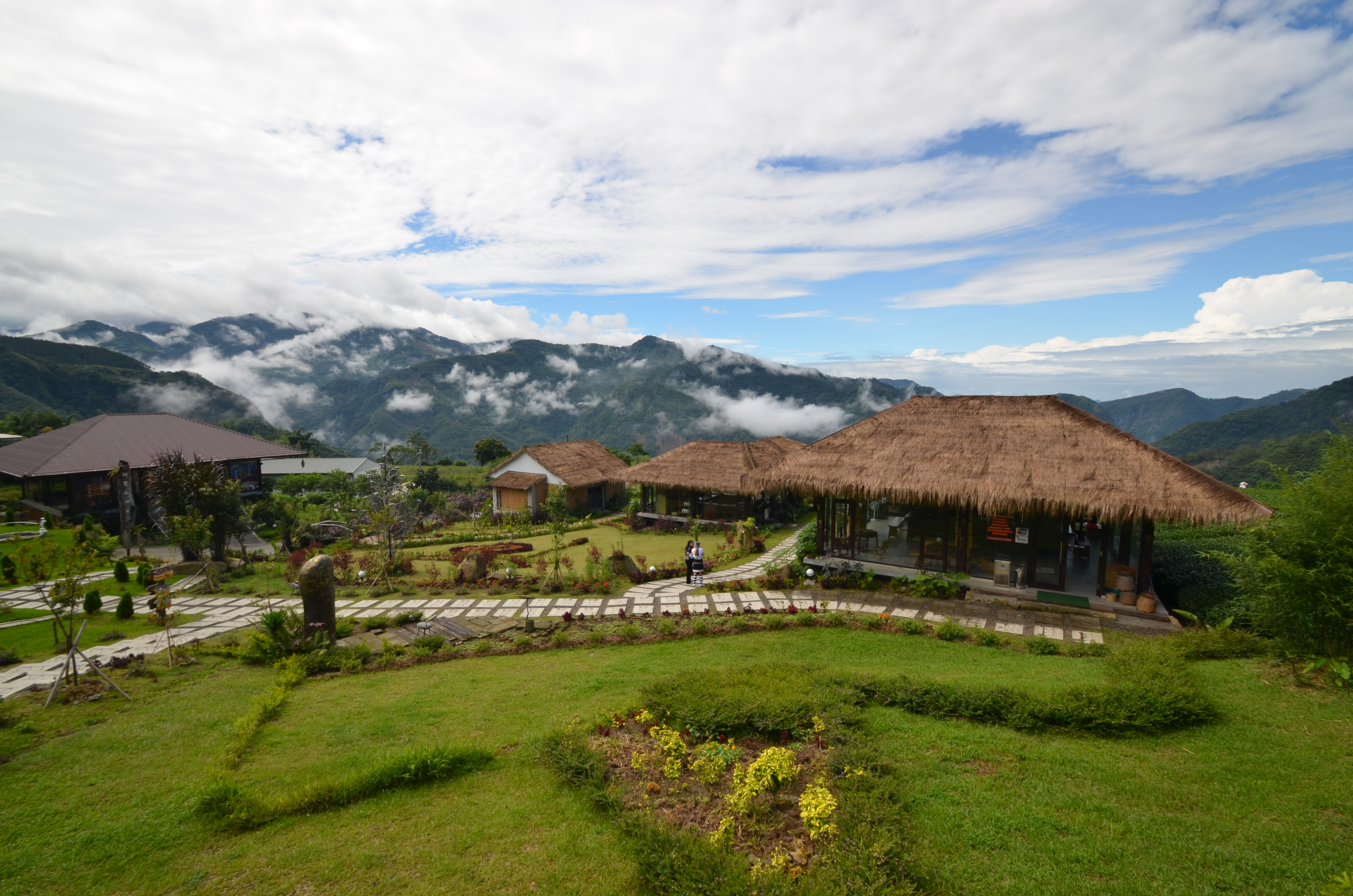
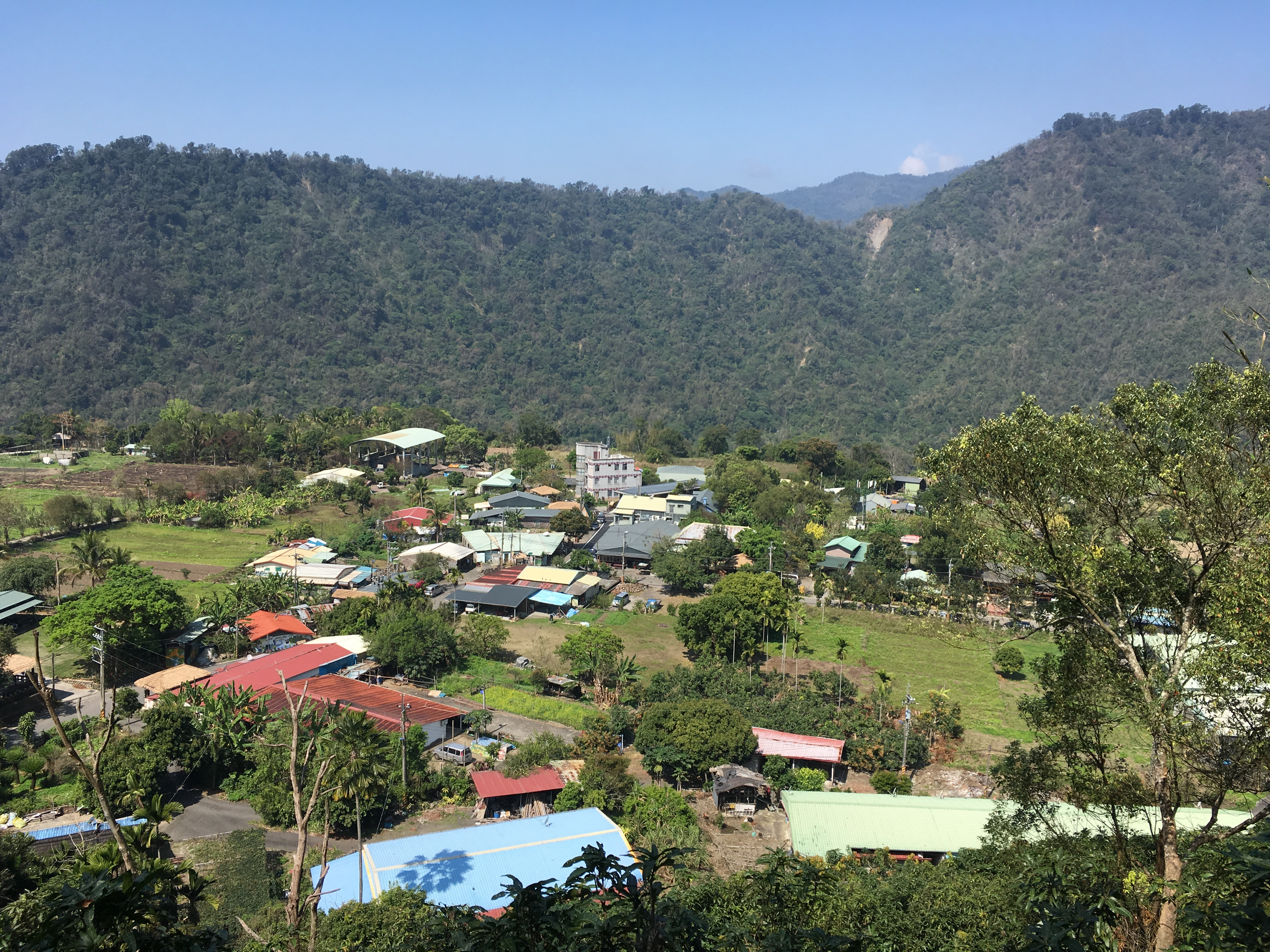
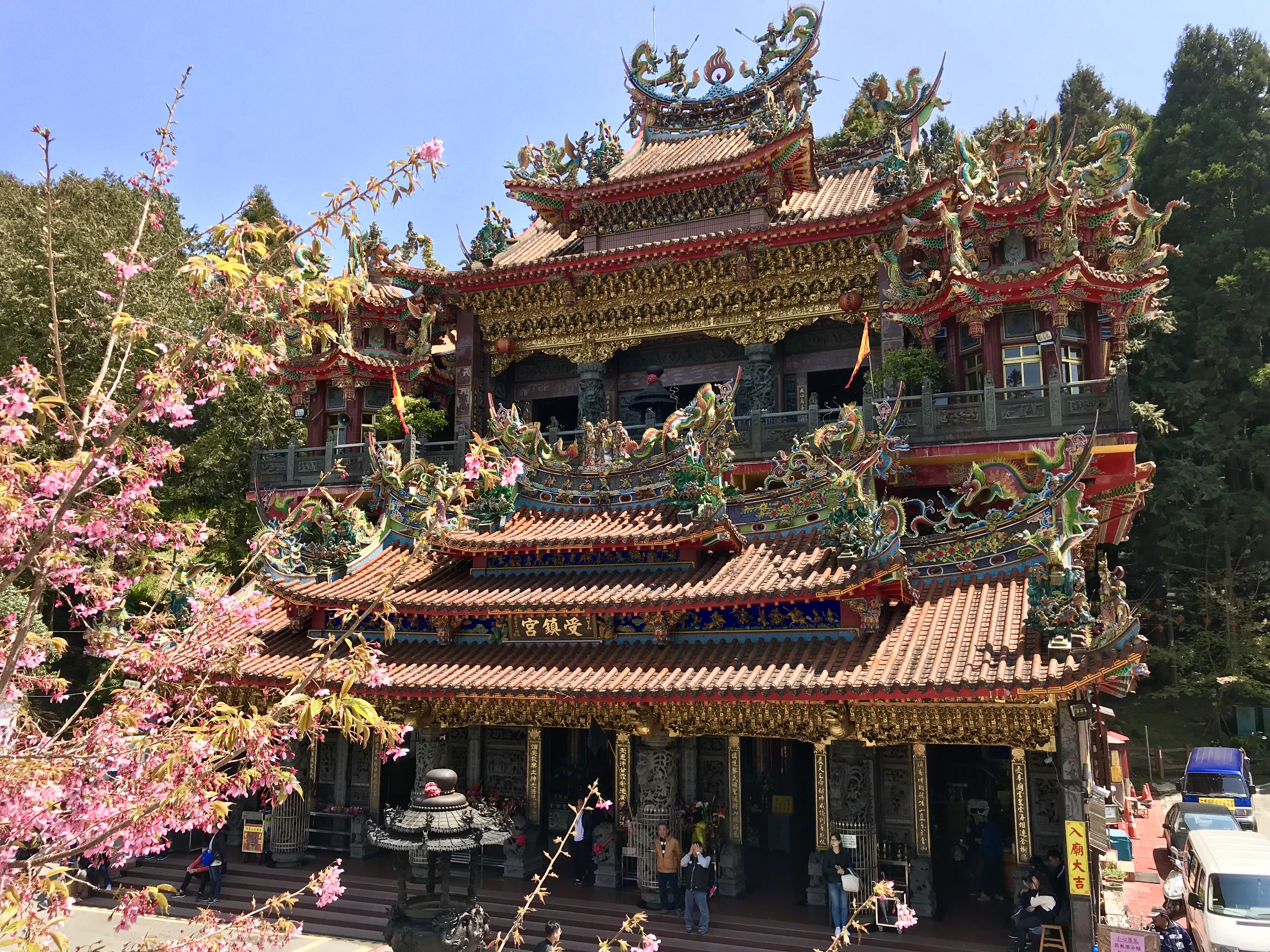
- View of the Alishan Range Alishan National Forest Recreation Area Alishan station Sisters Lake YuYuPas Tsou cultural tribe park Cayamavana Shouzhen Temple

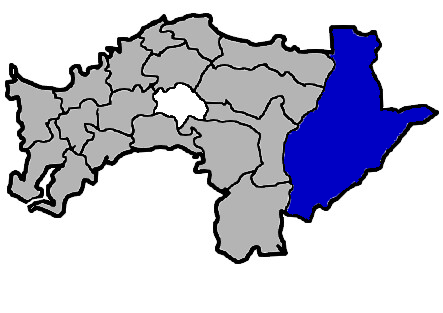
- Coordinates: 23°21′N 120°48′E
- Location: Chiayi County, Taiwan

Area
  - Total: 428 km^{2} (165 sq mi)

Population (January 2023)
  - Total: 5,374
  - Density: 12.6/km^{2} (32.5/sq mi)
- Area codes: for multiple area codes
- Website: www.alishan.gov.tw

Alishan Township (Chinese: 阿里山鄉; pinyin: Ālǐshān Xiāng) is a mountain indigenous township in Chiayi County, Taiwan. The Alishan National Scenic Area covers most, but not all, of the township and also parts of neighboring townships.

== History ==
Alishan is traditional territory of the headhunting Tsou people, whose rich oral histories describe the migrations of each ancient clans' ancestors into the area between Yushan and the Chianan Plain. Originally, each clan had its own settlement, with the first multi-clan town, Tfuya, only forming approximately 1600 CE. The earliest written record of the Tsou dates from the Dutch occupation, which describes Tfuya as having approximately 300 people in 1647. Ethnologists have attempted to reconstruct the development of Tfuya, proposing that each stage of clan migration could be equivalent to three or four generations of family.

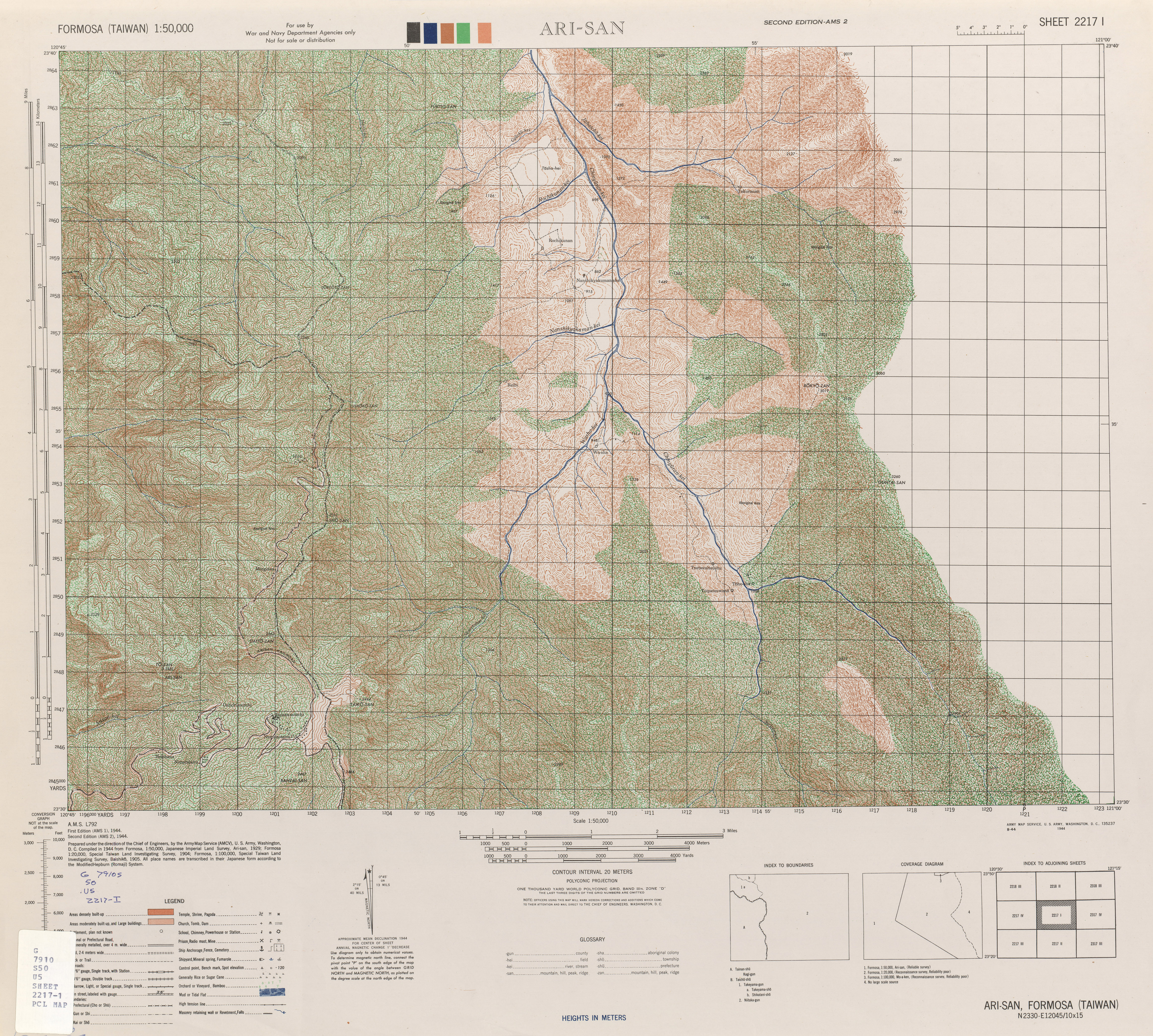
Map of Alishan area (1944)

The Alishan area was originally settled by the Tsou tribe of the Taiwanese aborigines; the name derives from the aboriginal word Jarissang. From 1920 to 1945, the area was classified as Savage Land under Kagi District, Tainan Prefecture. After 1945, the area was named Wufeng Township (吳鳳鄉), after Qing merchant Wu Feng, who Han Chinese legend credits with causing the aborigines to give up headhunting.

In 1989, soon after the 1987 lifting of martial law in Taiwan and taking advantage of a new-found emphasis on human rights, aborigines who had long been offended by their perception of racism in the Wu Feng story protested against its continued presence in history books, and as part of the protest, they demolished statues of Wu Feng "wherever they found them". As a result, in March 1989 Wufeng was renamed Alishan Township.

== Geography ==
It has a population total of 5,374 and an area of 427.8471 square kilometres. It is located at an elevation of 2,190 metres (7,190 ft) in the western highlands of Taiwan.

=== Climate ===
Alishan has a subtropical highland climate (Köppen: Cwb) with extremely wet and mild conditions during the monsoon season when the town receives 3.2 metres (130 in) of rain in five months, and cool and drier conditions during the winter months. Temperatures remain relatively constant throughout the year, with only noticeably cooler temperatures during the winter months of December to February of the following year. When typhoons hit Taiwan during the wet season, rainfall in highland locations like Alishan can exceed 1 metre (39 in) per day, which is the heaviest rainfall in the Northern Hemisphere and exceeded only in a few oceanic islands of the Southern Hemisphere such as Réunion.

Climate data for Alishan, elevation 2,413 m (7,917 ft), (1991–2020 normals, extremes 1933–present）
| Month | Jan | Feb | Mar | Apr | May | Jun | Jul | Aug | Sep | Oct | Nov | Dec | Year |
|---|---|---|---|---|---|---|---|---|---|---|---|---|---|
| Record high °C (°F) | 20.4 (68.7) | 21.3 (70.3) | 21.7 (71.1) | 23.6 (74.5) | 23.0 (73.4) | 25.5 (77.9) | 24.9 (76.8) | 24.3 (75.7) | 25.2 (77.4) | 23.6 (74.5) | 23.2 (73.8) | 20.8 (69.4) | 25.5 (77.9) |
| Mean daily maximum °C (°F) | 11.0 (51.8) | 11.7 (53.1) | 13.9 (57.0) | 15.7 (60.3) | 17.2 (63.0) | 18.4 (65.1) | 19.3 (66.7) | 18.8 (65.8) | 18.5 (65.3) | 17.4 (63.3) | 15.6 (60.1) | 12.6 (54.7) | 15.8 (60.5) |
| Daily mean °C (°F) | 6.5 (43.7) | 7.3 (45.1) | 9.5 (49.1) | 11.5 (52.7) | 13.1 (55.6) | 14.4 (57.9) | 14.7 (58.5) | 14.6 (58.3) | 14.0 (57.2) | 12.4 (54.3) | 10.7 (51.3) | 8.0 (46.4) | 11.4 (52.5) |
| Mean daily minimum °C (°F) | 3.1 (37.6) | 4.1 (39.4) | 6.1 (43.0) | 8.4 (47.1) | 10.2 (50.4) | 11.6 (52.9) | 11.6 (52.9) | 11.7 (53.1) | 11.0 (51.8) | 9.1 (48.4) | 7.4 (45.3) | 4.6 (40.3) | 8.2 (46.8) |
| Record low °C (°F) | −11.5 (11.3) | −8.5 (16.7) | −7.0 (19.4) | −5.5 (22.1) | 0.7 (33.3) | 0.0 (32.0) | 5.6 (42.1) | 4.0 (39.2) | −0.8 (30.6) | −5.2 (22.6) | −5.0 (23.0) | −8.0 (17.6) | −11.5 (11.3) |
| Average precipitation mm (inches) | 86.8 (3.42) | 109.9 (4.33) | 146.6 (5.77) | 223.9 (8.81) | 510.4 (20.09) | 674.7 (26.56) | 694.7 (27.35) | 813.1 (32.01) | 402.7 (15.85) | 141.2 (5.56) | 66.9 (2.63) | 69.7 (2.74) | 3,940.6 (155.12) |
| Average precipitation days (≥ 0.1 mm) | 7.9 | 8.3 | 9.8 | 12.5 | 19.3 | 19.7 | 21.0 | 22.6 | 16.8 | 9.2 | 6.6 | 7.4 | 161.1 |
| Average relative humidity (%) | 80.6 | 83.4 | 81.4 | 84.0 | 89.2 | 89.5 | 91.1 | 92.2 | 91.3 | 86.9 | 82.4 | 80.6 | 86.1 |
| Mean monthly sunshine hours | 149.2 | 120.6 | 138.0 | 120.9 | 103.2 | 108.0 | 118.1 | 102.0 | 105.2 | 135.6 | 143.3 | 148.3 | 1,492.4 |
Source: Central Weather Bureau

Climate data for Dabang, elevation 980 m (3,220 ft), (2019–2023, extremes 2016–present)
| Month | Jan | Feb | Mar | Apr | May | Jun | Jul | Aug | Sep | Oct | Nov | Dec | Year |
|---|---|---|---|---|---|---|---|---|---|---|---|---|---|
| Record high °C (°F) | 25.3 (77.5) | 27.4 (81.3) | 30.1 (86.2) | 29.4 (84.9) | 31.4 (88.5) | 30.1 (86.2) | 30.4 (86.7) | 31.7 (89.1) | 30.0 (86.0) | 31.4 (88.5) | 28.4 (83.1) | 26.3 (79.3) | 31.7 (89.1) |
| Mean daily maximum °C (°F) | 20.2 (68.4) | 21.1 (70.0) | 22.8 (73.0) | 24.3 (75.7) | 26.0 (78.8) | 27.1 (80.8) | 27.8 (82.0) | 26.9 (80.4) | 26.8 (80.2) | 25.4 (77.7) | 23.9 (75.0) | 20.7 (69.3) | 24.4 (75.9) |
| Daily mean °C (°F) | 14.7 (58.5) | 15.9 (60.6) | 17.8 (64.0) | 19.5 (67.1) | 21.3 (70.3) | 22.1 (71.8) | 22.6 (72.7) | 22.1 (71.8) | 22.0 (71.6) | 20.9 (69.6) | 19.0 (66.2) | 15.9 (60.6) | 19.5 (67.1) |
| Mean daily minimum °C (°F) | 11.3 (52.3) | 11.9 (53.4) | 13.9 (57.0) | 15.8 (60.4) | 18.0 (64.4) | 18.7 (65.7) | 19.0 (66.2) | 19.1 (66.4) | 18.7 (65.7) | 15.6 (60.1) | 13.3 (55.9) | 12.6 (54.7) | 15.7 (60.2) |
| Record low °C (°F) | 2.7 (36.9) | 3.5 (38.3) | 5.0 (41.0) | 7.2 (45.0) | 13.9 (57.0) | 16.7 (62.1) | 16.6 (61.9) | 17.1 (62.8) | 16.2 (61.2) | 11.4 (52.5) | 9.3 (48.7) | 4.5 (40.1) | 2.7 (36.9) |
| Average precipitation mm (inches) | 61.0 (2.40) | 38.9 (1.53) | 85.2 (3.35) | 119.3 (4.70) | 350.2 (13.79) | 580.6 (22.86) | 352.4 (13.87) | 549.9 (21.65) | 272.7 (10.74) | 58.3 (2.30) | 23.3 (0.92) | 43.7 (1.72) | 2,535.5 (99.83) |
| Average precipitation days | 7.8 | 5.6 | 8.6 | 9.9 | 17.0 | 20.8 | 21.9 | 22.2 | 15.0 | 8.4 | 4.8 | 6.2 | 148.2 |
| Average relative humidity (%) | 77.1 | 76.2 | 76.6 | 77.9 | 82.0 | 84.7 | 85.7 | 87.7 | 85.1 | 83.2 | 79.9 | 79.0 | 81.3 |
Source 1: Central Weather Administration
Source 2: Atmospheric Science Research and Application Databank (precipitation and humidity 2016–2023)

== Administrative divisions ==
Administrative divisions of Alishan Township

The township comprises 12 villages: Chashan, Dabang, Fongshan, Laiji, Leye, Lijia, Shanmei, Shihzih, Sianglin, Sinmei, Jhongshan and Jhongjheng.

== Tourist attractions ==
Alishan is the main base for trekkers in the highlands of Taiwan and for mountain climbers aiming to scale Yu Shan, Taiwan's highest peak and the highest and sole formerly glaciated point on the Tropic of Cancer. Chu Shan, though lower, is more accessible and climbed by most visitors to the region, which is extremely popular with Taiwanese tourists. The highland region in which Alishan is situated also contains a number of notable rock formations from the continuing uplift of the island. Jiao Lung Waterfall, Taiwan's tallest waterfall, is located within the township. YuYuPas Tsou cultural tribe park showcases the culture of the Tsou.

== Transportation ==
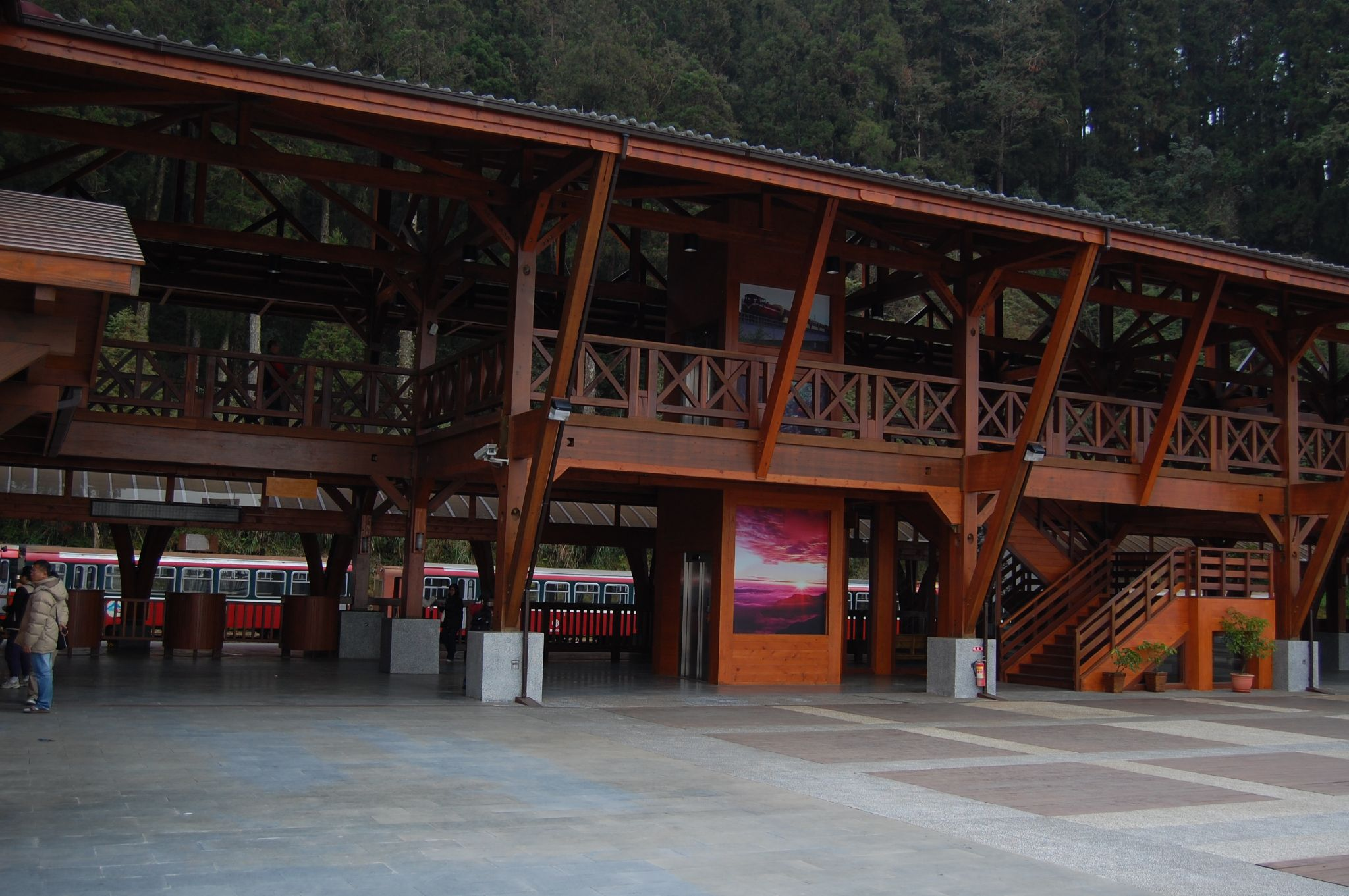
Alishan Rail Station

Alishan township is accessible from Duolin Station, Shizilu Station, Pingzhena Station, Erwanping Station, Shenmu Station, Alishan Station and Zhaoping Station of the Alishan Forest Railway.

== Notable natives ==
- Francesca Kao, actress, singer and television host
- Shih Chih-wei, baseball player
