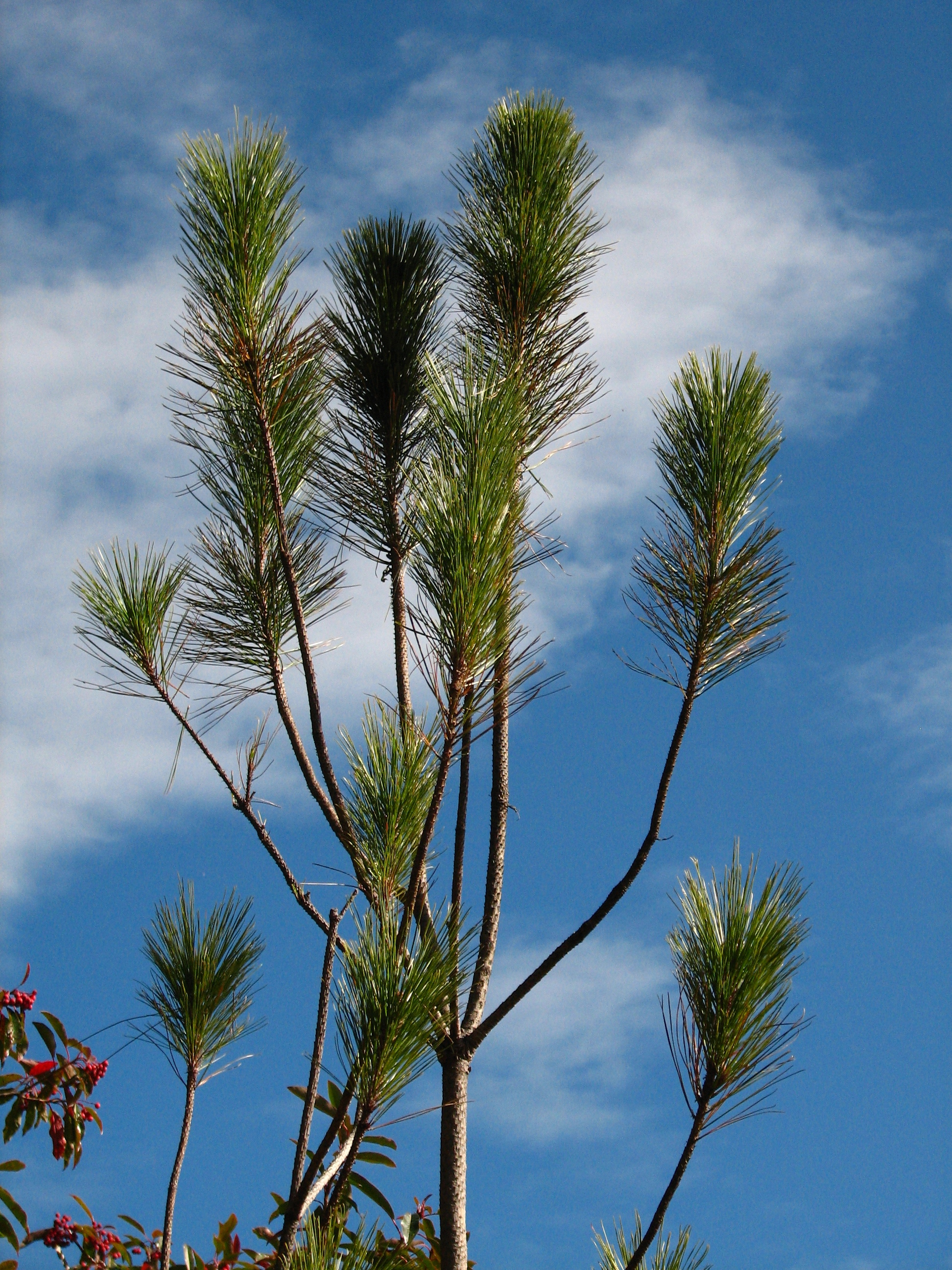

Conservation status
- Least Concern (IUCN 3.1)

Scientific classification
- Kingdom: Plantae
- Clade: Tracheophytes
- Clade: Gymnosperms
- Division: Pinophyta
- Class: Pinopsida
- Order: Pinales
- Family: Pinaceae
- Genus: Pinus
- Subgenus: P. subg. Pinus
- Section: P. sect. Pinus
- Subsection: P. subsect. Pinus
- Species: P. taiwanensis

Binomial name
- Pinus taiwanensis Hayata

= Pinus taiwanensis =

Species of conifer

Pinus taiwanensis, the Taiwan red pine, is a species of conifer, a pine, in the family Pinaceae endemic to Taiwan.

== Taxonomy ==
It is a close relative of Pinus luchuensis of Japan and P. hwangshanensis of China, sometimes considered as a subspecies of the former. Sometimes P. hwangshanensis from China are also referred to as P. taiwanensis. P. taiwanensis var. fragilissima and P. taiwanensis var. taiwanensis are the two varieties of this species.

== Description ==
The Taiwan red pine is a large tree, with a straight trunk up to 35 metres (115 feet) tall and 80 centimetres (2 1/2 ft) in diameter. Needles are in bundles of two. Cones are 6–7 cm (2 1/4–2 3/4 inches) long. It is a common species in the Central Mountain Range at altitudes of 750–3,000 m (2,500–9,800 ft), often in pure stands.
