= Kaohsiung =

City in southern Taiwan

Kaohsiung City 高雄市 (Note: In local languages: Traditional Chinese script: 高雄市; Mandarin Pinyin: Gāoxióng Shì; Hokkien: Ko-hiông Tshī; Sixian Hakka: Gó-hiǔng Sii; Hailu Hakka: Gò-hiung Shi^{+}) Takau, Takao, Takow
- Special municipality
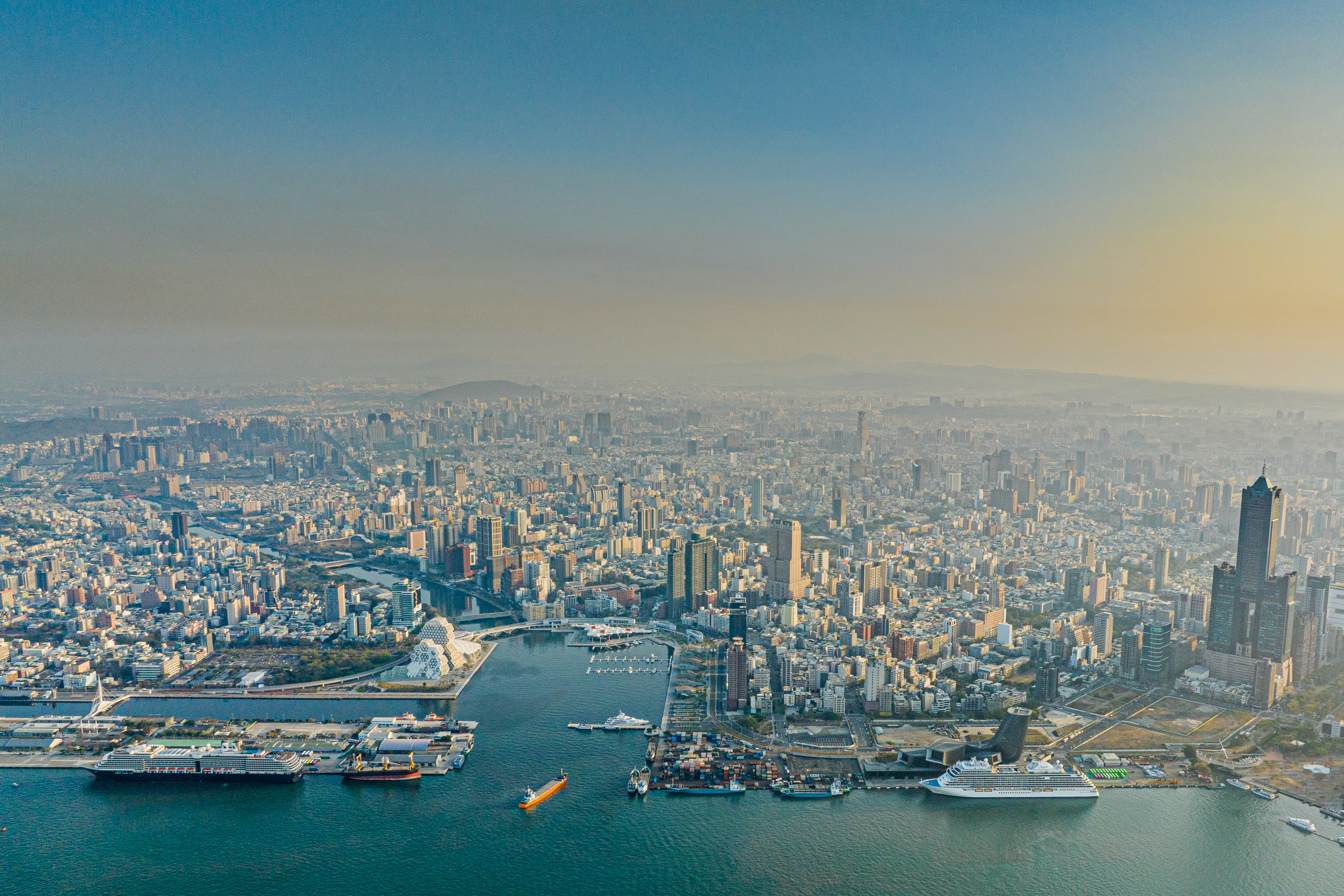
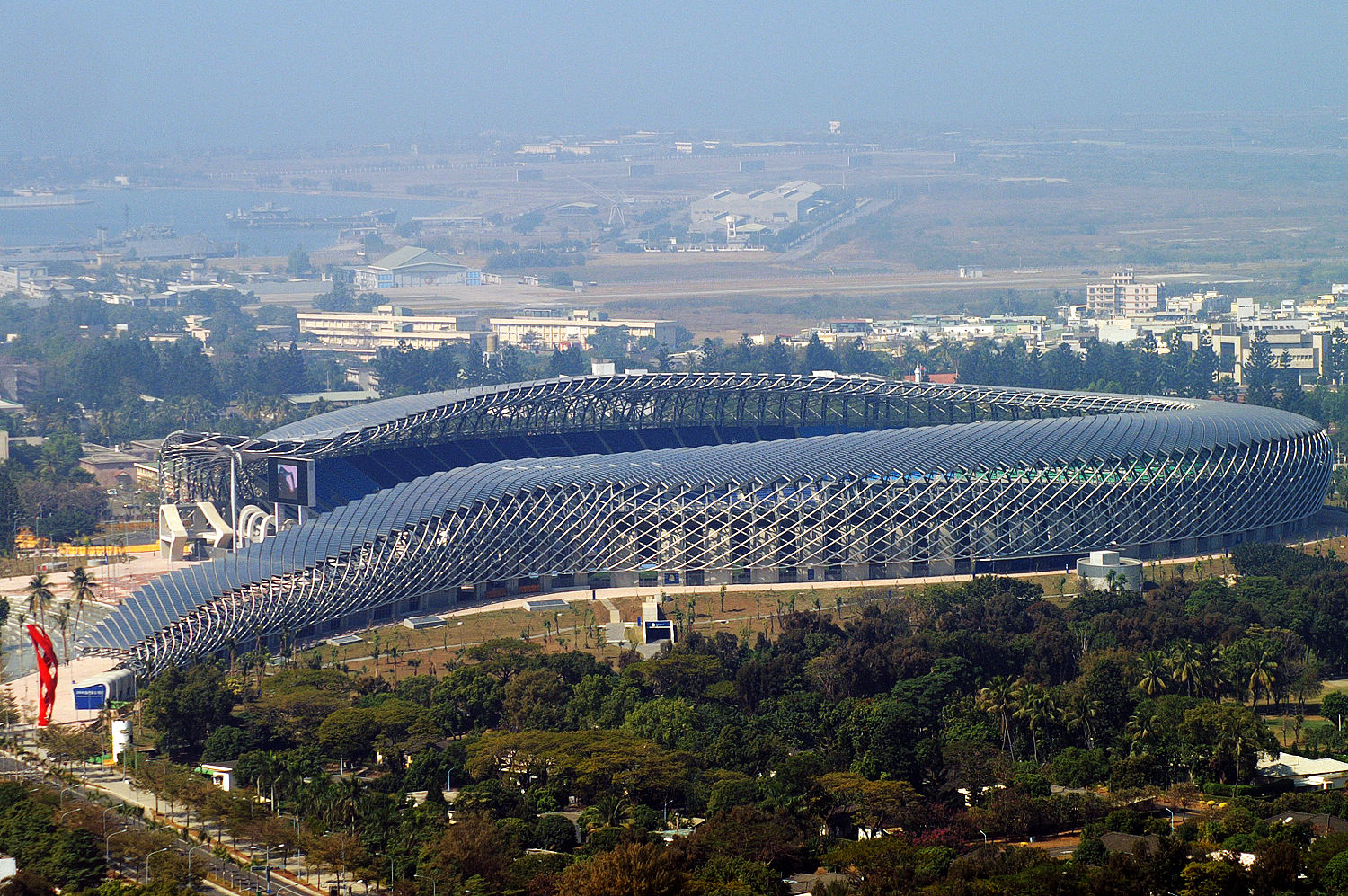
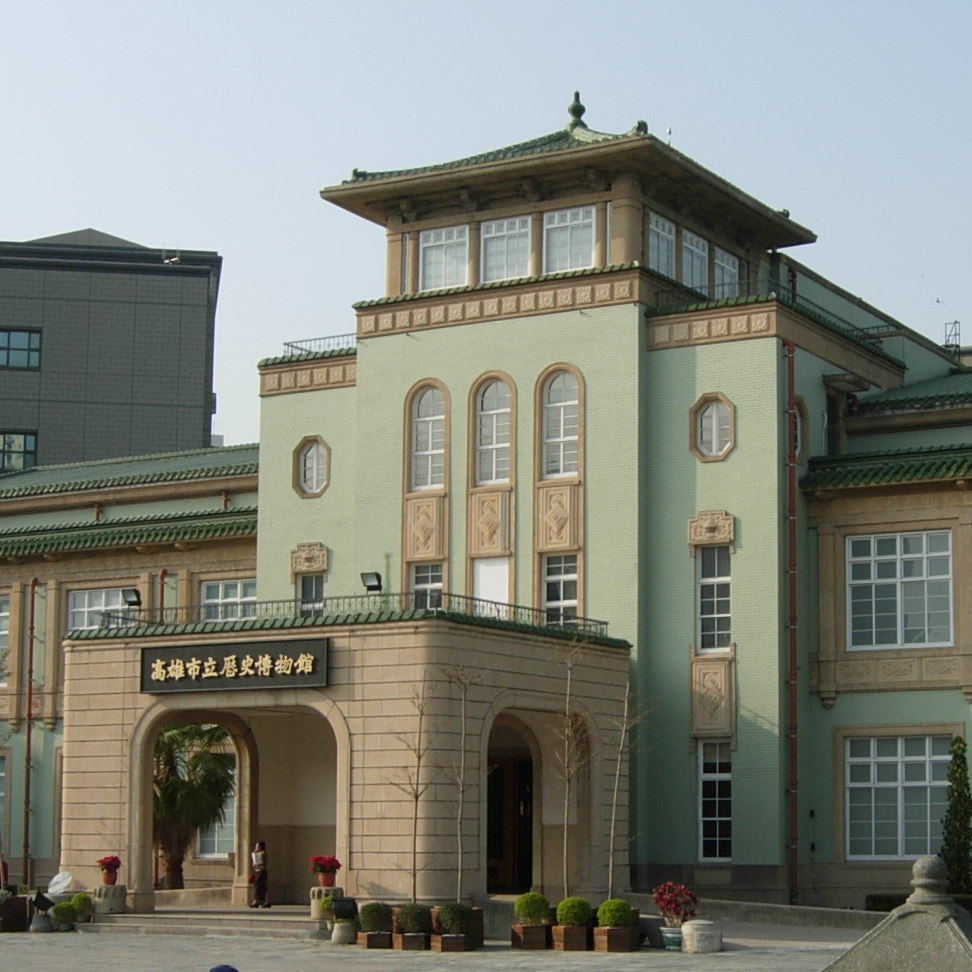
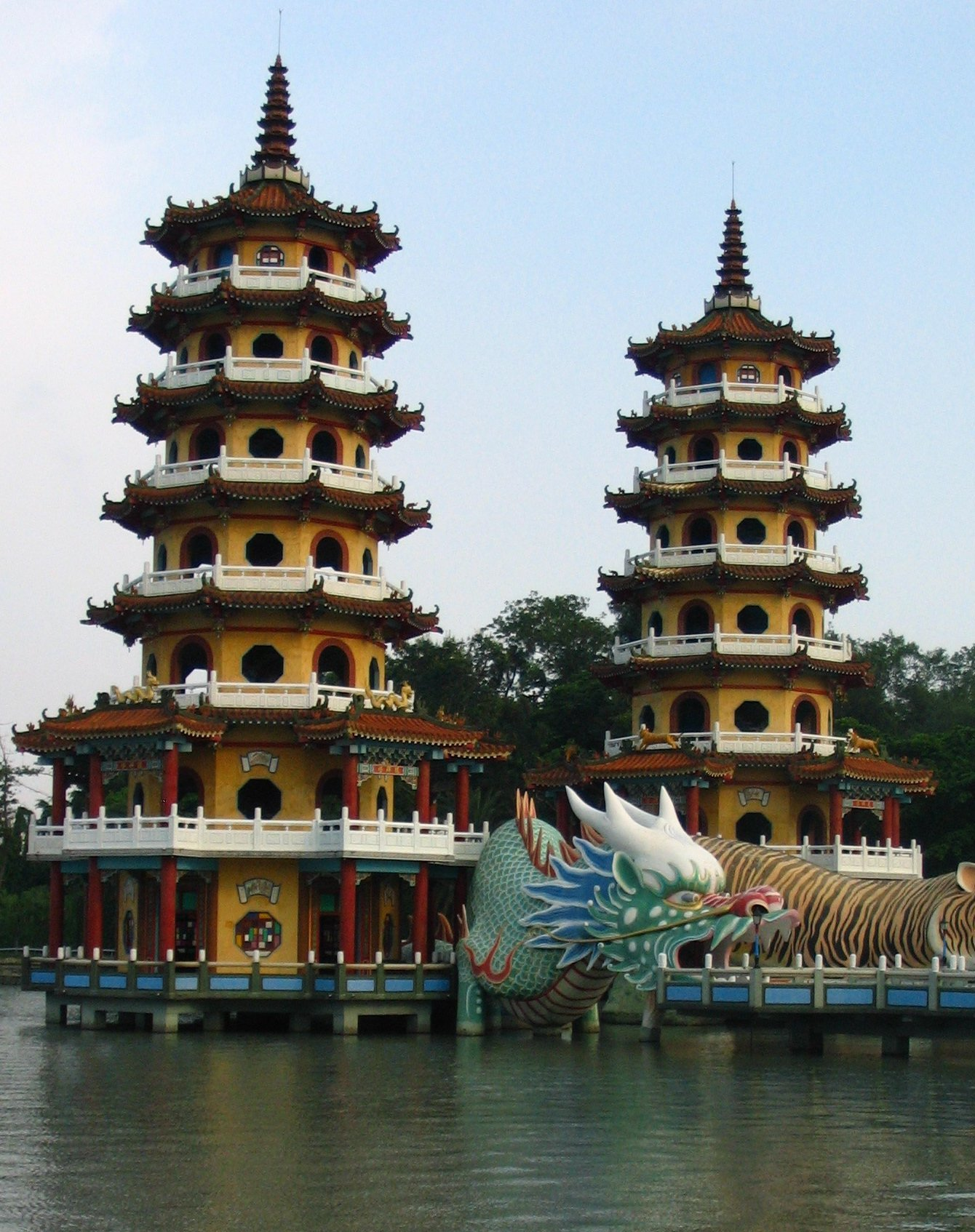
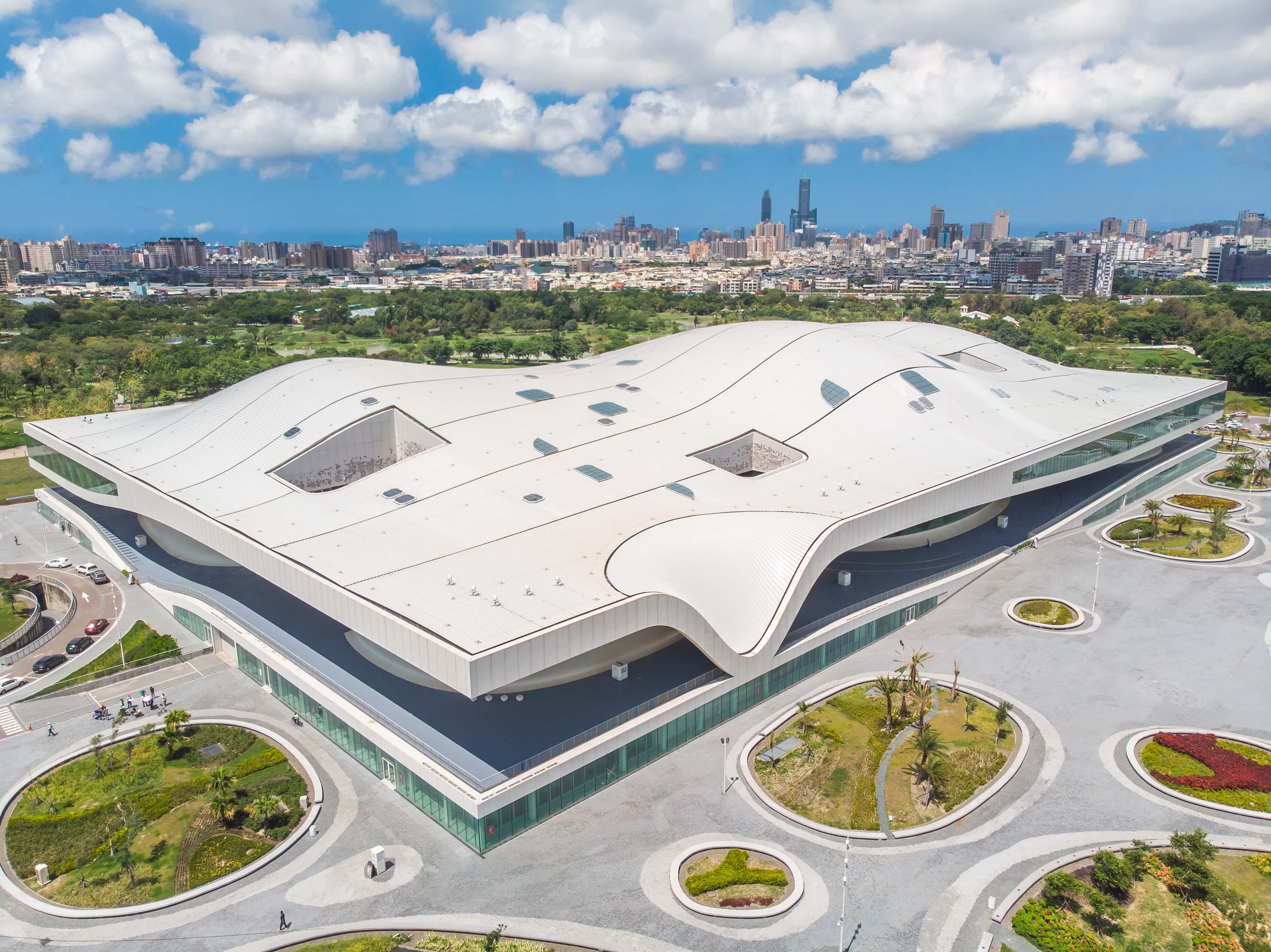
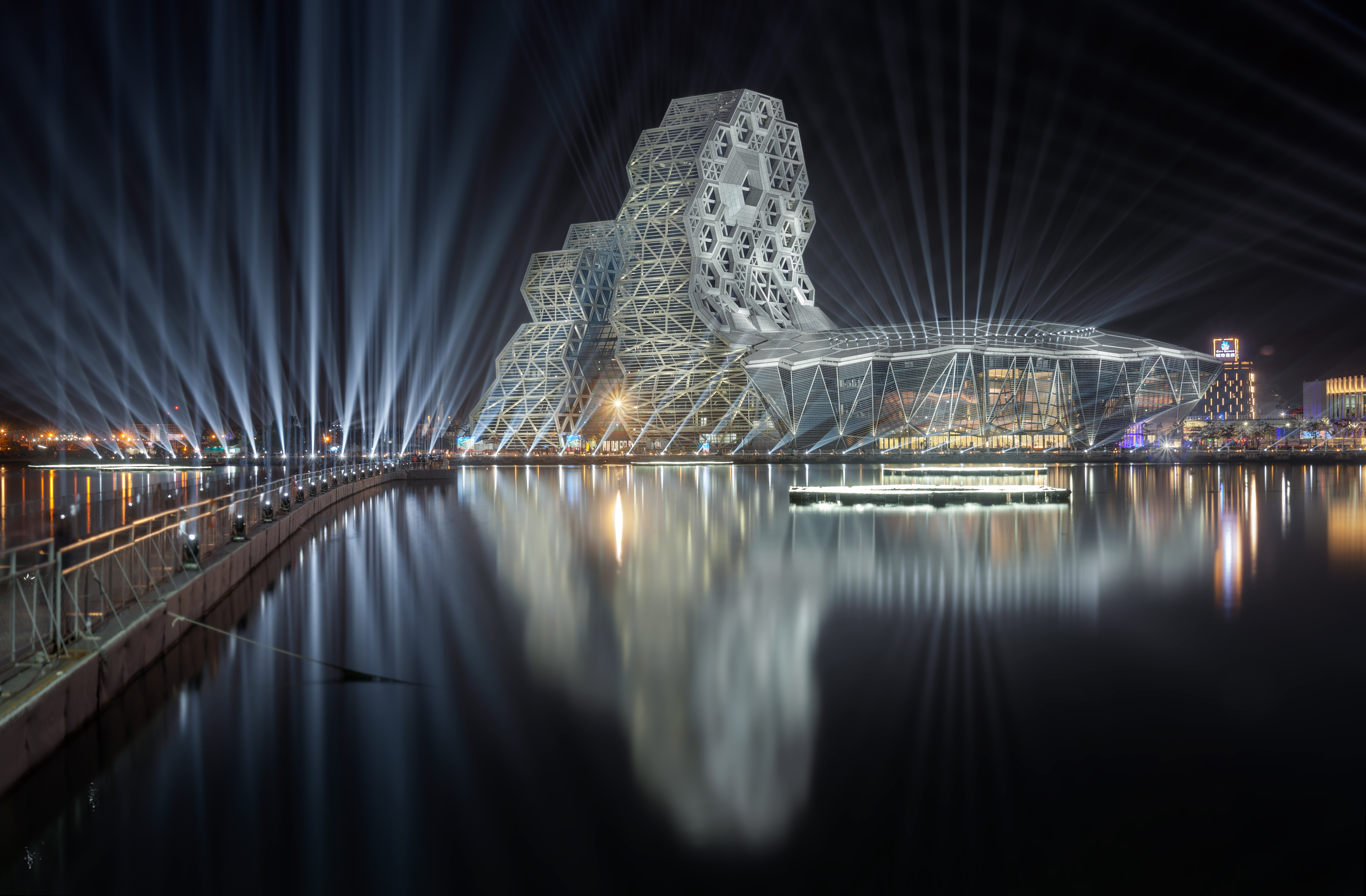
- Kaohsiung skyline Kaohsiung National Stadium Kaohsiung Museum of History Lotus Pond National Kaohsiung Center for the Arts Kaohsiung Music Center

- Flag Logo (stylized form of 高)
- Etymology: Takao Prefecture
- Nickname(s): The Harbor City (Gǎngdū), The Maritime Capital, The Waterfront City
- Interactive map of Kaohsiung City
- Country: Republic of China (Taiwan)
- Fongshan County: 1683
- Takao Prefecture: September 1920
- Kaohsiung City: 25 October 1945
- Kaohsiung County: 6 December 1945
- Upgraded to Yuan-controlled municipality: 1 July 1979
- Merger with Kaohsiung County: 25 December 2010
- City seat: Lingya District (mayor's office); Fongshan District (City Council); 22°36′54″N 120°17′51″E
- Districts: 38
- Largest district: Sanmin District

Government
  - Mayor: Chen Chi-mai (DPP)
- Legislature: Kaohsiung City Council

National representation
  - Legislative Yuan: 8 of 113 constituencies

Area
  - Total: 2,951.85 km^{2} (1,139.72 sq mi) (4th)
- Elevation: 9 m (30 ft)

Population
  - Aug 2026 estimate: 2,707,022 (List of administrative divisions of Taiwan) (3rd)
- GDP (PPP): 2016 estimate
  - Total: US$45,285 (12th)
- GDP (nominal): 2016 estimate
  - Total: NT$684,260 (12th)
- Time zone: UTC+8 (National Standard Time)
- Calling code: 07
- Postal code: 800–852
- ISO 3166 code: TW-KHH
- Website: www.kcg.gov.tw/en (in English)
- Symbols
- Flower: Chinese hibiscus (Hibiscus rosa-sinensis)
- Tree: Cotton Tree (Bombax ceiba)

Kaohsiung City
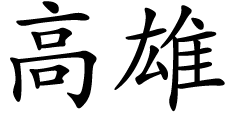
- "Kaohsiung" in Chinese characters

Chinese name
- Chinese: 高雄市
- Literal meaning: Japanese transcription of an old Siraya name
Transcriptions
Standard Mandarin
- Hanyu Pinyin: Gāoxióng Shì
- Bopomofo: ㄍㄠ ㄒㄩㄥˊ ㄕˋ
- Gwoyeu Romatzyh: Gaushyong Shyh
- Wade–Giles: Kao^{1}-hsiung^{2} Shih^{4}
- Tongyong Pinyin: Gaosyóng Shìh
- Yale Romanization: Gāusyúng Shr̀
- MPS2: Gāushiúng Shr̀
- IPA: [káʊ.ɕjʊ̌ŋ ʂɻ̩̂]
Hakka
- Pha̍k-fa-sṳ: Kô-hiùng-sṳ
Yue: Cantonese
- Jyutping: gou1 hung4 si5
- IPA: [kɔw˥ hʊŋ˩ si˩˧]
Southern Min
- Hokkien POJ: Ko-hiông-chhī
- Tâi-lô: Ko-hiông-tshī

Japanese name
- Kanji: 高雄市
- Hiragana: たかおし
- Katakana: タカオシ
Transcriptions
- Revised Hepburn: Takao-shi
- Kunrei-shiki: Takao-si

Location of Pratas Island and Taiping Island (administered by Cijin District, Kaohsiung) relative to the city of Kaohsiung
Legend： red: Pratas Island blue: Taiping Island green: Kaohsiung

Kaohsiung, (Note: Standard Mandarin: [káʊɕjʊ̌ŋ]; Chinese: 高雄; pinyin: Gāoxióng; Wade–Giles: Kao¹-hsiung²) officially Kaohsiung City, (Note: In local languages: Traditional Chinese script: 高雄市; Mandarin Pinyin: Gāoxióng Shì; Hokkien: Ko-hiông Tshī; Sixian Hakka: Gó-hiǔng Sii; Hailu Hakka: Gò-hiung Shi^{+}) is a special municipality located in southern Taiwan. With a population of approximately 2.7 million people, it is Taiwan's third most populous city and the largest city in southern Taiwan. After merging with Kaohsiung County in 2010, the city extends from the coastal urban center across inland rural areas, and stretches into the mountainous Yushan Range, making it the largest city in Taiwan by area at 2,952 km^{2} (1,140 mi^{2}).

Founded in the 17th century as a small trading village named Tancoia, a name of uncertain origins, (Note: also spelled Takao, Takau, Takow) the city has since grown into the economic center of southern Taiwan, with key industries such as manufacturing, steel-making, oil refining, freight transport and shipbuilding. It is classified as a "Sufficiency" level global city by the Globalization and World Cities Research Network, with some of the most prominent infrastructures in Taiwan.

Kaohsiung is of strategic importance to the nation as the main port city of Taiwan; the Port of Kaohsiung is the largest and busiest harbor in Taiwan: more than 67% of the nation's export and import container volume passes through Kaohsiung. Kaohsiung International Airport is the second busiest airport by number of passengers in Taiwan. The city is well-connected to other major cities by high speed and conventional rail, as well as several national freeways. It also hosts the Republic of China Navy (ROCN) fleet headquarters and its naval academy. More recent public works such as Pier-2 Art Center, National Kaohsiung Center for the Arts and Kaohsiung Music Center have been aimed at growing the tourism and cultural industries of the city.

== Etymology ==
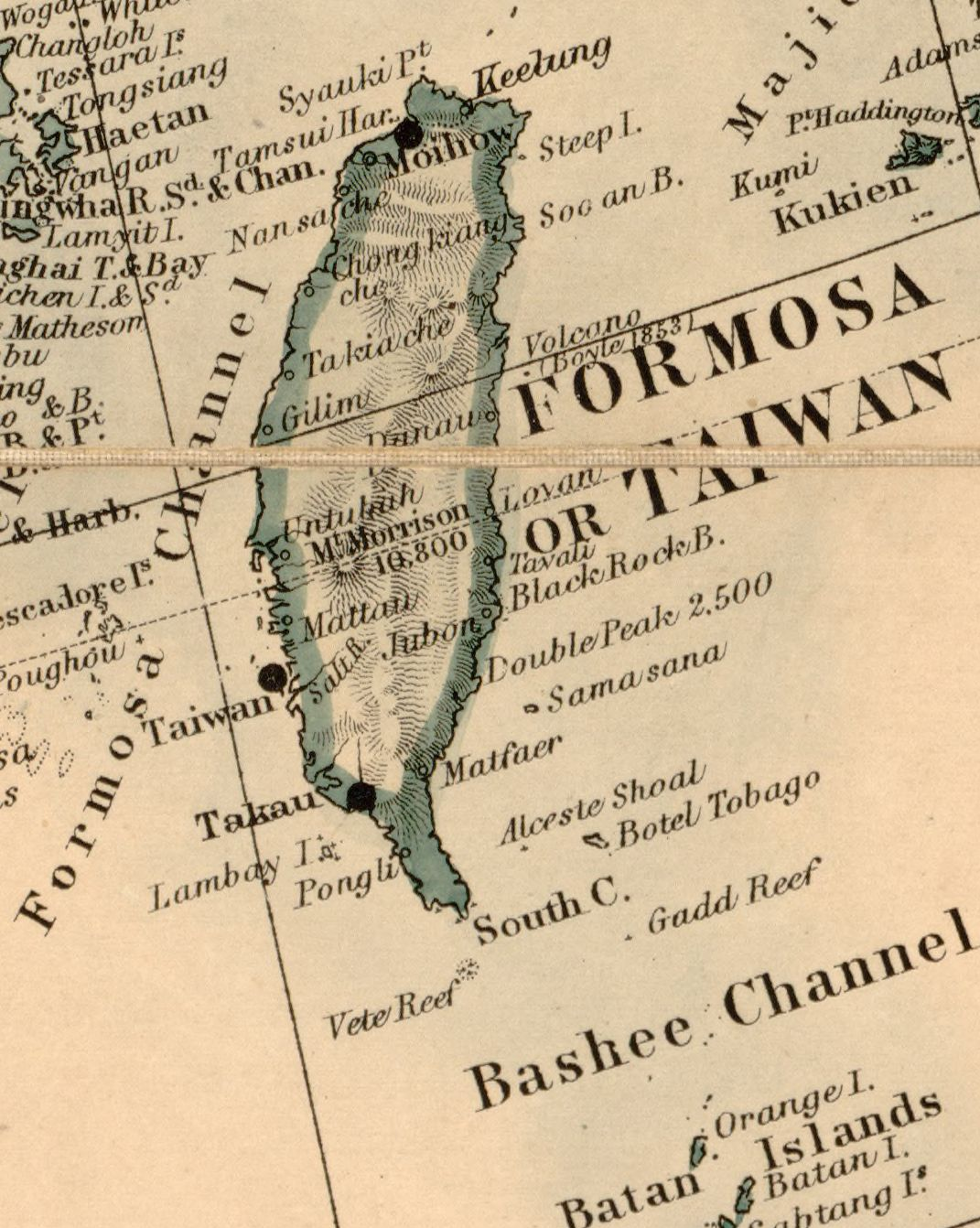
Map of Taiwan including Takau (Kaohsiung) (1880)

Hoklo immigrants to the area during the 16th and 17th centuries called the region Takau (Chinese: 打狗; Pe̍h-ōe-jī: Táⁿ-káu). The surface meaning of the associated Chinese characters was "beat the dog". According to one theory, the name "Takau" originates from the indigenous Austronesian Siraya language and translates as "bamboo forest". According to another theory, the name evolved via metathesis from the name of the Makatao tribe, who inhabited the area at the time of European and Hoklo settlement. The Makatao is considered by some to be part of the Siraya tribe.

During the Dutch colonization of southern Taiwan, the area was known as Tancoia to Europeans for a period of about three decades. In 1662, the Dutch were expelled by the Kingdom of Tungning, founded by Ming loyalists of Koxinga. His son, Zheng Jing, renamed the village Banlian-chiu (Chinese: 萬年州; Pe̍h-ōe-jī: Bān-liân-chiu; lit. 'ten-thousand-year state (zhou)') in 1664.

The name of "Takau" was restored in the late 1670s, when the town expanded drastically with immigrants from mainland China and was kept through Taiwan's cession to the Japanese Empire in 1895. In his 1903 general history of Taiwan, US Consul to Formosa James W. Davidson relates that "Takow" was already a well-known name in English. In 1920, the name was changed to Takao (Japanese: 高雄; after Takao (Kyoto), a place in Ukyō Ward, Kyoto) and administered the area under Takao Prefecture. While the new name had quite a different surface meaning, its pronunciation in Japanese sounded more or less the same as the old name spoken in Hokkien.

After Taiwan was ceded to the Republic of China, the Chinese characters did not change, but adapted to Mandarin pronunciation, thus the official romanization became Kaohsiung (pinyin: Gāoxióng; Wade–Giles: Kao¹-hsiung²), derived from the Wade–Giles romanization of the Mandarin Chinese pronunciation for 高雄.

The name Takau remains the official name of the city in Austronesian languages of Taiwan such as Rukai, although these are not widely spoken in the city. The name also remains popular locally in the naming of businesses, associations, and events.

== History ==
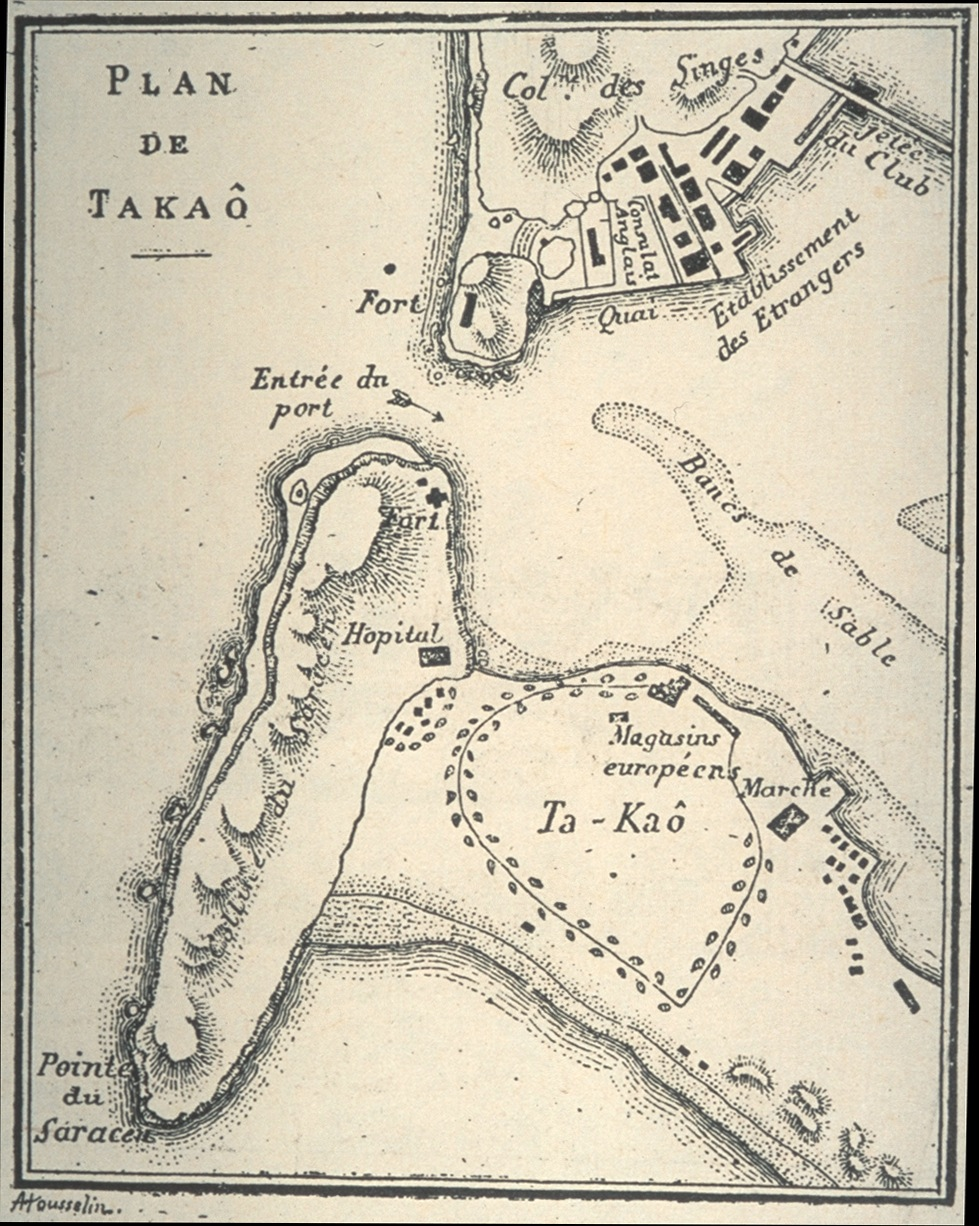
Port of Ta-kau (1893)

The written history of Kaohsiung can be traced back to the early 17th century, through archaeological studies have found signs of human activity in the region from as long as 7,000 years ago. Prior to the 17th century, the region was inhabited by the Makatao people of the Siraya tribe, who settled on what they named Takau Isle (translated to 打狗嶼 by Ming Chinese explorers); "Takau" meaning "bamboo forest" in the aboriginal language.

=== Early history ===
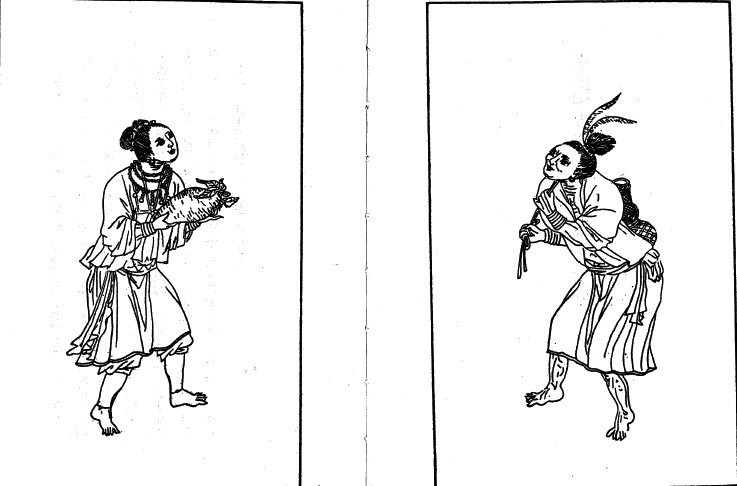
Sketch of the Makatao people during the Qing empire

The earliest evidence of human activity in the Kaohsiung area dates back to roughly 4,700–5,200 years ago. Most of the discovered remnants were located in the hills surrounding Kaohsiung Harbor. Artifacts were found at Shoushan, Longquan Temple, Taoziyuan, Zuoying, Houjing, Fudingjin and Fengbitou. The prehistoric Dapenkeng, Niuchouzi, Dahu, and Niaosong civilizations were known to inhabit the region. Studies of the prehistoric ruins at Longquan Temple have shown that that civilization occurred at roughly the same times as the beginnings of the aboriginal Makatao civilization, suggesting a possible origin for the latter. Unlike some other archaeological sites in the area, the Longquan Temple ruins are relatively well preserved. Prehistoric artifacts discovered have suggested that the ancient Kaohsiung Harbor was originally a lagoon, with early civilizations functioning primarily as Hunter-gatherer societies. Some agricultural tools have also been discovered, suggesting that some agricultural activity was also present.

The first Chinese records of the region were written in 1603 by Chen Di, a member of Ming admiral Shen You-rong's expedition to rid the waters around Taiwan and Penghu of pirates. In his report on the "Eastern Barbarian Lands" (Dong Fan Ji), Chen Di referred to a Ta-kau Isle:

It is unknown when the barbarians (Taiwanese aborigines) arose on this island in the ocean beyond Penghu, but they are present at Keeong Harbor (nowaday's Budai, Chiayi), the bay of Galaw (Anping, Tainan), Laydwawan (Tainan City), Yaw Harbor (Cheting, Kaohsiung), Takau Isle (Kaohsiung City), Little Tamsui (Donggang, Pingtung), Siangkeykaw (Puzi, Chiayi), Gali forest (Jiali District, Tainan), the village of Sabah (Tamsui, Taipei), and Dwabangkang (Bali, New Taipei City).

=== Dutch Formosa ===
Taiwan became a Dutch colony in 1624, after the Dutch East India Company was ejected from Penghu by Ming forces. At the time, Takau was already one of the most important fishing ports in southern Taiwan. The Dutch named the place Tankoya, and the harbor Tancoia. The Dutch missionary François Valentijn named Takau Mountain "Ape Berg", a name that would find its way onto European navigational charts well into the 18th century. Tankoia was located north of Ape's Hill and a few hours south from Tayouan (modern-day Anping, Tainan) by sail. At the time, a wide shallow bay existed there, sufficient for small vessels. However, constant silting changed the coastline.

During this time, Taiwan was divided into five administrative districts, with Takau belonging to the southernmost district. In 1630, the first large scale immigration of Han Chinese to Taiwan began due to famine in Fujian, with merchants and traders from China seeking to purchase hunting licenses from the Dutch or hide out in aboriginal villages to escape authorities in China.

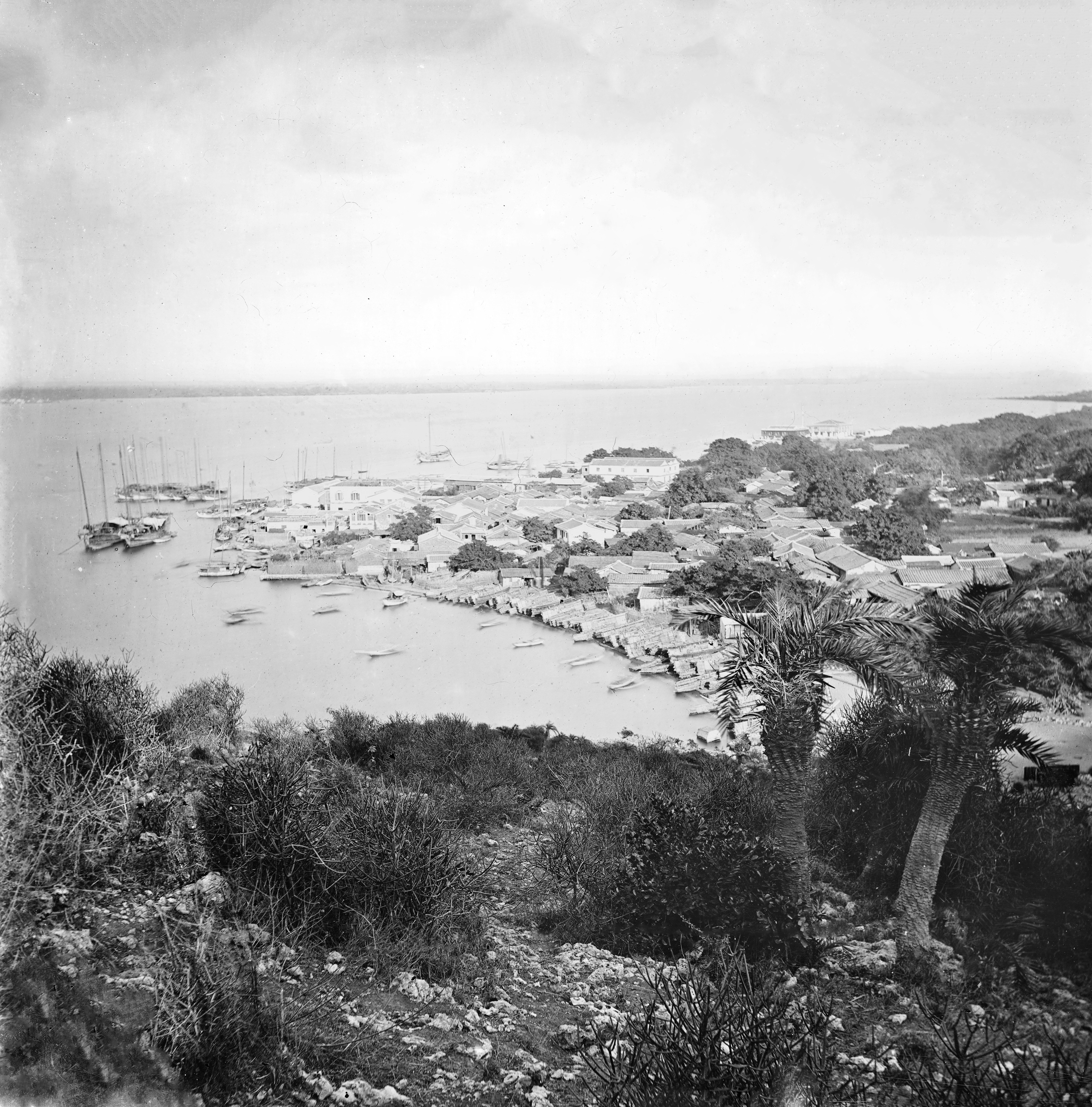
1871 photo of Takow harbour (by John Thomson)

=== Qing dynasty ===
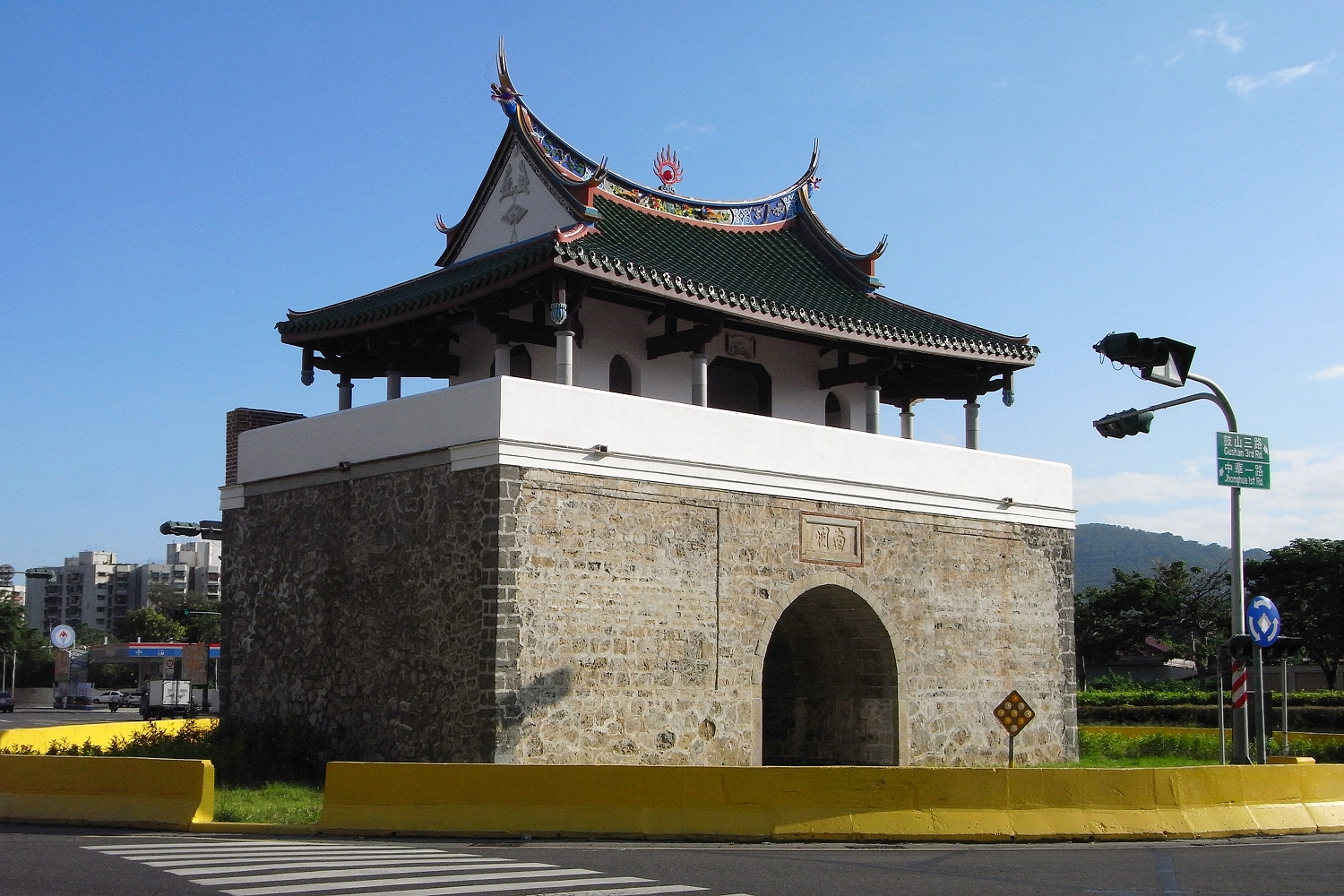
South Gate of Fongshan County

In 1684, the Qing dynasty annexed Taiwan and renamed the town Fongshan County (Chinese: 鳳山縣; pinyin: Fèngshān Xiàn), considering it a part of Taiwan Prefecture. It was first opened as a port during the 1680s and subsequently prospered fairly for generations.

=== Japanese rule ===
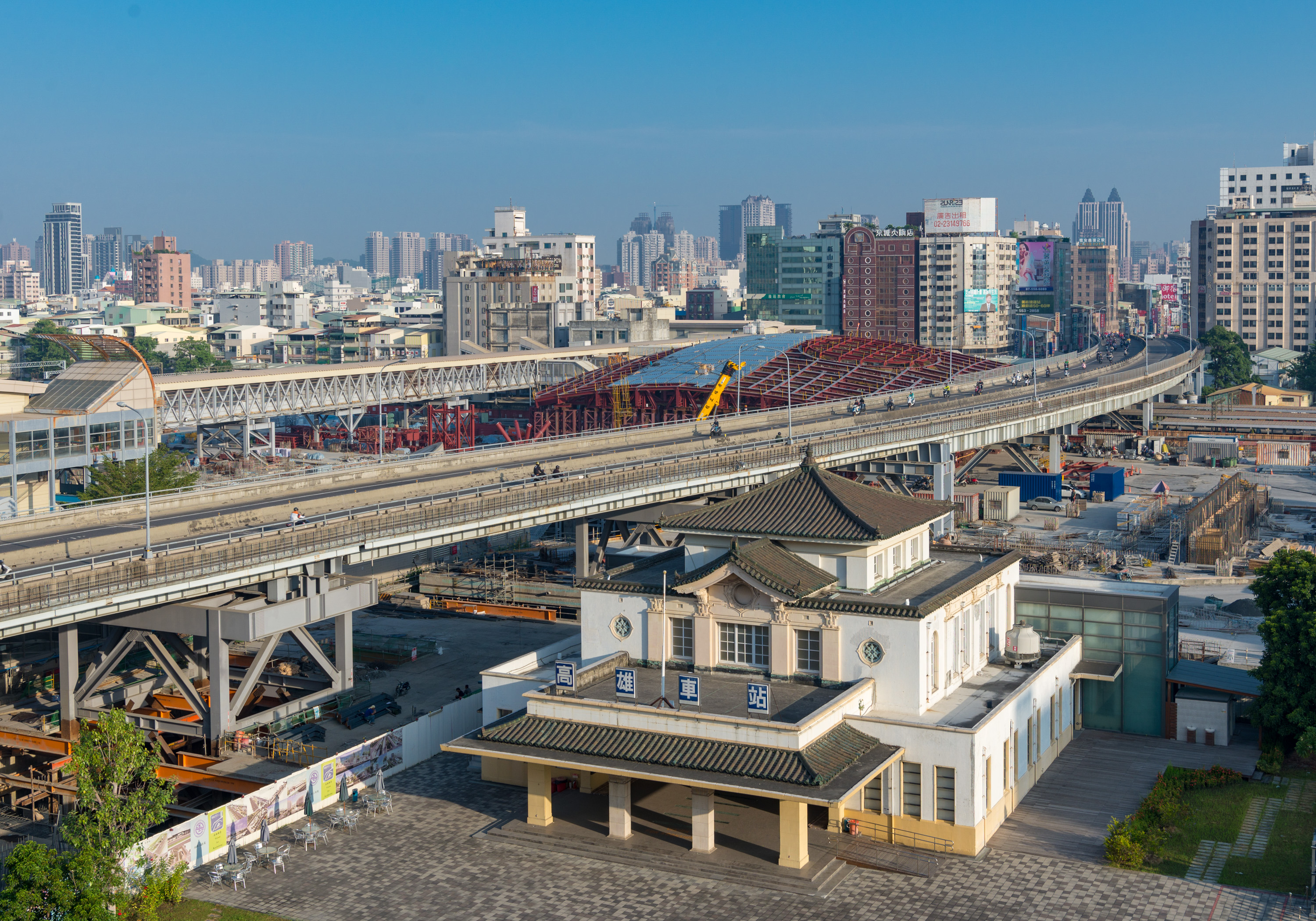
Old Kaohsiung Train Station, built during Japanese rule of Taiwan

In 1895, Taiwan was ceded to Japan as part of the Treaty of Shimonoseki. Administrative control of the city was moved from New Fongshan Castle to the Fongshan Sub-District of Tainan Chō (臺南廳). In November 1901, twenty chō were established in total; Hōzan Chō (鳳山廳) was established nearby. In 1909, Hōzan Chō was abolished, and Takow was merged into Tainan Chō.

In 1920, during the tenure of 8th Governor-General Den Kenjirō, districts were abolished in favor of prefectures. Thus the city was administered as Takao City (高雄市, Takao-shi) under Takao Prefecture.

The Japanese developed Takao, especially the harbor that became the foundation of Kaohsiung to be a port city. Takao was then systematically modernized and connected to the end of North-South Railway. Forming a north–south regional economic corridor from Taipei to Kaohsiung in the 1930s, Japan's Southward Policy set Kaohsiung to become an industrial center. Kaohsiung Harbor was also developed starting from 1894. The city center was relocated several times during the period due to the government's development strategy. Development was initially centered on Ki-au (Chinese: 旗後; Pe̍h-ōe-jī: Kî-āu) region but the government began laying railways, upgrading the harbor, and passing new urban plans. New industries such as refinery, machinery, shipbuilding and cementing were also introduced.

Before and during World War II it handled a growing share of Taiwan's agricultural exports to Japan, and was also a major base for Japan's campaigns in Southeast Asia and the Pacific. Extremely ambitious plans for the construction of a massive modern port were drawn up. Toward the end of the war, the Japanese promoted some industrial development at Kaohsiung, establishing an aluminum industry based on the abundant hydroelectric power produced by the Sun Moon Lake project in the mountains.

The city was heavily bombed by Task Force 38 and FEAF during World War II between 1944 and 1945.

=== Republic of China ===
After control of Taiwan was handed over from Japan to the government of the Republic of China on 25 October 1945, Kaohsiung City and Kaohsiung County were established as a provincial city and a county of Taiwan Province respectively on 25 December 1945. The official romanization of the name came to be "Kaohsiung", based on the Wade–Giles romanization of the Mandarin reading of the kanji name. Kaohsiung City then consisted of 10 districts, which were Gushan, Lianya (renamed "Lingya" in 1952), Nanzih, Cianjin, Cianjhen, Cijin, Sanmin, Sinsing, Yancheng, and Zuoying.

During this time, Kaohsiung developed rapidly. The port, badly damaged in World War II, was restored. It also became a fishing port for boats sailing to Filipino and Indonesian waters. Largely because of its climate, Kaohsiung overtook Keelung as Taiwan's major port. Kaohsiung also surpassed Tainan to become the second largest city of Taiwan in the late 1970s and Kaohsiung City was upgraded from a provincial city to special municipality on 1 July 1979, by the Executive Yuan with a total of 11 districts. The additional district is Siaogang District, which was annexed from Siaogang Township of Kaohsiung County.

The Kaohsiung Incident, where the government suppressed a commemoration of International Human Rights Day, occurred on 10 December 1979. Since then, Kaohsiung gradually grew into a political center of the Pan-Green population of Taiwan, in opposition to Taipei where the majority population is Kuomintang supporters.

Map of Kaohsiung City before and after 25 December 2010

On 25 December 2010, Kaohsiung City merged with Kaohsiung County to form a larger special municipality with administrative centers in Lingya District and Fongshan District.

On 31 July 2014, a series of gas explosions occurred in the Cianjhen and Lingya Districts of the city, killing 31 and injuring more than 300. Five roads were destroyed in an area of nearly 20 km^{2} (7.7 sq mi) near the city center. It was the largest gas explosion in Taiwan's modern history.

== Geography ==
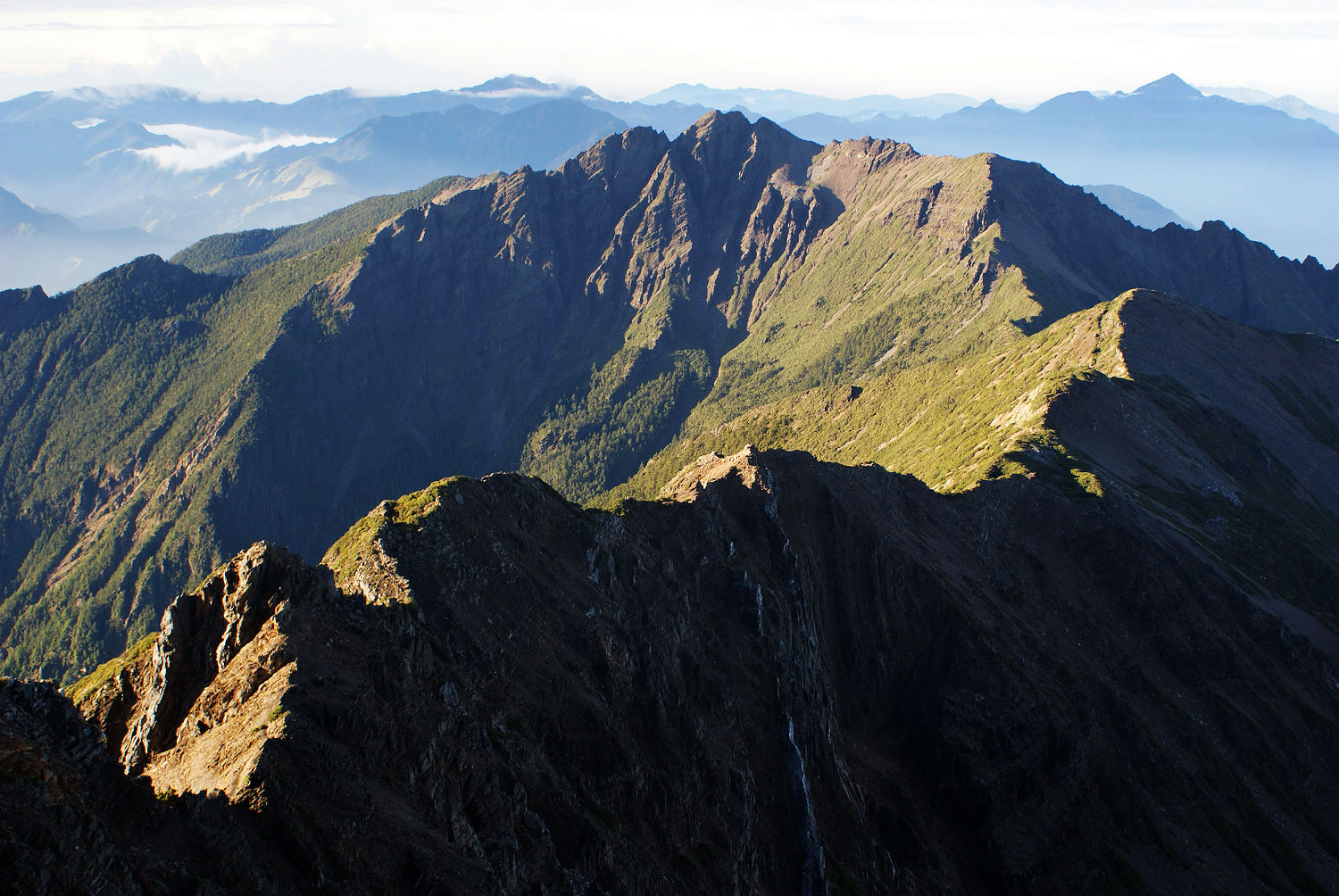
Jade Mountain South Peak

The city sits on the southwestern coast of Taiwan facing the Taiwan Strait, bordering Tainan City to the northwest, Chiayi and Nantou County to the north, Taitung County to its east and Pingtung County to the south and southeast. The downtown areas are centered on Kaohsiung Harbor with Cijin Island on the other side of the harbor acting as a natural breakwater. The Love River (Ai River) flows into the harbor through the Old City and downtown. Zuoying Military Harbor lies to the north of Kaohsiung Harbor and the city center. Kaohsiung's natural landmarks include Ape Hill and Mount Banping.

=== Climate ===
Kaohsiung

Climate chart (precipitation, max. and min. temperature)
J	F	M	A	M	J	J	A	S	O	N	D
19 24 16	18 25 17	32 27 20	68 29 23	202 31 25	416 32 26	377 33 27	512 32 26	225 32 26	53 30 24	26 28 22	19 25 18
- █ Average max. and min. temperatures in °C
- █ Precipitation totals in mm
Imperial conversion
J	F	M	A	M	J	J	A	S	O	N	D
0.8 76 61	0.7 77 63	1.3 81 67	2.7 85 73	8 88 77	16 90 79	15 91 80	20 90 79	8.8 89 79	2.1 86 76	1 83 71	0.8 78 64
- █ Average max. and min. temperatures in °F
- █ Precipitation totals in inches

Located about a degree south of the Tropic of Cancer, Kaohsiung has a tropical savanna climate (Köppen Aw), near to a tropical monsoon climate (Köppen Am) with monthly mean temperatures between 20 and 29 °C (68 and 84 °F) and relative humidity ranging between 71 and 81%.

Kaohsiung's warm climate is very much dictated by its low latitude and its exposure to warm sea temperatures year-round, with the Kuroshio Current passing by the coast of southern Taiwan, and the Central Mountain Range on the northeast blocking out the cool northeastern winds during the winter. The city, therefore, has a noticeably warmer climate than nearby cities located at similar latitudes such as Hong Kong, Guangzhou as well as various cities further south in northern Vietnam, such as Hanoi. Although the climate is classified as tropical, Kaohsiung has a defined cooler season unlike most other cities in Asia classified with this climate but located closer to the equator such as Singapore or Manila. Daily maximum temperature typically exceeds 30 °C (86 °F) during the warmer season (April to November) and 25 °C (77 °F) during the cooler season (December to March), with the exception when cold fronts strike during the winter months, when the daily mean temperature of the city can drop between 10 and 12 °C depending on the strength of the cold front. Also, besides the high temperatures occurring during the usual summer months, daytime temperatures of inland districts of the city can often exceed 33 °C (91 °F) from mid-March to late April before the onset of the monsoon season, with clear skies and southwesterly airflows. Average annual rainfall is around 1,885 mm (74.2 in), focused primarily from June to August. At more than 2,210 hours of bright sunshine, the city is one of the sunniest areas in Taiwan.

The sea temperature of Kaohsiung Harbor remains above 22 °C (72 °F) year-round, the second highest of Southern Taiwan after Liuqiu Island. According to recent records, the average temperature of the city has risen around 1 degree Celsius over the past three decades, from about 24.2 °C (75.6 °F) in 1983 to around 25.2 °C (77.4 °F) by 2012.

Climate data for Kaohsiung City (1991–2020 normals, extremes 1931–present）
Month	Jan	Feb	Mar	Apr	May	Jun	Jul	Aug	Sep	Oct	Nov	Dec	Year
Record high °C (°F)	31.6 (88.9)	32.5 (90.5)	33.2 (91.8)	35.4 (95.7)	36.4 (97.5)	37.2 (99.0)	37.1 (98.8)	36.1 (97.0)	37.6 (99.7)	34.8 (94.6)	33.0 (91.4)	34.4 (93.9)	37.6 (99.7)
Mean daily maximum °C (°F)	24.2 (75.6)	25.0 (77.0)	27.0 (80.6)	29.3 (84.7)	31.0 (87.8)	32.1 (89.8)	32.7 (90.9)	32.1 (89.8)	31.8 (89.2)	30.1 (86.2)	28.1 (82.6)	25.3 (77.5)	29.1 (84.3)
Daily mean °C (°F)	19.7 (67.5)	20.7 (69.3)	23.0 (73.4)	25.7 (78.3)	27.8 (82.0)	28.9 (84.0)	29.4 (84.9)	28.9 (84.0)	28.5 (83.3)	26.9 (80.4)	24.5 (76.1)	21.2 (70.2)	25.4 (77.8)
Mean daily minimum °C (°F)	16.2 (61.2)	17.2 (63.0)	19.7 (67.5)	22.8 (73.0)	25.2 (77.4)	26.3 (79.3)	26.7 (80.1)	26.3 (79.3)	25.9 (78.6)	24.4 (75.9)	21.6 (70.9)	17.9 (64.2)	22.5 (72.5)
Record low °C (°F)	5.7 (42.3)	6.6 (43.9)	6.8 (44.2)	10.3 (50.5)	17.3 (63.1)	19.0 (66.2)	20.0 (68.0)	20.7 (69.3)	19.5 (67.1)	14.7 (58.5)	10.2 (50.4)	4.4 (39.9)	4.4 (39.9)
Average precipitation mm (inches)	19.1 (0.75)	17.7 (0.70)	32.3 (1.27)	68.4 (2.69)	202.2 (7.96)	416.2 (16.39)	377.2 (14.85)	512.4 (20.17)	224.5 (8.84)	53.4 (2.10)	25.6 (1.01)	19.2 (0.76)	1,968.2 (77.49)
Average precipitation days (≥ 0.1 mm)	3.2	3.2	3.6	5.4	6.2	12.9	13.2	16.7	10.1	4.2	2.8	2.8	84.3
Average relative humidity (%)	71.6	71.8	71.9	74.2	76.6	79.0	78.0	79.9	77.5	74.2	73.1	71.6	75.0
Mean monthly sunshine hours	177.0	176.0	194.7	197.2	207.7	215.0	220.7	189.3	188.6	191.9	166.5	157.2	2,281.8
Source: Central Weather Bureau

=== Cityscape ===
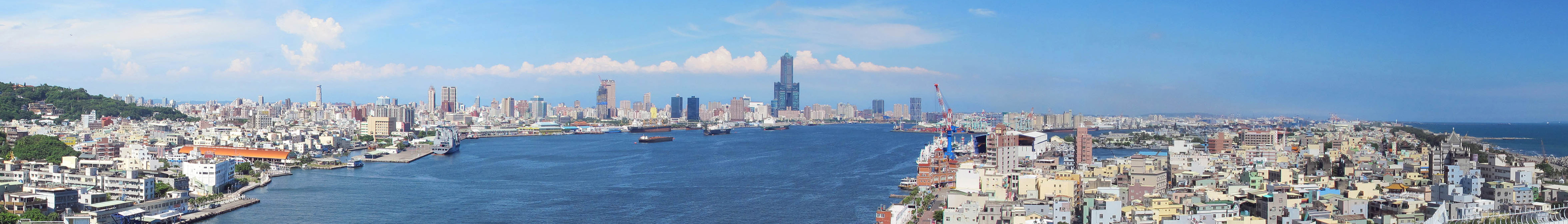
Kaohsiung's skyline viewed from Kaohsiung Lighthouse in Cijin District, with the 85 Sky Tower right of center.

== Demographics ==
Historical population
Year	Pop.	±%
1950	714,821	—
1955	877,264	+22.7%
1960	1,085,311	+23.7%
1965	1,308,293	+20.5%
1970	1,658,852	+26.8%
1975	1,942,569	+17.1%
1980	2,202,768	+13.4%
1985	2,379,610	+8.0%
1990	2,505,986	+5.3%
1995	2,619,947	+4.5%
2000	2,725,267	+4.0%
2005	2,760,180	+1.3%
2010	2,773,483	+0.5%
2015	2,778,918	+0.2%
2020	2,765,932	−0.5%
2025	2,718,545	−1.7%
source : 1. 高雄縣政府 1951; 2. 高雄縣政府 1963; 3. 高雄縣政府 1974; 4. 高雄市政府 1981; 5. "縣市人口按性別及五齡組(63)". 內政部戶政司.

As of August 2025, Kaohsiung has a population of 2,722,984 people, making it the third-largest city after New Taipei and Taichung, and a population density of 922.47 people per square kilometer. Within the city, Fongshan District is the most populated district with a population of 354,455 people, while Sinsing District is the most densely populated district with a population density of 25,052 people per square kilometer.

View source data.

=== Ethnic composition ===
==== Han Chinese ====
As in most Taiwanese cities or counties, the majority of the population are Han Chinese. The Chinese are divided into 3 subgroups: Hoklo, Hakka, and Waishengren. The Hoklo and Waishengren mostly live in flatland townships and the city centre, while the majority of the Hakka population lives in the suburbs or rural townships of the northeastern hills.

==== Indigenous peoples ====
The indigenous peoples of Kaohsiung, who belong to various ethnic groups that speak languages belonging to the Austronesian language family, live mostly in the mountain indigenous district such as Taoyuan or Namasia. The main indigenous groups in the city include the Bunun, Rukai, Saaroa and the Kanakanavu.

==== Other ethnicities ====
As of December 2010, Kaohsiung hosts around 21,000 foreign spouses. Around 12,353 are Mainland Chinese, 4,244 are Vietnamese, around 800 are Japanese and Indonesians, and around 4,000 are other Asians or foreigners from Europe or America.

As of April 2013, Kaohsiung hosts 35,074 foreign workers who mainly work as factory workers or foreign maids (not including foreign specialists such as teachers and other professionals). About half of them are Indonesians, with the other half being workers from other Southeast Asian countries, mainly from Vietnam, the Philippines or Thailand.

== Economy ==
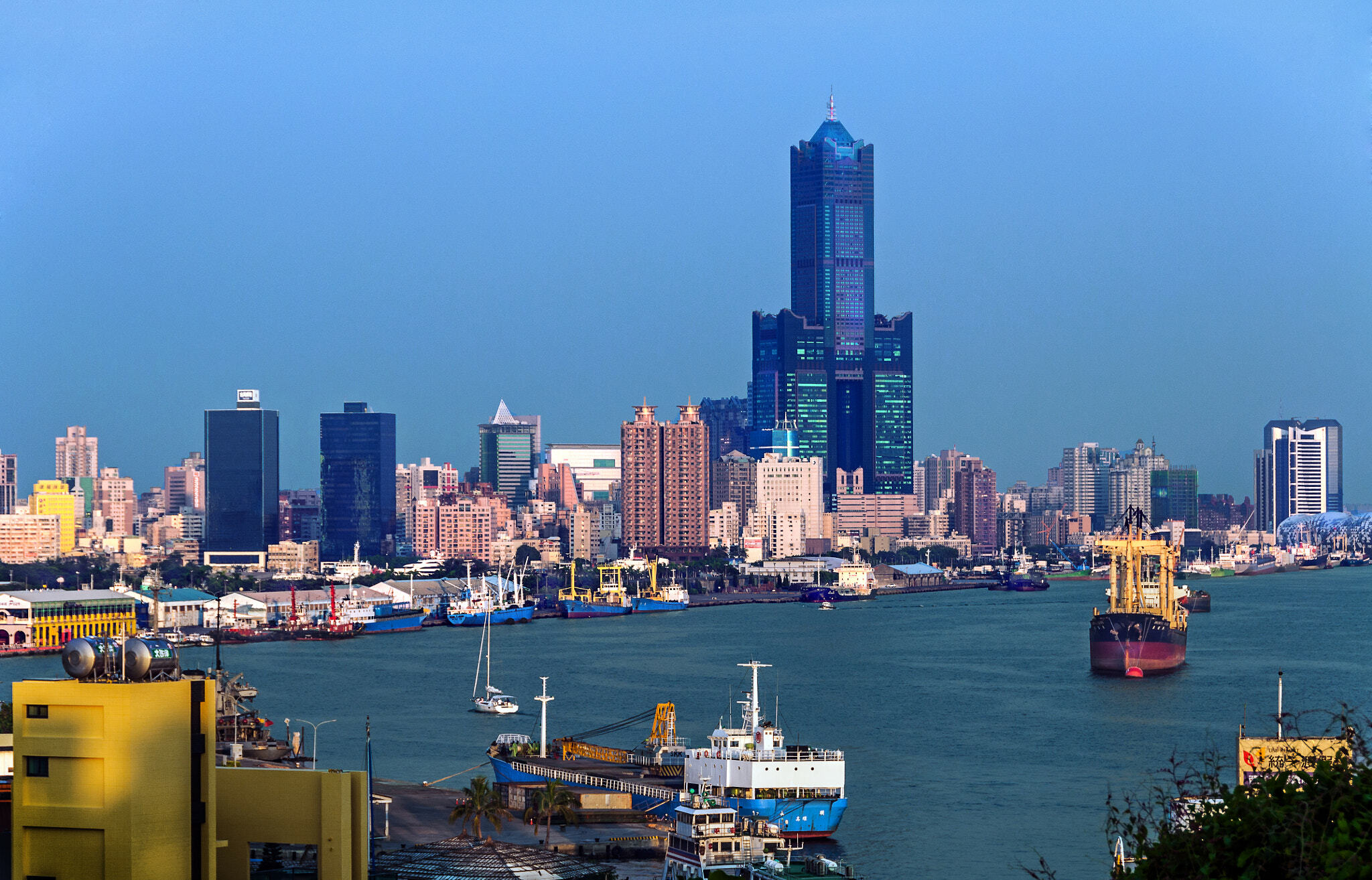
Kaohsiung Harbor

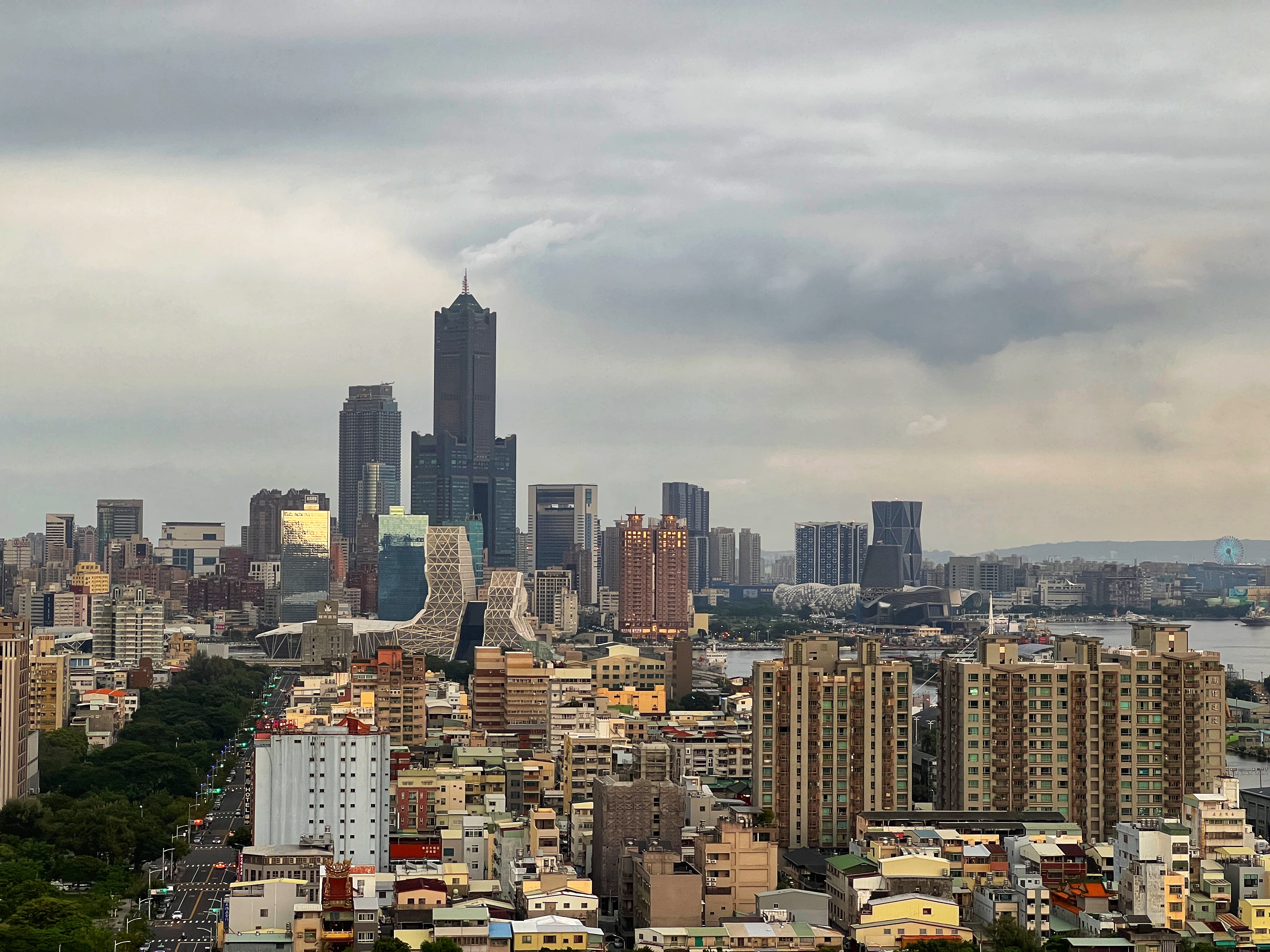
The skyline of downtown Kaohsiung

Kaohsiung is a major international port and industrial city in the southwest of Taiwan. As an exporting center, Kaohsiung serves the agricultural interior of southern Taiwan, as well as the mountains of the southeast. Major raw material exports include rice, sugar, bananas, pineapples, peanuts (groundnuts) and citrus fruits. The 2,200 ha (5,400-acre) Linhai Industrial Park, on the waterfront, was completed in the mid-1970s and includes a steel mill, shipyard, petrochemical complex, and other industries. The city has an oil refinery, aluminum and cement works, fertilizer factories, sugar refineries, brick and tile works, canning factories, salt-manufacturing factories, and papermaking plants. Designated an export-processing zone in the late 1970s, Kaohsiung also attracted foreign investment to process locally purchased raw materials for export.

In 2020, Kaohsiung's land reclamation project in the Port of Kaohsiung was completed, equivalent to 16 of Taipei's Daan Forest Parks.

The Kaohsiung Harbor Bureau plans to buy 49 hectares of the reclaimed land to establish a solar energy industrial district that would be in the harbor's free trade zone.

The gross domestic product (GDP) in nominal terms of Kaohsiung City is estimated to be around US$45 billion, and US$90 billion for the metropolitan region. As of 2008, the GDP per capita in nominal terms was approximately US$24,000.

Despite early success and heavy governmental investment, the city suffers from the economic North–South divide in Taiwan, which continues to be the center of political debate. There has been public aims to shift the local economy towards tourism and cultural industries, with projects such as Pier-2 Art Center, National Kaohsiung Center for the Arts and Kaohsiung Music Center.

=== Agriculture ===
The main agricultural crops in Kaohsiung are vegetables, fruits and rice with a total arable land of 473 km^{2}, which accounts to 16% of the total area of the municipality. Kaohsiung has the highest production of guava, jujube and lychee in Taiwan. The main livestock are chicken, dairy cattle, deer, duck, goose, pigs and sheep. The total annual agricultural income in Kaohsiung is NT$24.15 billion.

=== Future investment ===
Investment inflow of returned-Taiwanese merchandisers from China due to US-China trade war.
	Numbers of merchants	Investment amounts of money in billions NTD	Jobs-created
Taoyuan City	39	154.0	15000
Taichung City	35	133.8	10000
Kaohsiung City	20	146.0	10000
Tainan City	23	123.0	7500
New Taipei City	9	21.0	2650
Taipei City	3	4.0	600

== Culture ==
=== Tourism ===
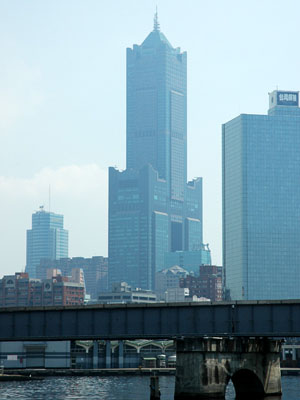
The 85 Sky Tower seen from the Love River

Main landmarks of Kaohsiung city include the 85 Sky Tower, the Ferris wheel of the Kaohsiung Dream Mall, the Kaohsiung Arena and Port of Kaohsiung. The newly developed city is also known for having a large number of shopping streets, organized night markets and newly developed leisure parks such as the Pier-2 Art Center, E-DA Theme Park, Metropolitan Park, the Kaohsiung Museum of Fine Arts, the National Kaohsiung Center for the Arts and SKM Park.

Natural attractions of the city include Shoushan (Monkey mountain), the Love River, Cijin Island, Sizihwan, the Dapingding Tropical Botanical Garden and Yushan National Park at the northeastern tip of the city. The city also features various historical attractions such as the Old City of Zuoying, a historical town built during the early 17th century, the Former British Consulate at Takao built during the late 19th century, and various sugar and crop factories built under Japanese rule.

==== Natural attractions ====
Kaohsiung city includes a wide range of different natural attractions due to its large size and geographical variation, as it is bordered by the Central Mountain Range in the northeast and the warm South China Sea to the west and southwest. The year-round warm climate allows coral reefs to grow along the coasts around Kaohsiung Harbor, with Shoushan Mountain being a small mountain completely made up of coral reefs and calcium carbonate, while the mountainous districts in the northeast include Taiwan's highest mountain, Yushan. Other notable natural attractions include the Mount Banping, Lotus Pond, and Dongsha Atoll National Park, which is currently inaccessible by the public due to military occupation.

==== Historical sites ====
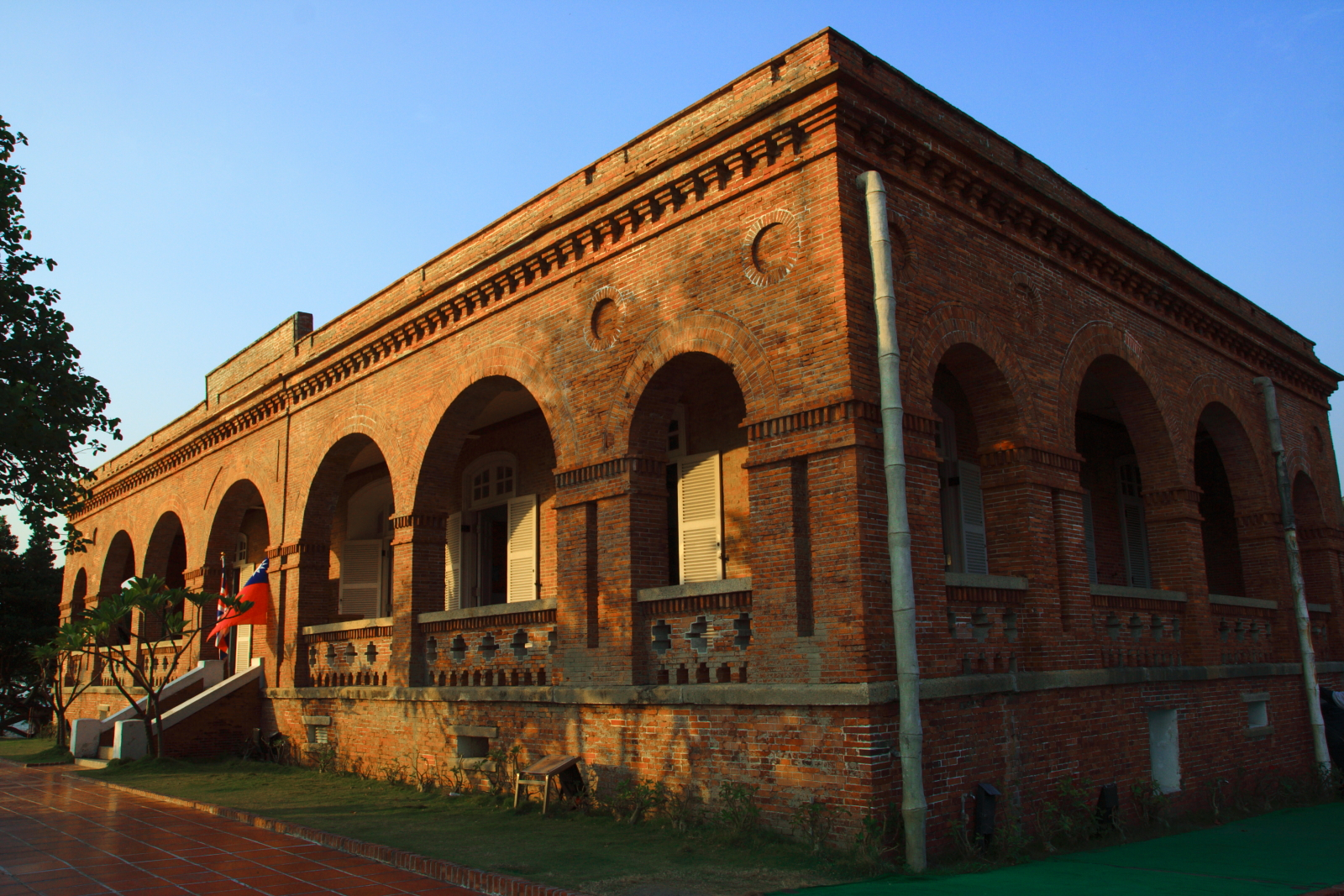
Former British Consulate at Takao

A large number of historical sites and monuments were left in the city after the colonization of the Dutch in the 17th century, the Qing dynasty during the 18th and 19th century and the Japanese empire from the late 19th century to the mid 20th century. The city government has protected various sites and monuments from further damage and many have been opened to the public since the early 1980s. Notable historical sites include the Cemetery of Zhenghaijun, Fengshan Longshan Temple, Former British Consulate at Takao, Former Dinglinzihbian Police Station, Meinong Cultural and Creative Center, Former Sanhe Bank, and the Kaohsiung Lighthouse, one of the oldest lighthouses of the city.

==== Museums ====
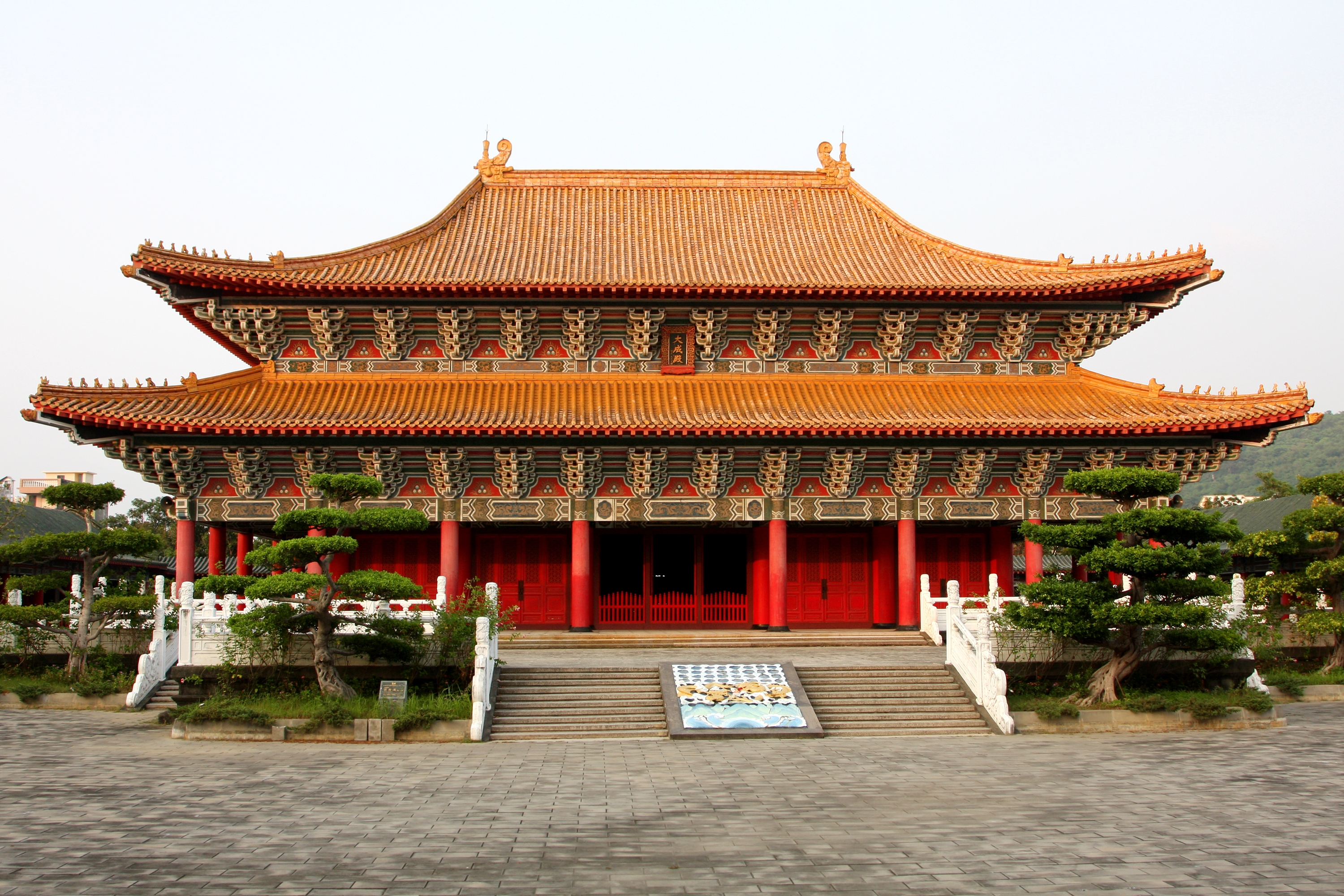
Confucius Temple of Kaohsiung

Kaohsiung is home to many museums, including the Chung Li-ho Museum, Cijin Shell Museum, Fo Guang Shan Buddha Museum, Jiasian Petrified Fossil Museum, Kaohsiung Astronomical Museum, Kaohsiung Hakka Cultural Museum, Kaohsiung Harbor Museum, Kaohsiung Museum of Fine Arts, Kaohsiung Museum of History, Kaohsiung Museum of Labor, Kaohsiung Vision Museum, Meinong Hakka Culture Museum, National Science and Technology Museum, Republic of China Air Force Museum, Soya-Mixed Meat Museum, Taiwan Pineapple Museum, Taiwan Sugar Museum, Takao Railway Museum, Xiaolin Pingpu Cultural Museum and YM Museum of Marine Exploration Kaohsiung.

==== Parks and zoos ====
As the largest municipality in Taiwan, Kaohsiung has a number of newly built leisure areas and parks. Notable parks or pavilions in the city include the Central Park, Siaogangshan Skywalk Park, Fo Guang Shan Monastery, the Dragon and Tiger Pagodas, Spring and Autumn Pavilions, the Love Pier, Singuang Ferry Wharf and Kaohsiung Fisherman's Wharf. Notable zoo in the city includes the Kaohsiung City Shousan Zoo.

==== Other ====
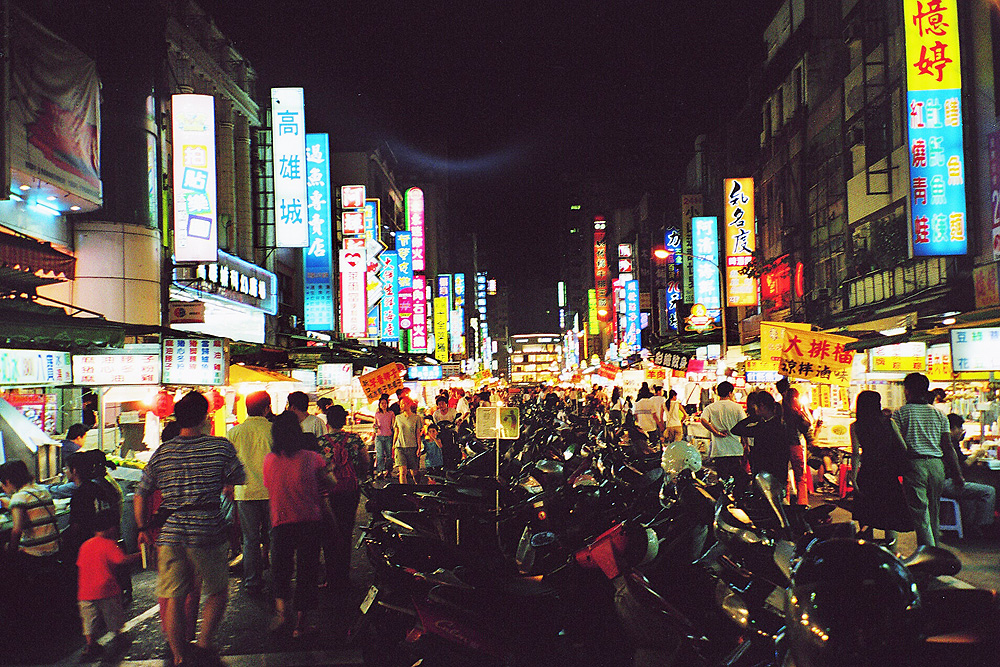
Liuhe Night Market

Kaohsiung is home to many night markets, such as Jin-Zuan Night Market, Kaisyuan Night Market, Liuhe Night Market, Rueifong Night Market and Zhonghua Street Night Market. Other attractions include the Cijin Tianhou Temple, Dome of Light of Kaohsiung MRT's Formosa Boulevard Station, the Kaohsiung Mosque and the Tower of Light of Sanmin District.

Traditional "wet" markets have long been the source of meat, fish, and produce for many residents. With the arrival of Western-style supermarkets in the 1980s and 1990s, such markets have encountered fierce competition. In 1989, the global leader in hypermarkets, Carrefour, entered Asia, opening its first store in Kaohsiung. Due to the success of its Taiwan operation, the French retailer expanded throughout the country and Asia. Jean-Luc Chéreau, the general manager in Taiwan from 1993 to 1999, used this newfound understanding of Chinese culture and ways of doing business with Chinese customers to lead its China expansion starting in 1999. As of February 2020, Carrefour has opened 137 hypermarkets and supermarkets in Taiwan. Despite the fierce competition from "Westernized" supermarkets, Taiwan's traditional markets and mom-and-pop stores remain "one of the most popular retail formats for many Asian families when they purchase daily food items and basic household goods."

=== Languages ===
The majority of those living in Kaohsiung can communicate in both Taiwanese Hokkien and Mandarin. Some of the elderly who grew up during the Japanese colonization of Taiwan can communicate in Japanese, while most of the younger population have basic English skills.

Since the spread of Standard Chinese after the Nationalist Government retreated to Taiwan in 1949, Hakka Chinese and various Formosan languages are gradually no longer spoken with the new generation and many Formosan languages are therefore classified as moribund or endangered languages by the United Nations. Nowadays, only elder Hakka people mostly living in Meinong, Liouguei, Shanlin and Jiasian districts can communicate in Hakka and elder Taiwanese aborigines living mostly in the rural districts of Namasia and Taoyuan can communicate with the aboriginal languages. The Taiwanese government has established special affairs committees for both the Aboriginals and the Hakkas to protect their language, culture, and minority rights.

=== Arts ===
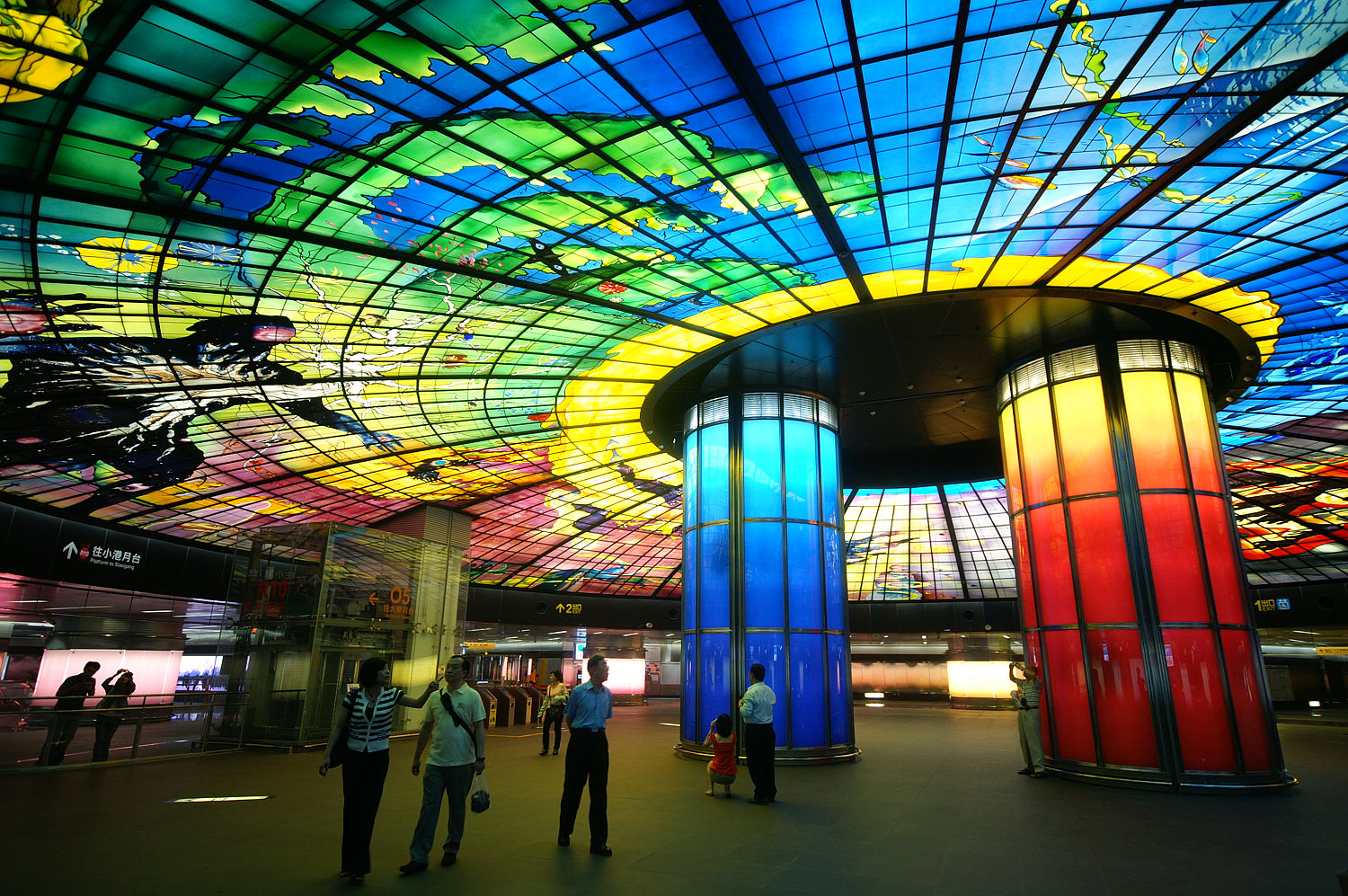
The Dome of Light at Formosa Boulevard Station of Kaohsiung MRT

The "Dome of Light" in the concourse of Formosa Boulevard Station of Kaohsiung MRT is one of the world's largest public glass works of art. The city also has the Urban Spotlight Arcade spanning along the street in Cianjin District. Acknowledged as the largest performance arts center under one roof in the world Weiwuying (the National Kaohsiung Centre for the Arts), opened in 2018. The center was designed by Mecanoo.

== Religion ==
Religion in Taiwan (Government statistics, 2005)
1. Buddhism (35.1%)
2. Taoism (33.0%)
3. Christianity (3.90%)
4. Yiguandao (3.50%)
5. Tiandism (2.20%)
6. Miledadao (1.10%)
7. Zailiism (0.80%)
8. Other or undeclared (2.40%)
9. Non-religious (18.7%)

The religious population of Kaohsiung may be divided into five main religious groups: Buddhists, Taoists, Muslim and Christians (Catholics and Protestants). As of 2015, Kaohsiung City has 1,481 temples, the second highest in Taiwan after Tainan. Kaohsiung also has 306 churches.

=== Buddhism ===
Buddhism is one of the major religions in Taiwan, with over 35% of Taiwan's population identifying as Buddhists. The same applies to Kaohsiung city. Kaohsiung also hosts the largest Buddhist temple in Taiwan, the Fo Guang Shan Monastery with its Fo Guang Shan Buddha Museum. There are also other famous Buddhist temples such as Fengshan Longshan Temple and Hong Fa Temple.

=== Taoism ===
Around 33% of the Taiwanese population are Taoists, making it the second largest religion of Taiwan. Most people who believe in Taoism also ascribe to Buddhism at the same time, as the differences and boundaries between the two religions are not always clear. Many residents of the area also worship the sea goddess known as Tian Shang Sheng Mu (天上聖母) or Mazu, who is variously syncretized as a Taoist immortal or embodiment of the bodhisattva Guanyin. Her temple on Cijin Island, Chi Jin Mazu Temple, is the oldest in the city, with its original bamboo-and-thatch structure first opened in 1673. The area surrounding it formed the center of the city's early settlement. There are also other prominent Taoist temples such as Fengshan Tiangong Temple, dedicated to the Jade Emperor, Cih Ji Palace, dedicated to Bao Sheng Da Di, Qing Shui Temple, dedicated to Qing Shui Zu Shi and Gushan Daitian Temple dedicated to Wang Ye worship.

=== Christianity ===
Christianity is a minority religion in Taiwan. It was first brought onto the island when the Dutch and Spanish colonized Taiwan during the 17th century, mostly to the aboriginals. Kaohsiung currently hosts around 56,000 Christians.

=== Islam ===
Besides the majority population of Buddhists and Taoists, Kaohsiung also includes a rather tiny population of Muslims. During the Chinese Civil War, some 20,000 Muslims, mostly soldiers and civil servants, fled mainland China with the Kuomintang government to Taiwan. During the 1980s, another few thousand Muslims from Myanmar and Thailand, who are mostly descendants of Nationalist soldiers who fled Yunnan as a result of the communist takeover, migrated to Taiwan in search of a better life, resulting in an increase of Muslim population within the country. More recently, with the rise of Indonesian workers working in Taiwan, an estimated number of 88,000 Indonesian Muslims currently live in the country, in addition to the existing 53,000 Taiwanese Muslims. Combining all demographics, Taiwan hosts around 140,000 Muslims, with around 25,000 living in Kaohsiung. Kaohsiung Mosque is the largest mosque in Kaohsiung and the main gathering site of Muslims within the city.

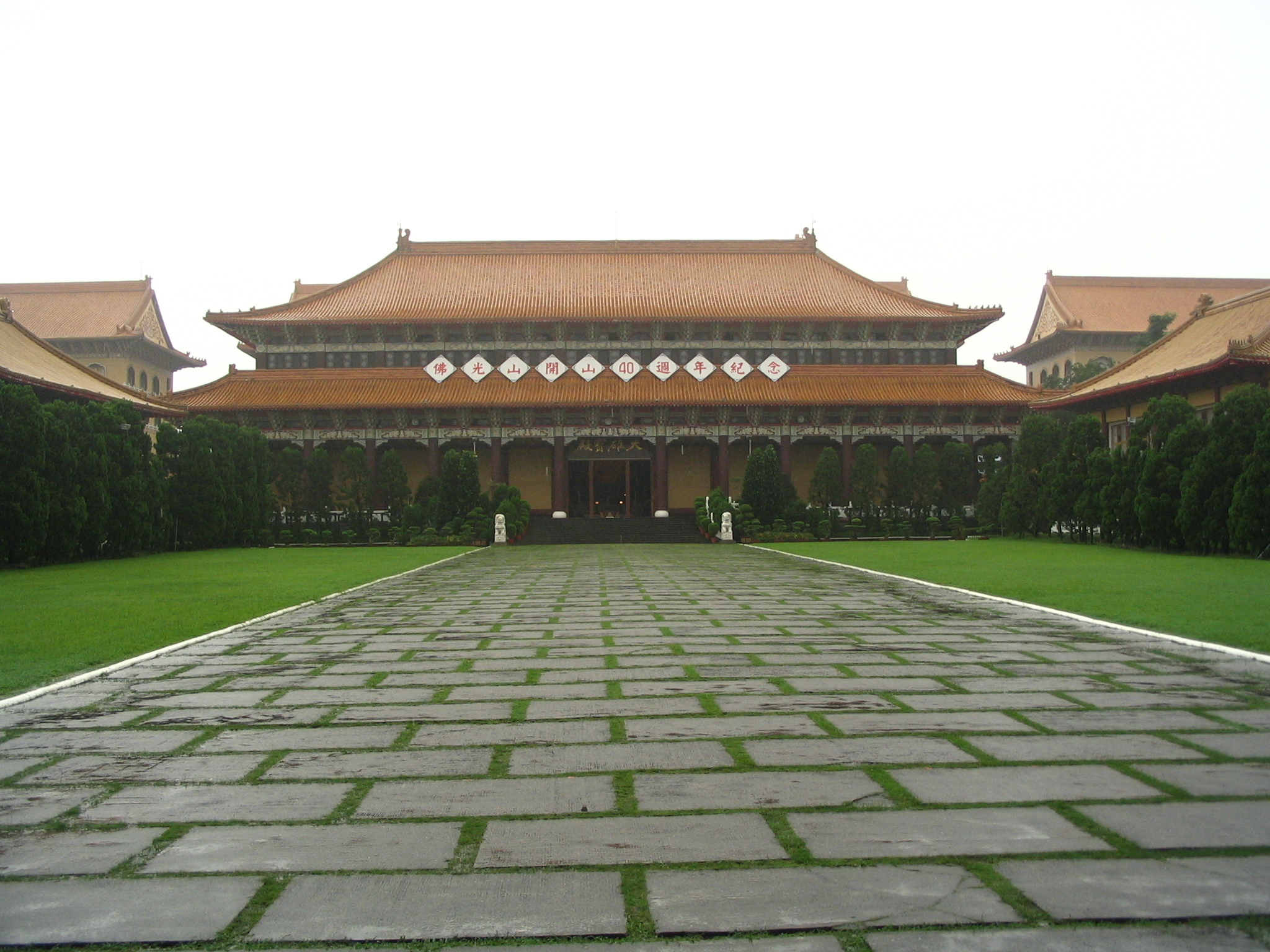
Foguangshan Temple

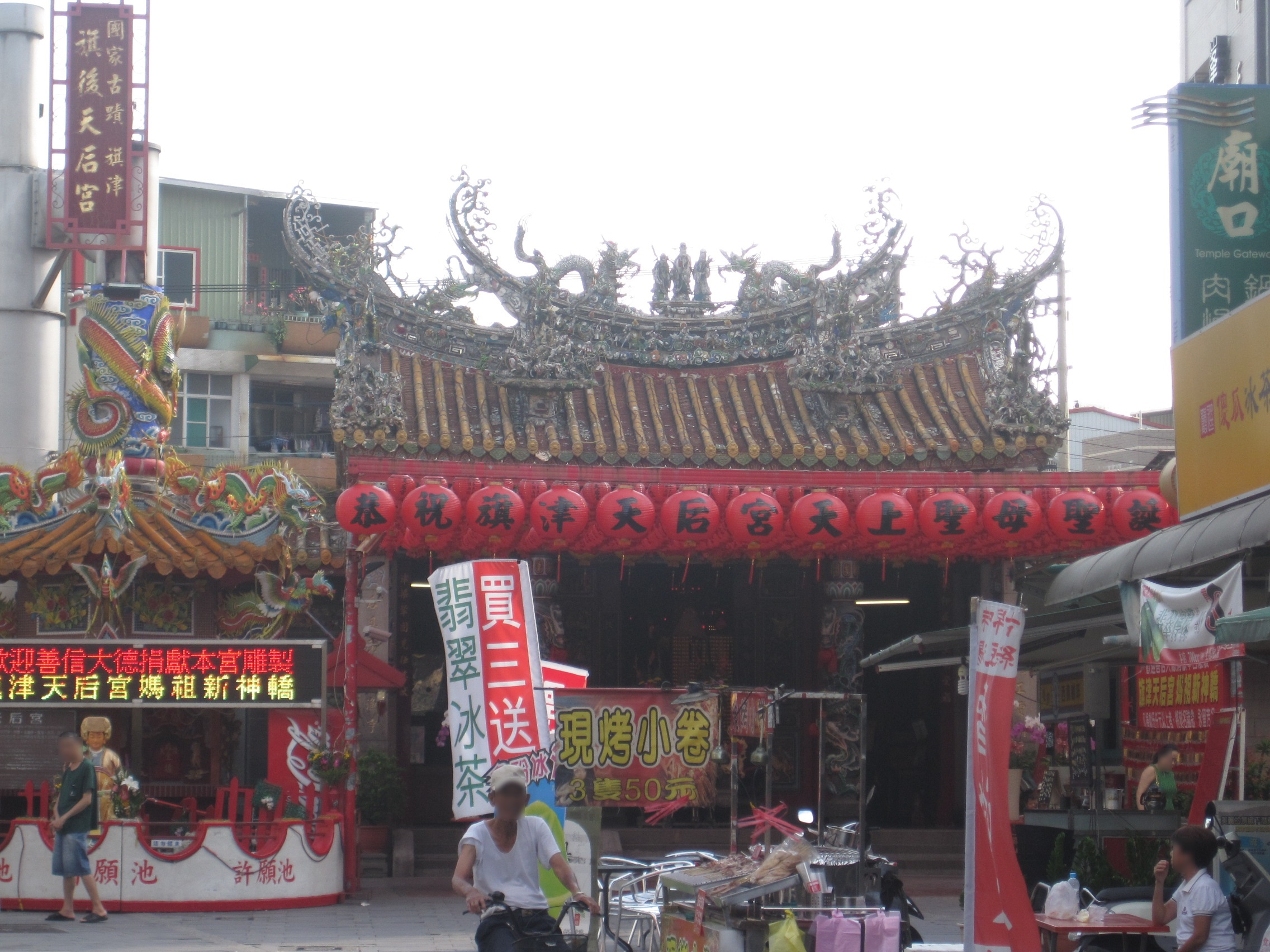
Cijing Tianhou Temple

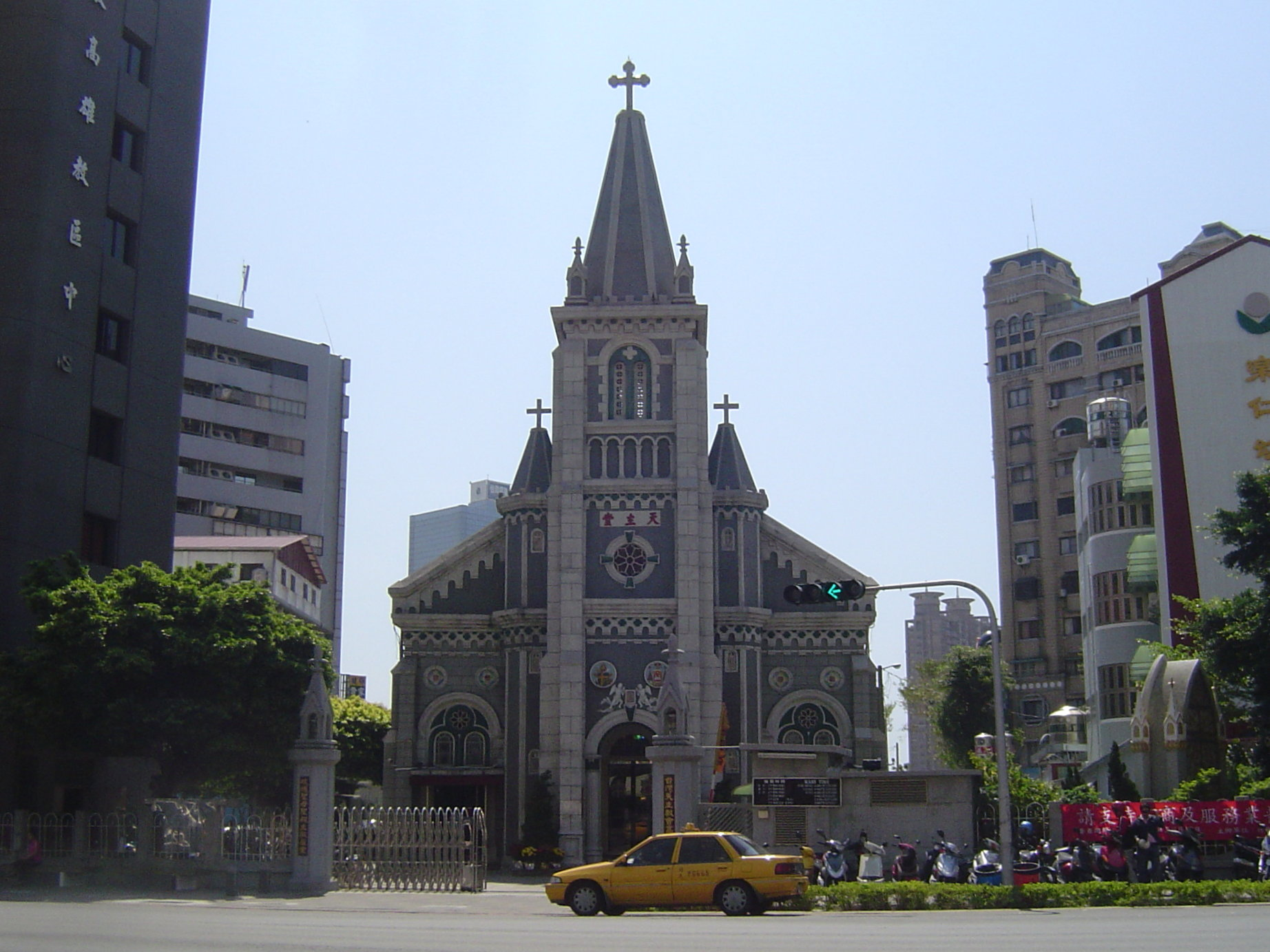
Holy Rosary Cathedral

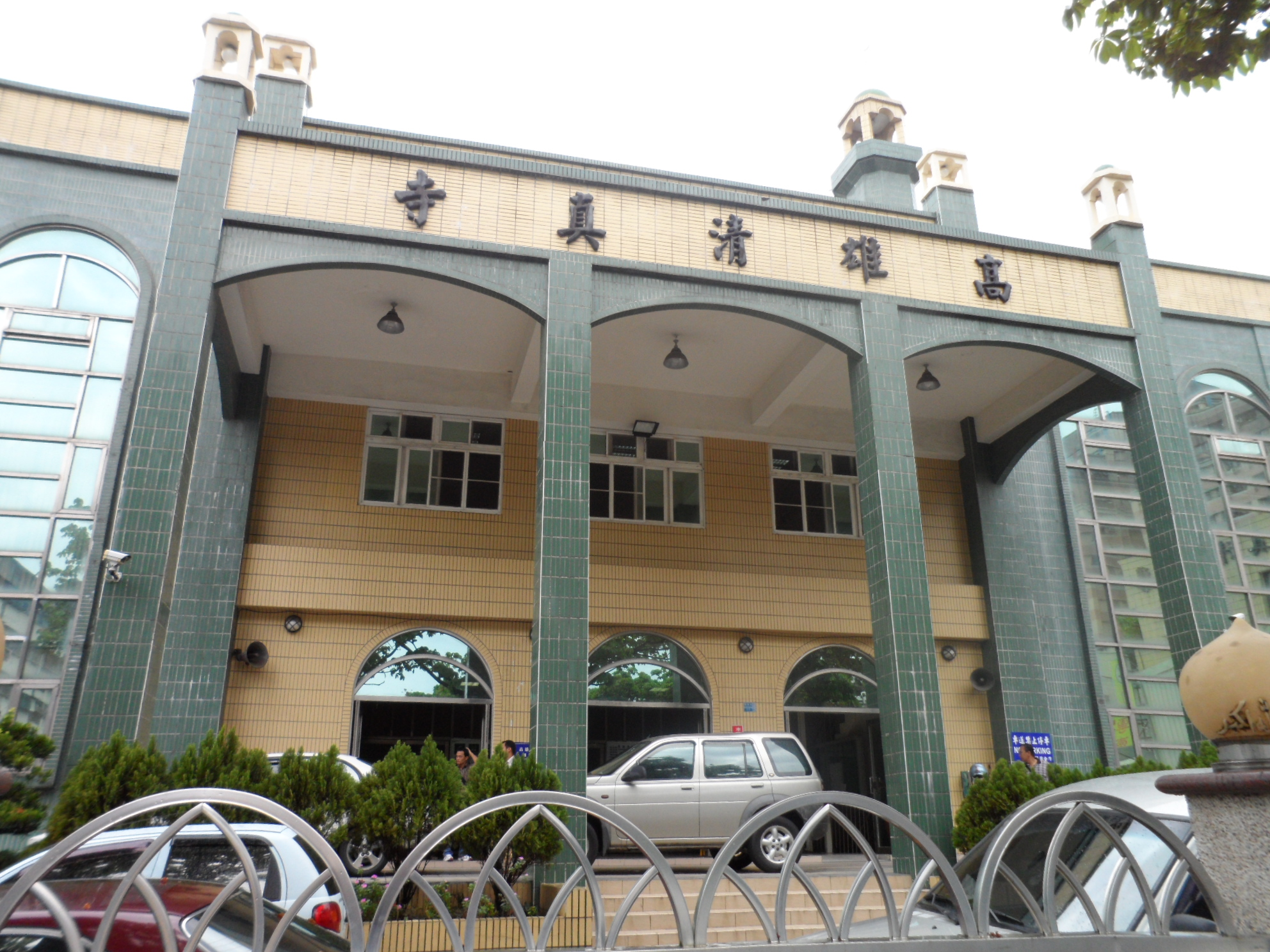
Kaohsiung Mosque

== Politics ==
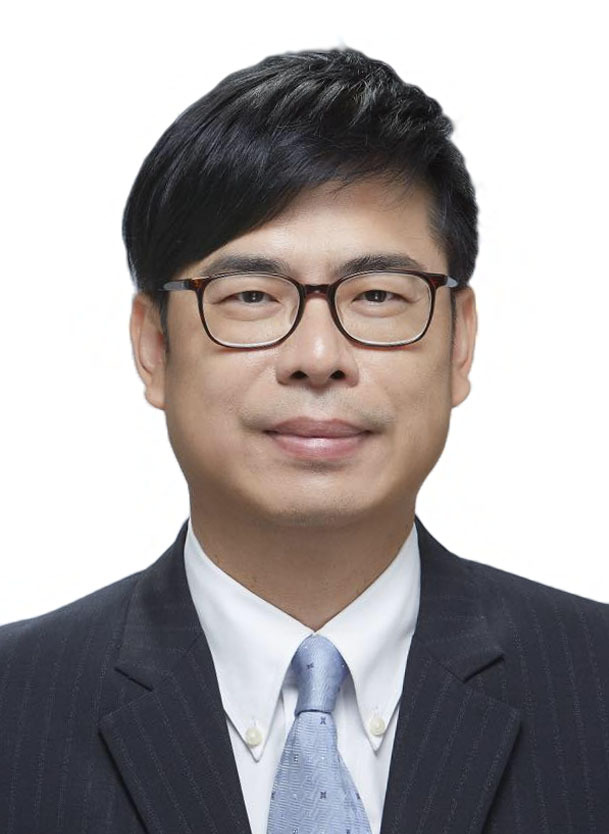
Chen Chi-mai, the incumbent Mayor of Kaohsiung

=== Government ===
Elected in 1998, Frank Hsieh of the Democratic Progressive Party was reelected twice as Mayor of Kaohsiung, where he was widely credited for transforming the city from an industrial sprawl into an attractive modern metropolis. Hsieh resigned from the office of mayor to take up the office of Premier of the Republic of China in 2005. The subsequent municipal election, held on 9 December 2006, resulted in a victory for the Democratic Progressive Party's candidate Chen Chu, the first elected female mayor of special municipality in Taiwan, defeating her Kuomintang rival and former deputy mayor, Huang Jun-ying.

After the 2010 municipal consolidation with Kaohsiung County, Chen Chu continued to govern until 2018. Kuomintang candidate Han Kuo-yu won the 2018 mayoral election. Han was subsequently recalled in 2020, after which DPP candidate Chen Chi-mai won the resulting by-election by a landslide margin with over 70 percent of the votes. Chen then won re-election in 2022. As of 12 June 2020, the mayor of Kaohsiung City is Chen Chi-mai.

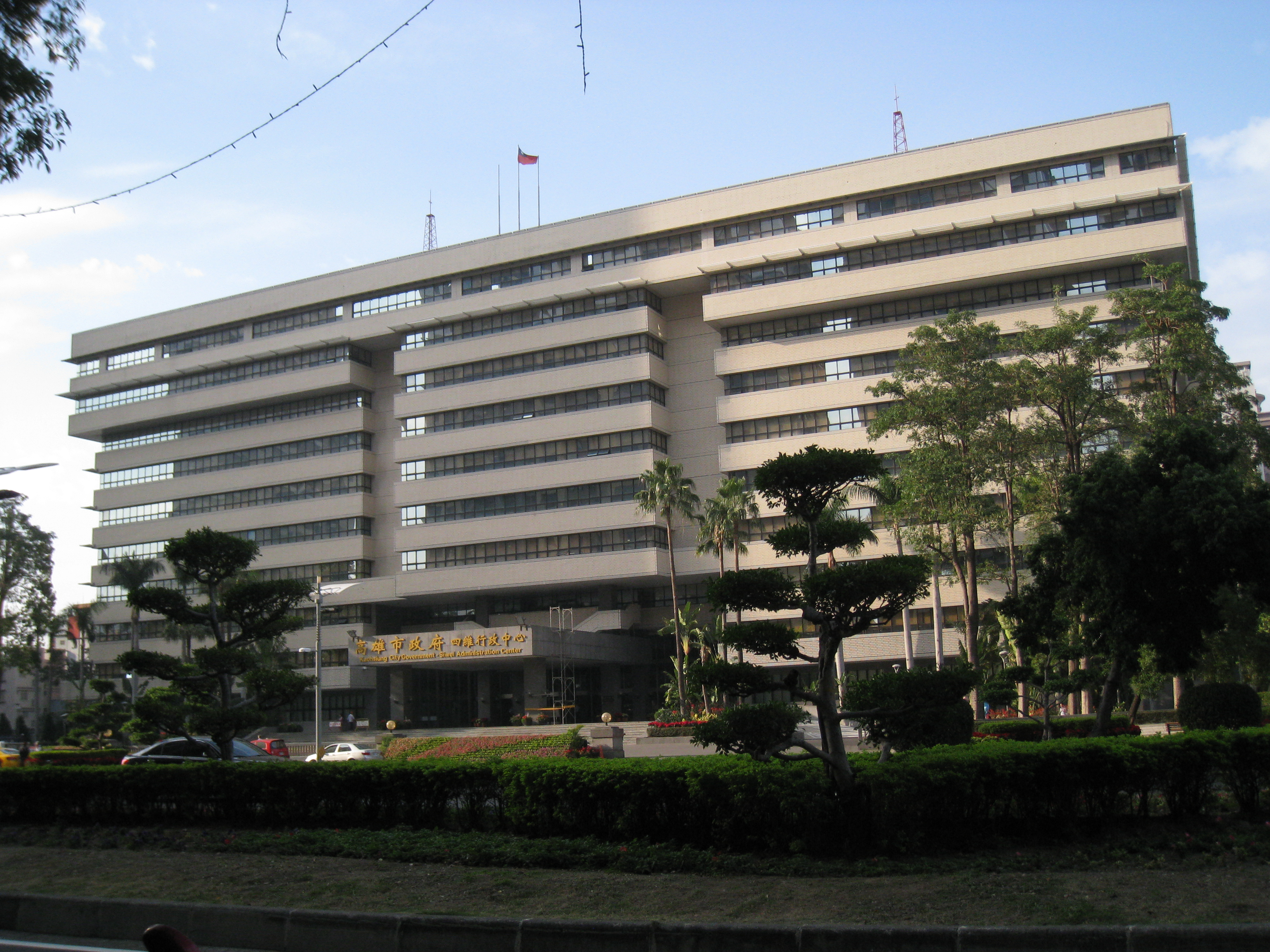
Kaohsiung City Government – Sihwei Administration Center

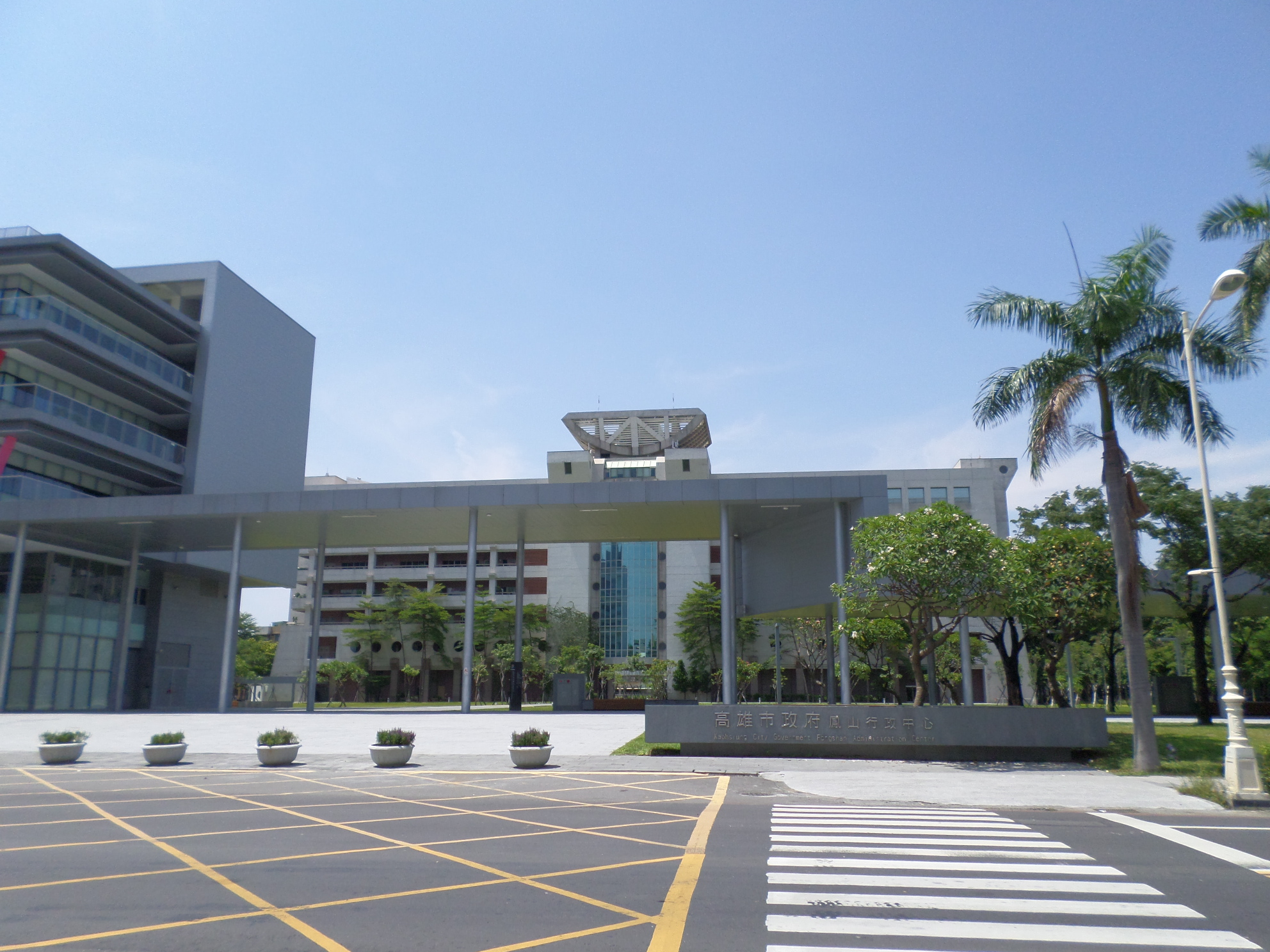
Kaohsiung City Government – Fongshan Administration Center

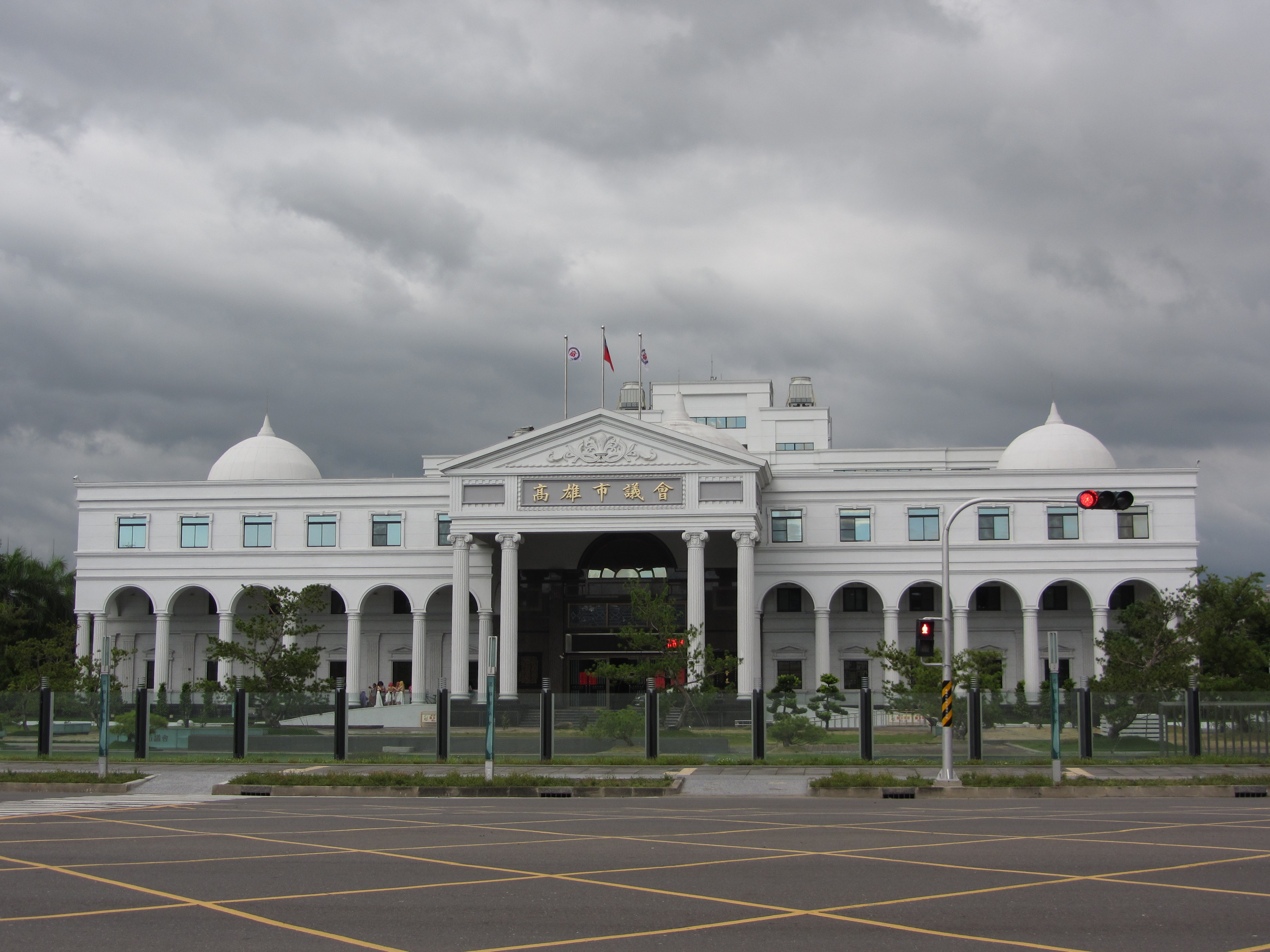
Kaohsiung City Council

Kaohsiung District Court

=== Elections ===
Taiwanese presidential results in Kaohsiung City
Year	DPP		KMT		Others	
Year	No.	%	No.	%	No.	%
2024	800,390	48.89%	478,476	29.23%	358,096	21.88%
2020	1,097,621	62.23%	610,896	34.63%	55,309	3.14%
2016	955,168	63.39%	391,823	26.00%	159,765	10.61%
2012	883,158	53.42%	730,461	44.19%	39,469	2.39%

Sometimes Kaohsiung is seen as the political opposite of Taipei. While northern Taiwan leans towards the Pan-Blue Coalition in the state-level elections, southern Taiwan, including Kaohsiung, leans towards the Pan-Green Coalition since the late 1990s. In recent presidential elections, the DPP's vote share in Kaohsiung has generally exceeded its national vote share.

In the 2020 presidential election, Tsai-Ing Wen won a record amount of votes, surpassing one million votes for the first time by a presidential candidate in the city.

=== Subdivisions ===
Kaohsiung is divided into 38 districts, three of which are mountain indigenous districts. There are a total of 651 villages in which each village is subdivided into neighborhoods (鄰). There are 18,584 neighborhoods in Kaohsiung City. Lingya and Fongshan districts are the administrative centers of the city while Lingya and Sinsing Districts are the two most densely populated districts of the city. Kaohsiung has the most numbers of districts among other special municipalities in Taiwan.

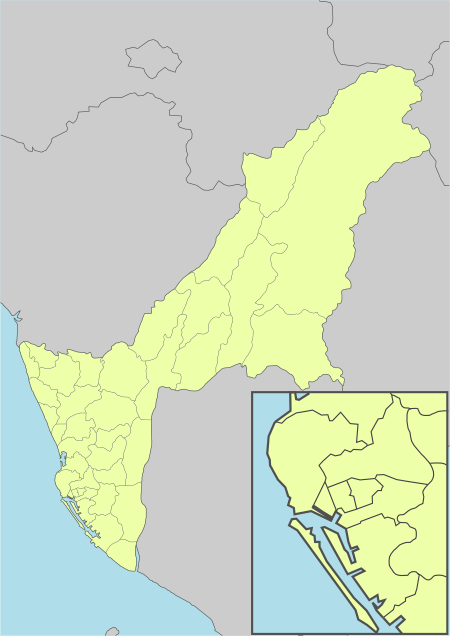
Kaohsiung City administrative divisions map

Kaohsiung City's population density 2009

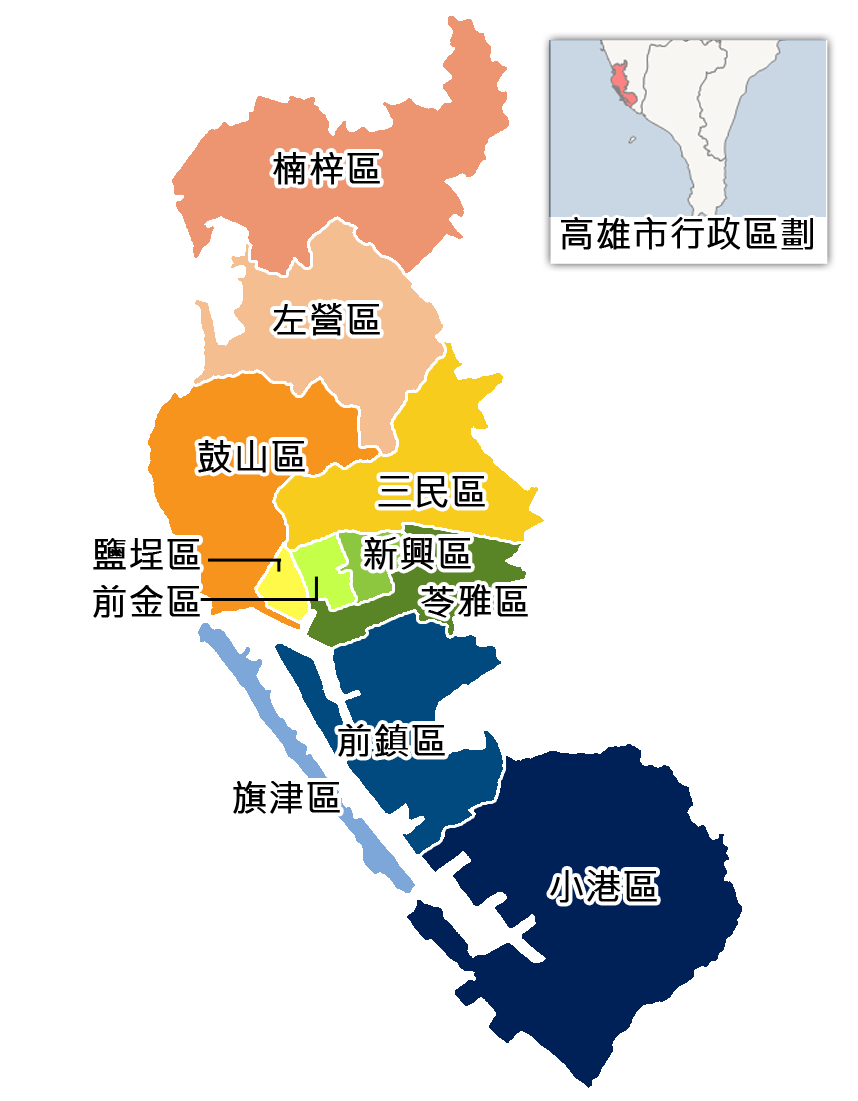
Kaohsiung City with its districts before merger with Kaohsiung County in 2010

Note: There are several romanization systems used in Taiwan. This table contains both Hanyu Pinyin (the official standard of the central government), and Tongyong Pinyin (the official standard of the Kaohsiung City Government). The major order of districts referred to the code of administrative area.

Code	English name	Native name	Population (Note: September 2023)	Area (km^{2})	Population density (/km^{2})	Population 2010 (Note: December 2010)	Population change (Note: September 2023 − December 2010)
64000010	Yancheng District	鹽埕區	22,505	1.42	16,843.66	27,399	−4,894
64000020	Gushan District	鼓山區	140,492	14.75	9,573.42	131,728	+8,764
64000030	Zuoying District	左營區	196,953	19.38	10,210.37	191,991	+4,962
64000040	Nanzih District	楠梓區	192,777	25.83	7,287.69	173,053	+19,724
64000050	Sanmin District	三民區	331,864	19.79	17,156.54	354,022	−22,158
64000060	Sinsing District	新興區	49,495	1.98	25,775.76	55,287	−5,792
64000070	Cianjin District	前金區	27,033	1.86	14,466.67	28,859	−1,826
64000080	Lingya District	苓雅區	163,779	8.15	20,714.85	183,948	−20,169
64000090	Cianjhen District	前鎮區	180,233	19.12	9,809.62	199,144	−18,911
64000100	Cijin District	旗津區	26,301	1.46	19,225.34	29,968	−3,667
64000110	Siaogang District	小港區	155,042	45.44	3,474.93	154,548	+494
64000120	Fongshan District	鳳山區	356,397	26.76	13,456.95	341,120	+15,277
64000130	Linyuan District	林園區	68,328	32.29	2,155.40	70,512	−2,184
64000140	Daliao District	大寮區	111,910	71.04	1,580.60	108,984	+2,946
64000150	Dashu District	大樹區	40,505	66.98	628.28	43,955	−3,450
64000160	Dashe District	大社區	33,689	26.58	1,294.96	32,941	+748
64000170	Renwu District	仁武區	97,008	36.08	2,489.05	72,202	+24,806
64000180	Niaosong District	鳥松區	44,468	24.59	1,826.96	42,595	+1,873
64000190	Gangshan District	岡山區	95,533	47.94	2,026.49	97,102	−1,569
64000200	Ciaotou District	橋頭區	41,488	25.94	1,477.33	36,415	+5,073
64000210	Yanchao District	燕巢區	28,777	65.40	453.72	30,790	−2,013
64000220	Tianliao District	田寮區	6,549	92.68	75.92	8,214	−1,665
64000230	Alian District	阿蓮區	27,465	34.62	823.45	30,383	−2,918
64000240	Lujhu District	路竹區	50,396	48.43	1,077.60	53,791	−3,395
64000250	Hunei District	湖內區	29,629	20.16	1,474.26	28,827	+802
64000260	Qieding District	茄萣區	29,292	15.76	1,905.52	31,433	−2,141
64000270	Yong'an District	永安區	13,855	22.61	608.85	14,301	−446
64000280	Mituo District	彌陀區	18,331	14.78	1,287.21	20,433	−2,102
64000290	Ziguan District	梓官區	34,813	11.60	3,081.12	36,726	−1,913
64000300	Cishan District	旗山區	34,390	94.61	383.54	39,873	−5,483
64000310	Meinong District	美濃區	37,116	120.03	325.69	42,993	−5,877
64000320	Liouguei District	六龜區	11,731	194.16	64.99	14,833	−3,102
64000330	Jiasian District	甲仙區	5,584	124.03	47.77	7,228	−1,644
64000340	Shanlin District	杉林區	10,970	104.00	112.13	11,842	−872
64000350	Neimen District	內門區	13,258	95.62	148.34	15,951	−2,693
64000360	Maolin District	茂林區	1,893	194.00	10.01	1,874	+19
64000370	Taoyuan District	桃源區	4,249	928.98	4.58	4,817	−568
64000380	Namasia District	那瑪夏區	3,163	252.99	12.44	3,401	−238

== Notable people ==
- Yoshikazu Sunako (1932–2020), Japanese motorcycle racer and racing driver
- Tony Hwang (1964–), Taiwanese-American politician
- Kuo-chu Wu (1970–2006), Taiwanese choreographer
- George Chou (1975–), Taiwanese racing driver
- Lu Chen (1976), Taiwanese magician
- Tony Sun (Chinese Name: 孫協志) Born: 20 February 1978 in Fengshan District - (leader of Taiwanese group, 5566)
- Janet Hsieh (1980–), Taiwanese-American actor and host
- Chuang Chih-yuan (1981–), Taiwanese table tennis player
- Wei-Yin Chen (1985–), Taiwanese baseball player
- Joe Alexander (1986–), Taiwanese-born American-Israeli basketball player
- Yi-wei Chen (1987–), Taiwanese soccer player
- Eddy Chen (1992–), Taiwanese-Australian violinist and Member of TwoSet Violin
- Tzu-Wei Lin (1994–), Taiwanese baseball player
- Tzu-ying Tai (1994–), Taiwanese badminton player
- Chen Chieh-hsien (1994–), Taiwanese baseball player
- James Wen (1978–), Taiwanese actor, model and tv host

== Transportation ==
=== Port of Kaohsiung ===
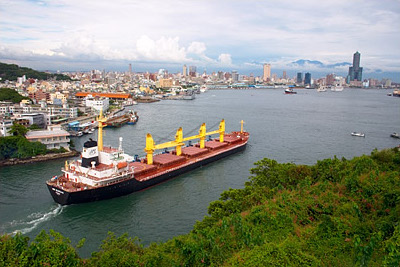
Northern portion of Kaohsiung harbor viewed from Cijin island lighthouse hill

A major port, through which pass most of Taiwan's marine imports and exports, is located in the city but is not managed by the city government. Instead, it is administered by Kaohsiung Port Authority, under the Ministry of Transportation. There is a push for Kaohsiung City to annex the Port of Kaohsiung to facilitate better regional planning.

Also known as the "Harbour Capital" of Taiwan, Kaohsiung has always had a strong link with the ocean and maritime transportation. Ferries play a key role in everyday transportation, especially for transportation across the harbor. With five terminals and 23 berths, the Port of Kaohsiung is Taiwan's largest container port and the 13th largest in the world. In 2007 the port reached its handling capacity with a record trade volume of 10.2 million twenty-foot equivalent units (TEU). A new container terminal is under construction, increasing future handling capacity by 2 million TEU by 2013.

Kaohsiung is one of the biggest ports in the world for importing shark fins, sold at high prices in the restaurants and shops of Taiwan and China. They are brought in from overseas and are placed out to dry in the sun on residential rooftops near the port.

=== Kaohsiung International Airport ===
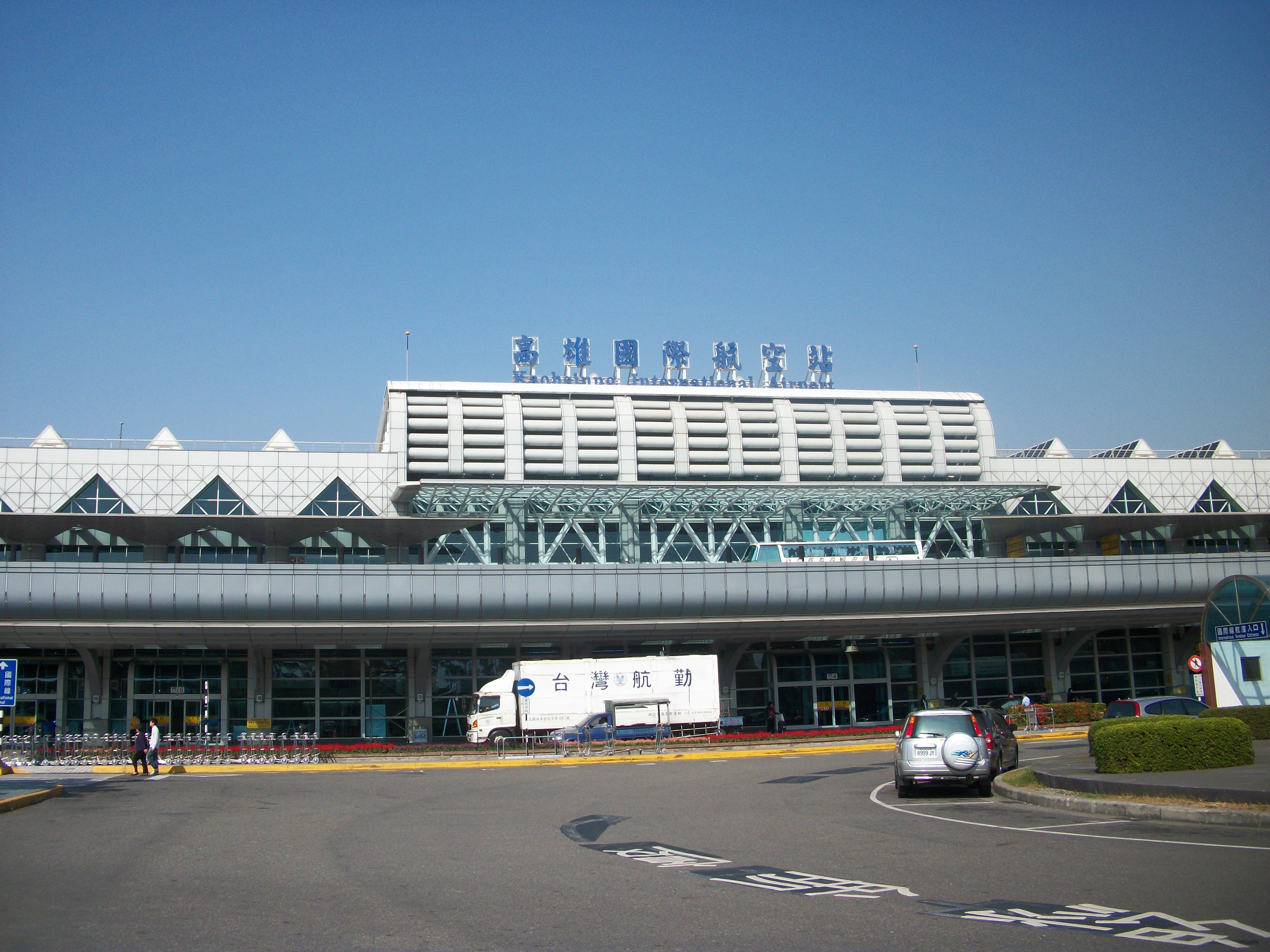
Kaohsiung International Airport

Kaohsiung City is also home to Taiwan's second-largest international airport, the Kaohsiung International Airport, located in Siaogang District near the city's center. It is one of the three major international airports of Taiwan, serving passengers of the entire southern and southeastern part of the country. However, the size of the airport is relatively small, with short runways compared to other major airports of Taiwan due to its age and its location near the city center, making it impossible for large aircraft such as the Airbus A380 to land at the airport. As a result, plans for work to begin on a new terminal is expected to start in 2023, and could handle up to 16.5 million passengers once complete.

=== Rapid transit ===
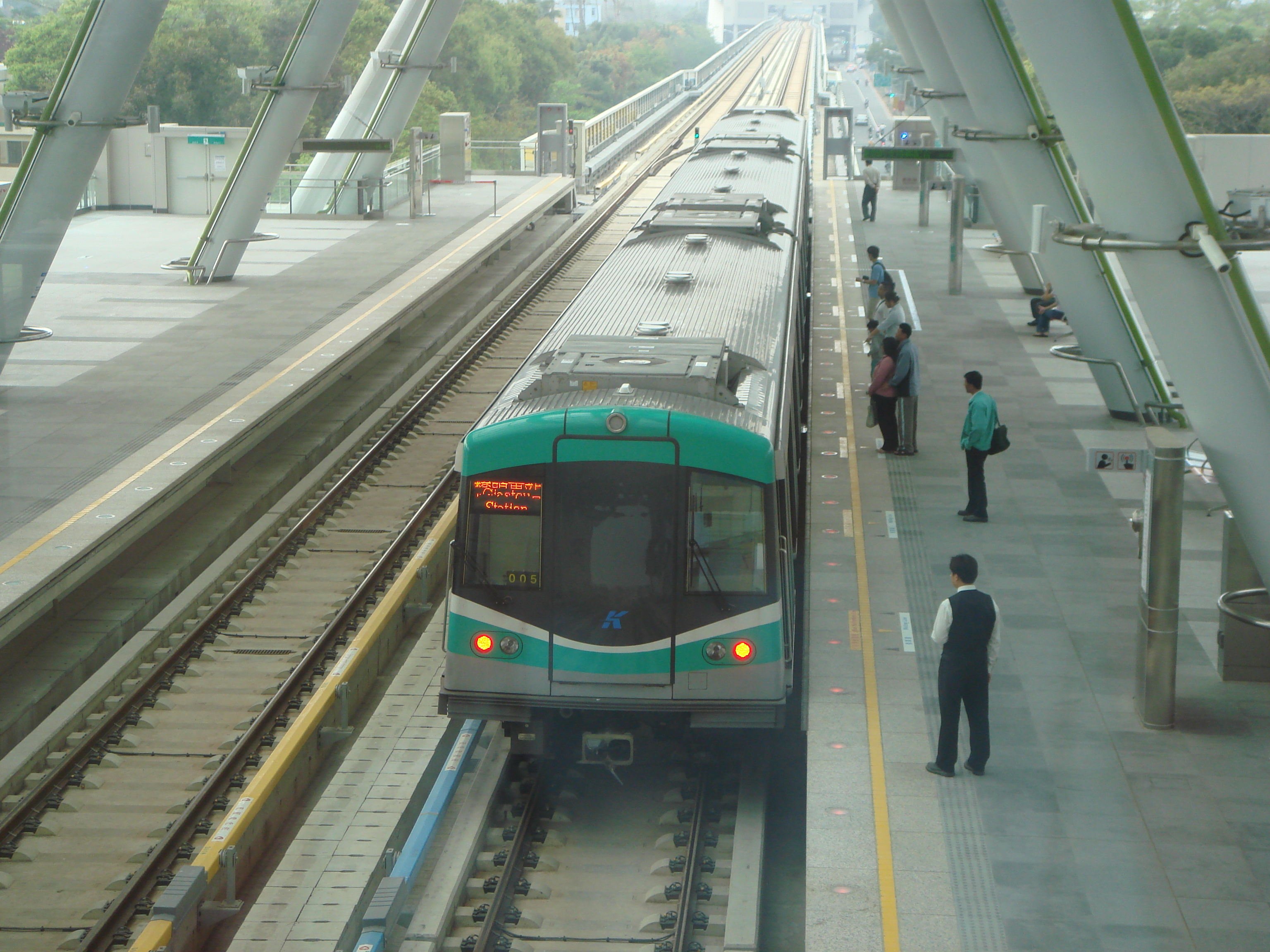
The Kaohsiung MRT

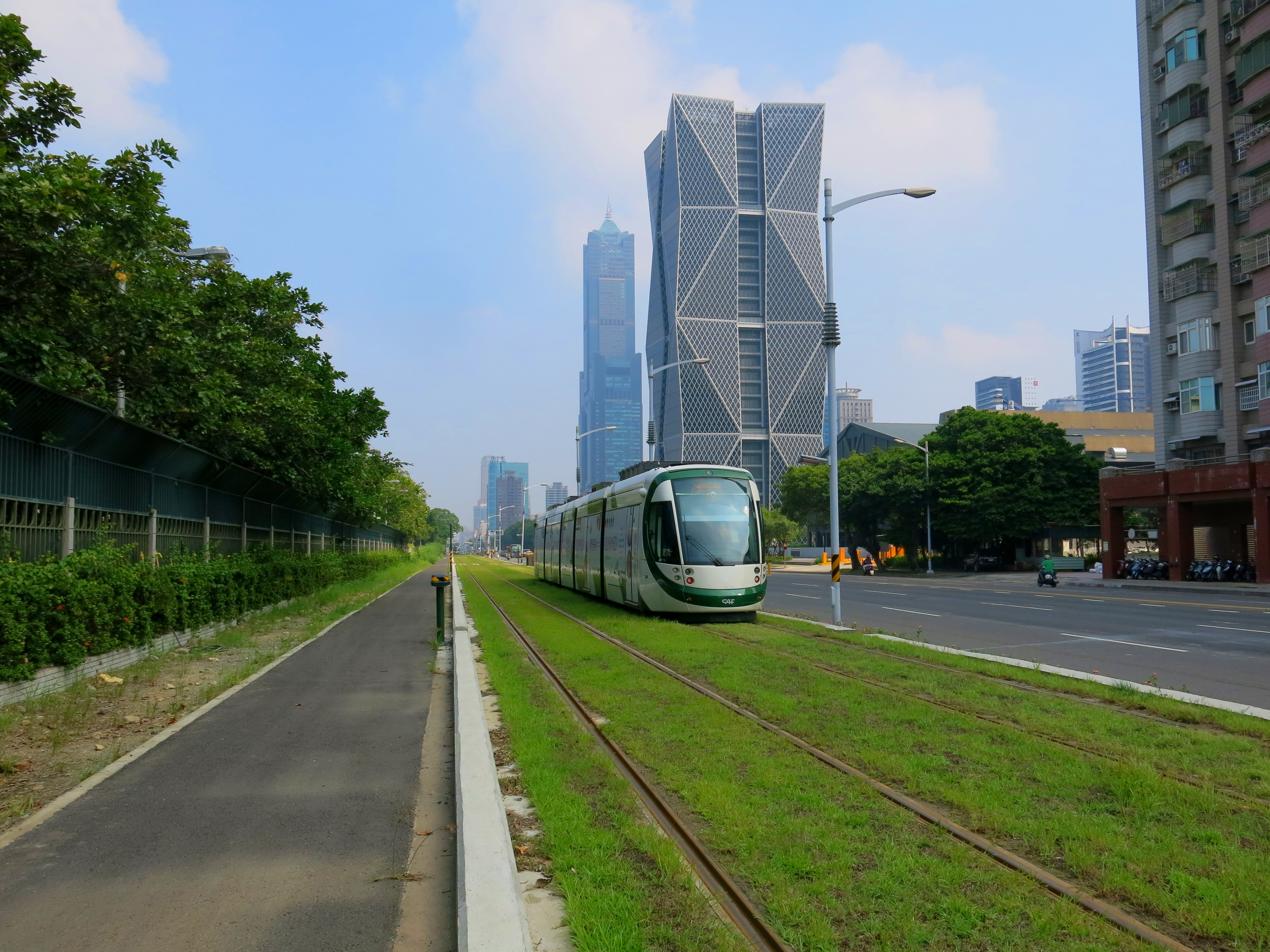
The Kaohsiung Circular Light Rail

Kaohsiung Mass Rapid Transit opened for service in March 2008. The MRT is made up of two lines with 37 stations covering a distance of 42.7 km (26.5 mi).

Two of Kaohsiung's MRT stations, Formosa Boulevard Station and Central Park Station, were ranked among the top 50 most beautiful subway systems in the world by Metrobits.org in 2011. In 2012, the two stations respectively are ranked as the 2nd and the 4th among the top 15 most beautiful subway stops in the world by BootsnAll.

=== Circular Light Rail ===
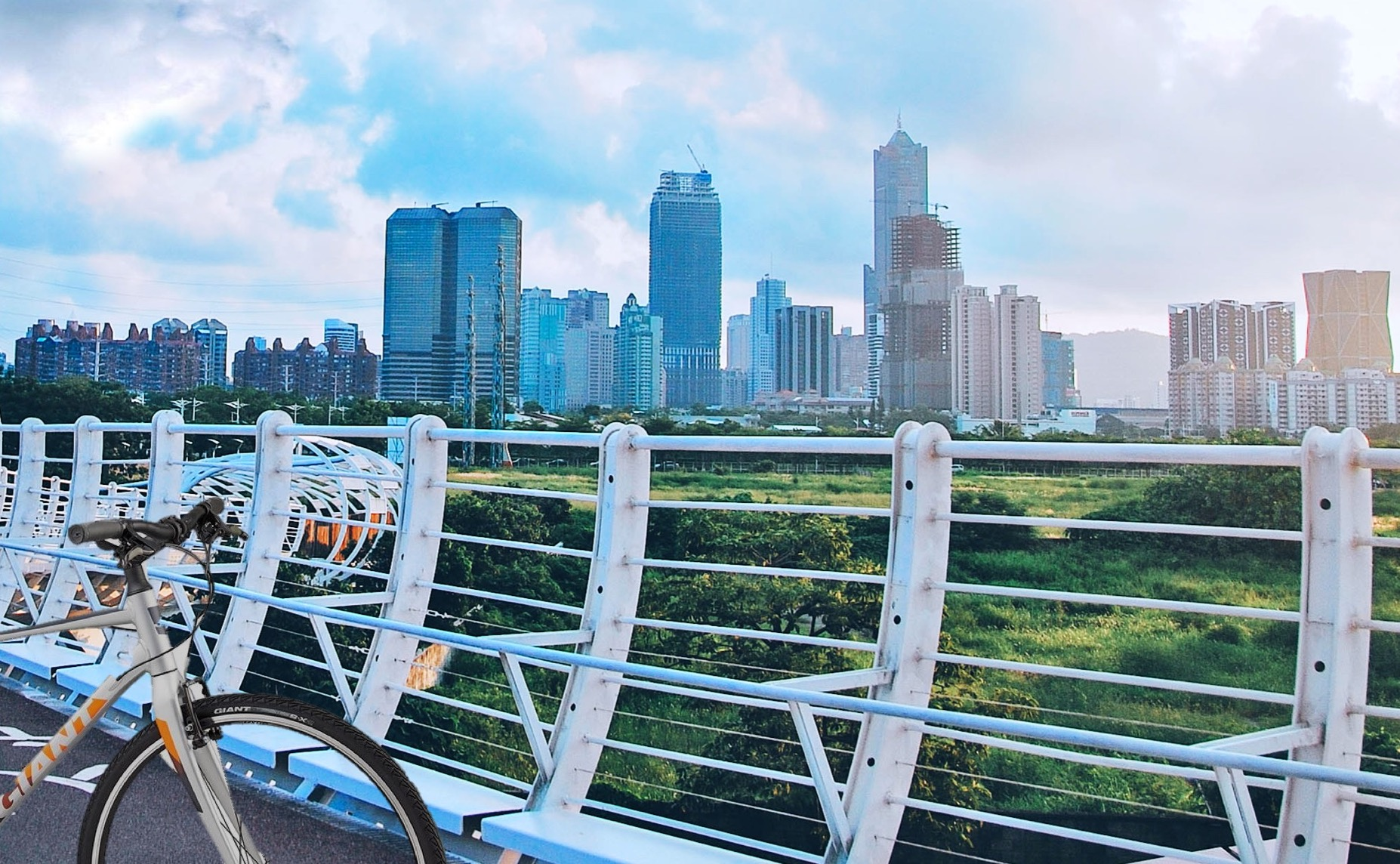
Skyline of Kaohsiung viewed from Cianjhen Star light rail station

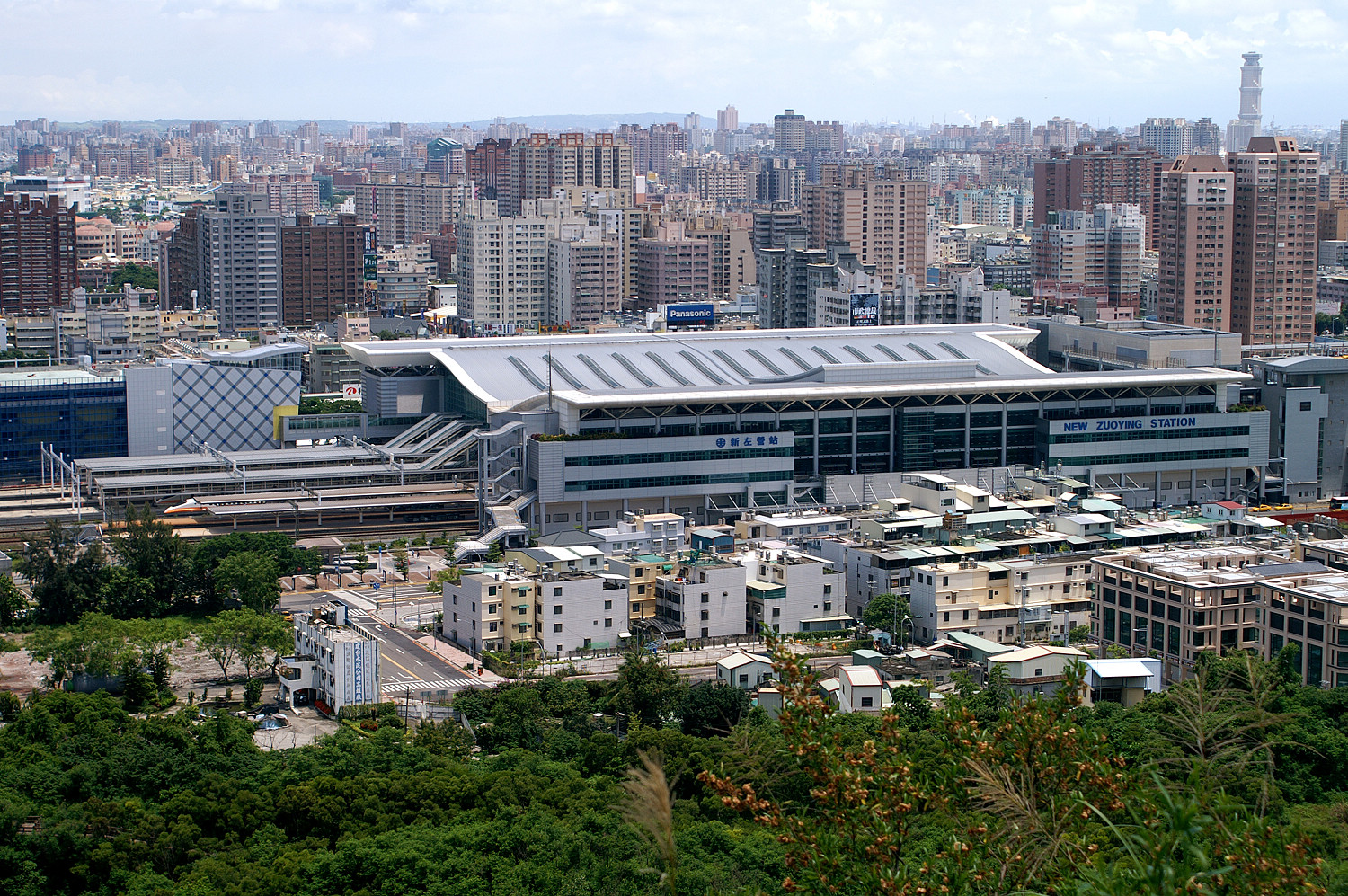
Zuoying Station of THSR

The Circular Light Rail Line (also known as the Kaohsiung LRT, Kaohsiung Tram) for Kaohsiung City is a light rail line. Construction of Phase 1, known as the Waterside Light Rail began in June 2013 and is in full operation since September 2017. To combat air pollution, usage of the light rail, as well as buses, was made free of charge for electronic ticket holders from December to February, when air pollution is at its peak.

=== Railway ===
The city is served by the Taiwan Railway's Western Line and Pingtung Line. Kaohsiung Main Station is an underground station, replacing the old ground level station.

=== High Speed Railway ===
Since 2007, Taiwan High Speed Rail has served Kaohsiung via Zuoying HSR station. On January 4, 2023, the Pingtung HSR extension was approved by Premier Su Tseng-chang, and the High Speed Rail extension was confirmed to bypass central Kaohsiung City and Kaohsiung Main Station.

== Sports ==
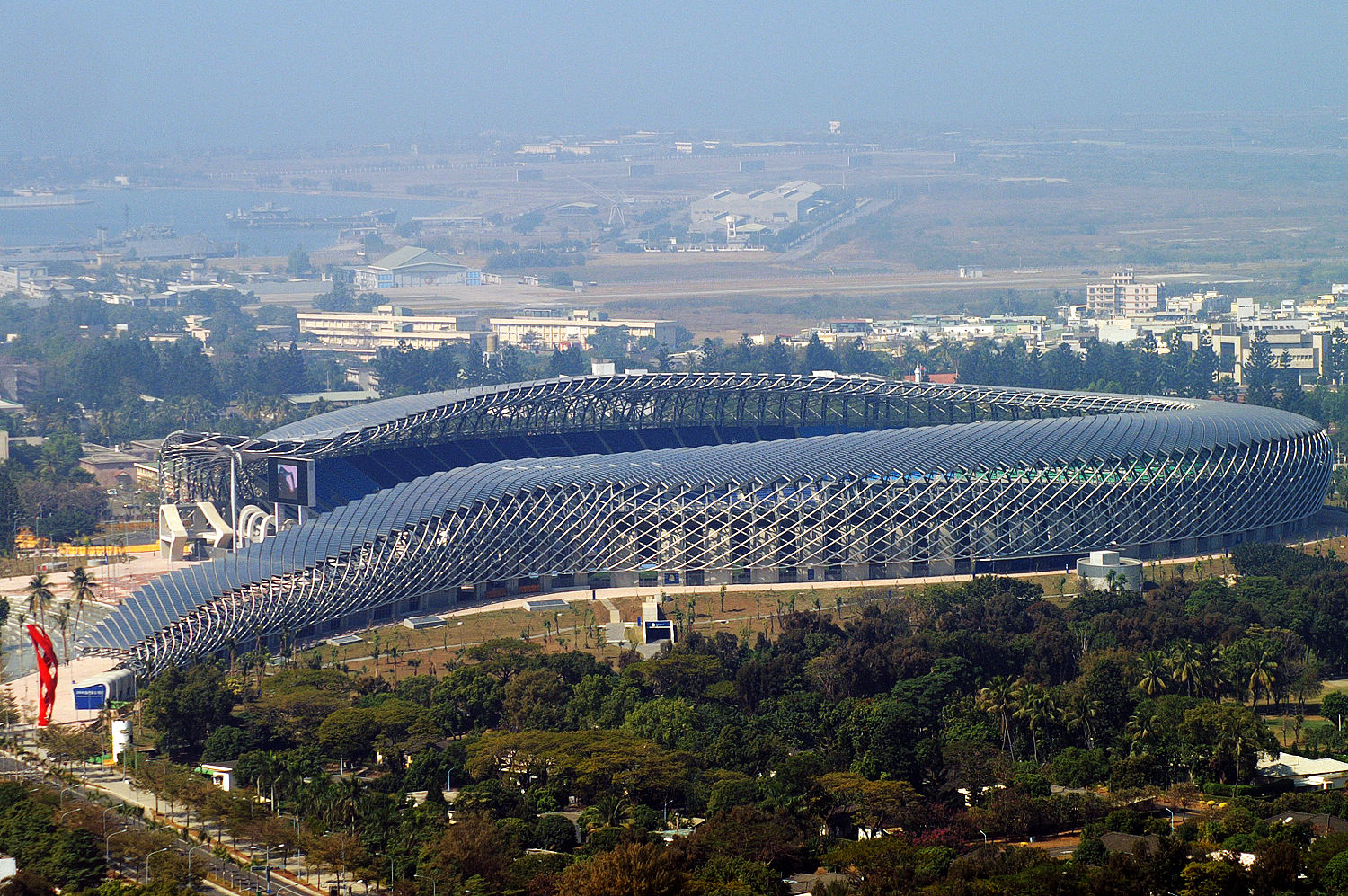
National Stadium

Kaohsiung is home to Taiwan's largest international-class stadium, the National Stadium, with a maximum capacity of 55,000 seats, as well as Kaohsiung Arena. The city hosted the 2009 World Games at the National Stadium. Nearly 6,000 athletes, officials, coaches, referees and others from 103 countries participated in the 2009 Kaohsiung World Games.

TSG Hawks of Taiwan's Chinese Professional Baseball League, are based in Chengcing Lake Baseball Stadium.

Kaohsiung also has two professional basketball teams, the Kaohsiung Aquas of the Taiwan Professional Basketball League and the Kaohsiung Steelers of the P. League+. Kaohsiung was also home to the Kaohsiung Truth of the ASEAN Basketball League. They were the first team in the history of the league that was based outside Southeast Asia. The team folded in 2017.

The TSG SkyHawks of the Taiwan Professional Volleyball League are based in Fengshan Arena.

Other recent major sporting events held by Kaohsiung include:

- 2001 Asian Cycling Championships
- 2005 WPA World Nine-ball Championship
- 2011 AFC President's Cup
- 2013 World Modern Pentathlon Championships
- 2016 Asian Men's U20 Volleyball Championship
- WTA Taiwan Open (2016)
- 2019 U-19 Asia Rugby Championship
- Kaohsiung Fubon Marathon (held annually)

== Education ==
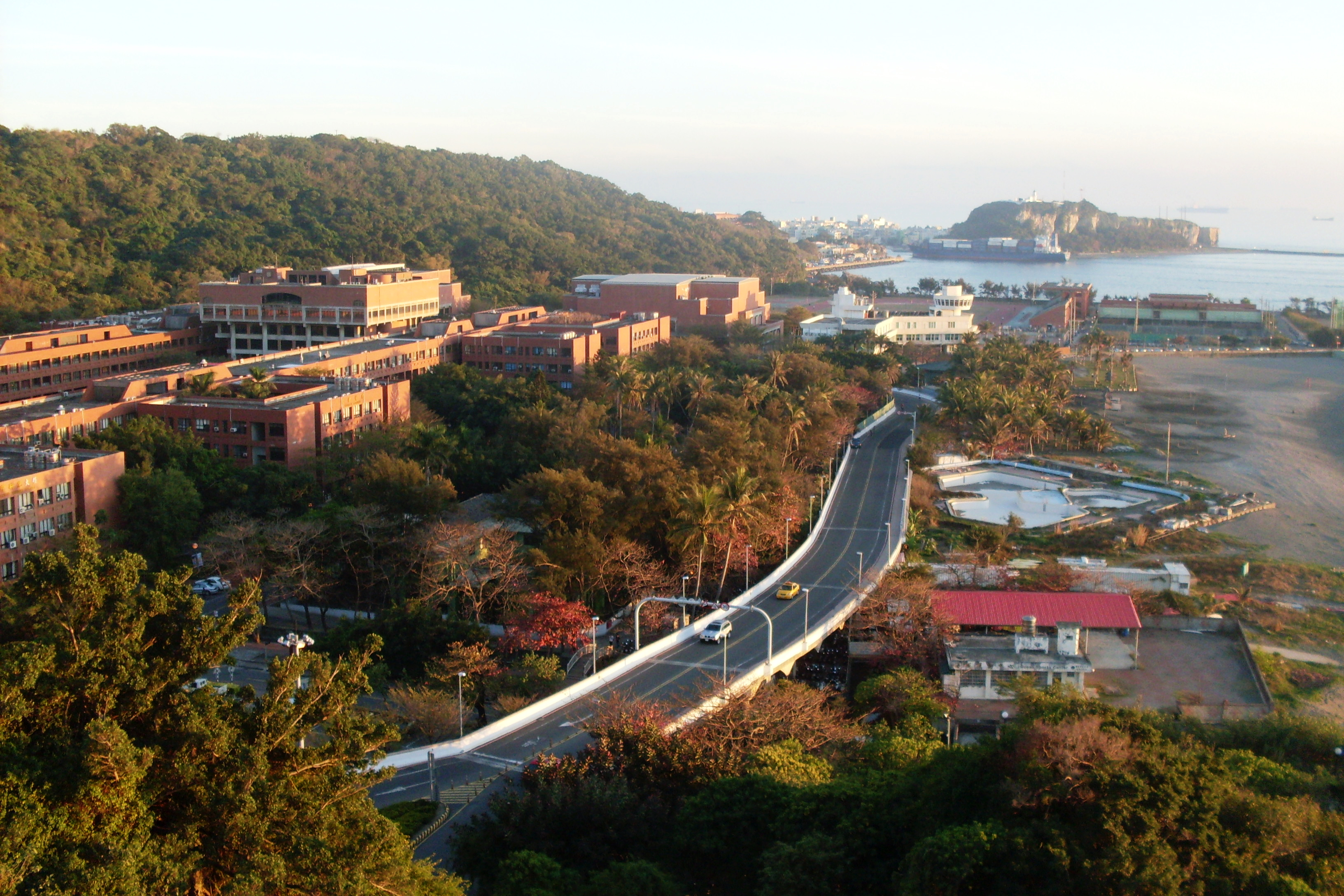
The campus of National Sun Yat-sen University

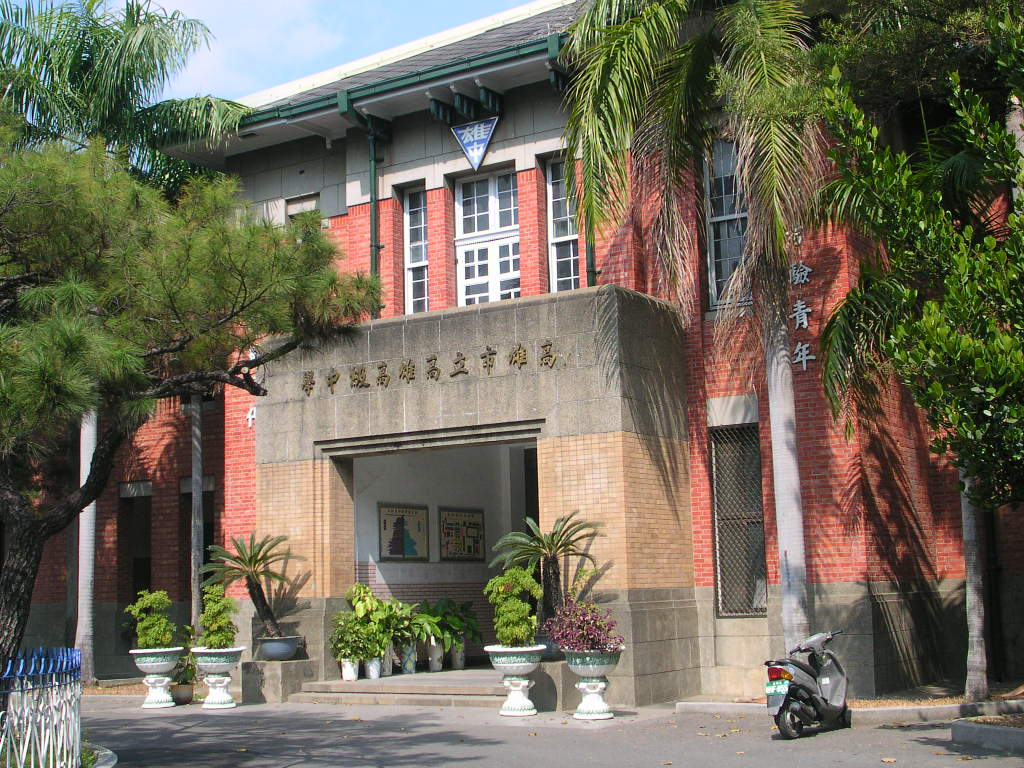
Kaohsiung Municipal Kaohsiung Senior High School

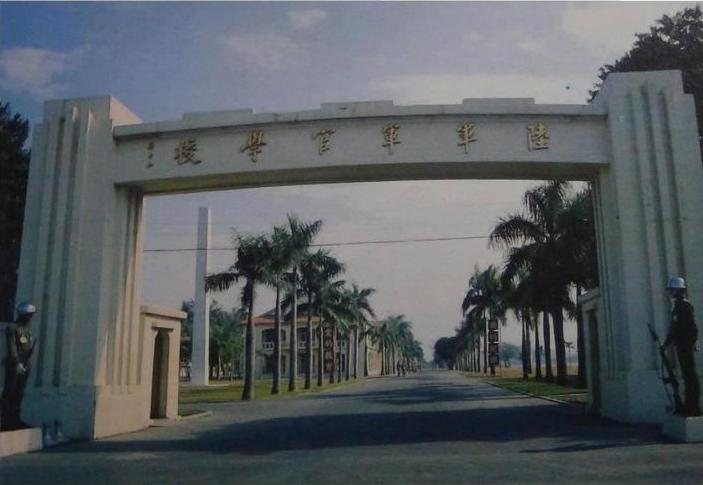
Front gate of the Republic of China Military Academy

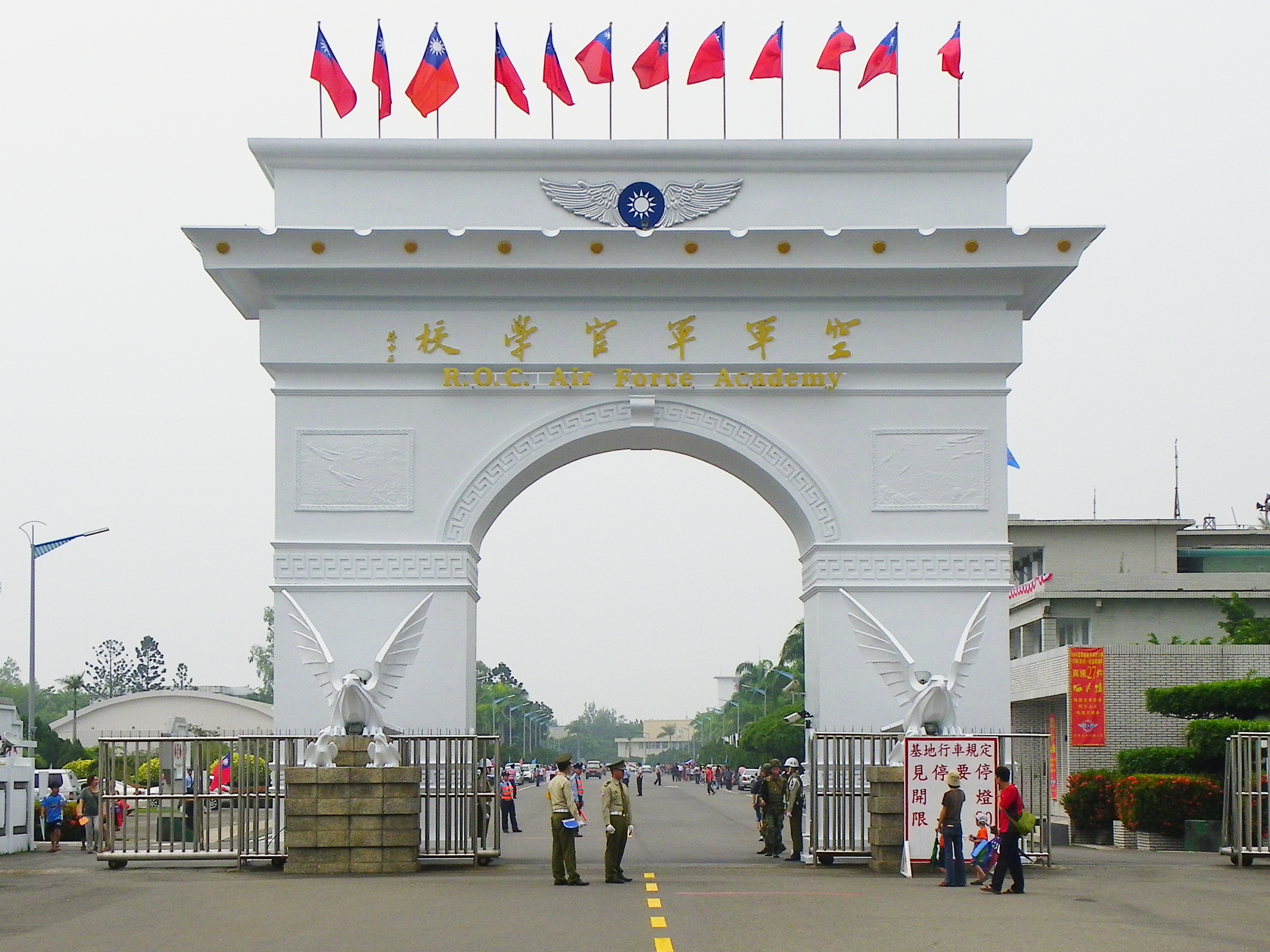
Front gate of the Republic of China Air Force Academy

Kaohsiung has a number of colleges and junior colleges offering training in commerce, education, maritime technology, medicine, modern languages, nursing, and technology, as well as various international schools and eight national military schools, including the three major military academies of the country, the Republic of China Military Academy, Republic of China Naval Academy and Republic of China Air Force Academy.

Universities

- I-Shou University
- Kaohsiung Medical University
- National Kaohsiung Normal University
- National Sun Yat-sen University
- National University of Kaohsiung
- Shih Chien University Kaohsiung campus
- National Yang Ming Chiao Tung University Kaohsiung campus
- National Tsing Hua University Kaohsiung campus

Technical and vocational universities

- Cheng Shiu University
- Fooyin University
- National Kaohsiung University of Hospitality and Tourism
- National Kaohsiung University of Science and Technology
- Wenzao Ursuline University of Languages

High schools and junior high schools

- The Affiliated Hospitality Senior High School of National Kaohsiung University of Hospitality and Tourism
- The Affiliated Senior High School of National Kaohsiung Normal University
- Cheng Yi Senior High School
- Chung Cheng Armed Forces Preparatory School
- Chung Shan Industrial & Commercial School
- Chung-Hwa School of Arts
- FUHWA Senior High School
- Guoguang Laboratory School, National Sun Yat-sen University
- Kao-Feng Vocational High School
- Kaohsiung Dah Yung Senior High School
- Kaohsiung Municipal Chung-Cheng Industrial High School
- Kaohsiung Municipal Chungshan Senior High School
- Kaohsiung Municipal Cianjhen Senior High School
- Kaohsiung Municipal Fu Cheng High School
- Kaohsiung Municipal Gushan Senior High School
- Kaohsiung Municipal Haiching Vocational High School of Technology and Commerce
- Kaohsiung Municipal Jhongjheng Senior High School
- Kaohsiung Municipal Kaohsiung Girls' Senior High School
- Kaohsiung Municipal Kaohsiung Industrial High School
- Kaohsiung Municipal Kaohsiung Senior High School
- Kaohsiung Municipal Kaohsiung Vocational High School of Commerce
- Kaohsiung Municipal Lujhu Senior High School
- Kaohsiung Municipal Nanzih Comprehensive Senior High School
- Kaohsiung Municipal Renwu Senior High School
- Kaohsiung Municipal Rueisiang High School
- Kaohsiung Municipal Sanmin Home Economics & Commerce Vocational High School
- Kaohsiung Municipal Sanmin Senior High School
- Kaohsiung Municipal Siaogang Senior High School
- Kaohsiung Municipal Sinsing Senior High School
- Kaohsiung Municipal Tsoying Senior High School
- Kaohsiung Municipal Hsin Chuang Senior High School
- Lichih Senior High School
- National Feng-Hsin Senior High School
- National Feng-Shan Senior High School
- National FongShan Senior Commercial & Industrial Vocational School
- National Kangshan Agricultural & Industrial Vocational Senior High School
- National Kangshan Senior High School
- Saint Dominic's Catholic High School
- Sansin High School of Commerce And Home Economics Kaohsiung
- Shu-Te Home economics & Commercial High School
- Sin-Guang Senior High School
- Taiwan Kaohsiung St. Paul's High School

International schools

- Dominican International School Kaohsiung
- I-Shou International School
- Kaohsiung American School
- Kivam Junior High School
- Morrison Academy Kaohsiung

Military schools

- Chung Cheng Armed Forces Preparatory School
- Republic of China Air Force Academy
- Republic of China Air Force Institute of Technology
- Republic of China Army Infantry School
- Republic of China Marine Corps School
- Republic of China Military Academy
- Republic of China Naval Academy

(Note: The lists above are not comprehensive.)

== Conferences and events ==
The Kaohsiung Exhibition Center, built by the Kaohsiung City Government, was opened on 14 April 2014. It includes an exhibition space for 1,500 booths, and a convention hall for 2,000 people.

The center hosted the Taiwan International Boat Show in May 2014. Another conference and event-related venue is the newly renovated International Convention Center Kaohsiung in 2013.

== Sister cities and friendship cities ==
There are three Consulates in Kaohsiung.United States Institute in Taiwan Kaohsiung Branch Office, Japan -Taiwan Exchange Association Kaohsiung Office, Philippines Representative Office Kaohsiung Branch in Taiwan.

Kaohsiung is twinned with the following locations:

Asia

- Hachiōji City, Tokyo Metropolis, Japan
- Kumamoto City, Kumamoto Prefecture, Japan
- Kumamoto Prefecture, Japan
- Sado City, Niigata Prefecture, Japan
- Aomori Prefecture, Japan
- Mutsu City, Aomori Prefecture, Japan
- Kitakyushu City, Fukuoka Prefecture, Japan
- Busan, South Korea
- Daegu, South Korea
- Daejeon, South Korea
- Gwangju, South Korea
- Suwon, Gyeonggi Province, South Korea
- Da Nang, Vietnam
- Cebu, Central Visayas, Philippines
- Malé, Maldives
- Koror, Palau

America

- Orange County, New York, United States
- Colorado Springs, Colorado, United States
- Fort Lauderdale, Florida, United States
- Pensacola, Florida, United States
- Miami, Florida, United States
- Tulsa, Oklahoma, United States
- Honolulu, Hawaii, United States
- Knoxville, Tennessee, United States
- Little Rock, Arkansas, United States
- Oakland, California, United States
- Macon, Georgia, United States
- Plains, Georgia, United States
- Mobile, Alabama, United States
- Portland, Oregon, United States
- San Antonio, Texas, United States
- King County, Washington, United States
- Seattle, Washington, United States
- Guam, United States
- Pima County, Arizona, United States
- Tucson, Arizona, United States
- Belize City, Belize
- Cartago, Costa Rica
- Panama City, Panama
- Basseterre City, Saint Kitts and Nevis
- Barranquilla, Colombia

Europe

- Erzgebirgskreis, Saxony, Germany
- Pristina, Kosovo
- Bratislava Region, Slovakia
- Gdynia, Pomeranian Voivodeship, Poland
- Katowice, Silesian Voivodeship, Poland

Africa and oceania

- Blantyre, Malawi
- Durban, South Africa
- Mbabane, Eswatini
- San-Pédro, Côte d'Ivoire
- Brisbane, Queensland, Australia

Additionally, Kaohsiung's administrative districts have also signed friendship agreements with these international cities:

- Gushan District — Kaga City, Ishikawa Prefecture, Japan
- Gushan District — Himi City, Toyama Prefecture, Japan
- Dashu District — Taiki Town, Hokkaido Prefecture, Japan
- Meinong District — Mino City, Gifu Prefecture, Japan
- Yancheng District — Dong District, Busan, South Korea
- Yancheng District — Dipolog, Zamboanga Peninsula, Philippines
- Cijin District — Minamisatsuma City, Kagoshima Prefecture, Japan
- Fongshan District — Çanakkale, Çanakkale Province, Turkey

== See also ==
- Administrative divisions of Taiwan
- List of cities in Taiwan
