= Weiwuying =

Weiwuying (Chinese: 衛武營; pinyin: Wèiwǔyíng) can refer to the following:

- National Kaohsiung Center for the Arts, also known as Weiwuying
- Weiwuying metro station
