= TMI =

TMI may refer to:

== Organizations ==
- Taiwan Music Institute, a musical institute in Taiwan
- Teen Missions International, an interdenominational mission organization based in Florida
- The Monroe Institute, a nonprofit education and research organization
- Three Mile Island Nuclear Generating Station, a nuclear power station in Pennsylvania, USA
- Thomas More Institute, a secular academic institution located in Montreal, Quebec, Canada
- Time Module (TMI), a member of the Seiko Group, manufacturer of watch movements
- TMI Associates, a Japanese law firm
- TMI Episcopal, formerly Texas Military Institute, a preparatory school affiliated with the Episcopal Church
- Toastmasters International, an international public speaking organization
- Tolani Maritime Institute, a Merchant Navy training institute

== Science ==
- Trans-Mars injection, a propulsive maneuver used to set a spacecraft on a trajectory which will cause it to arrive to Mars
- Transmarginal inhibition, a mental response to extreme stresses or pain
- Trimethylindium, the most preferred metalorganic indium source for the MOCVD of Compound Semiconductors
- Tri-ponderal Mass Index, also known as corpulence index, an alternative to body mass index as an estimate of obesity

== Other uses ==
- TMI, abbreviation for "Too much information", indicating information overload or excessively personal information
- "T.M.I." (South Park), a 2011 episode
- TMI Mudlib (TMI or TMI-2), online game software named for The Mud Institute
- The Mortal Instruments, a series of books by Cassandra Clare
- Sam & Mark's TMi Friday, previously called TMi, a Saturday morning show on CBBC
- Ton-mile or tmi, a unit of freight transportation quantity
- Tumlingtar Airport, an airport serving Tumlingtar, a city in Nepal
- "TMI" a song by Joan Jett and the Blackhearts from the 2013 album Unvarnished
- TMII LRT station, a light rail station in Jakarta, Indonesia
