= National Performing Arts Center =

- 國家表演藝術中心

Agency overview
- Formed: April 7, 2014; 12 years ago
- Jurisdiction: Government of Taiwan
- Headquarters: Taipei, Taiwan
- Website: npac-ntch.org

National Performing Arts Center (NPAC) (Chinese: 國家表演藝術中心) is a complex of three performing arts centers operated by the Taiwan Ministry of Culture and established on April 7, 2014. The three member centers are located in Taipei, Taichung, and Kaohsiung.

- National Theater and Concert Hall, located in Liberty Square, Taipei, comprises two adjacent buildings with a combined total of four venues.
  - National Theater
    - Proscenium Arch Theater (1498 seats).
    - Experimental Theater (up to 180 seats).
  - National Concert Hall
    - Concert Hall (2022 seats). This is the resident venue for the National Symphony Orchestra, also known as Taiwan Philharmonic.
    - Recital Hall (354 seats).
- National Kaohsiung Center for the Arts is located in Weiwuying Metropolitan Park, Kaohsiung and contains four venues. It is the world's largest performing arts center under a single roof.
  - Opera House (2236 seats).
  - Concert Hall (1981 seats).
  - Playhouse (up to 1209 seats).
  - Recital Hall (434 seats).
- National Taichung Theater is located in Taichung, and contains three venues.
  - Grand Theater (2007 seats).
  - Playhouse (up to 794 seats).
  - Black Box (up to 200 seats).
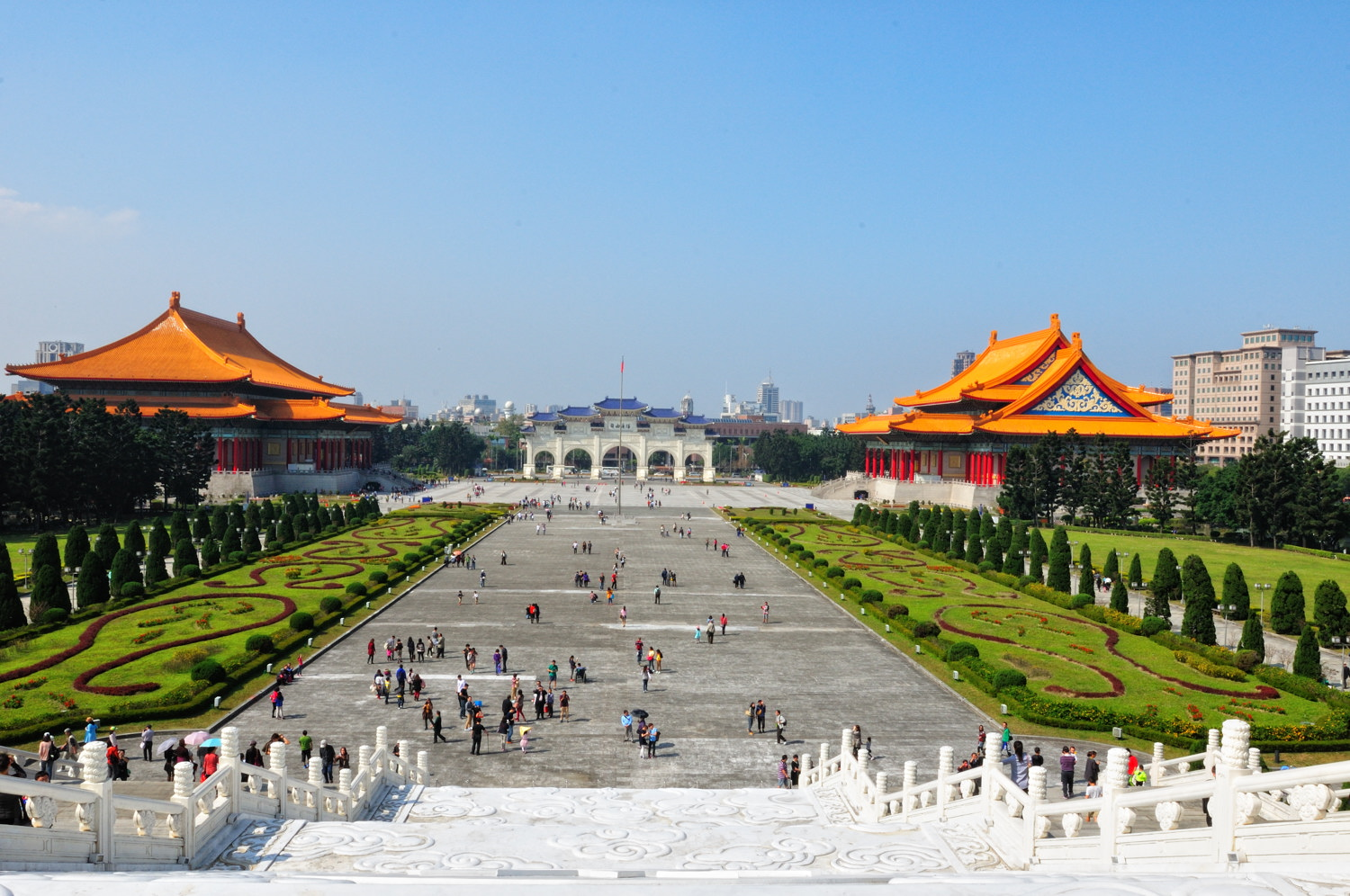
National Theater and Concert Hall

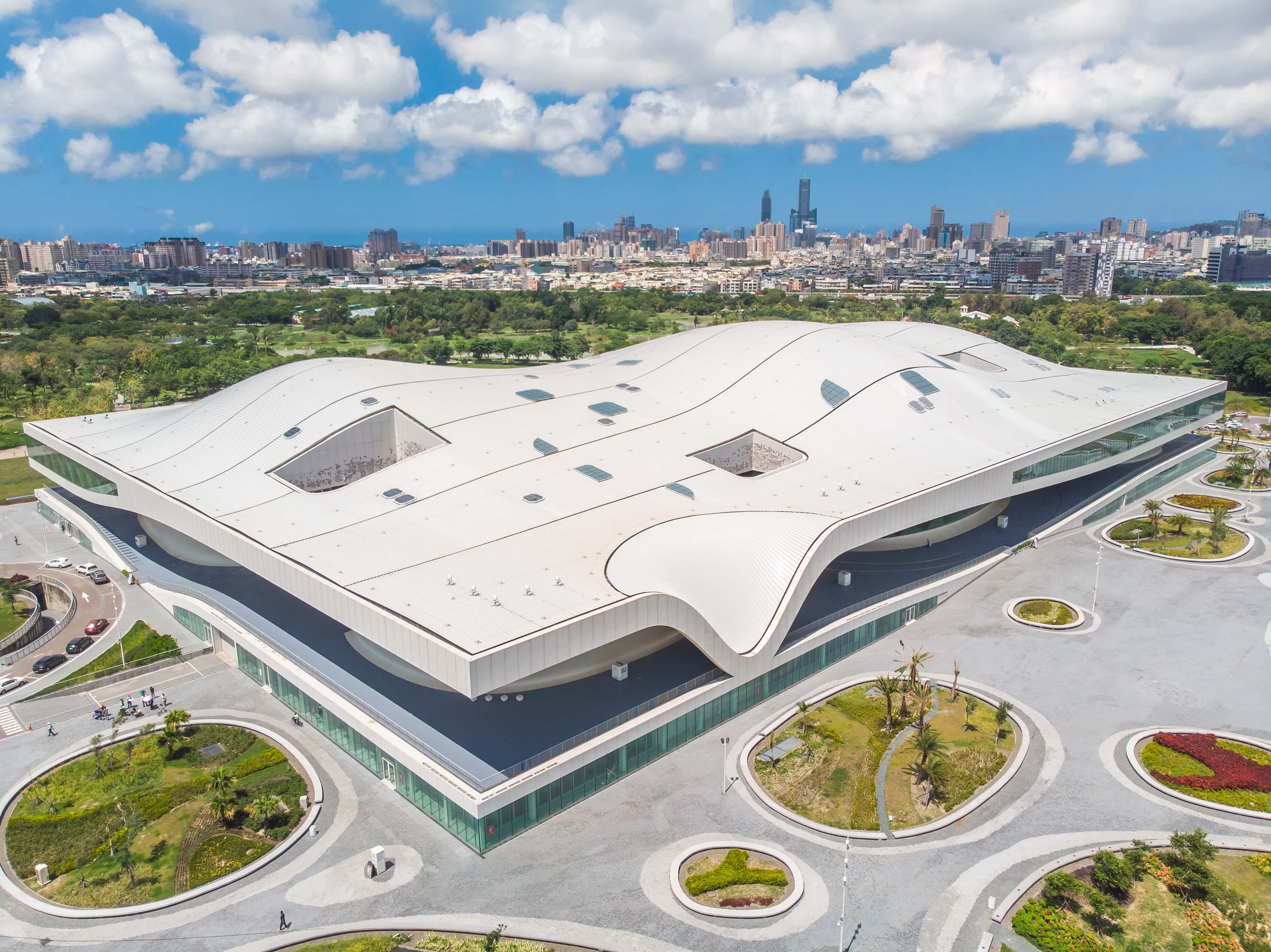
National Kaohsiung Center for the Arts

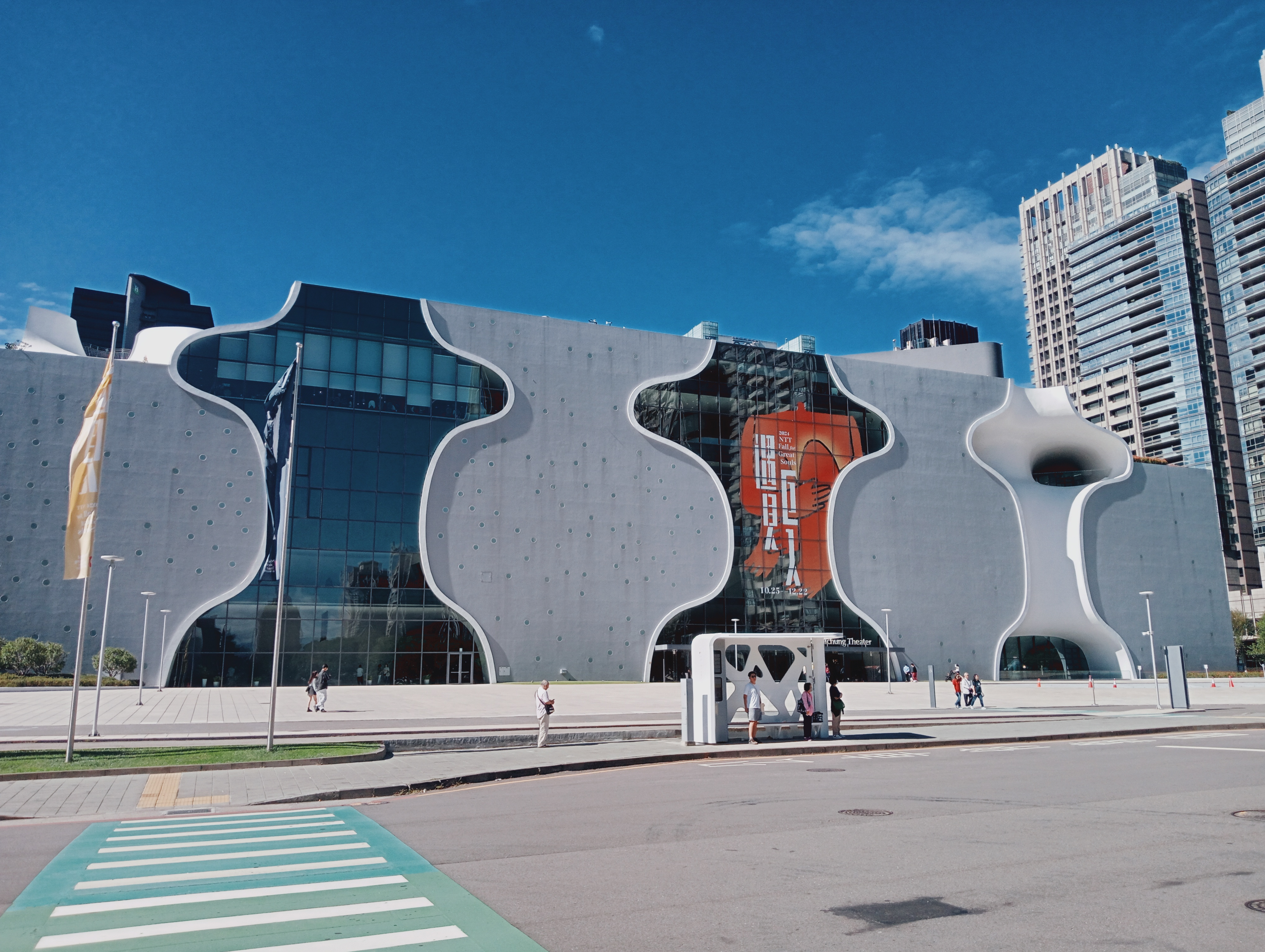
National Taichung Theater
