= National Theater and Concert Hall =

Performing arts centre in Taipei, Taiwan

- 國家戲劇院

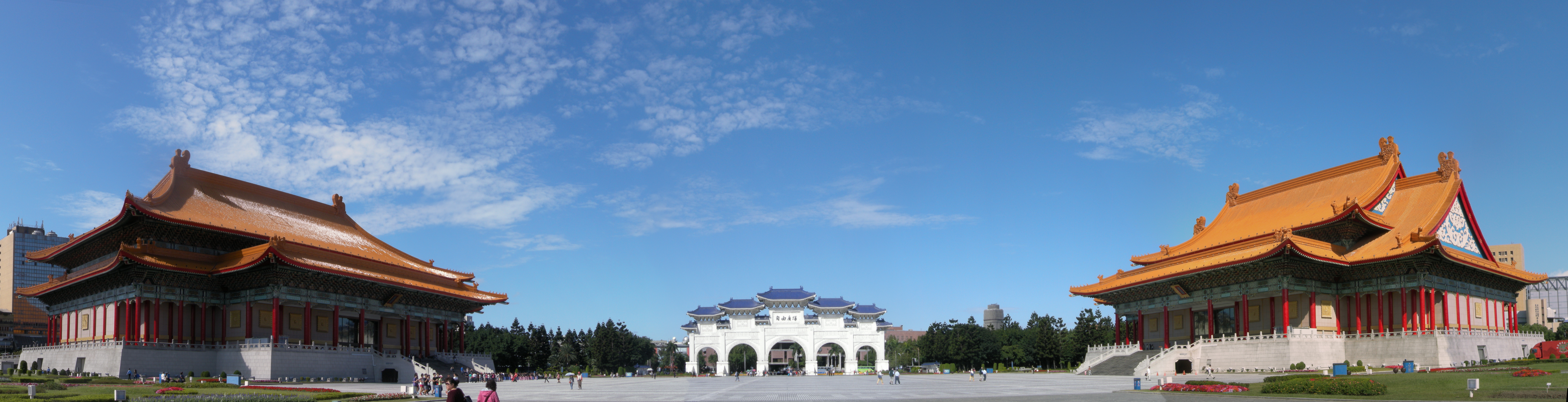
- The National Theater (right) and the National Concert Hall (left)
- Interactive map of National Theater and Concert Hall
- Address: 10048 Chung-Shan South Road
- Location: Zhongzheng, Taipei, Taiwan
- Coordinates: 25°2′6″N 121°31′5″E
- Owner: National Performing Arts Center
- Capacity: 1,526 (National Theater); 2,074 (Concert Hall)
- Public transit: Chiang Kai-shek Memorial Hall

Construction
- Opened: 1987
- Architect: Yang Cho-cheng

Website
- www.ntch.edu.tw

National Theater and Concert Hall

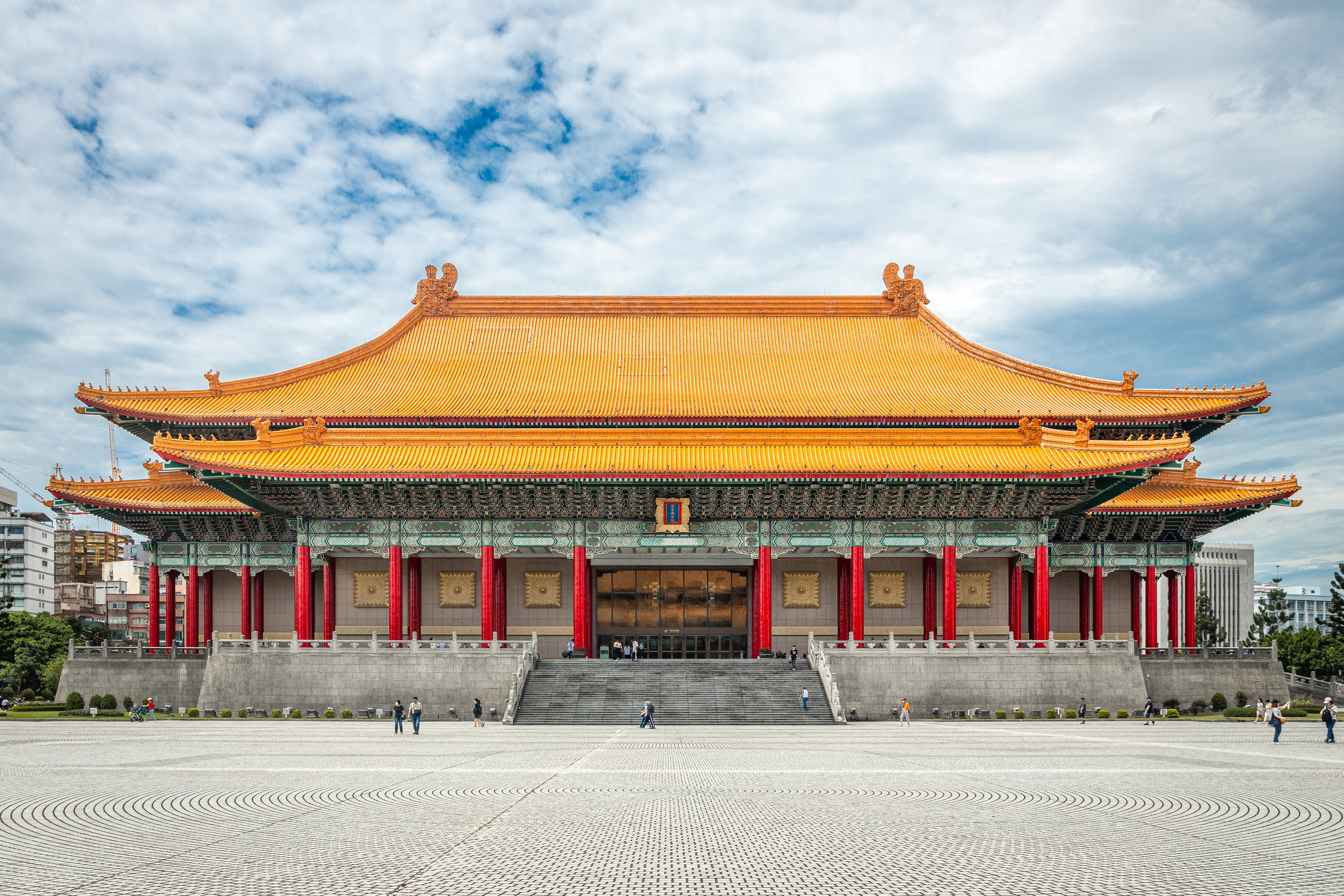
National Theater

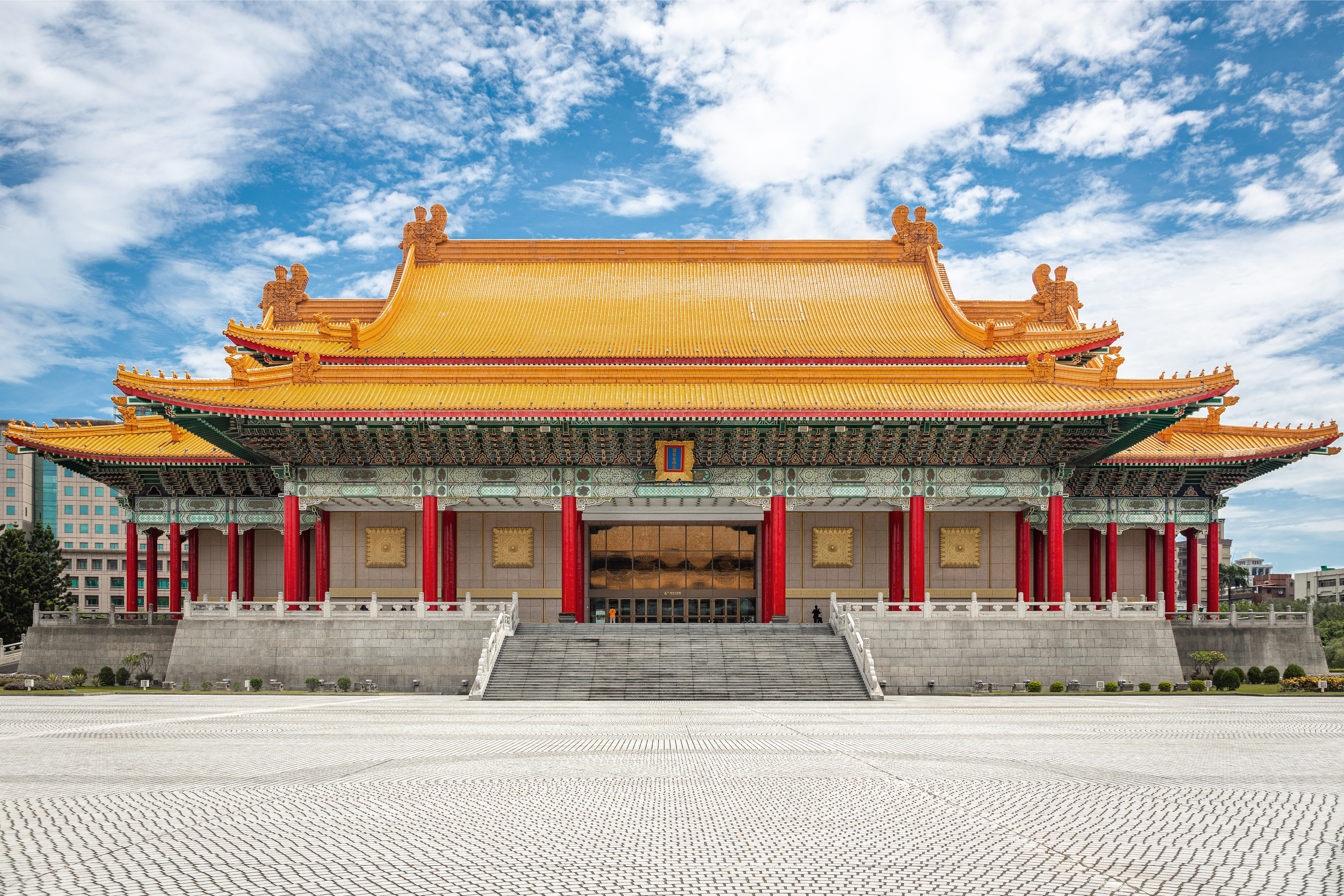
National Concert Hall

The National Theater (Chinese: 國家戲劇院; pinyin: Guójiā Xìjù Yuàn; Pe̍h-ōe-jī: Kok-ka Hì-kio̍k-īⁿ) and National Concert Hall (Chinese: 國家音樂廳; pinyin: Guójiā Yīnyuè Tīng; Pe̍h-ōe-jī: Kok-ka Im-ga̍k-thiaⁿ), or together the National Theater and Concert Hall (NTCH; Chinese: 國家兩廳院), are twin performing arts venues at Liberty Square in Zhongzheng District, Taipei, Taiwan. Completed in 1987, the landmarks stand on the south and north sides of the square with Chiang Kai-shek Memorial Hall to the east.

The square itself sits near Ketagalan Boulevard, site of the Presidential Office Building, the National Central Library, the National Taiwan Museum, and the 228 Peace Memorial Park.

== History ==
The National Theater and National Concert Hall are two of the first major modern performing arts facilities to be established in Asia. Upon the death of Chiang Kai-shek in 1975, the Kuomintang government authorized the construction of a monument and cultural arts facilities on the grounds of a memorial plaza. The project cost TWD 7.4 billion.

Yang Cho-cheng and Architects and Engineers Associates were responsible for the overall design. The buildings, though modern in function and purpose, recall traditional elements of Chinese palace architecture. The G+H Company of Germany and Philips, based in The Netherlands, played leading roles in the design of the interior facilities, stage lighting and acoustics. Civil engineering issues were handled by Ret-Ser Engineering Agency, Veterans Affairs Council. Six directors oversaw the project from initial planning sessions to final completion: Jou Tsuo-Min, Chang Chih-liang, Liu Feng-shueh, Hu Yao-heng, Li Yen and Chu Tzung-ching. The structures were completed on 20 September 1987, and officially opened their doors the following month as venues of the "National Chiang Kai-shek Cultural Center". Vice President Lee Teng-hui and Premier Yu Kuo-hua presided over the opening ceremonies for the two buildings on 31 October 1987.

Mass democracy rallies at the Liberty Square in 1990 launched Taiwanese society on a quick but peaceful transition from one-party authoritarian rule to pluralistic democracy. In 1999, the Ministry of Education under the administration of Lee Teng-Hui, Taiwan's first elected president, consolidated the governing bodies of the National Theater and Concert Hall with those of the National Symphony Orchestra, National Chinese Orchestra and National Chorus. In 2004 this larger organization became an autonomous executive body, the National CKS Cultural Center, headed by an artistic director reporting to a board of directors.

Each structure can host at least two events simultaneously. The National Theater contains a smaller Experimental Theater and the National Concert Hall holds a more intimate Recital Hall. Outdoor performances can be staged simultaneously on the square. The pipe organ by Flentrop Orgelbouw in the National Concert Hall was the largest organ in Asia at the time of its installation in 1987. Both structures house art galleries, libraries, shops, and restaurants. The National Theater houses a Performing Arts Library and publication offices for Taiwan's Performing Arts Review.

National Theater and Concert Hall, like all performing arts venues in capital cities, play diplomatic as well as artistic roles. Guests regularly include top elected leaders in Taiwan as well as international artists and dignitaries. Visitors over the years have included Margaret Thatcher of the UK, Mikhail Gorbachev of the USSR, Lee Kuan Yew of Singapore, Rafael Calderón Muñoz of Costa Rica and former First Lady Betty Ford of the U.S.

== Performance Venues ==
In addition the two buildings, National Theater and National Concert Hall, the outdoor NTCH Plaza can also be used to host outside broadcasts and performances.

Artistic styles and traditions from across the world are represented in the halls' events, including kabuki theater, Shakespearean drama, Taiwanese opera and puppet drama, Verdi opera, African dance, Beijing opera, Broadway shows, Wagnerian music drama, American jazz, Parisian comic opera, and Latin dance. Both venues are the site of a variety of festivals and special events, including the Taipei International Arts Festival, a series of International Arts Festivals ("Call Out in Ecstasy", "Poetic Essays with Lively Meanings"), the British Theatre Festival, the Chinese Drama Festival, and the Taipei Film Festival. The buildings regularly provide a backdrop to outdoor events on Liberty Square, including visits to Taiwan by foreign leaders and the annual Taipei Lantern Festival.

The Classic 20 festival in 2007-2008 commemorated the twentieth anniversary of the halls. The festival season featured visits by Tadashi Suzuki, Philip Glass, Robert Wilson, the Bavarian Radio Symphony Orchestra and the Deutsche Oper am Rhein as well as the Cloud Gate Dance Theater, Yang Li-hua Taiwanese Opera (楊麗花歌仔戲), Performance Workshop Theater (表演工作坊) and New-Classic Dance Company (新古典舞團).

=== National Theater ===
The National Theater contains two performance venues. The main theater is Proscenium Arch Theater (1498 seats); the smaller Experimental Theater is a flexible "Black Box Theater".

Performers who have appeared in the National Theater include the Cloud Gate Dance Theater, The Kirov Ballet, the Suzuki Company of Toga and its director Tadashi Suzuki, Yang Li-hua Taiwanese Opera, the Ming Hwa Yuan Theater Troupe, the Fei Ma Yu Opera Troupe and Pili Heroes, kabuki performer Bandō Tamasaburō V, stage director Robert Wilson, and dancers Martha Graham, Merce Cunningham, Rudolph Nureyev, Pina Bausch, Trisha Brown, Liu Feng-hsueh, Lin Hwai-min, Lo Man-fei, Yu Hao-yen and Liu Shao-lu.

=== National Concert Hall ===
The National Concert Hall contains two performance venues. The main hall is the Concert Hall (2022 seats); the smaller is the Recital Hall (354 seats).

International performers in the National Concert Hall have included composers Philip Glass and Samuel Adler and Fredrick Ernest, sopranos Jessye Norman, Barbara Hendricks and Mirella Freni, tenors Plácido Domingo, José Carreras and Luciano Pavarotti, baritone Bryn Terfel, violinists Pinchas Zukerman, Hilary Hahn and Akiko Suwanai, cellists Mstislav Rostropovich and Yo-Yo Ma, pianists Pi-hsien Chen, Nobuyuki Tsujii, Ruth Slenczynska, Tatiana Nikolayeva, Fou Ts'ong and Vladimir Ashkenazy, conductors Simon Rattle, Günther Herbig, Mei-Ann Chen, Sergiu Celibidache, Michael Tilson Thomas, Apo Hsu, Helmuth Rilling and Lorin Maazel.

American virtuoso organist John Walker has frequently performed at the Concert Hall, beginning in 1992. Since then, he has played both as soloist and with various orchestras, including Taiwan's National Symphony Orchestra.

Ensembles appearing at the Hall include the Juilliard String Quartet, the Royal Concertgebouw Orchestra of Amsterdam, the Vienna Philharmonic Orchestra, the Czech Philharmonic, the Berlin Philharmonic Orchestra, the Munich Philharmonic Orchestra, the Bavarian Radio Symphony Orchestra, the San Francisco Symphony Orchestra, the Shanghai Symphony Orchestra and the Vienna Boys Choir. Concerts by visiting orchestras are often broadcast to overflow crowds numbering in the thousands who fill the Square. Professional Taiwanese ensembles that regularly appear in the hall include the National Symphony Orchestra, the Taipei Symphony Orchestra, the National Taiwan Symphony Orchestra, the Evergreen Symphony Orchestra, the Taipei Chinese Orchestra, the Taiwan National Choir, the Formosa Singers, and the Taipei Philharmonic Orchestra and Chorus.

== Nomenclature ==
The standard abbreviation NTCH (National Theater and Concert Hall) refers to the Cultural Center in its entirety. NCH (National Concert Hall) refers to the concert hall alone.

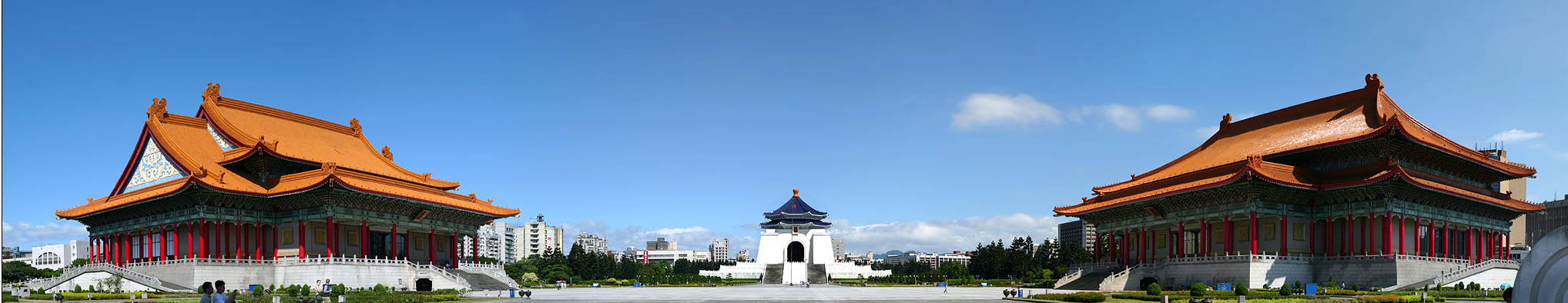
A panorama of the Liberty Square looking east, with the National Concert Hall (left) and the National Theater (right)
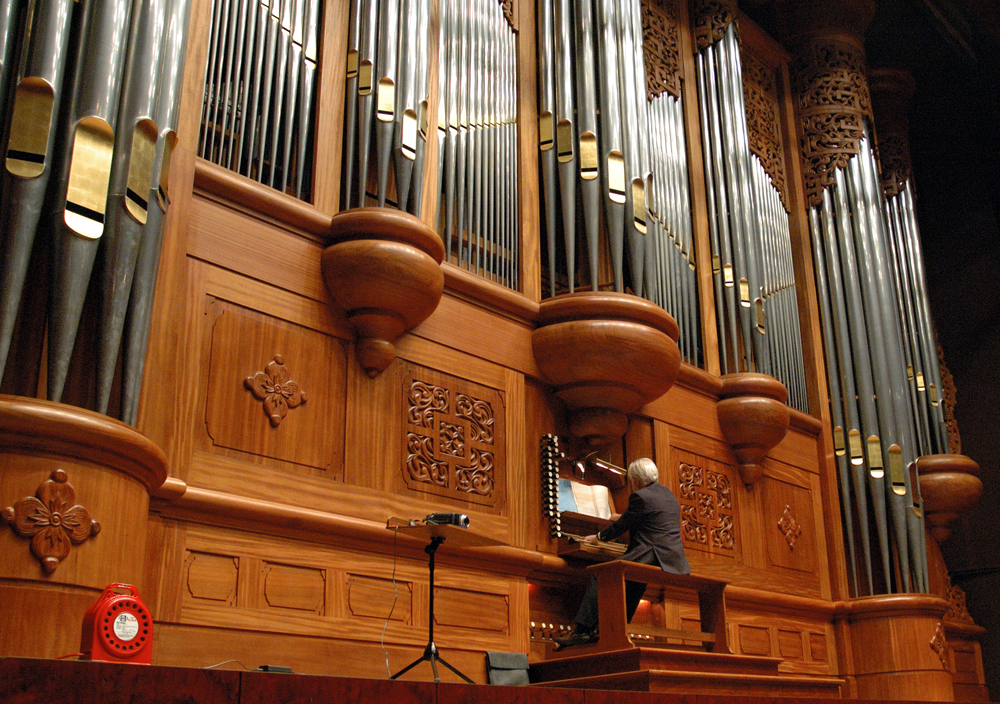
The pipe organ in Taiwan's National Concert Hall was the largest in Asia when installed in 1987.

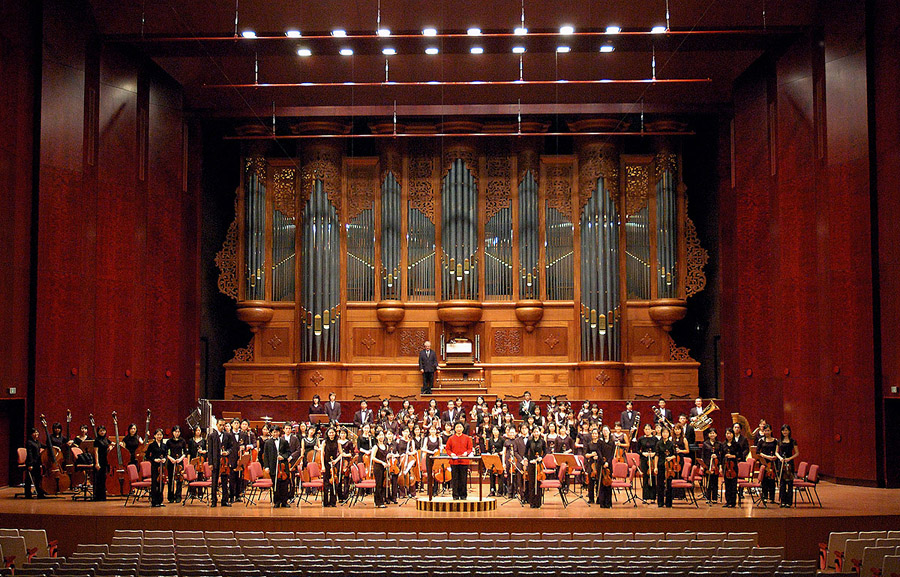
Apo Hsu and the NTNU Symphony Orchestra on stage in the National Concert Hall.

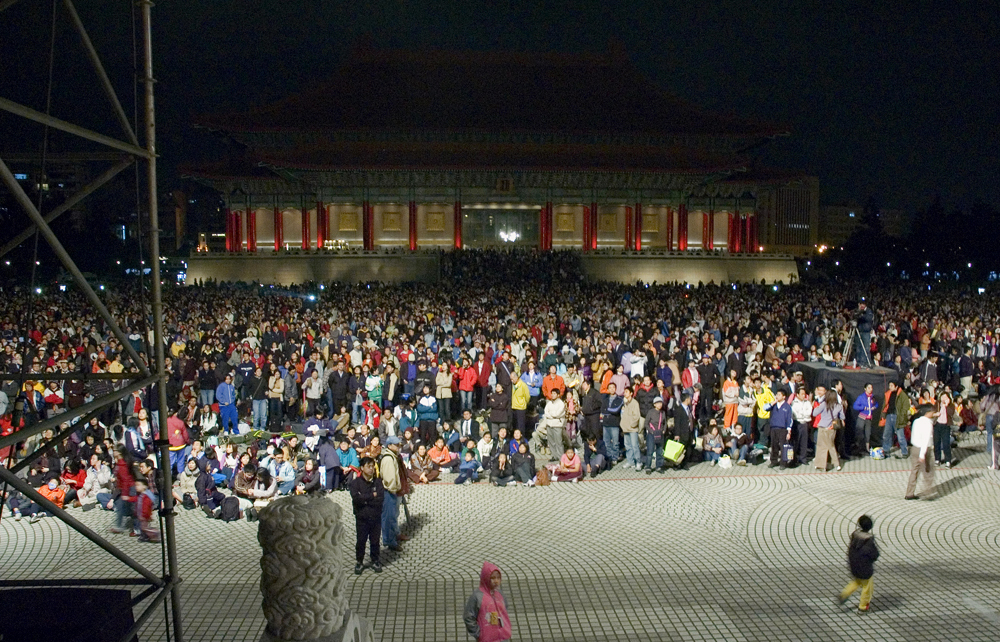
Thousands gather on Liberty Square in 2005 for a performance by Sir Simon Rattle and the Berliner Philharmoniker in National Concert Hall.

Performance of Haydn's Symphony No. 104 in D major, Hob.I:104 by the Evergreen Symphony Orchestra (10 March 2022)

National Concert Hall 360° panorama

== See also ==
- National Kaohsiung Center for the Arts
- National Taichung Theater
