= TTTC =

TTTC may refer to:

- Taiwan Traditional Theatre Center, a performance center in Taipei, Taiwan
- The Things They Carried, a collection of linked short stories by American novelist Tim O'Brien
