= Liu Shueh-shuan =

Taiwanese composer

- 劉學軒
- Born: 4 March 1969 (age 56); Changhua County, Taiwan
- Occupation: Composer

Liu Shueh-shuan (Chinese: 劉學軒; pinyin: Liú Xuéxuān; born 4 March 1969) is a Taiwanese composer. He has written works for the Erhu, and his music combines elements of traditional and modern cultures in eclectic musical styles.

== Life and career ==
Liu was born in Chang-hua, Taiwan. His composition, “Gui-Ze”, was awarded the gold medal in the Council for Cultural Affairs 2003 Traditional Music Composition Contest (ensemble category); meanwhile, his “Second Erhu Concerto” awarded the Silver Medal (concerto category), and “Busia 1930” won him the Bronze Medal (orchestra category) in the 2002 Contest.

Liu's works include “Painting of Li Mei-Shu – for Orchestral suite” and “Stone-Lion of San-Shia-Zu-Shi Temple – for Orchestra”. In Paris, the National Chinese Orchestra premiered Liu's “Mulakuna”, a piece composed through morse code, with a combination of eastern and western instruments to highlight the destruction and impact brought by civilization.

Upon invitation by the National Chinese Orchestra under the Ministry of Education, Liu composed “Song of the Tsou Tribe” based on Taiwanese aboriginal folk music and toured throughout Europe. At the end of 2000, he was invited to write “The Wish” for the “New Century Concert”. The piece depicts the mixture of anxiety and pleasure with the advent of the New Year, reflected by the 300 audience attendees singing out the optimism and spirit of the Taiwanese people. In addition, his “First Erhu Concerto”, composed for the International Erhu Competition, is highly acclaimed by Erhu players due to its adoption of groundbreaking Erhu techniques and original musical language. Other accomplishments range from his participation in the Golden Melody winning children's album “Red Dragonfly” and “Firebug”, to the commission of Taipei's Lantern Festival's musical themes of 2001 and 2002.

Liu's recent works include “Song of the Yami Tribe” for The Taipei Municipal Chinese Classical Orchestra, “Kavalan-Fantasia Overture” for The National Chinese Orchestra, and “Hugupuo Music Theater”. Liu was also invited to be the producer and musical director for the opening ceremony of 2001 National Olympics, and compose the soundtrack for “The Masters in Chinese History” series for the Public Television Service Foundation.
