= Too much information =

Too much information may refer to:

- Information overload, the notion that access to excessive information hampers understanding and decision-making
- Too Much Information (TV series), a Canadian comedy show (2014–2015)
- Too Much Information, a 2020 book by Cass Sunstein

== Music ==
- Too Much Information (album), a 2014 album by Maxïmo Park

=== Songs ===
- "Too Much Information" (song), a song by Duran Duran from the 1993 album Duran Duran
- "Too Much Information" (The Police song), from their 1981 album Ghost in the Machine
- "Too Much Information", a 1999 song by Quiet Riot, from the album Alive and Well
- "Too Much Information", a 2010 song by Railroad Earth

== See also ==
- TMI (disambiguation)
