= National Taichung Theater =

Opera house in Taichung

- 臺中國家歌劇院

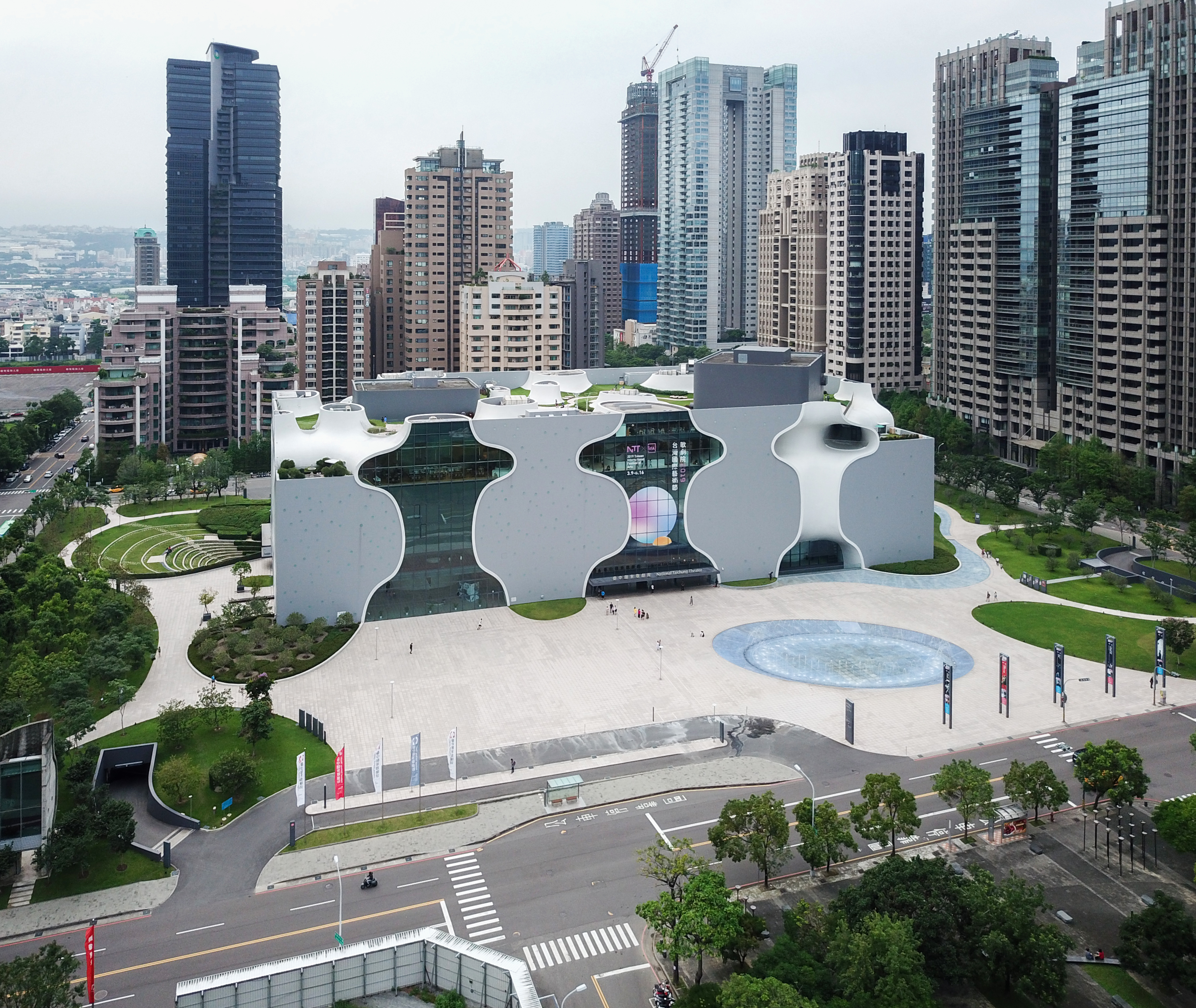
- Interactive map of National Taichung Theater
- Address: No. 101, Section 2, Huilai Road
- Location: Situn, Taichung, Taiwan
- Coordinates: 24°9′46″N 120°38′26″E
- Owner: National Performing Arts Center
- Capacity: 2,014 (grand theater)
- Type: Opera house

Construction
- Opened: 23 November 2014 (partial); 30 September 2016 (official)
- Architect: Toyo Ito
- Structural engineer: Evergreen Consulting Engineering

Website
- www.npac-ntt.org/en

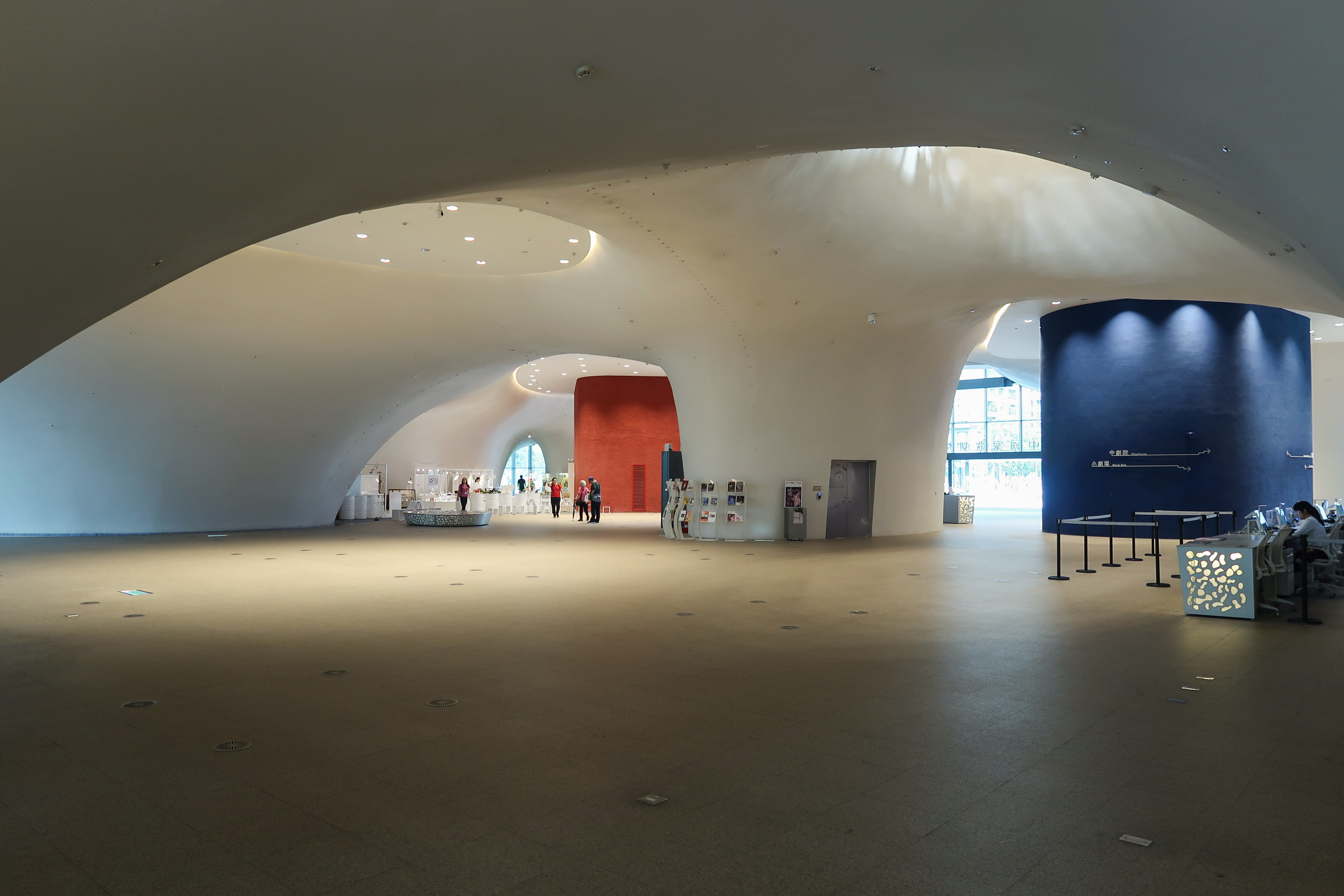
Level 1 lobby

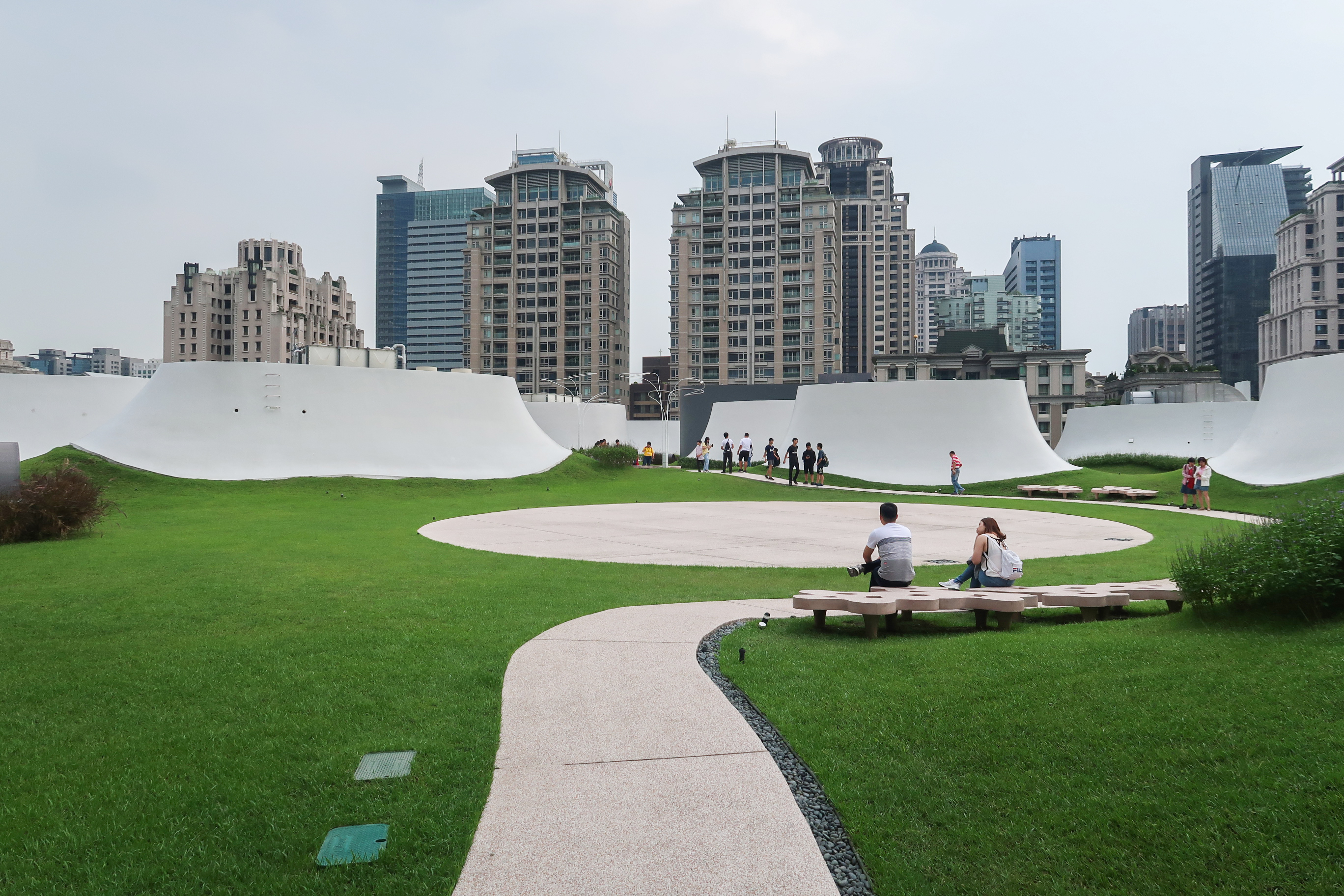
Level 6 Sky Garden

The National Taichung Theater (Chinese: 臺中國家歌劇院; pinyin: Táizhōng Guójiā Gējù Yuàn; Pe̍h-ōe-jī: Tâi-Tiong Kok-Ka Koa-Ke̍k-Īⁿ) is an opera house in the Taichung's 7th Redevelopment Zone in the Xitun District of Taichung, Taiwan. The estimated area of the structure is 57,685 square meters (620,920 sq ft). It was designed by Japanese architect Toyo Ito in collaboration with Cecil Balmond at Arup AGU. It was contracted on 11 November 2009 with construction planned for 45 months. The venue had a partial opening on 23 November 2014. It was officially opened in 2016.

== History ==
- 1992: Taiwan government first proposed as National Musical House
- 2002: Jason Hu proposed to build in Taichung
- 2003: 6 billion TWD was allocated to the budget
- 2006: Contracted with a local company
- 2009: Contract signed with Toyo Ito
- 23 November 2014: Completed, opening ceremony held
- 2015: Closed for additional works to improve safety of visitors
- 25 August 2016: The National Taichung Theater became an artistic affiliate of the National Performing Arts Center

== Gallery ==
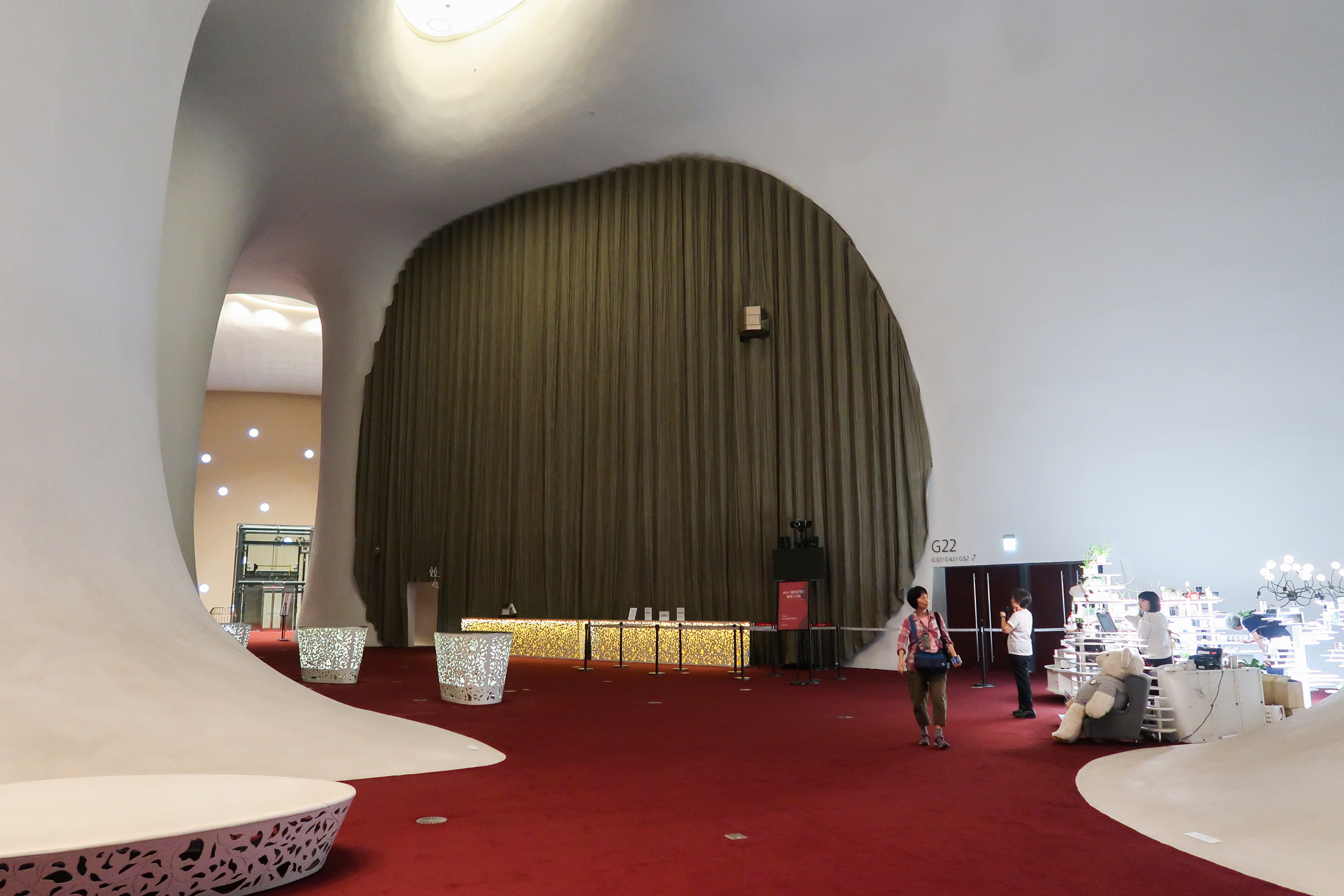
Main lobby

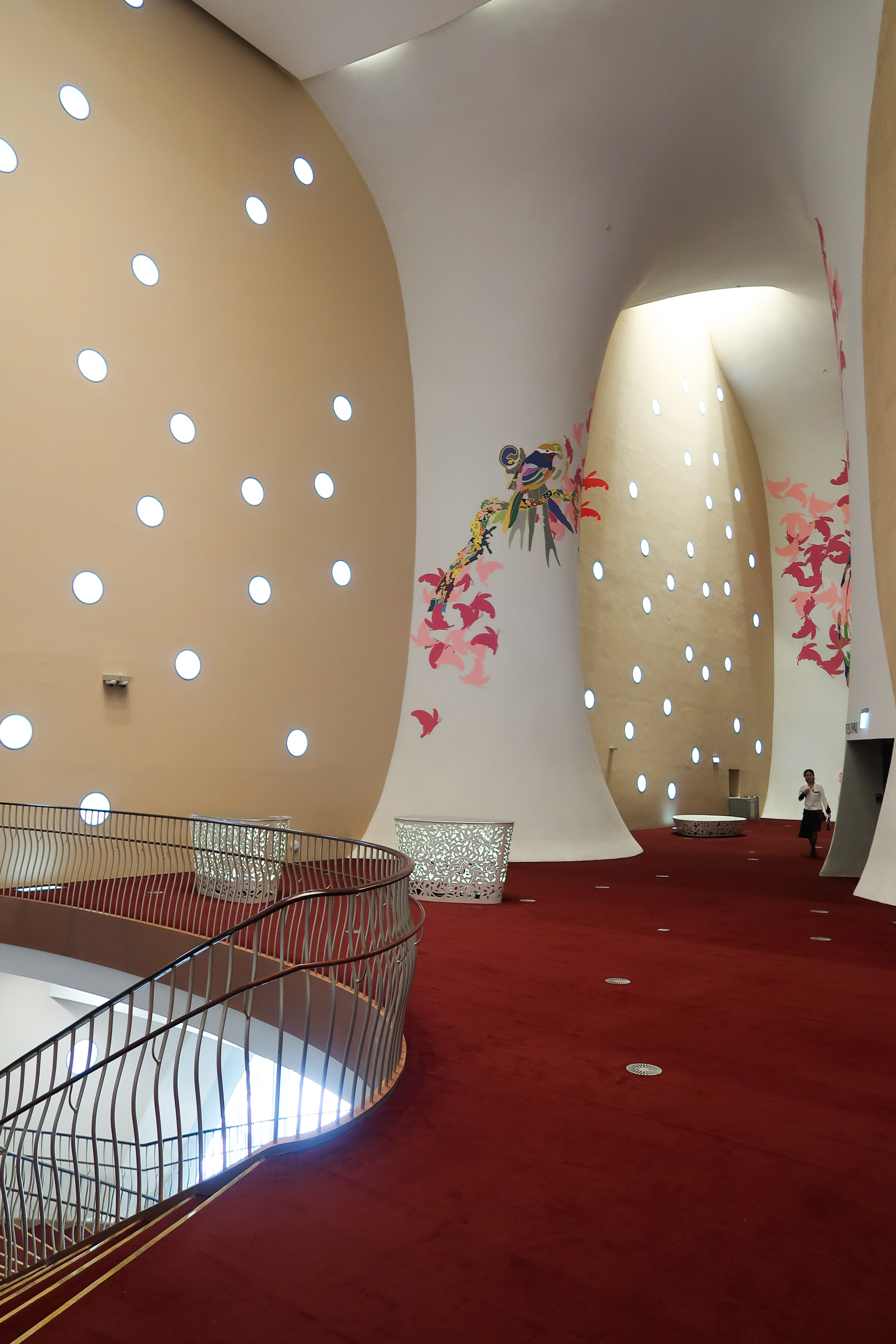
Breathing Holes in Level 2

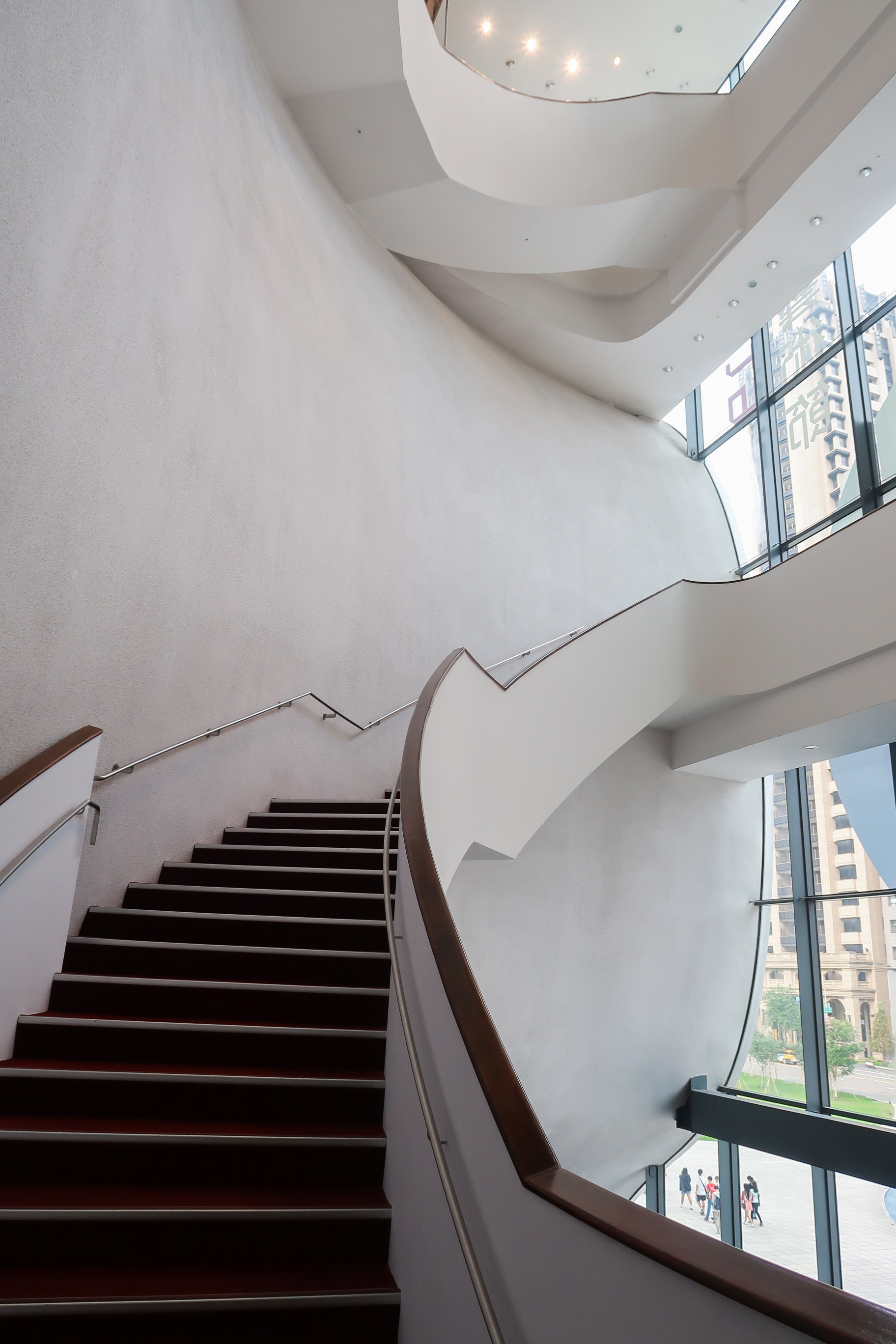
Stairway

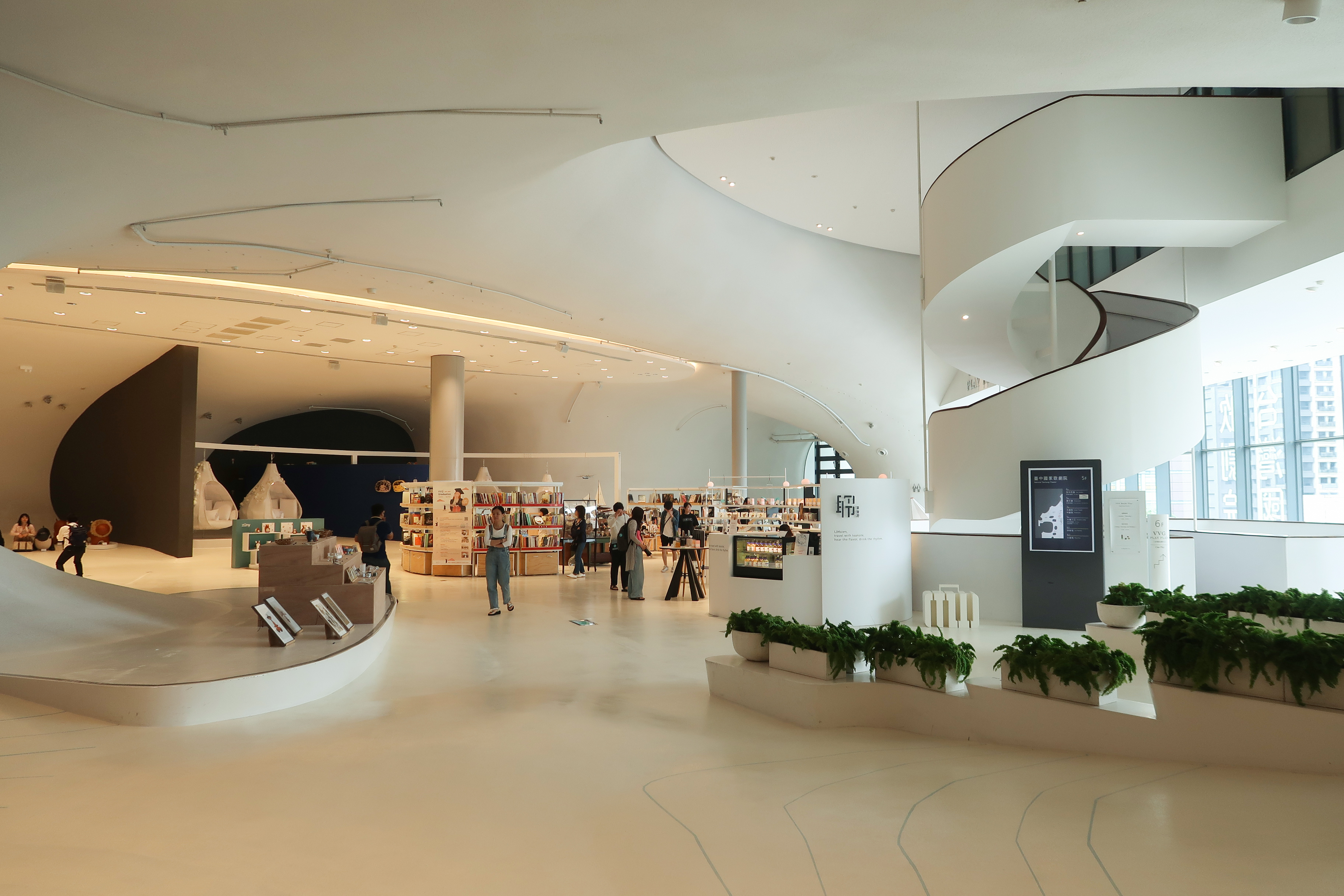
Level 5's gift shop

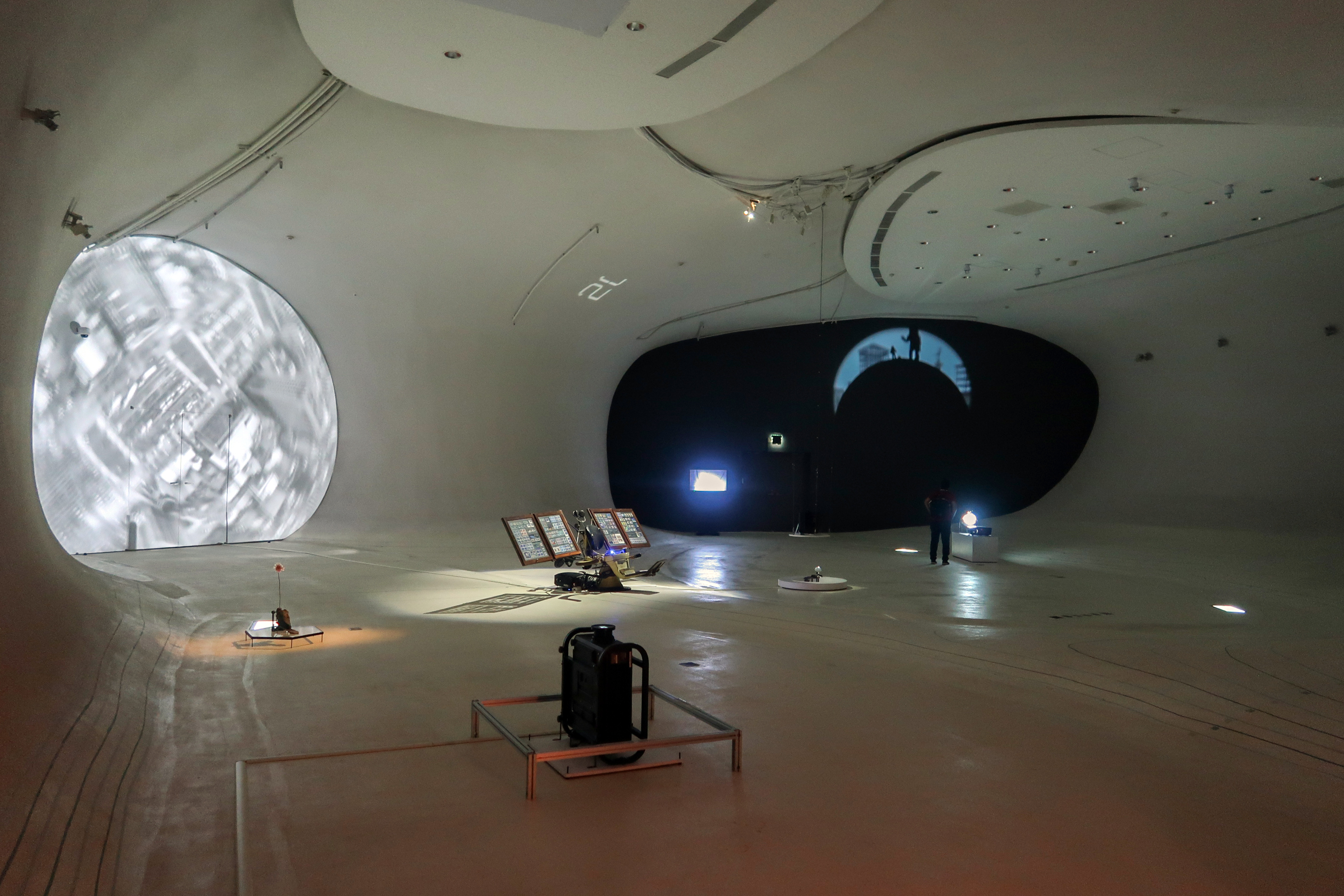
Level 5 Tutu Gallery

Main lobby

== See also ==
- National Kaohsiung Center for the Arts
- National Theater and Concert Hall, Taipei
