= Weiwuying metro station =

Metro station of the Kaohsiung MRT

Coordinates: 22°37′30″N 120°20′29″E

Weiwuying O10/Y18 衛武營
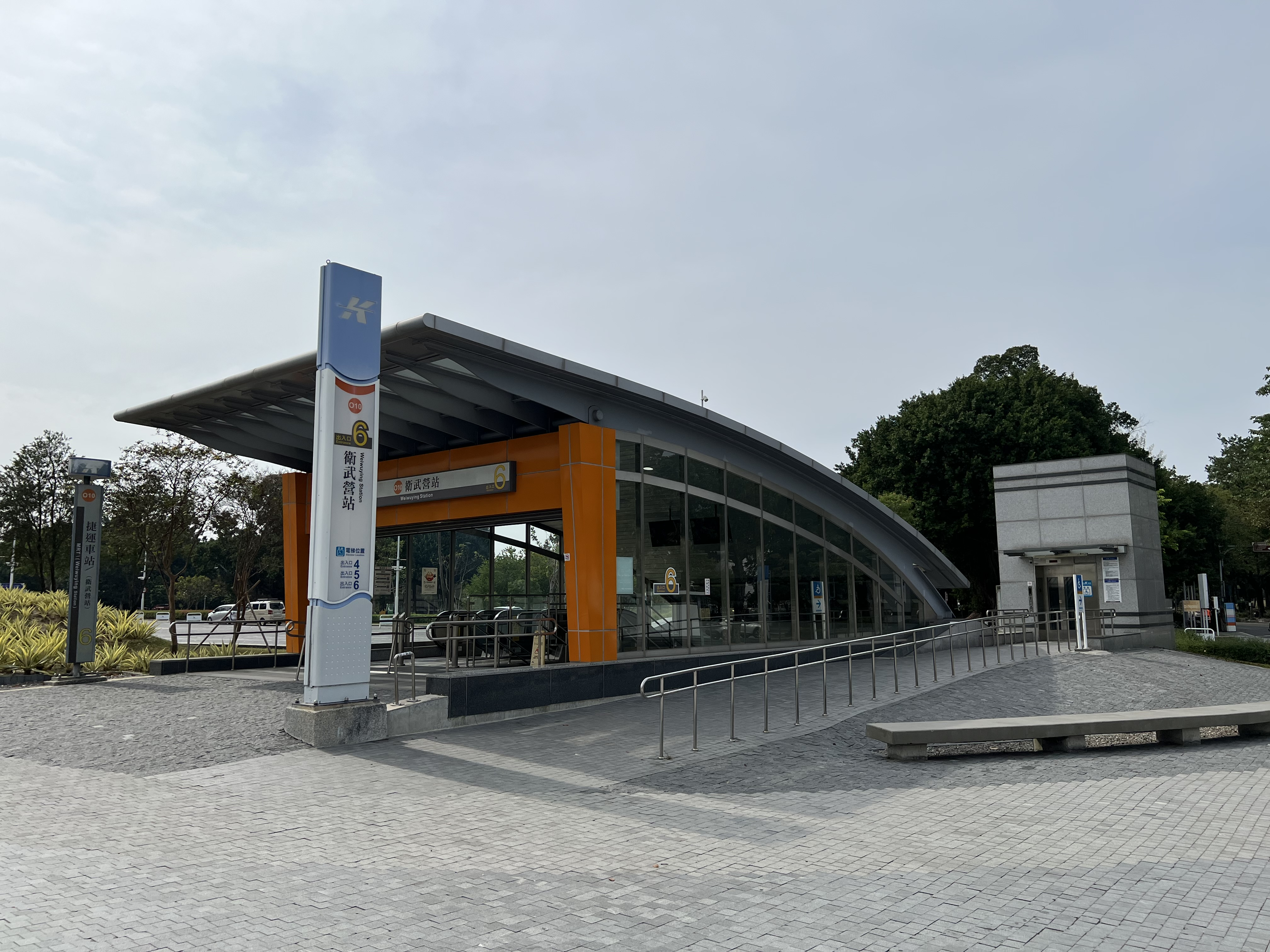
- Exit 6 of Weiwuying station

General information
- Location: Lingya and Fongshan, Kaohsiung; Taiwan
- Operated by: Kaohsiung Rapid Transit Corporation
- Lines: Orange line (O10); Yellow line (under construction)
- Platforms: One island platform
- Connections: Bus stop

Construction
- Structure type: Underground
- Accessible: Yes

History
- Opened: 2008-09-14

Passengers
- 2,886 daily (Jan. 2011)

Services
Preceding station	Kaohsiung Metro	Following station
Martial Arts Stadium towards Hamasen	Orange line	Fongshan West–City Council towards Daliao
Under construction
Sinjia towards Cruise Terminal or Cianjhen Senior High School	Yellow line	Zhengyi towards Dipu
Location

Weiwuying metro station
- Traditional Chinese: 衛武營站
- Simplified Chinese: 卫武营站
Transcriptions
Standard Mandarin
- Hanyu Pinyin: Wèiwǔyíng Chēzhàn
- Bopomofo: ㄨㄟˋ ㄨˇ ㄧㄥˊ ㄓㄢˋ
- Wade–Giles: Wei^{4}-wu^{3}-ying^{2} chan^{4}
- Tongyong Pinyin: Wèiwǔyíng Jhàn

Weiwuying is a station on the Orange line of the Kaohsiung MRT in Lingya District, Kaohsiung, Taiwan. It will be a future transfer station with the Yellow line.

== Station overview ==
This is a two-level, underground station with an island platform and five exits. It is 201 metres long and is located at the intersection of Jhongjheng 1st Rd. and Jianjyun Rd.

=== Station layout ===
Street level	Entrance/exit	Entrance/exit
B1	Concourse	Lobby, information desk, automatic ticket machines, one-way faregates, restrooms (near exit 2)
B2	Platform 1	← KMRT Orange line toward Hamasen (Martial Arts Stadium)
B2	Island platform, doors will open on the left
B2	Platform 2	KMRT Orange line toward Daliao (Fongshan West) →

=== Exits ===
- Exit 1: Jhongjheng 1st Rd. (north), Jhongjheng Senior High School, Kaohsiung Armed Forces General Hospital
- Exit 2: Jhongjheng 1st Rd. (south), Jhongjheng Park
- Exit 3: Sanduo Rd. (north), Jhongjheng Park
- Exit 4: Jianjyun Rd. (west), Kaohsiung Armed Forces General Hospital, Kaohsiung Mosque
- Exit 5: Jianjyun Rd. (east)
- Exit 6: Sanduo Rd. (south), Weiwuying Art & Culture Center, Weiwuying Mentropolitan Park

== Around the station ==
- Kaohsiung Mosque
- National Kaohsiung Center for the Arts
- Weiwuying Metropolitan Park
- Fengshan Sports Park
- Jhongjheng Park
- Jhongjheng Senior High School
- Kaohsiung Armed Forces General Hospital

== See also ==
- List of railway stations in Taiwan
