= Taiwan Music Institute =

Organization in Shilin, Taipei, Taiwan

Taiwan Music Institute 臺灣音樂館
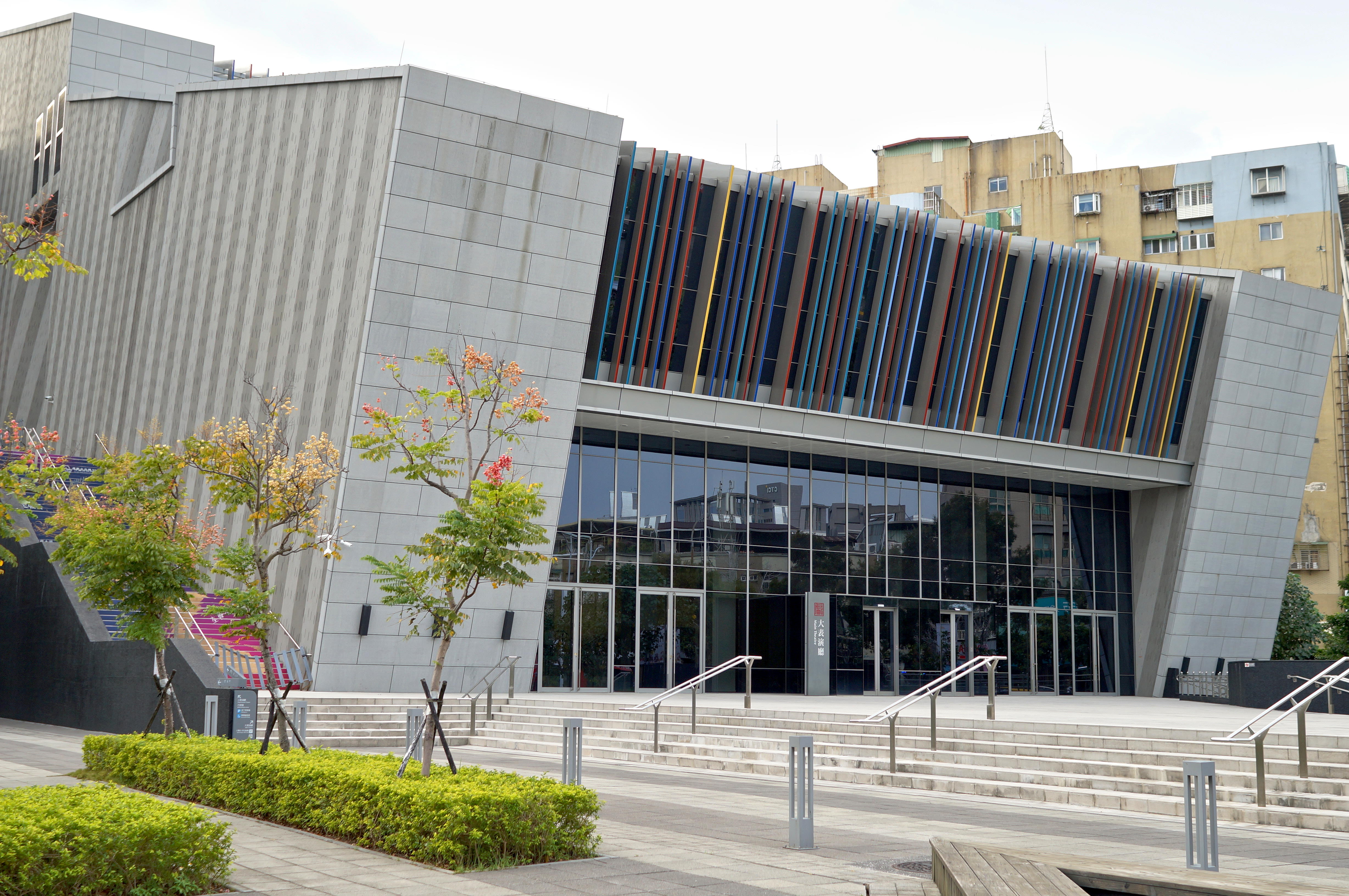
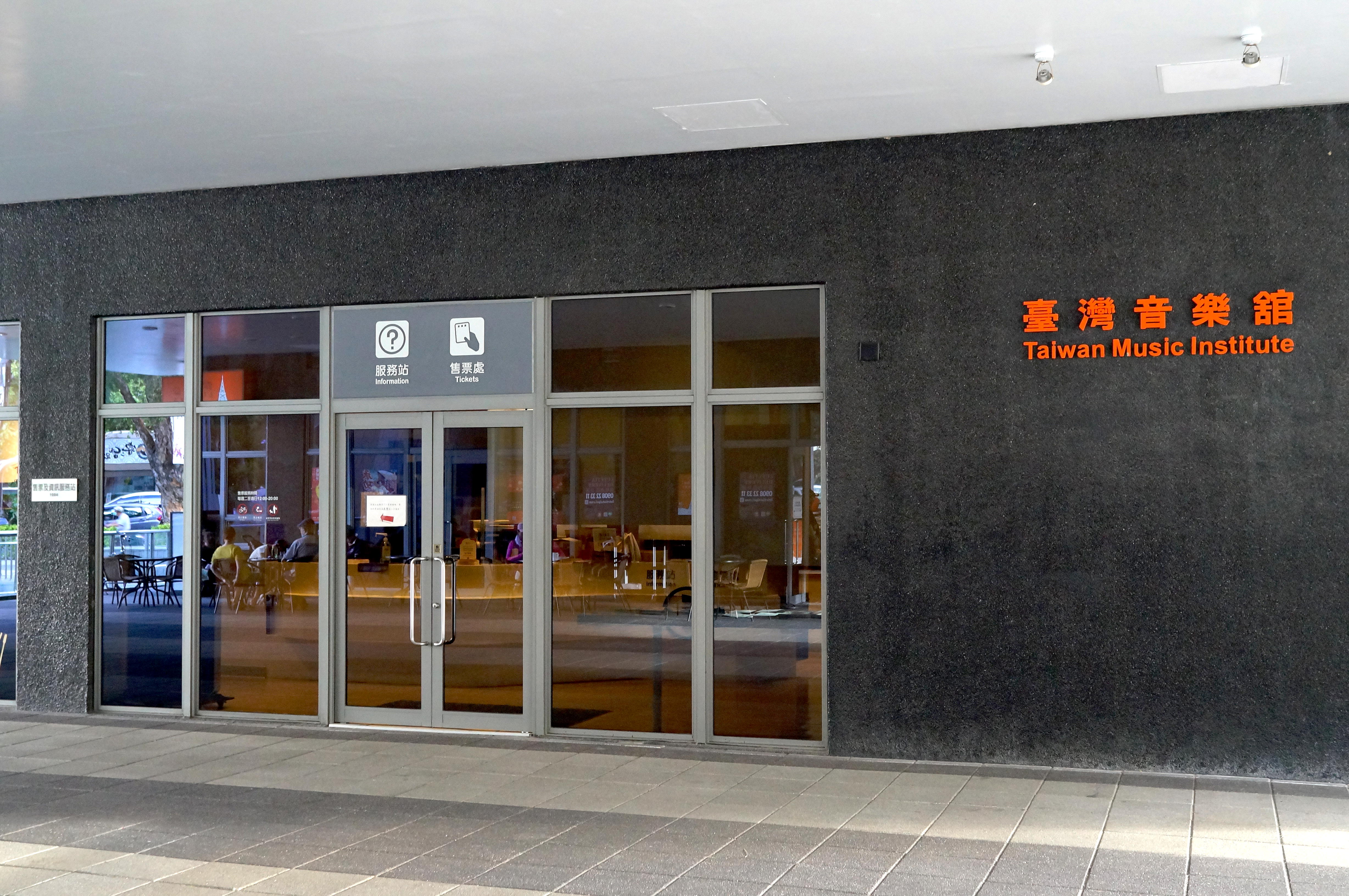
- Parent institution: National Center for Traditional Arts, Ministry of Culture (Taiwan)
- Founder: Council for Cultural Affairs
- Established: 1990
- Location: Shilin, Taipei, Taiwan
- Coordinates: 25°06′08.0″N 121°31′12.2″E
- Interactive map of Taiwan Music Institute 臺灣音樂館

The Taiwan Music Institute (TMI; traditional Chinese: 臺灣音樂館; simplified Chinese: 台湾音乐馆; pinyin: Táiwān Yīnyuè Guǎn), established in January 2002 and formerly known as the Research Institute of Musical Heritage and Taiwan Music Center, was renamed the Taiwan Music Institute in 2012 as a research, collection, exhibition and promotion organization for Taiwan music. It operates under the auspices of the National Center for Traditional Arts (NCFTA) under the Ministry of Culture. The Institute is located within the premises of Taiwan Traditional Theatre Center in Shilin District, Taipei City, and has a music archive on the second floor. The collection of books and audiovisual materials focuses on traditional ethnic music in Taiwan, supplemented by Asian, Pacific, and world ethnic music. Additionally, it showcases the archived musical artifacts of renowned Taiwanese musicians. The Institute welcomes public visits and offers reserved guided tours.

== History ==
In 1990, recognizing the need to comprehensively research, preserve, and promote the cultural heritage of ethnic music, the Council for Cultural Affairs of the Executive Yuan (now known as the Ministry of Culture) established the “Center of Musical Heritage Preparatory Team.” Liu Wann-Hong championed this initiative as the convener, and Hsu Tsang-Houei served as the vice-convener, jointly spearheading the necessary preparatory work of software and infrastructure.

By July 29, 1997, the Preparatory Office for the Center of Ethnic Music was officially operational. In line with government restructuring policies in June 2000, the Council for Cultural Affairs revisited its organizational mandate and functional priorities. Consequently, in January 2001, it merged with the Preparatory Office of the National Center for Traditional Arts (NCFTA).

In January 2002, with the issuance of the “Temporary Organization Regulations of the National Center for Traditional Arts” and the “Personnel Establishment Table of the National Center for Traditional Arts”, the National Center for Traditional Arts was officially inaugurated. This entailed the establishment of the “Research Institute of Ethnic Music” as its specialized branch, responsible for the investigation, collection, research, preservation, and promotion of ethnic music.

Initially, the Research Institute was situated at No. 26, Hangzhou N. Road, Zhongzheng District, Taipei City, and commenced operations to the public on October 29, 2003. In 2008, the organization’s name was changed to the Taiwan Music Center to reflect organizational reorganization. With the promulgation of the Organic Act of the National Center for Traditional Arts on June 29, 2011, and the subsequent establishment of the Ministry of Culture in May 2012, the Center was rebranded as the Taiwan Music Institute. March 2017 saw its relocation to No. 751, Wenlin Road, Shihlin District, Taipei City. The new premises, alongside its permanent exhibitions, were graciously unveiled to the public on October 3 of the same year.

== Duties and operations ==
Taiwan Music Institute is responsible for various tasks, including conducting research and studies on Taiwanese music; preserving and promoting music collections and exhibitions; establishing and managing the music audio-visual library and cloud database; nurturing musical talents; and fostering international music and cultural exchanges.

The Institute’s major responsibilities encompass: digitally archiving Taiwanese music artifacts, establishing the “Taiwan Music Cultural Map” and “The Online Database of Taiwanese Musicians”, editing and publishing the “Taiwan Music Yearbook”, and overseeing the adjudication process for “The Golden Melody Awards for Traditional Arts and Music.” Starting in 2018, the Institute has undertaken the “Reconstructing Music History in Taiwan Project”, which forms an integral part of the Forward-looking Infrastructure Development Program. This project aims to provide a platform dedicated to a systematic collection of musical historical materials, as well as conducting research, publication, and promotional activitiesc.

== See also ==
- Music of Taiwan
