= Weiwuying Metropolitan Park =

Park in Fengshan, Kaohsiung, Taiwan

- 衛武營都會公園
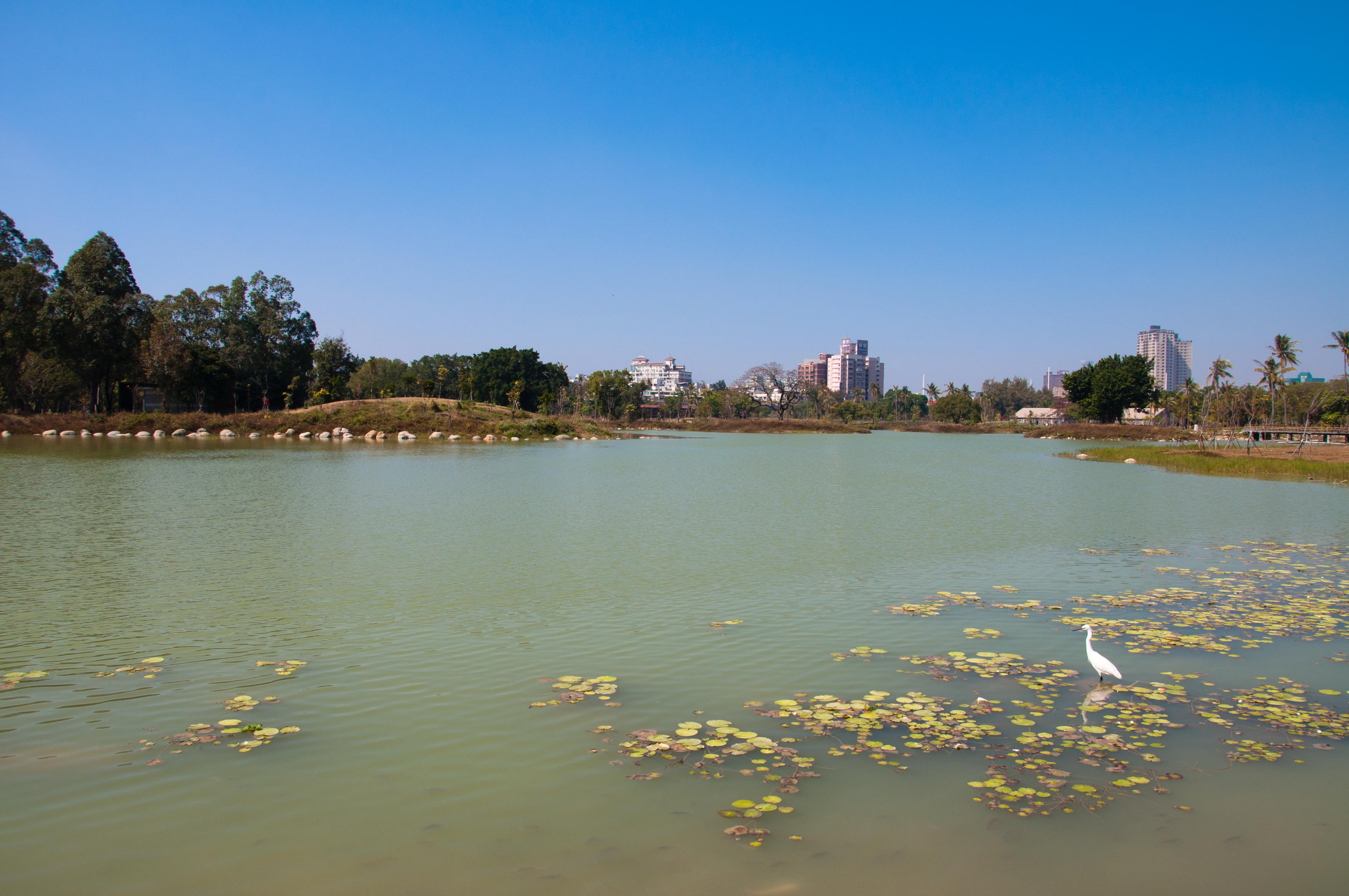
- Interactive map of Weiwuying Metropolitan Park
- Type: park
- Location: Fengshan, Kaohsiung, Taiwan
- Coordinates: 22°37′11.2″N 120°20′22.2″E
- Area: 47 hectares (120 acres)
- Established: 2010
- Public transit: Weiwuying Station

The Weiwuying Metropolitan Park (traditional Chinese: 衛武營都會公園; simplified Chinese: 卫武营都会公园; pinyin: Wèiwǔyíng Dūhuì Gōngyuán) is a metropolitan park (one type of Taiwan national park) in Fengshan District, Kaohsiung, Taiwan.

== History ==
During the Qing Dynasty rule of Taiwan, Fongshan was an important military area. During the Japanese rule, the Japanese viewed Kaohsiung as a base to develop the southern region of Taiwan and started to deploy armies and set up warehouses there called the Fongshan Warehouse. After the handover of Taiwan from Japan to the Republic of China in 1945, the Kuomintang government continued the military purpose of the camp until 1979, when the camp was deemed no longer suitable for military purposes.

In March 1992, a public hearing was held to determine the fate of the area. Civic group which advocated environmental protection and arts began to lobby for an ecological metropolitan park. After more than 10 years, a consensus was reached to convert the area into a park. Weiwuying Metropolitan Park was finally completed in 2010.

The park spans over an area of 47 hectares. It consists of lake, children playground and former barracks. On the north side of the park is the National Kaohsiung Center for the Arts.

== Transportation ==
The park is accessible within walking distance south from Weiwuying Station of Kaohsiung Metro.

== See also ==
- List of parks in Taiwan
