= National Chinese Orchestra Taiwan =

Chinese orchestra based in Taipei, Taiwan

- Chinese orchestra
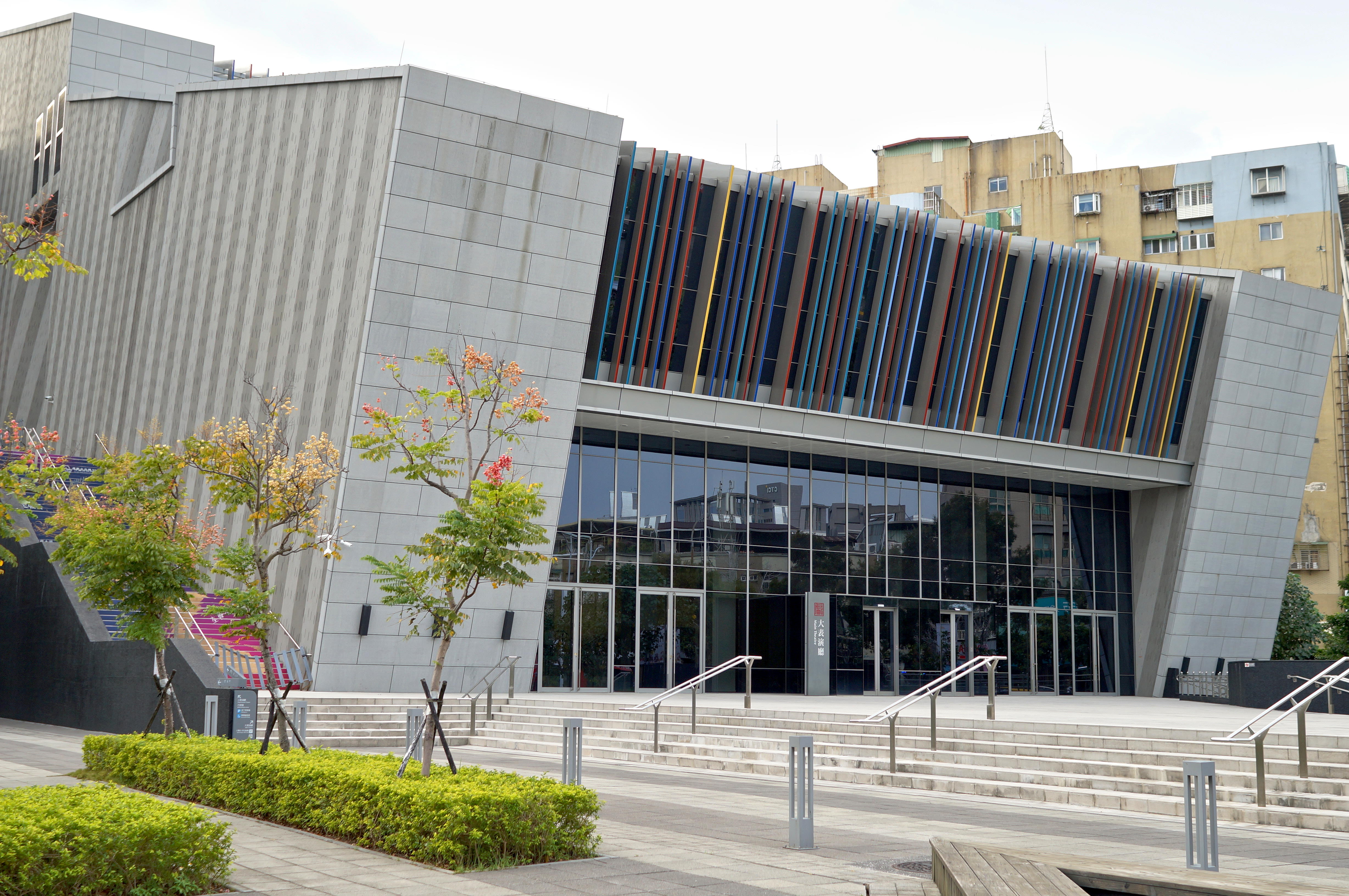
- Taiwan Traditional Theatre Center
- Native name: 臺灣國樂團
- Short name: NCO
- Former name: National Taiwan Academy of Arts Experimental Chinese Orchestra; National Chinese Orchestra
- Founded: 1984
- Location: Taipei, Taiwan
- Concert hall: Taiwan Traditional Theatre Center
- Website: ncfta.gov.tw/nco_133.html

The National Chinese Orchestra Taiwan (NCO; Chinese: 中華民國國立臺灣國樂團; pinyin: Zhōng Huá Mín Guó Guó Lì Táiwān Guó Yuètuán) is a national-level Chinese orchestra of Taiwan. It is currently a dispatched unit of the National Center for Traditional Arts under the Ministry of Culture. The orchestra is stationed at the Taiwan Traditional Theatre Center in Taipei City.

Originally established in 1984 under the Ministry of Education, the orchestra was formerly known as the National Taiwan Academy of Arts Experimental Chinese Orchestra. In May 2012, it formally adopted the name National Chinese Orchestra Taiwan in response to the establishment of the Ministry of Culture. In recent years, NCO progressively embrace concepts like recounting of Taiwan’s most beautiful stories with Chinese music, promoting local content and talent, connecting Taiwan with the world through music as its brand spirit, with performances incorporating elements from other disciplines such as drama, dance, fine art, poetry, literature, etc. The orchestra is also committed to promoting traditional Chinese music, going on tours to communities and schools in Taiwan, and representing Taiwan in cultural exchanges with other countries.

== History ==
In September 1984, the National Taiwan Academy of Arts (now National Taiwan University of Arts) Experimental Chinese Orchestra was established.

In February 1990, according to the Directions for the Establishment of Experimental Chinese Orchestra approved by the Executive Yuan, it was renamed as National Experimental Chinese Orchestra, which belonged to the Ministry of Education and was managed by the National Taiwan Academy of Arts.

In December 1999, the orchestra moved from the National Taiwan College of Arts (the original National Taiwan Academy of Arts) to what used to be the storage room for costumes on the 5th floor of the National Theater. The location became a rehearsal and office space, accommodating three sections: the administration, performance, research and promotion.

In 2002, the Executive Yuan approved the draft of an act, which aimed to corporatize the National Experimental Chinese Orchestra, the Taiwan Philharmonic (also known as the National Symphony Orchestra), and the Taiwan National Choir. However, the legislation process was incomplete.

In 2003, the Ministry of Education planned to transform these two orchestras and one choir entities into administrative corporations but was ultimately unsuccessful.

In 2006, renamed as the National Chinese Orchestra (abbreviated as NCO).

On January 1, 2008, NCO was transferred to the National Chiang Kai-shek Cultural Center for management. On March 6, renamed as National Chinese Orchestra Taiwan, and it was separated from the Ministry of Education and incorporated into the newly established Preparatory Office of the National Headquarters of Taiwan Traditional Arts (NHTTA) of the Council for Cultural Affairs under the Executive Yuan. Along with the National Center for Traditional Arts, Taiwan Music Institute, Taiwan BangZi Opera Company, and GuoGuang Opera Company, all became dispatched units under the same administrative structure, thus completing the legalization process of the orchestra.

On May 20, 2012, while the Council for Cultural Affairs was upgraded to the Ministry of Culture, together with the restructuring of the orchestra by the Preparatory Office of the National Headquarters of Taiwan Traditional Arts, the orchestra was renamed the National Chinese Orchestra Taiwan and was affiliated to the National Center for Traditional Arts.

In early 2017, NCO moved from the National Theater to the Taiwan Traditional Theatre Center, which is one of the venues operated by the National Center for Traditional Arts.

== The Orchestra Direction ==
The first five orchestra directors stem from being the presidents of the National Taiwan Academy of Arts, they are Chang Chih-liang, Ling Song-lang, Wang Ching-tai, Wang Ming-xian, Huang Kuang-nan; subsequent directors are Lin Yu-ting, Tchen Yu-chiou (acting), Chen Wei-hsien, Chou Hsiu-chin, Wang Lan-sheng, Li Yong-he, Wu Ting-che, Chen Yue-yi, and Liu Li-chen (current).

Before the orchestra was institutionalized, the principal conductors (music directors) were Li Shi-ming (principal conductor 1988–1999) and Qu Chunquan (principal conductor 1999–2007). After institutionalization, were succeeded by Wen Yi-jen (music director 2008–2009), Su Wen-cheng (2010–2011), Yan Hui-chang (2013–2017), and Chiang Ching-po (2020–).

== Recording ==
Music albums released include The Beautiful Taiwan; The Joyful Taiwan; My Heart Leaps Up; By Way of Remembrance; NCO 30th Anniversary; Where is Mauliyav?; Listen to the Soundscape of Taiwan; Taiwan in Bloom; Passing of Sound; The Legend of Parade Formation Performance; Sing, Pray, Pasibutbut-A Bunun Musical and so on.
