= National Kaohsiung Center for the Arts =

Art center in Fengshan, Kaohsiung, Taiwan

National Kaohsiung Center for the Arts Weiwuying
- 衛武營國家藝術文化中心

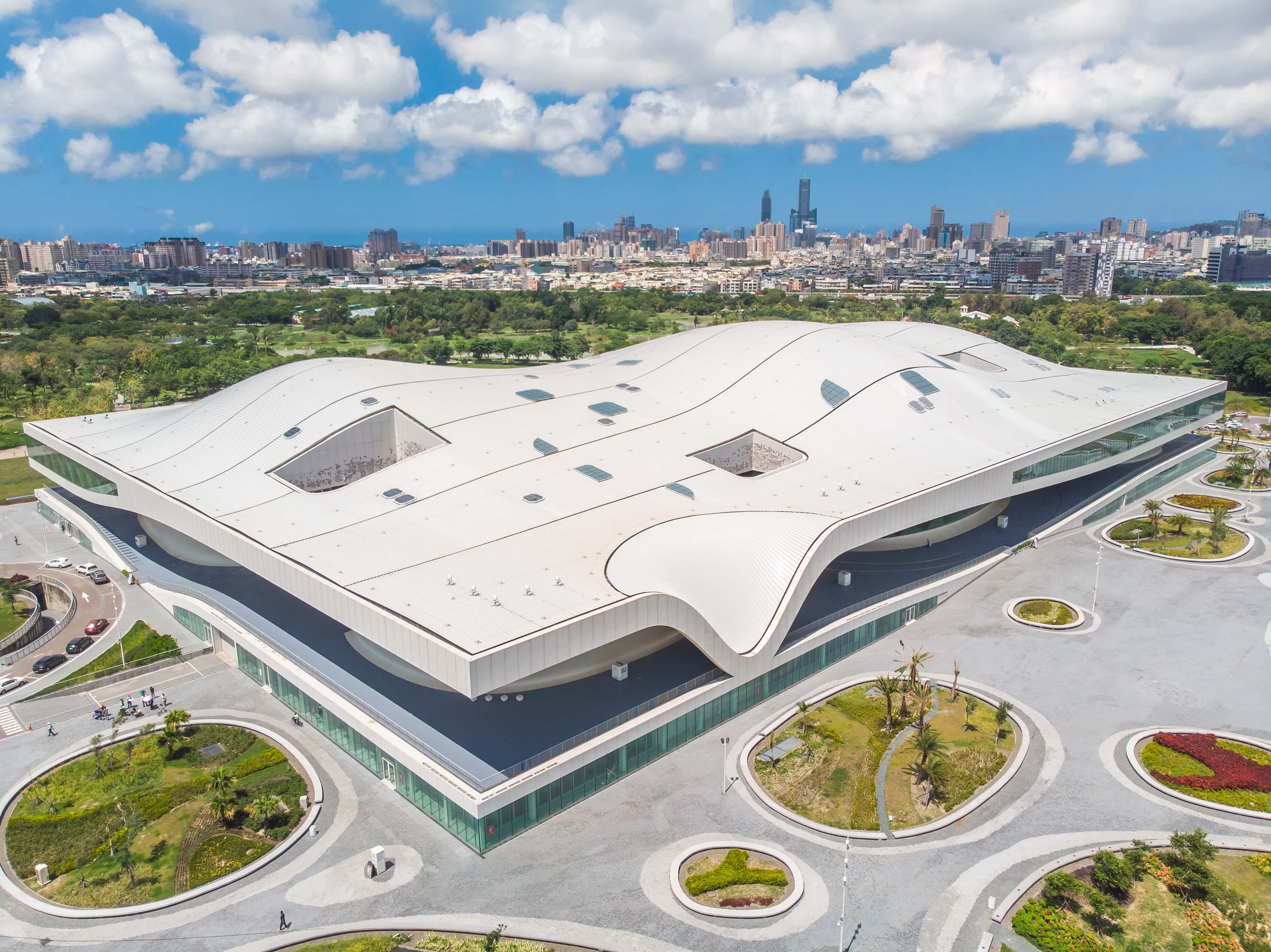

General information
- Type: Arts centre
- Location: Fengshan, Kaohsiung, Taiwan
- Coordinates: 22°37′23.6″N 120°20′33.0″E
- Completed: 2018
- Owner: National Performing Arts Center

Technical details
- Floor area: 3.3 hectares

Design and construction
- Architect: Francine Houben

Other information
- Public transit: Weiwuying

Website
- Official website

National Kaohsiung Center for the Arts, also known as Weiwuying, (traditional Chinese: 衛武營國家藝術文化中心; simplified Chinese: 卫武营国家艺术文化中心; pinyin: Wèiwǔyíng Guójiā Yìshù Wénhuà Zhōngxīn), is located in Fengshan District, Kaohsiung, Taiwan. It is the largest cultural facility in Taiwan, the world's largest performing art theater under one roof, and the first national-level performing arts venue in southern Taiwan. The planning, preparation, and construction were overseen by the Weiwuying Arts and Culture Center Preparatory Office and, after completion, it became one of the venues under the National Performing Arts Center.

The main building was designed by Dutch architect Francine Houben and includes four indoor performance halls, which are as follows: an Opera House with 2,236 seats, a Concert Hall with 1,981 seats, a Playhouse with 1,209 seats, and a Recital Hall with 434 seats. On the south side, there is an outdoor theater that connects to the central lawn of the Weiwuying Metropolitan Park, capable of accommodating 30,000 people for outdoor performances. The Concert Hall is equipped with a pipe organ featuring 9,085 pipes, making it the largest pipe organ in Asia. It was constructed by the Klais Orgelbau in Germany. At its opening, the facility was praised by The Guardian as the "biggest arts venue on Earth."

== History ==
Weiwuying Metropolitan Park was once a recruitment base as the Southern part of Taiwan and a deserted military training base during the Qing dynasty and Japanese colonial period. However, the Military Council of Nationalist Kuomintang (KMT) determined that the camp was no longer suitable for military purposes in 1979, which led to the evacuation of the camp. In 2003, the project was initiated by the Executive Yuan in hopes of redeveloping the area with a three-in-one structure consisting of a metropolitan park, an arts center, and a specific business district. The arts center then became part of the new top ten stimulus projects of the country.

The entire Metropolitan Park occupies 66.6 hectares, with the National Kaohsiung Center for the Arts Weiwuying covering 10 hectares of it. On March 15, 2006, the Executive Yuan's Cultural Construction Commission (restructured into the Ministry of Culture in 2012) announced the establishment of the Weiwuying Arts and Culture Center Preparatory Office and initiated the construction planning. In 2007, the design firm Mecanoo Architecten won the rights for the design and construction of the center.

On April 2, 2014, the National Performing Arts Center was officially established. In January 2015, the "Weiwuying Operation Promotion Team" was established to carry out the necessary hardware and software preparations for the official opening of the venue, ensuring a smooth transition to venue operations. The construction project was completed and reported as finished by the end of October 2017.

On September 10, 2018, the Ministry of Culture officially transferred the venue to the National Performing Arts Center, marking the formal establishment of the National Kaohsiung Center for the Arts (Weiwuying).

On October 13, 2018, an inaugural ceremony was held in the form of a concert, marking the official opening of the National Kaohsiung Center for the Arts (Weiwuying).

== Architecture ==
The center was built on 9.9 hectares of land and with a total floor area of 3.3 hectares. Its streamlined, wave-like design with a white, wave-shaped curve integrates with the surrounding environment. Architect Francine Houben incorporated the design of the Weiwuying banyan tree grove, allowing the public to enter the venue from all directions. The roof features a 35,000 square meter curved surface roof, constructed with 4,500 aluminum alloy panels, making it the world's largest comprehensive performance venue under a single roof.

To meet the acoustic requirements of the auditorium, the building structure employs three construction methods simultaneously: reinforced concrete, steel frame, and steel-reinforced concrete. The primary interior walls are steel-skinned curved surfaces, extending from the ground to the ceiling without distinct boundaries. The steel skin project incorporates the traditional shipbuilding craftsmanship of Kaohsiung blending seamlessly with the city’s rich maritime heritage. The curved shapes are built using shipbuilding techniques, reflecting the maritime imagery of Kaohsiung Harbor and the historical shipbuilding industry. A total of 2,320 steel plates were used to create an irregular silver-white cave, covering a total area of 23,000 square meters, equivalent to 55 standard basketball courts. Inside the venue building, four performance halls and an outdoor theater are interconnected by Banyan Plaza.

In December 2017, it received the 2017 Idea-Tops Award for Digital Architecture. In December 2018, it won the 2018 New York Design Awards. In July 2019, it received the 2019 Architizer A+ Awards, including the Annual Honors, Jury Award for Theater Architecture, and Audience Choice Award for Theater Architecture. It was also featured in TIME Magazine's "World's Greatest Places 2019." In 2020, it received the International Architecture Awards 2020.

=== Opera House ===
The Opera House consists of 2236 seats and is mainly used for large-scale performances, such as operas, dances, drama productions, and interdisciplinary performances. The name "Opera" refers to all types of performing arts on stage instead of just opera performances. It is the first house in Taiwan with an installation of a mainframe computer to assist in staging operation. The seat arrangement is in a horseshoe shape, where the ground floor is divided into four areas with short partition walls while the second and third levels feature horizontal lines. The color of the seats is a mixture of red and purple along with Taiwanese flowers.

=== Concert Hall ===
The Concert Hall consists of 1981 seats, featuring a stepped vineyard style that encircles the stage and terraces at different floor heights that surrounds the podium. Acoustic shells are hung above the stage that can be lowered or raised with three pre-set positions at 9, 14, and 17.8 meters, depending on the musical performances and the band sizes. The height and angle of the acoustic shells can be adjusted for quality sound control. Within the Concert Hall, the pipe organ is produced by the century-old German manufacturer Johannes Klais Orgelbau. It is considered the largest pipe organ in Taiwan, with 9,085 pipes, including the symphonic and echo organ.

=== Playhouse ===
The Playhouse is mainly for various drama and dance performances. The stage can be configured into a proscenium with an orchestra pit elevator that holds 1,209 seats or a thrust stage accommodating 1,067 Mecanoo Blue seats.

A Dutch theater consulting firm delivers its overall design while an Austrian firm, Waagner-Biro, constructs, manufactures, and installs it. With computer assistance, there are eight sets of elevating platforms and removable seats that allows the stage to be set to a thrust stage, seating area, or partial seating area with an orchestra pit.

=== Recital Hall ===
The Recital Hall consists of 434 seats with golden fabric and oak lines, which is mainly for chamber music, recitals, or smaller performances based on its asymmetrical composition. The design is a variation of the traditional shoebox style, where there is a lower wall separating the center of the seating area. The upper half of the Recital Hall is surrounded by an entire circle of sound-absorbing drapery that is behind the perforated wooden panels. The sound-absorption can be adjusted accordingly to meet the needs of various types of performances while the size of the drapery is depended on the performance genres.

== Awards ==
- Idea-Tops Award, 2017
- New York Design Awards, 2018
- Architizer A+ Awards, 2019
- International Architecture Awards, 2020

== Transportation ==
The art center is accessible from Weiwuying Station of Kaohsiung MRT.

== Gallery ==
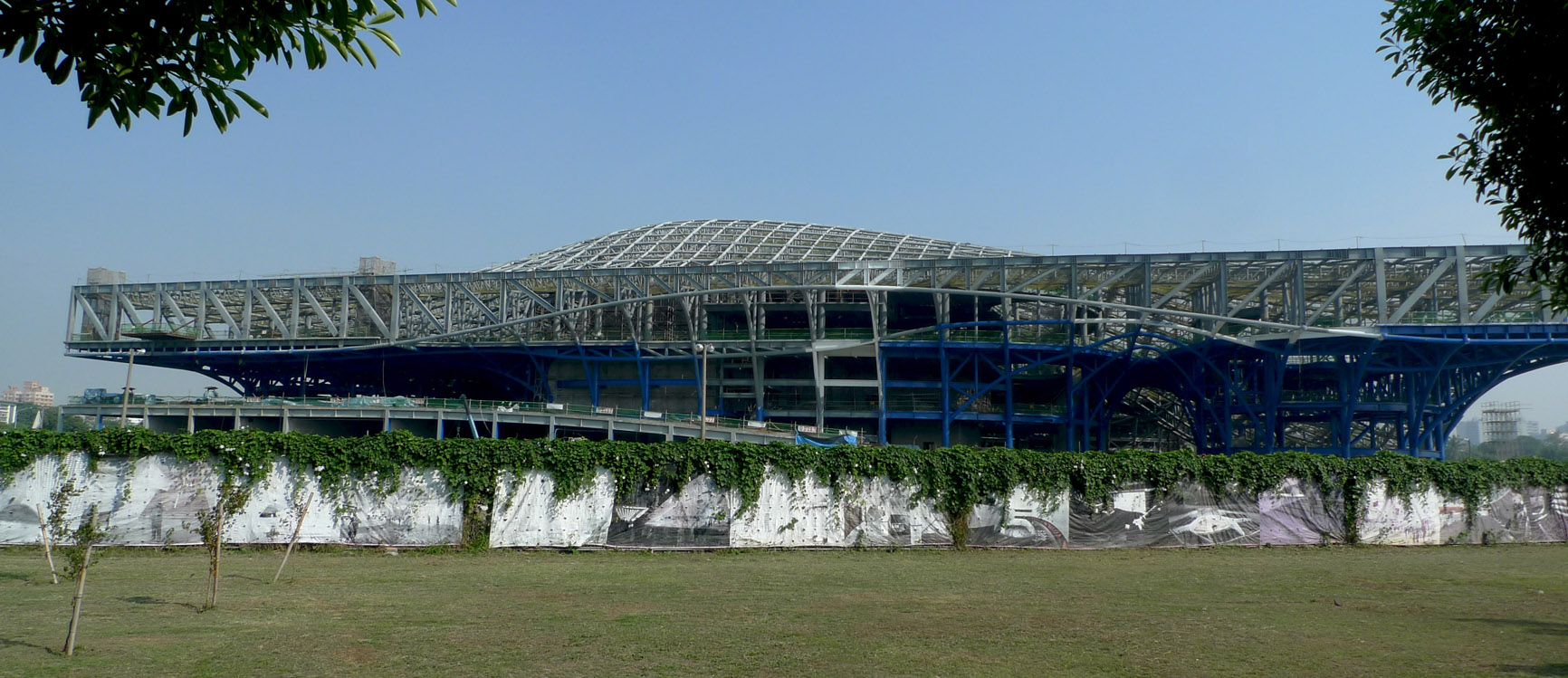
Under construction

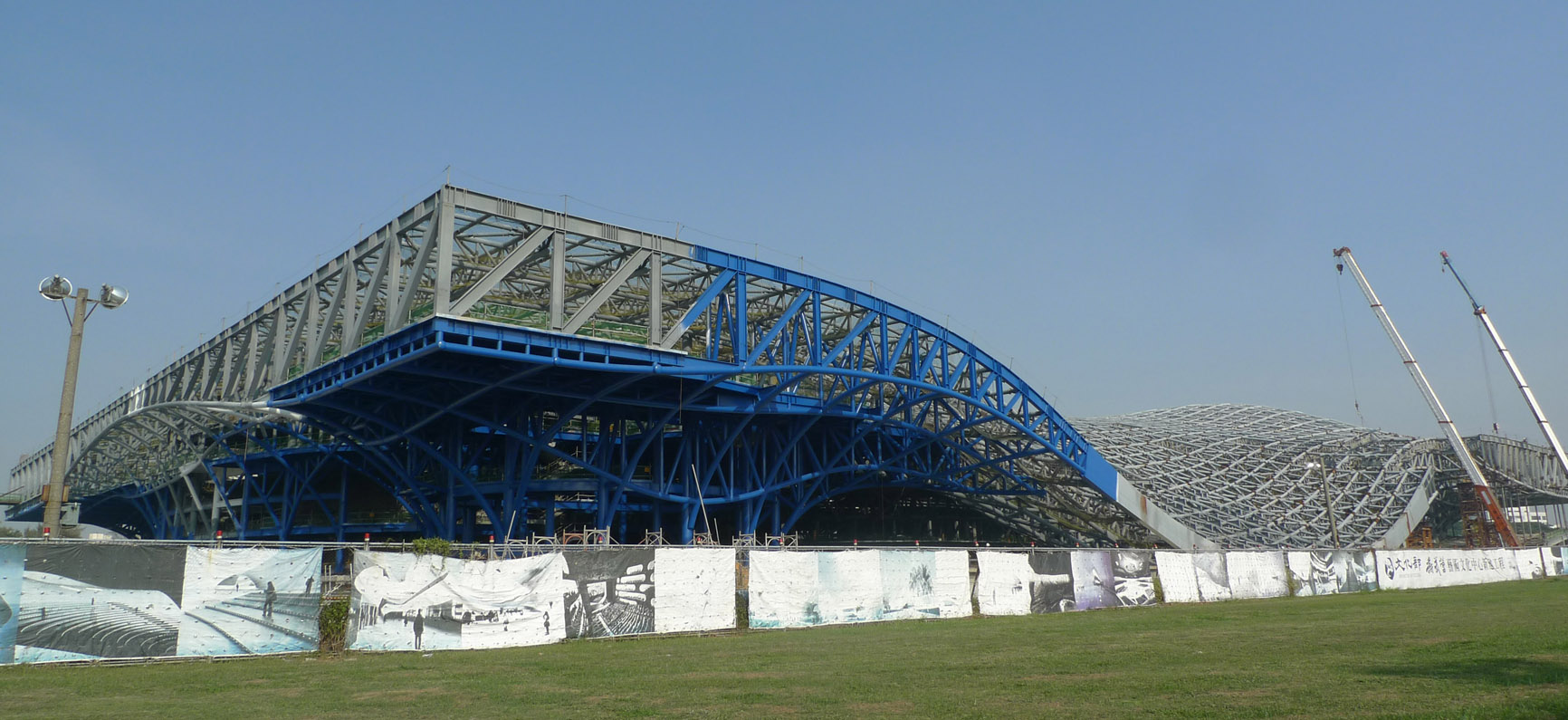
Under construction

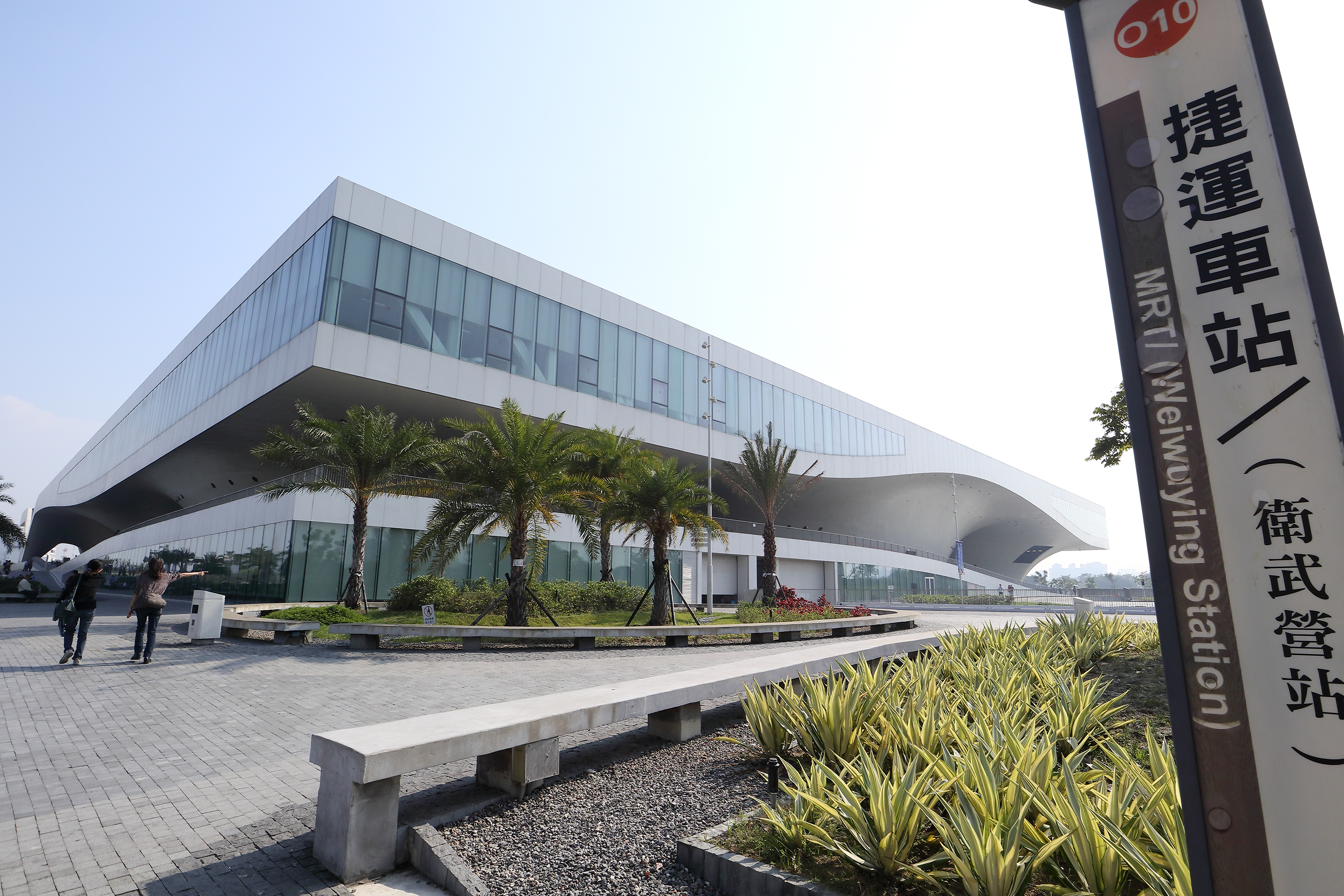
View from MRT station

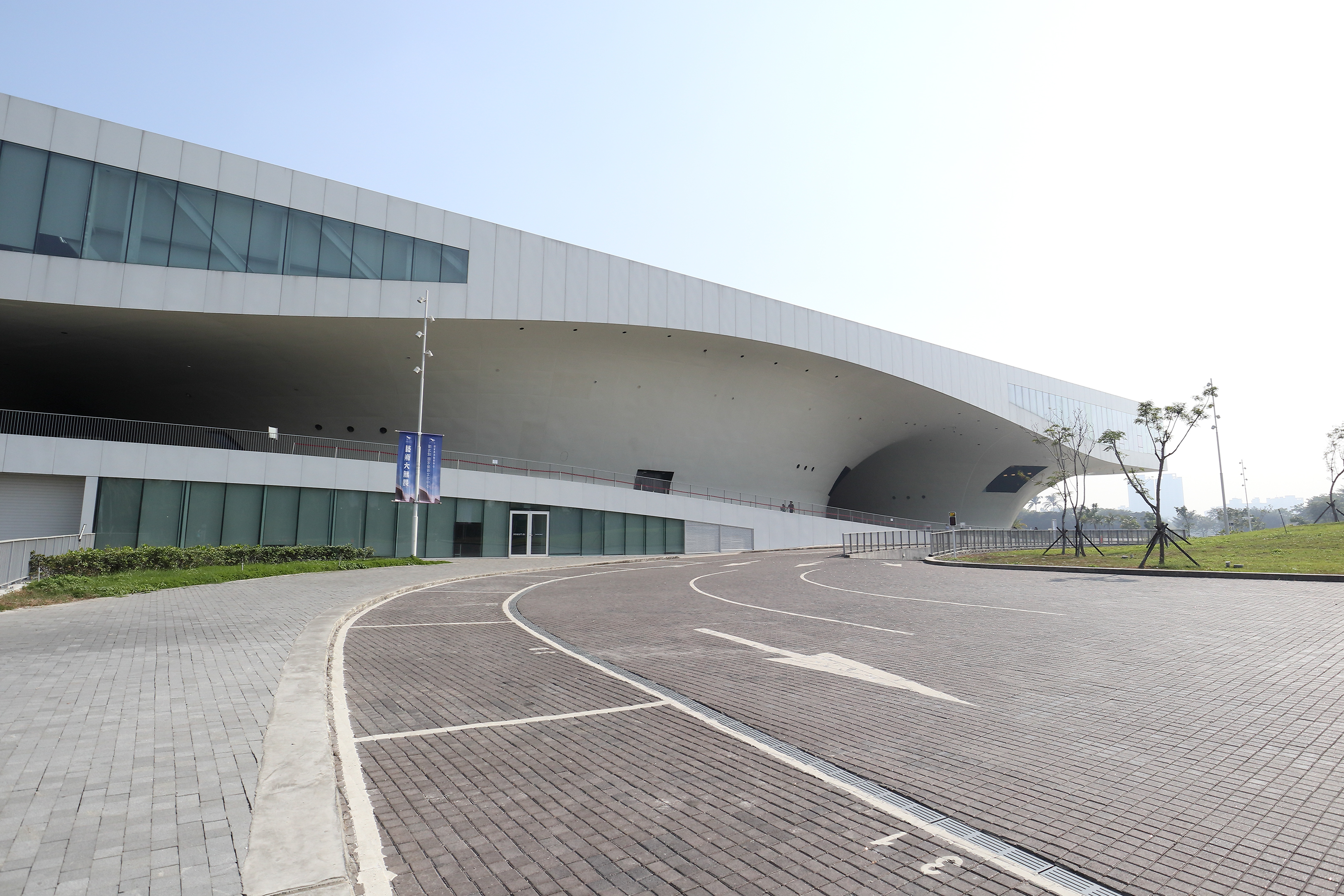
View from parking lot

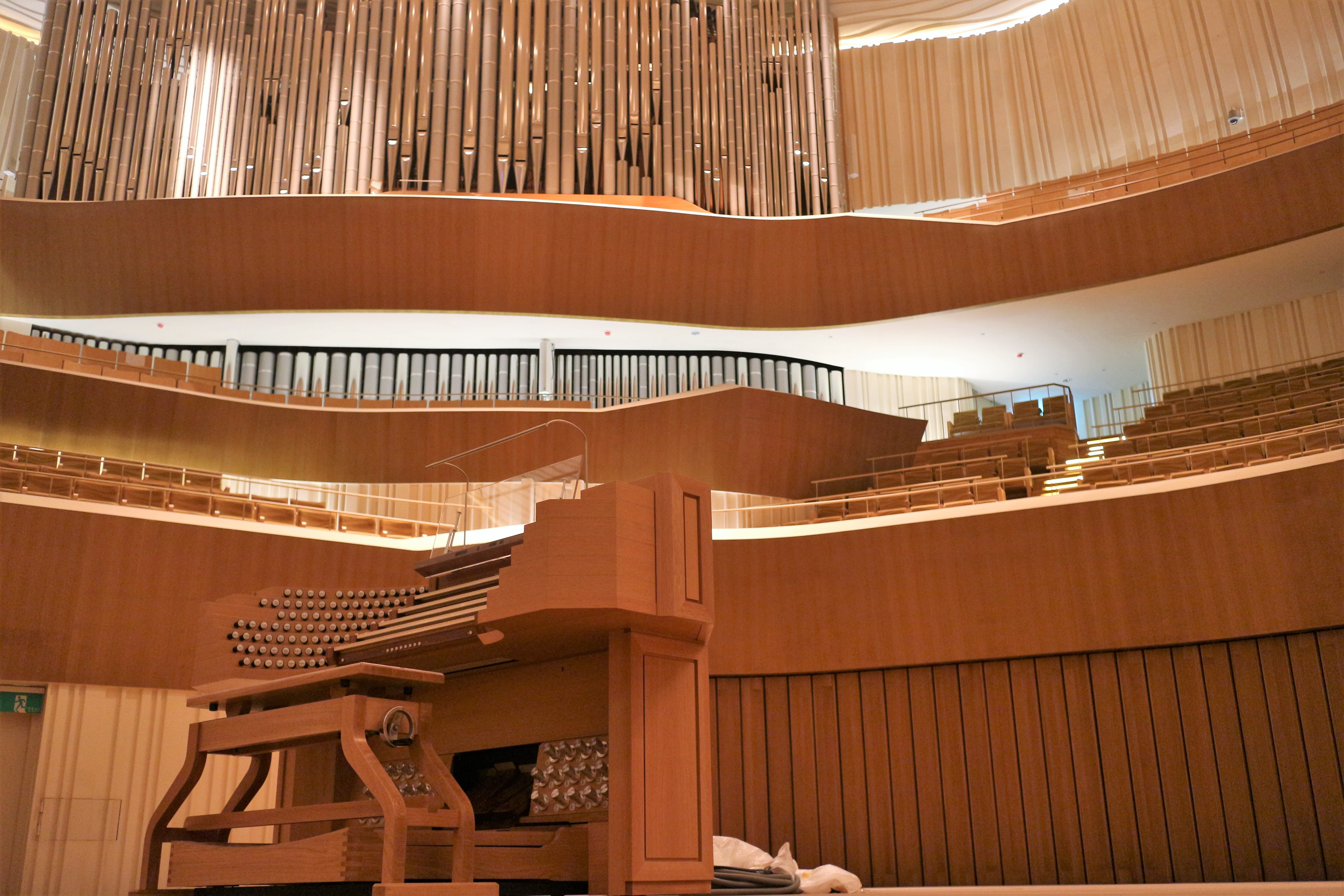
Pipe Organ

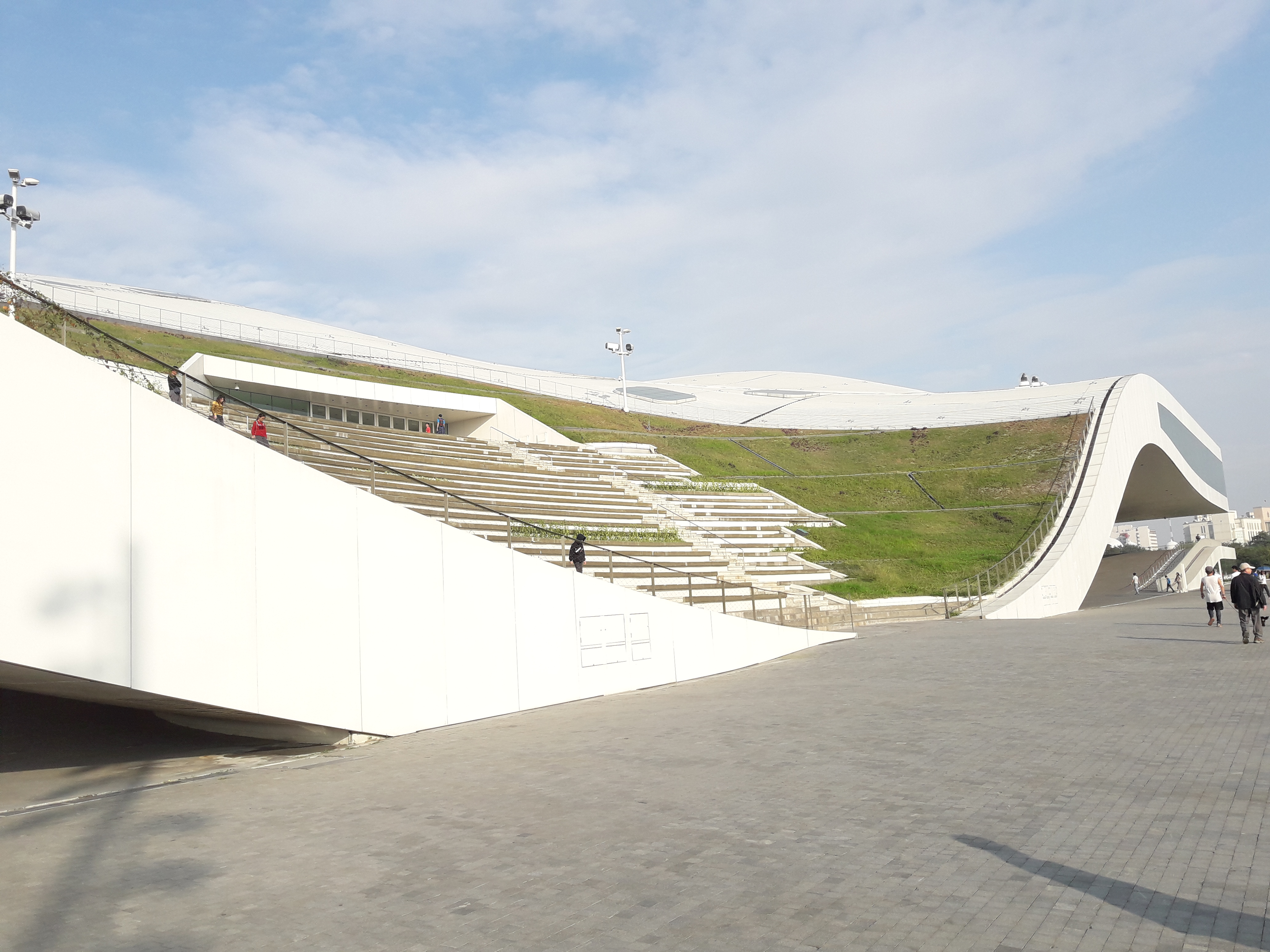
Outdoor Theater

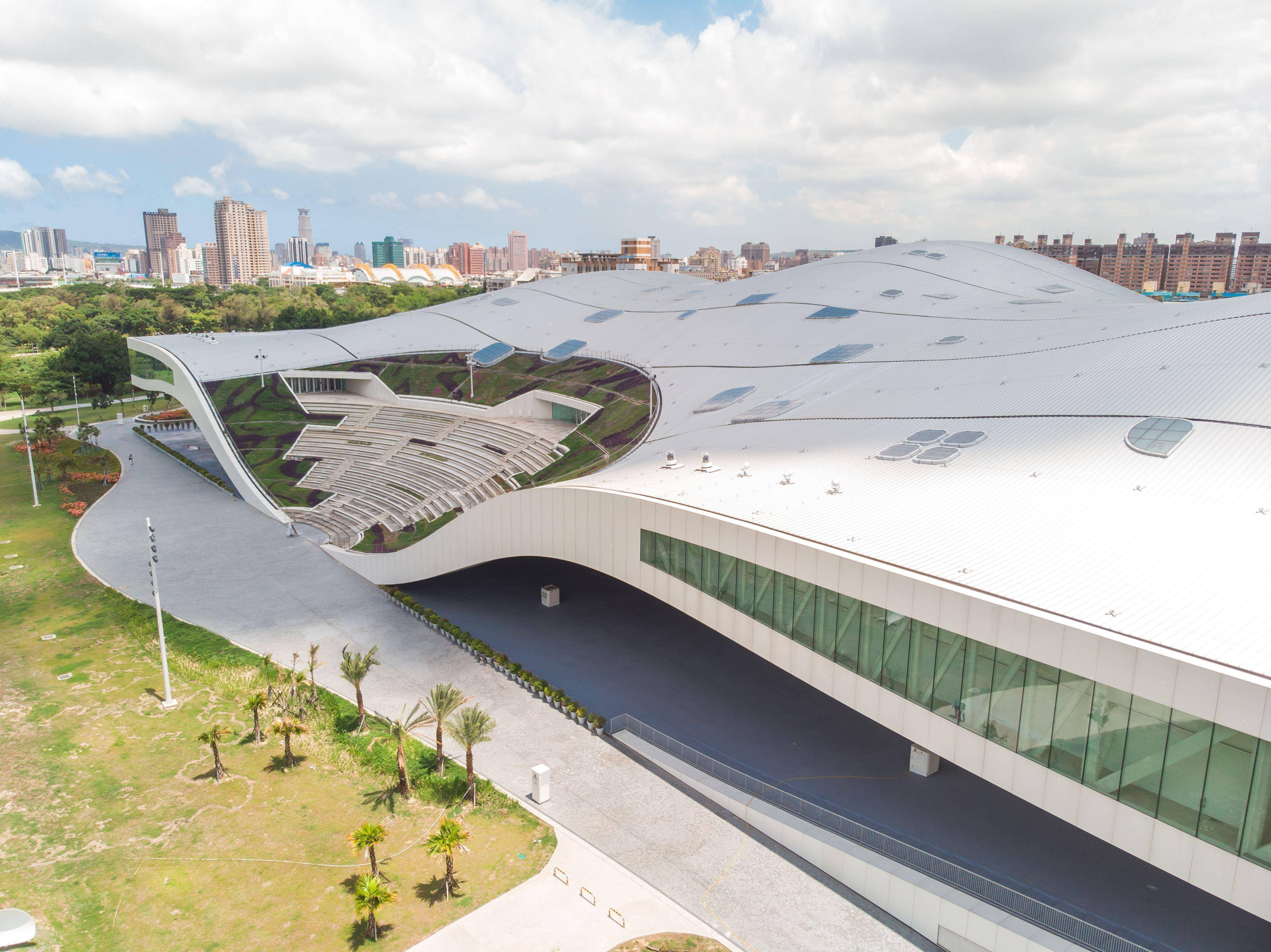
Outdoor Theater

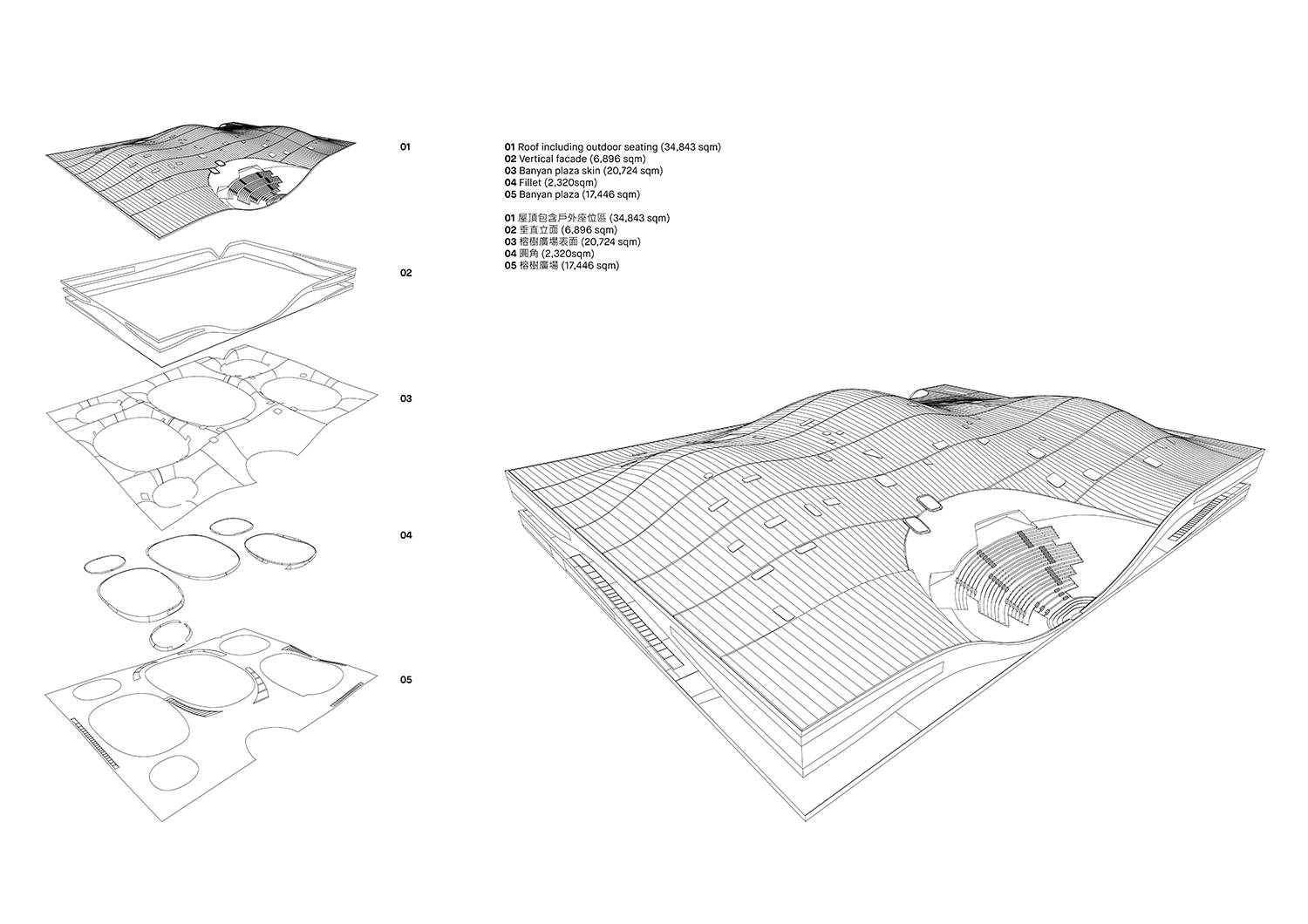
Building schematic

Exterior walkthrough

== See also ==
- National Theater and Concert Hall
- National Taichung Theater
- List of tourist attractions in Taiwan
- Taiwanese art
- Kaohsiung Music Center
