= Taiwan Traditional Theatre Center =

Theater in Shilin, Taipei, Taiwan

- 臺灣戲曲中心
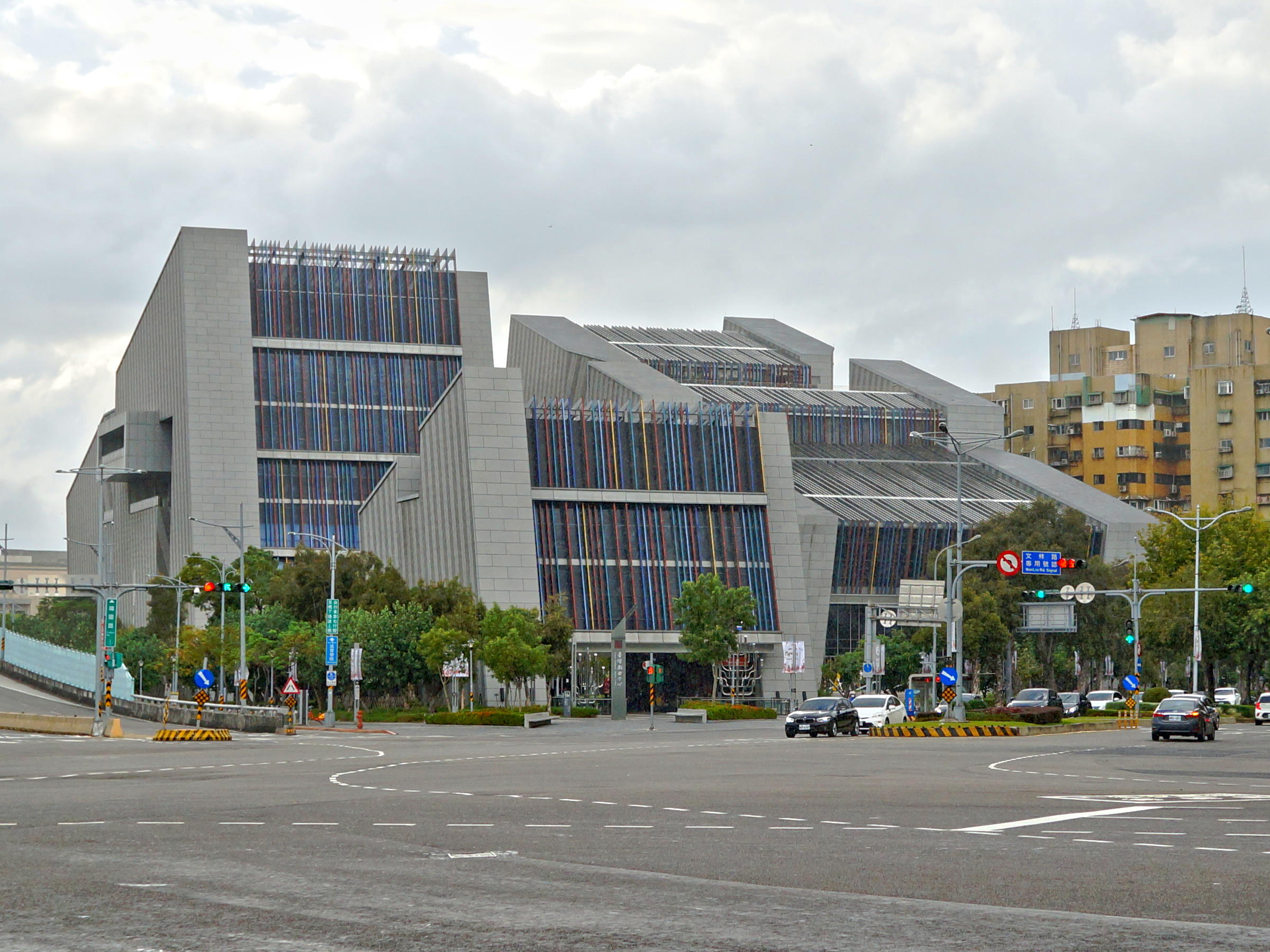
- Interactive map of Taiwan Traditional Theatre Center
- Location: Shilin, Taipei, Taiwan
- Coordinates: 25°6′9.1″N 121°31′10.1″E
- Owner: National Center for Traditional Arts
- Type: performance center
- Public transit: Zhishan Station

Construction
- Built: 2015
- Opened: 2016

Website
- Official website

The Taiwan Traditional Theatre Center (TTTC; traditional Chinese: 臺灣戲曲中心; simplified Chinese: 台湾戏曲中心; pinyin: Táiwān Xìqǔ Zhōngxīn), also known as the Xiqu Center of Taiwan, is a performance center in Shilin District, Taipei, Taiwan.

== History ==
The topping out of the center construction happened on 22 July 2014. The center was completed in mid-2015 and officially opened in 2016.

== Architecture ==
The center consists of the main theater, experimental theater, plaza, terrace, and Taiwan Music Institute, spreading across an area of 1.76 hectares with the shape of 'one table, two chairs'.

== Transportation ==
The center is accessible within walking distance west of Zhishan Station of the Taipei Metro.

== See also ==
- List of tourist attractions in Taiwan
