= Kaohsiung Confucius Temple =

Temple in Zuoying, Kaohsiung, Taiwan

Kaohsiung City Temple of Confucius
- 高雄市左營孔子廟
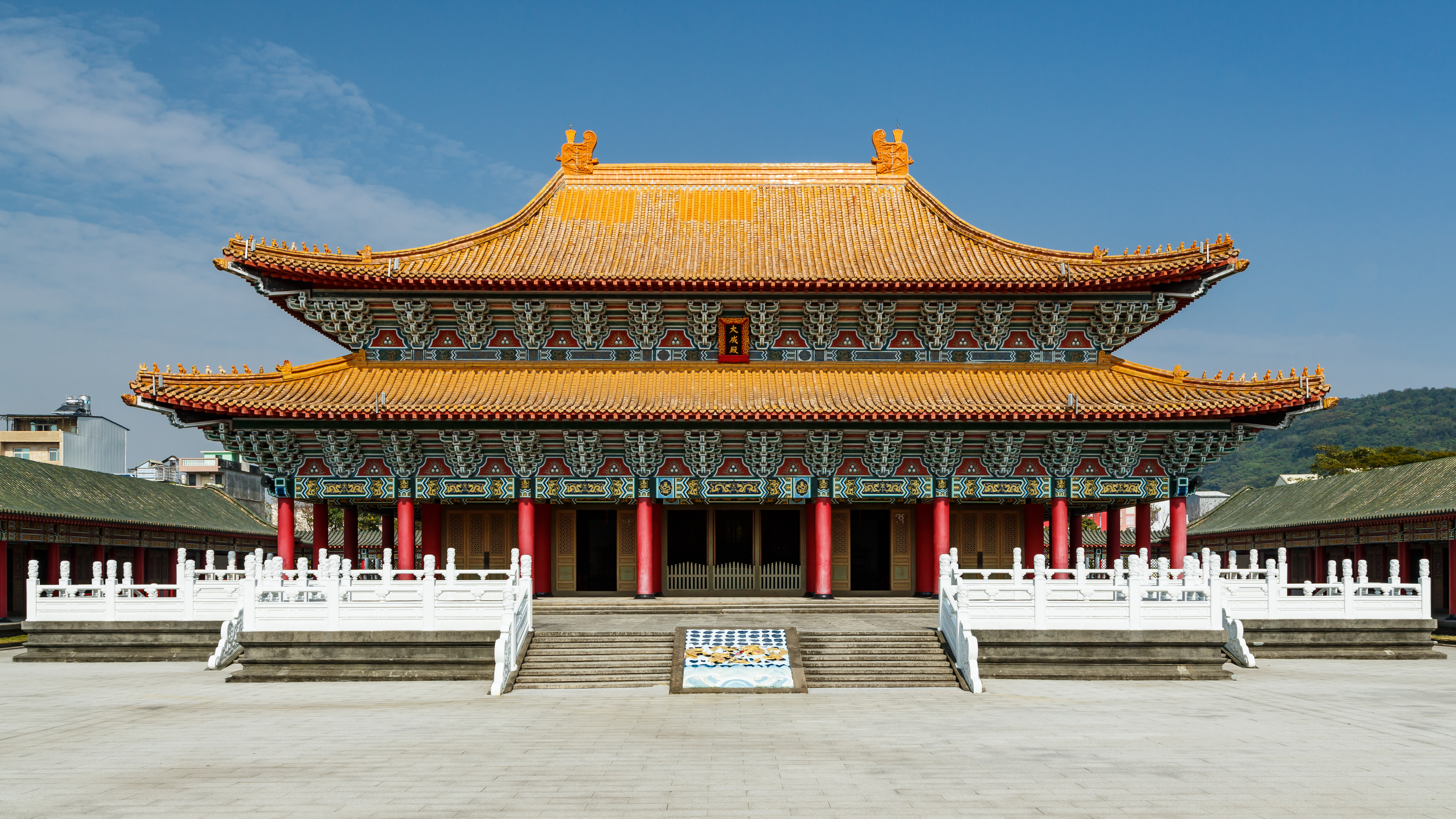
- The Dacheng Hall at the Kaohsiung City Temple of Confucius

- Taiwan

Religion
- Affiliation: Confucianism

Location
- Location: Zuoying, Kaohsiung, Taiwan
- Coordinates: 22°41′21.5″N 120°17′56.5″E

Architecture
- Type: Temple of Confucius
- Completed: 1684 (original building); 1976 (current building)
- Site area: 167 m^{2} (1,800 sq ft)

Map

The Kaohsiung City Temple of Confucius (Chinese: 高雄市左營孔子廟; pinyin: Gāoxióng Kǒngzǐ Miào) is a temple dedicated to the memory of Confucius near Lotus Pond, Zuoying District, in the Taiwanese city of Kaohsiung. With an area of 167 square metres (1,800 square feet), it is Taiwan's largest Confucian temple complex.

== History ==
The temple was originally constructed in 1684, during the reign of the Kangxi Emperor. However, during the Japanese colonial period, the temple fell into disuse and disrepair. Only the Chongsheng shrine remains intact; it can be seen on the west side of the Old City Elementary School.

A new temple was constructed in 1976, now on the northwest corner of Lotus Pond. The new design was based on Song dynasty architecture, as well as the design of the Temple of Confucius, Qufu.

Like the Confucius Temples in Taipei and Tainan, Confucian ritual music is performed periodically at the Kaohsiung Confucius Temple.

== See also ==
- Cide Temple
- Chi Ming Palace
- Zuoying Ciji Temple
- Zhouzi Qingshui Temple
- Spring and Autumn Pavilions
- List of temples in Taiwan
- List of tourist attractions in Taiwan
