= Dragon and Tiger Pagodas =

Temple in Zuoying, Kaohsiung, Taiwan

Coordinates: 22°40′50″N 120°17′33″E

- 龍虎塔
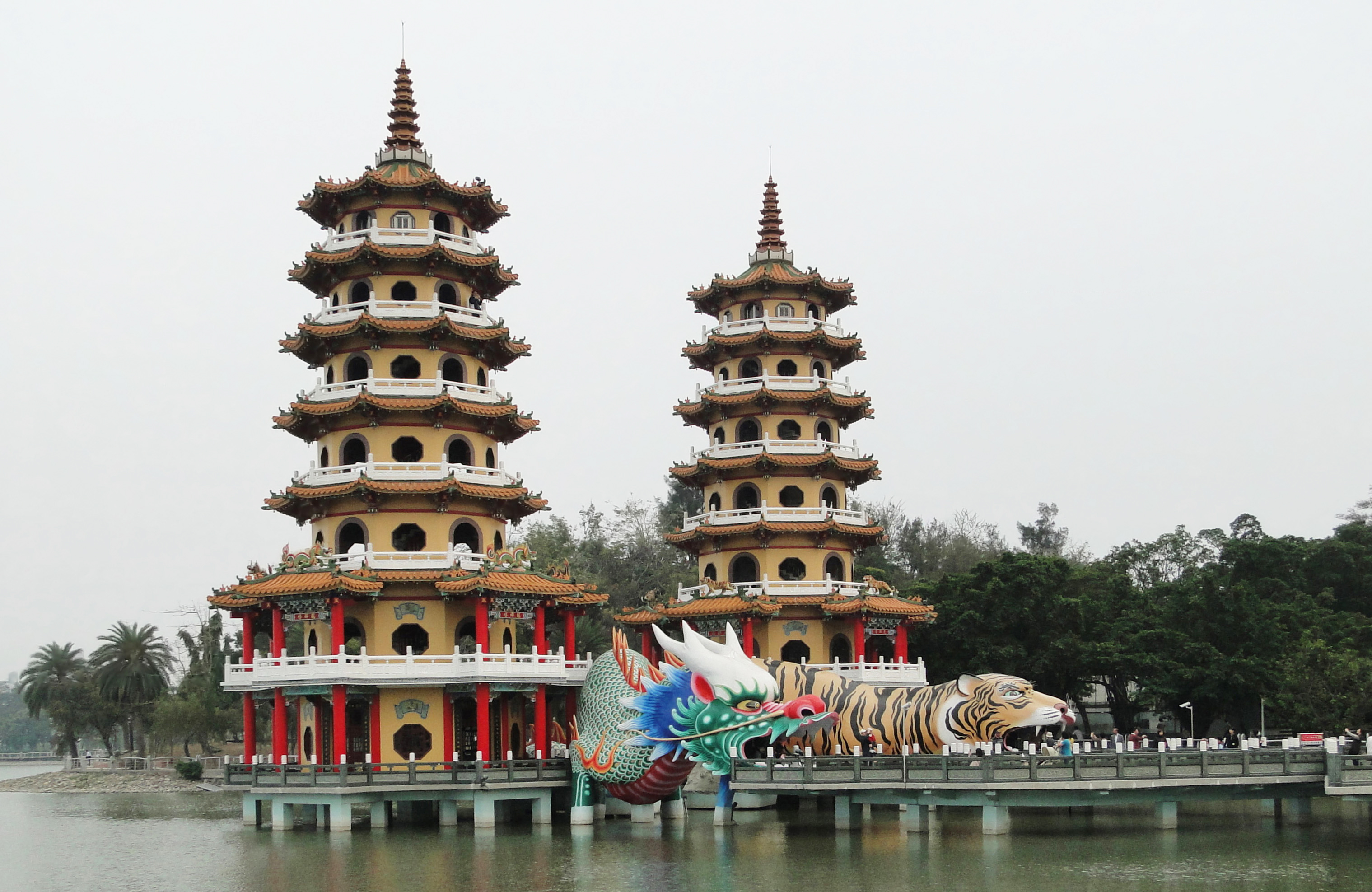

Location
- Location: Zuoying, Kaohsiung, Taiwan
- Interactive map of Dragon and Tiger Pagodas

Architecture
- Type: Temple
- Completed: 1976

The Dragon and Tiger Pagodas (Chinese: 龍虎塔; pinyin: Lónghǔ Tǎ) is a temple located at Lotus Lake in Zuoying District, Kaohsiung, Taiwan. The temple was built in 1976. One of the towers is the Tiger Tower, the other one being the Dragon Tower.

Both towers are seven storeys tall and have yellow walls, red pillars and orange tiles. A zigzag bridge connects the towers to the shore.

There are paintings inside the temple depicting Ksitigarbha. In the Tiger Tower, there are paintings of twelve Magi and the Jade Emperor's thirty palaces as well as paintings of Confucius. The towers have a double spiral staircase, one each for ascending and descending visitors.

Overlooking the towers are the Small Tortoise mountains, Spring and Autumn Pavilions, 5-mile Pavilion and Pei Chi Pavilion, as well as a surrounding lake.

== See also ==
- Cide Temple
- Chi Ming Palace
- Zuoying Ciji Temple
- Zhouzi Qingshui Temple
- Spring and Autumn Pavilions
- List of temples in Taiwan
- List of tourist attractions in Taiwan
