= Qingshui Temple =

Qingshui Temple may refer to the following temples in Taiwan:

- Bangka Qingshui Temple in Wanhua District, Taipei
- Zhouzi Qingshui Temple in Zuoying District, Kaohsiung
