= Water skiing at the 2009 World Games – Men's wakeboard =

Water skiing - Men's wakeboard at the 2009 World Games
- Venue: Lotus Lake, Kaohsiung, Taiwan
- Dates: 22–25 July 2009
- Competitors: 20 from 15 nations

Medalists
gold medal	(United States) Andrew Adkison
silver medal	(Canada) Kyle Rattray
bronze medal	(Thailand) Padiwat Jaemjan

The men's wakeboard freestyle competition in water skiing at the 2009 World Games took place from 22 to 25 July at the Lotus Pond in Kaohsiung, Taiwan.

== Competition format ==
A total of 20 athletes entered the competition. In preliminary two best athletes qualifies to the next round. Athletes who can't qualify through this stage takes last chance qualifiers, from which the best two athletes qualifies to semifinals. From semifinals three best athletes qualifies to the final.

== Results ==
=== Preliminary ===
Heat 1

Rank	Name	Country	Result	Notes
1	Kim Yong-il	South Korea	72.20	Q
2	Park Sung-jun	South Korea	69.30	Q
3	Shutaro Segawa	Japan	53.90	
4	Paul Hernaez	France	43.90	
5	Lior Sofer	Israel	8.30	

Heat 3

Rank	Name	Country	Result	Notes
1	Kyle Rattray	Canada	69.70	Q
2	Nicholas Davies	Great Britain	69.30	Q
3	Wan Ka Choi	Hong Kong	50.60	
4	Walter Gianini	Italy	49.90	
5	Lin Hao-ting	Chinese Taipei	26.10	

Heat 2

Rank	Name	Country	Result	Notes
1	Cheung Ho Lung	Hong Kong	60.20	Q
2	Zhang Wei	China	55.10	Q
3	Shaun Faccio	South Africa	54.80	
4	Bader Al-Jihayem	Kuwait	47.20	
5	Kan Chun-yu	Chinese Taipei	30.00	

Heat 4

Rank	Name	Country	Result	Notes
1	Andrew Adkison	United States	76.20	Q
2	Quentin Delefortrie	Belgium	65.30	Q
3	Padiwat Jaemjan	Thailand	45.00	
4	Lee Chul-jong	South Korea	38.90	
5	Saleh Al-Duwaisan	Kuwait	11.70	

=== Last Chance Qualifiers ===
Heat 1

Rank	Name	Country	Result	Notes
1	Padiwat Jaemjan	Thailand	79.80	Q
2	Walter Gianini	Italy	62.60	Q
3	Wan Ka Choi	Hong Kong	50.60	
4	Bader Al-Jihayem	Kuwait	26.00	
5	Lin Hao-ting	Chinese Taipei	24.90	
6	Kan Chun-yu	Chinese Taipei	22.80	

Heat 2

Rank	Name	Country	Result	Notes
1	Shaun Faccio	South Africa	79.40	Q
2	Paul Hernaez	France	60.80	Q
3	Shutaro Segawa	Japan	55.50	
4	Lior Sofer	Israel	52.30	
5	Lee Chul-jong	South Korea	33.80	
6	Saleh Al-Duwaisan	Kuwait	19.40	

=== Semifinals ===
Heat 1

Rank	Name	Country	Result	Notes
1	Padiwat Jaemjan	Thailand	74.40	Q
2	Park Sung-jun	South Korea	69.60	Q
3	Kim Yong-il	South Korea	63.30	Q
4	Quentin Delefortrie	Belgium	53.00	
5	Cheung Ho Lung	Hong Kong	48.00	
6	Paul Hernaez	France	24.00	

Heat 2

Rank	Name	Country	Result	Notes
1	Andrew Adkison	United States	82.40	Q
2	Shaun Faccio	South Africa	80.60	Q
3	Kyle Rattray	Canada	74.40	Q
4	Nicholas Davies	Great Britain	50.30	
5	Zhang Wei	China	50.20	
6	Walter Gianini	Italy	39.00	

=== Final ===
Rank	Name	Country	Result
1st place, gold medalist(s)	Andrew Adkison	United States	87.00
2nd place, silver medalist(s)	Kyle Rattray	Canada	68.40
3rd place, bronze medalist(s)	Padiwat Jaemjan	Thailand	64.00
4	Kim Yong-il	South Korea	61.00
5	Park Sung-jun	South Korea	54.00
6	Shaun Faccio	South Africa	30.00
