= Water skiing at the 2009 World Games – Women's barefoot three event =

Waterskiing women's barefoot three event at the 2009 World Games
- Venue: Lotus Lake, Kaohsiung, Taiwan
- Date: 22–26 July 2009
- Competitors: 10 from 9 nations

Medalists
gold medal	(United States) Elaine Heller
silver medal	(Australia) Ashleigh Stebbeings
bronze medal	(United States) Shannon Heller

The women's barefoot three event competition in water skiing at the 2009 World Games took place from 22 to 26 July 2009 at the Lotus Lake in Kaohsiung, Taiwan.

== Competition format ==
A total of 10 athletes (one of them competed only in preliminaries of slalom and tricks) entered the competition. In this competition athletes compete in three events: slalom, tricks and jump. Best 9 athletes from preliminary round qualifies to the final.

== Results ==
=== Preliminary ===
Rank	Athlete	Nation	Slalom	Jump	Trick	Overall	Note
1	Elaine Heller	United States	12.6	14.1m	2200	3000.00	Q
2	Ashleigh Stebbeings	Australia	10.6	13.6m	1600	2533.08	Q
3	Daniele Tipping	Canada	9.2	8.7m	1700	2119.91	Q
4	Emily Goldie	Great Britain	11.0	10.5m	900	2026.79	Q
5	Shannon Heller	United States	9.3	9.9m	1080	1931.14	Q
6	Svenja Hempelmann	Germany	6.5	10.3m	1000	1700.92	Q
7	Alexandra Vigoureaux	France	8.0	7.3m	980	1598.10	Q
8	Tao Jia	China	4.3	10.6m	900	1502.13	Q
9	Stephanie Hamblyn	New Zealand	3.8	8.7m	700	1236.79	Q
	Liao Chun-yi	Chinese Taipei	1.2	DNS	90		

=== Final ===
Rank	Athlete	Nation	Slalom	Jump	Trick	Overall
1st place, gold medalist(s)	Elaine Heller	United States	12.6	18.2m	2250	2844.84
2nd place, silver medalist(s)	Ashleigh Stebbeings	Australia	13.6	13.6m	2450	2747.25
3rd place, bronze medalist(s)	Shannon Heller	United States	10.6	9.9m	1450	1915.21
4	Daniele Tipping	Canada	9.2	8.7m	1800	1889.18
5	Emily Goldie	Great Britain	11.0	10.6m	900	1758.59
6	Svenja Hempelmann	Germany	6.5	10.7m	1200	1555.65
7	Alexandra Vigoureaux	France	8.0	7.3m	980	1389.34
8	Tao Jia	China	4.3	10.6m	900	1265.95
9	Stephanie Hamblyn	New Zealand	3.8	8.7m	700	1043.14
