= Water skiing at the 2009 World Games – Men's three event =

Waterskiing men's three event at the 2009 World Games
- Venue: Lotus Lake, Kaohsiung, Taiwan
- Date: 22–25 July 2009
- Competitors: 12 from 10 nations

Medalists
gold medal	(Chile) Rodrigo Miranda
silver medal	(United States) Storm Selsor
bronze medal	(Slovakia) Martin Bartalský

The men's three event competition in water skiing at the 2009 World Games took place from 22 to 25 July 2009 at the Lotus Lake in Kaohsiung, Taiwan.

== Competition format ==
A total of 12 athletes (two of them competed only in preliminaries of slalom) entered the competition. In this competition athletes compete in three events: slalom, tricks and jump. Best 10 athletes from preliminary round qualifies to the final.

== Results ==
=== Preliminary ===
Rank	Athlete	Nation	Slalom	Jump	Trick	Overall	Note
1	Rodrigo Miranda	Chile	5.00/58/12.00	59.1m	7880	2966.67	Q
2	Martin Bartalský	Slovakia	0.00/58/11.25	55.6m	7040	2790.76	Q
3	Storm Selsor	United States	0.00/58/12.00	55.1m	5860	2426.35	Q
4	Alejandro Lamadrid	Mexico	2.50/58/12.00	47.3m	6690	2386.27	Q
5	Esteban Siegert	Colombia	4.50/58/13.00	54.0m	4890	2221.00	Q
6	Bojan Schipner	Germany	2.50/58/12.00	55.1m	3510	2211.46	Q
7	Nick Böttcher	Germany	3.50/58/13.00	56.3m	2680	1974.66	Q
8	Alex Malenfant-Paradis	Canada	0.50/58/13.00	48.7m	3360	1738.08	Q
9	Kohei Yamaguchi	Japan	5.00/58/18.25	46.0m	2180	1059.16	Q
10	Min Ji-hoon	South Korea	1.00/58/18.25	54.4m	620	974.18	Q
	Reza Mardiansyah	Indonesia	1.00/58/14.25	DNS	DNS		
	Ade Hermana	Indonesia	0.50/58/18.25	DNS	DNS		

=== Final ===
Rank	Athlete	Nation	Slalom	Jump	Trick	Overall
1st place, gold medalist(s)	Rodrigo Miranda	Chile	1.00/58/11.25	57.7m	7880	2939.39
2nd place, silver medalist(s)	Storm Selsor	United States	3.50/58/12.00	56.8m	7270	2728.40
3rd place, bronze medalist(s)	Martin Bartalský	Slovakia	3.00/58/11.25	54.5m	6290	2700.36
4	Esteban Siegert	Colombia	0.50/58/12.00	56.8m	5380	2397.64
5	Alejandro Lamadrid	Mexico	2.50/58/12.00	47.9m	6880	2376.44
6	Bojan Schipner	Germany	1.50/58/11.25	54.5m	3250	2269.13
7	Nick Böttcher	Germany	2.00/58/11.25	51.1m	2720	2113.05
8	Alex Malenfant-Paradis	Canada	5.50/58/13.00	53.3m	3610	2035.68
9	Min Ji-hoon	South Korea	3.50/58/13.00	54.5m	1670	1765.59
10	Kohei Yamaguchi	Japan	1.00/58/18.25	40.0m	1690	703.49
