= Kaohsiung Municipal Tsoying Senior High School =

Senior high school in Zuoying, Kaohsiung, Taiwan

Coordinates: 22.6929°N 120.2963°E

Tsoying Senior High School
- 左營高中
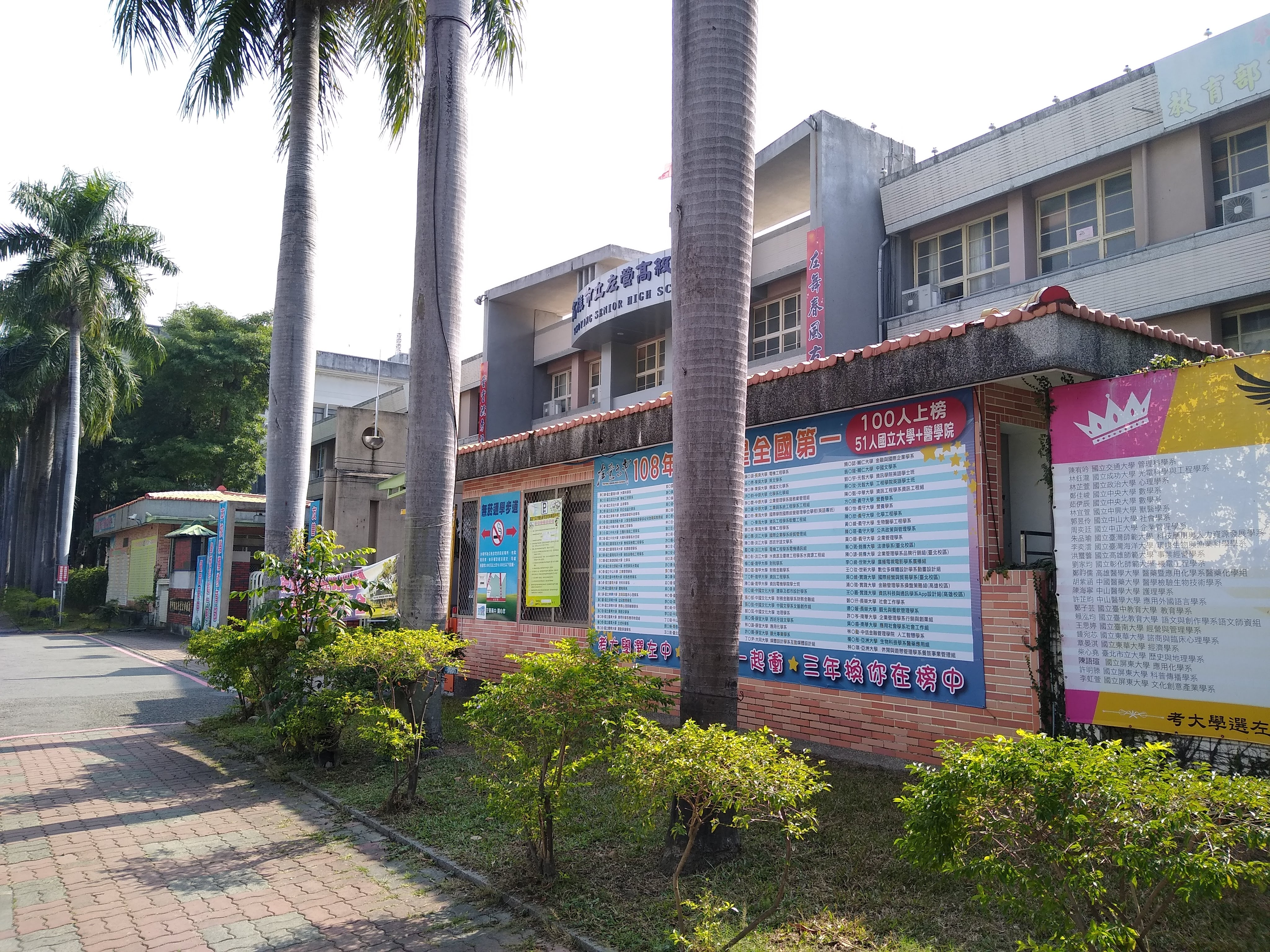
- Zuoying, Kaohsiung, Taiwan

Information
- Other name: TYHS
- Type: Senior high school

Kaohsiung Municipal Tsoying Senior High School
- Traditional Chinese: 高雄市立左營高級中學
- Simplified Chinese: 高雄市立左营高级中学
Transcriptions
Standard Mandarin
- Hanyu Pinyin: Gāoxióngshìlì Zuǒyíng Gāojízhōngxué

Tsoying Senior High School (TYHS; Chinese: 左營高中; pinyin: Zuǒyíng Gāozhōng) is a senior high school in Zuoying District, Kaohsiung, Taiwan.

Lin Hwai-min established the Tsoying Dance Division in 1984. The division has studies for Chinese opera and for Western styles of dance, including ballet and modern dance.
