= Spring and Autumn Pavilions =

Taoist temple complex in Zuoying, Kaohsiung, Taiwan

Coordinates: 22°40′56″N 120°17′34″E

- 春秋閣
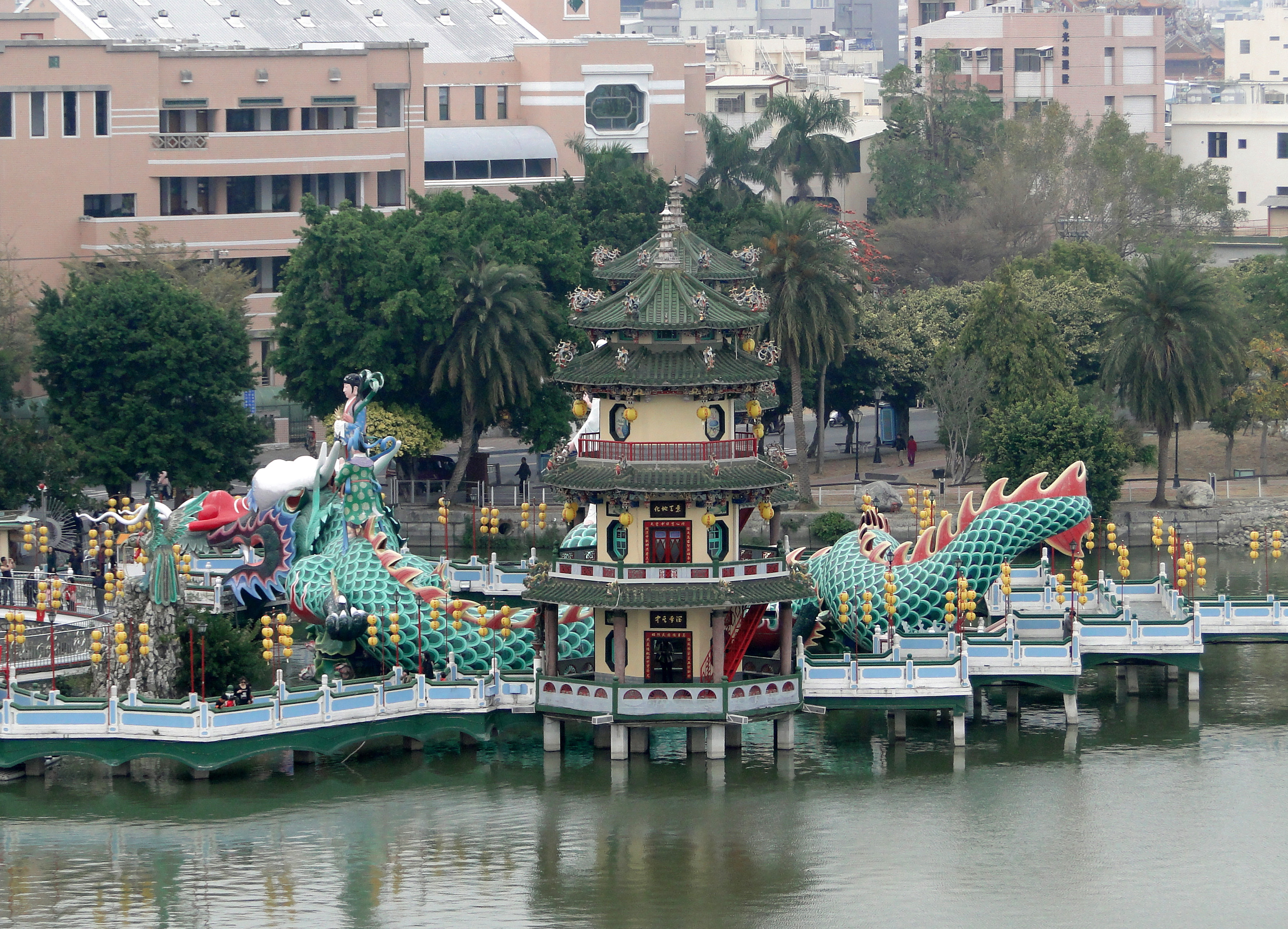

Location
- Location: Zuoying, Kaohsiung, Taiwan
- Interactive map of Spring and Autumn Pavilions

Architecture
- Type: Daoist temple
- Completed: 1953

The Spring and Autumn Pavilions (Chinese: 春秋閣; pinyin: Chūnqiū Gé) are a Taoist temple complex located on Lotus Lake in Zuoying District, Kaohsiung, Taiwan. Like the Dragon and Tiger Pagodas, the temple is special and unique. It was built in 1953 by Chi Ming palace, were two Chinese palace-style pavilions. The complex can be seen from the top of the Dragon and Tiger Pagodas.

== History ==
Spring and Autumn Pavilions, also called "Spring and Autumn Royal Pavilion", got its name from the Spring Pavilion and Autumn Pavilion. It is a landmark that commemorates the martial saint Lord Kuan. It was selected as one of the country's top ten beauty spots. Each of the two towers is four stories high and octagonal in shape. With green tiles and yellow walls, they look like antique pagoda. There are thousands of turtles on a half-moon pond in front of the Spring and Autumn Pavilions. Looking left from the Dragon and Tiger Pagodas, visitors can see the Spring and Autumn Pavilions. Next to the two pavilions is the 5-mile Pavilion, and they are connected to each other by the Nine-Bend Bridge. The bridge's appearance is colorful and bright, and it is a good spot for viewing lotus in the summer. The Spring and Autumn Pavilions is surrounded by water that reflect the pavilions at sunset. There is a statue of Guanyin, the Goddess of Mercy, riding a dragon in front of the Spring and Autumn Pavilions. According to local legends, Guanyin riding a dragon appeared in the clouds and instructed her followers to build a representation of her between the two pavilions; therefore, now there is a statue of Guanyin riding a dragon.

== See also ==
- Cide Temple
- Chi Ming Palace
- Zuoying Ciji Temple
- Zhouzi Qingshui Temple
- List of temples in Taiwan
- List of tourist attractions in Taiwan
