= Fushan Village =

Village in Zuoying, Kaohsiung, Taiwan

Coordinates: 22.686885°N 120.317532°E

Fushan Village in Zuoying District

Fushan Village (Chinese: 福山里; pinyin: Fúshān Lǐ) is a village in Zuoying District, Kaohsiung, Taiwan. This is Taiwan's most populated village with 43,400 people and an area of 1.8 square kilometers. Fushan Village has 65 neighborhoods which is also the nation's highest number of neighborhoods in one village.

Fushan Village has 16,600 households.

The imbalance in population and number of households in some neighborhoods in the city has led to an imbalance in the workload of neighborhood chiefs and the allocation of administrative resources. The city government separated the village into Fushan, Fuhua, Fuai and Furong villages respectively on july 1st, 2026.

== See also ==
- Administrative divisions of the Republic of China
