= Old City of Zuoying =

Walled city in Zuoying District, Kaohsiung, Taiwan

Coordinates: 22.6802°N 120.2901°E

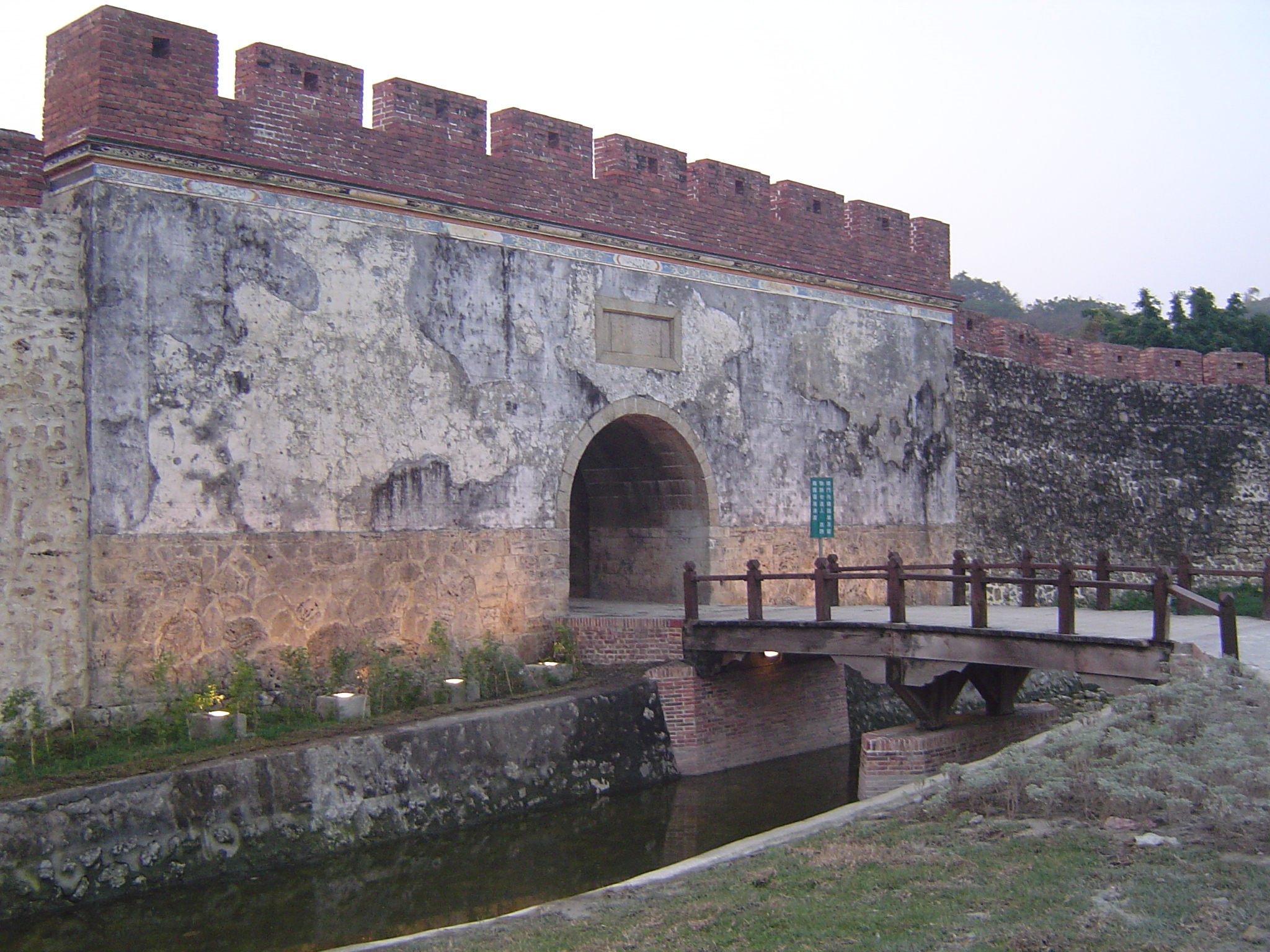
East Gate

The Old City of Zuoying (Chinese: 左營舊城; pinyin: Zuǒyíng Jiùchéng), also known as the Old City of Fongshan County (Chinese: 鳳山縣舊城; pinyin: Fengshan Xiàn Jiùchéng), is a walled city located in Zuoying District, Kaohsiung, Taiwan. It was built during the Qing rule period and is one of the first Taiwanese cities fortified by a defensive wall. The city was administrated under the Fongshan County (鳳山縣) of Taiwan Prefecture.

== History ==
=== Origin ===
Zuoying was a major juncture of the Kaohsiung plain, and therefore possesses strategic advantages. Nearby mountains such as the Turtle Mountain (龜山) and the Snake Mountain (蛇山) created natural barriers, making the place easily defensible. In 1684, Taiwan was annexed by the Qing dynasty, which favored the strategic advantages the place provided. The Qing government set up the Fengshan County seat in Xinglongzhuang (興隆莊) and built government buildings and Confucian Temples, gaining its significance. The early Qing dynasty prohibited the construction of defensive walls in Taiwan to prevent rebellions, so the city never obtained its wall until 1721. In 1721, Chu Yi-kuei led a rebellion in southern Taiwan and captured the county, which had no protection, and ruined many government buildings. After the incident, the Qing permitted building defensive walls in Taiwan. The governor of Tsoying County Liu Kwang-shi (劉光泗) built the first city wall made of mud with a moat system in 1722.

=== Renovation ===
In 1787, the city wall was broken through during the Lin Shuang-wen Rebellion. The wall was destroyed by the rebels. At the time, the local officials thought the walled city was an unlucky place, therefore decided to move the county seat to Pitouchieh (埤頭街; present-day Fongshan District). However, the move of the county seat did not stop invasions. In 1805, Tsai Chien (蔡牽), who claimed to be the "Sea-calming Majestic King" (鎮海威武王), led a rebellion and still broke into the walled city. The government planned to move the city back to Hsinglungchuang in 1807, but it was not financially possible. Until 1824, when Yang Liang-bin led a rebellion and the residents were extremely panicked. As a result, the government collected donations from peasants as well as government officials and put together about 140,000 silver yuans (of which three-fourths were contributed by the civilians). The construction started in 1825 and a whole new stone wall was completely built in 1826. At the time, it was one of the most advanced city wall in Taiwan.

=== Aftermath ===
Soon later, however, it was rumored that the governor died of a disease. The residents thought his death was an unlucky sign and refused to move to the new city. The new walled city was left unused until 1853 when the Qing government ordered the move of the county seat. According to documents, some important government buildings in the city were the administration office (文武衙署), the record office (典史署), and the defense office (守備署); there were temples which worshiped Matsu, Confucius, and Guan Yu.

During the Japanese rule period, the walled city did not change much. As their military policy developed, however, the Japanese Imperial Army made the Zuoying Port (左營港) a naval port. The city was administered as a military district to protect the port. As a result, over fifty households were forced to move out. After World War II, the Kuomintang government still administered the North and East Gates as military district, and set up three villages in the walled city. In 1985, the Ministry of the Interior rated the North, South, and East Gates First-class historic sites. The remaining wall was renovated in March 1991.

== Structure ==
The stone wall was made out of concrete and granite. There were four gates to enter the walled city, the North, South, East, and West Gates.

=== East Gate ===
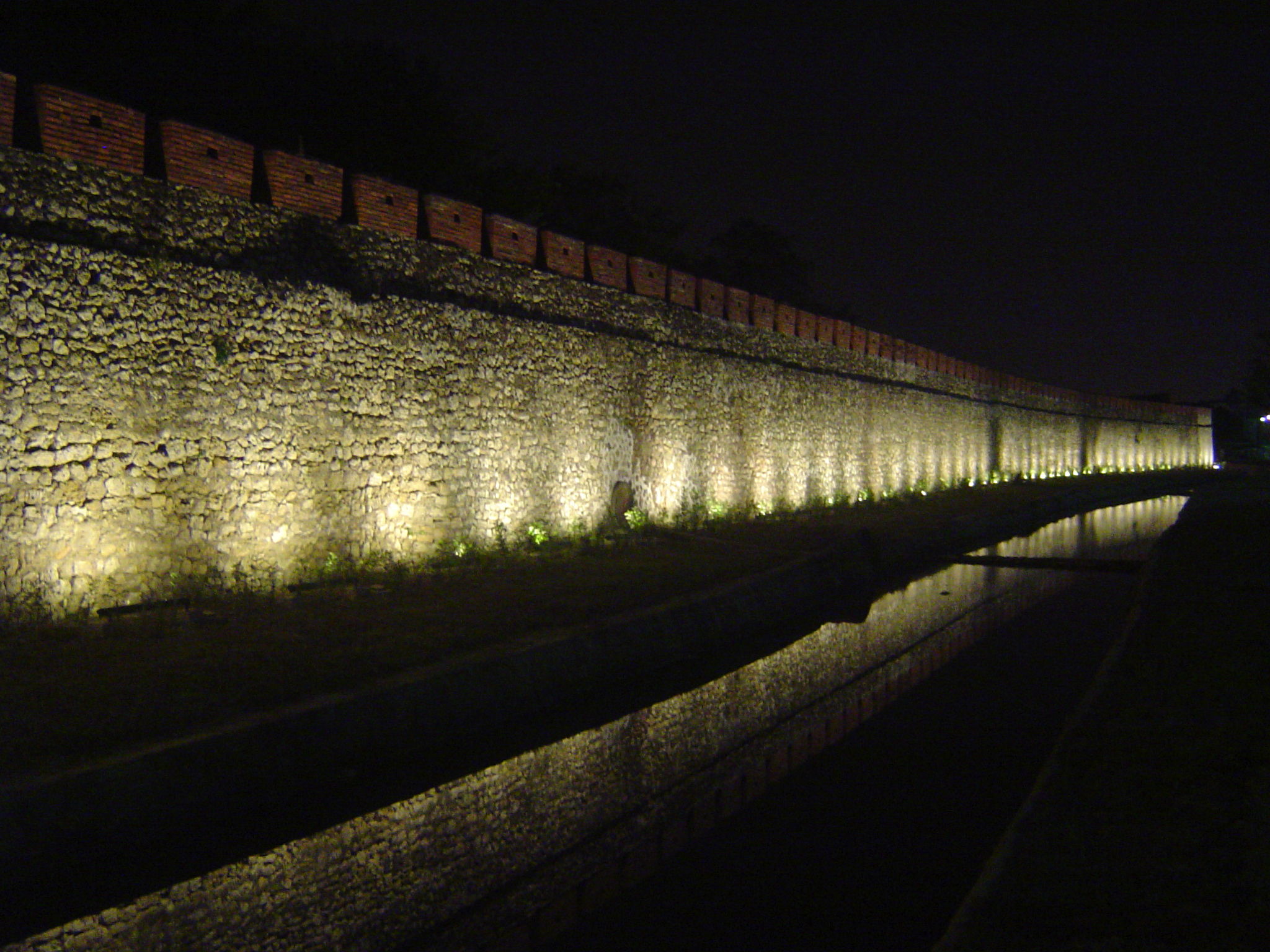
The East Wall at night

The East Gate is also known as the Fongyi Gate (鳳儀門). Of the four gates of the walled city, it is the best preserved. A portion of the wall connected to the East Gate is still present. The gate lacked maintenance during the period when it was part of the military district, which allowed vines to grow on the gate. The gate was renovated after the military camped moved.

=== North Gate ===
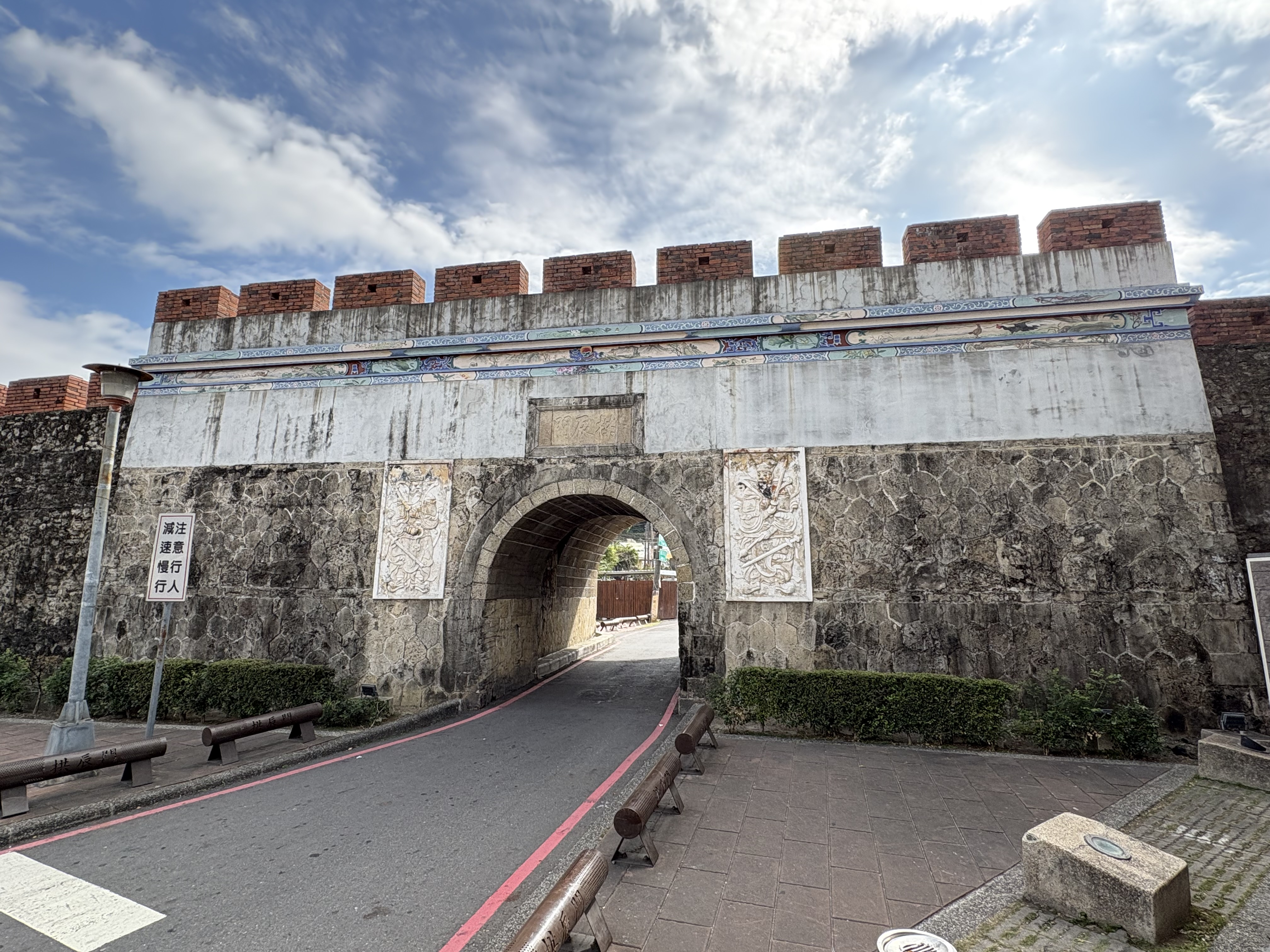
North Gate

The North Gate is also called the Gongchen Gate (拱辰門), and has two inscribed boards on it. The one on the outside says "Gongchen Gate", the one on the inside says "North Gate" (北門). There are two sculptures of door gods on the gate. The names of the door gods are Shenshu (神荼) and Yulü (鬱壘).

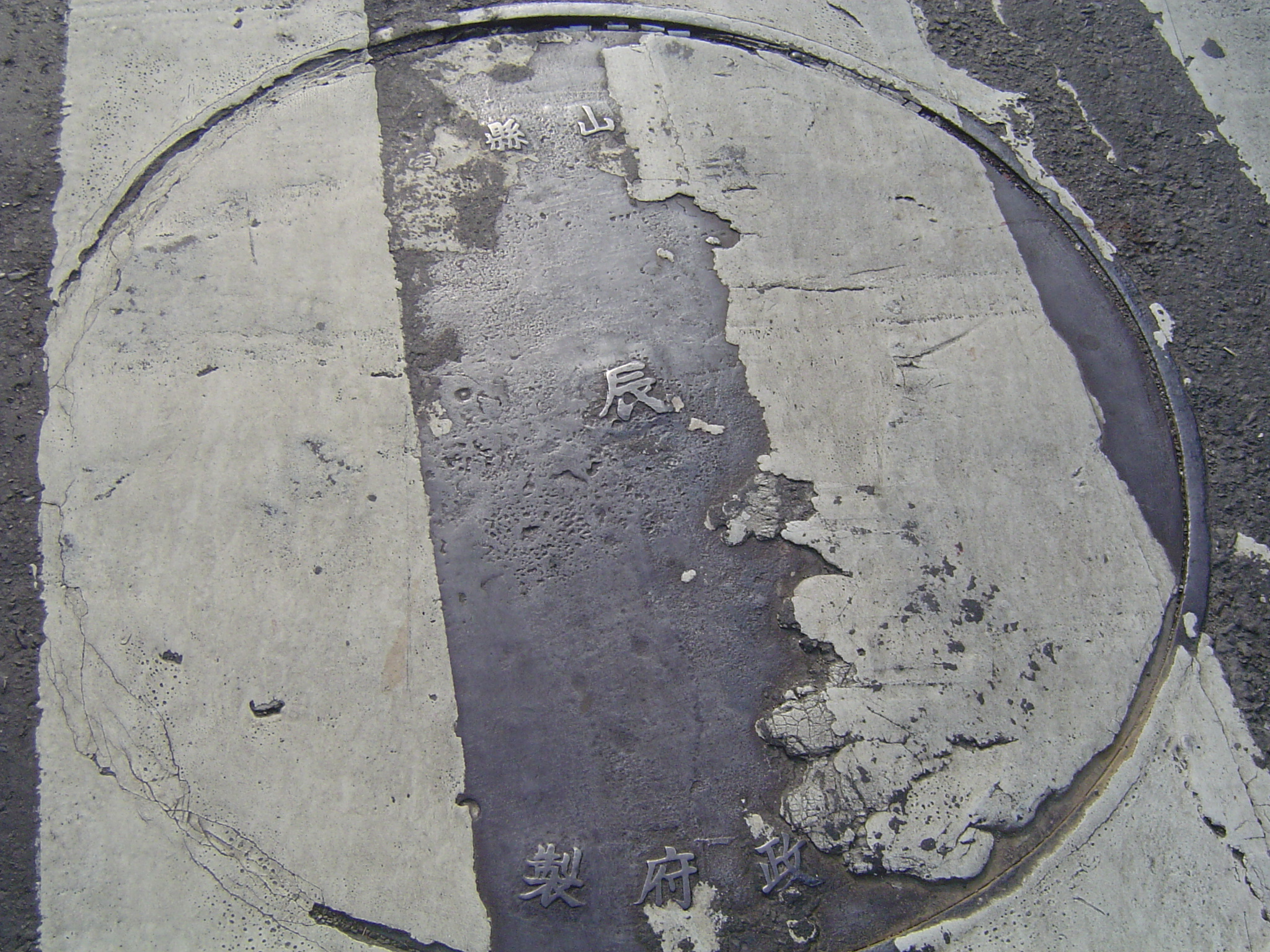
Present-day Gongchen Well

The "Gongchen Well" (拱辰井) was a well near the North Gate built approximately 200 years ago. During Qing rule, local residents relied on this well. The well is no longer functional, and the post-war Republic of China government decided to demolish it. An iron lid was put on the remaining hole instead. Without careful preservation, the lid even has zebra crossing marks on it.

=== South Gate ===
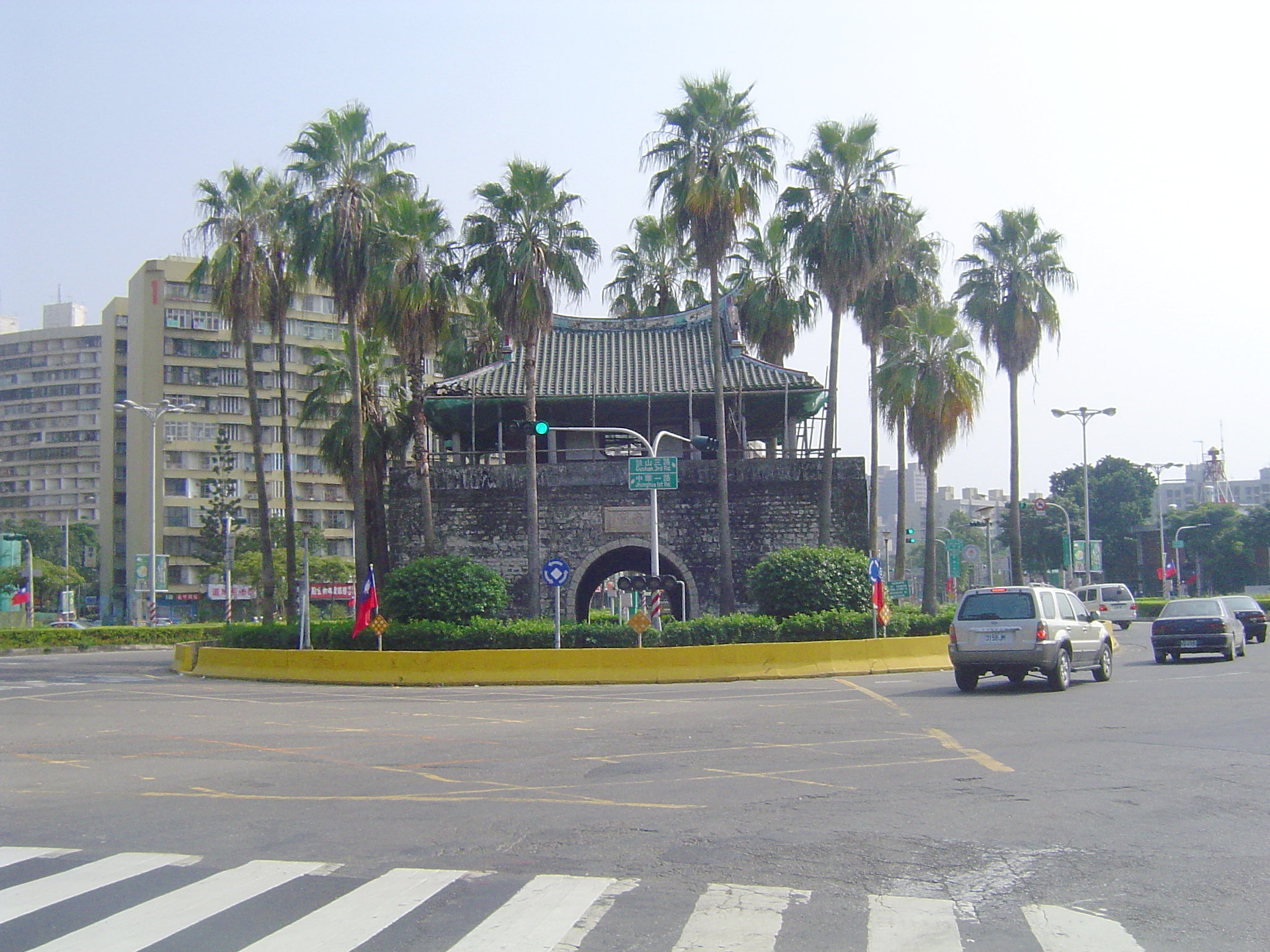
Present-day South Gate

The South Gate is also called the Ciwun Gate (啟文門). The walls connected to it had been removed and now it sits in the center of a traffic circle. Like other gates, the South Gate was built with granite. In the renovation of 1961, reinforced concretes were added to the four corners of the gate, and the stairways leading to the top of the gate was renewed.

=== West Gate ===
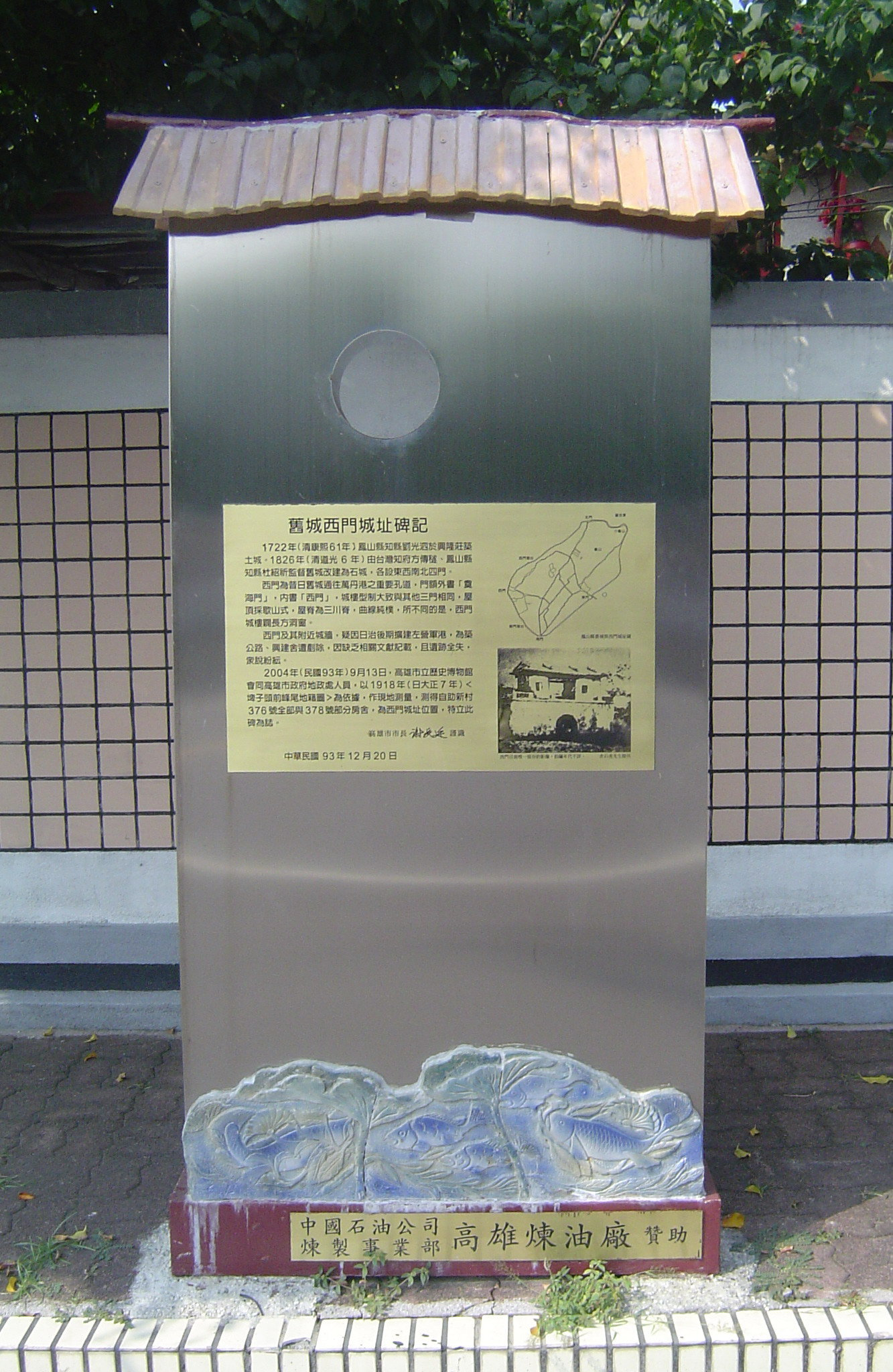
The monument of the West Gate

The West Gate, also known as the Dianhai Gate (奠海門), is no longer present as it was destroyed during the Period of Japanese rule. There was no evidence of the existence of the gate until a Japanese map of the region was found. A monument was unveiled in 2004 by then-mayor of Kaohsiung Frank Hsieh.
