= Zuoying District =

District in Kaohsiung, Taiwan

Zuoying 左營區 Tsoying
- District
- Zuoying District
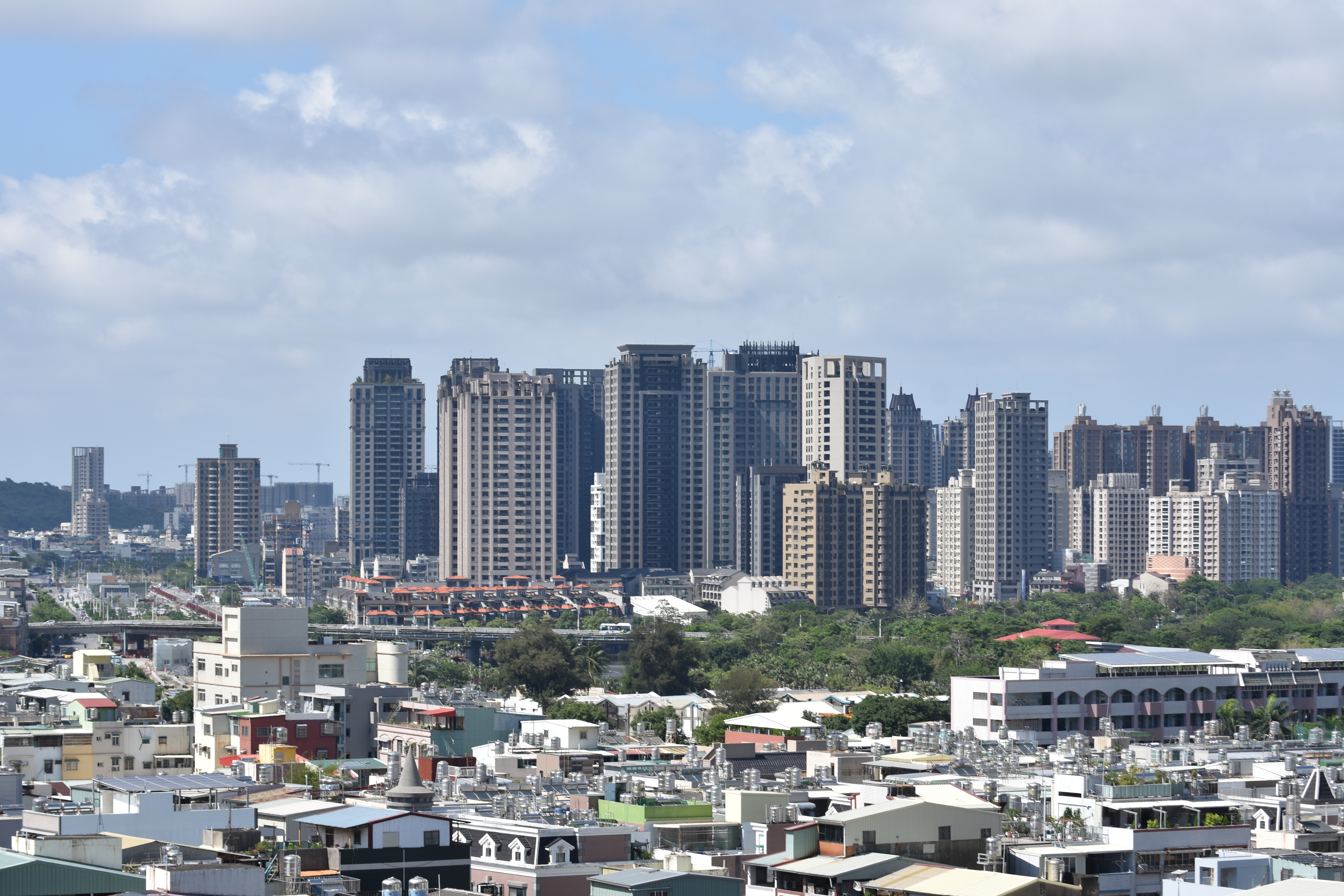
- Zuoying District

- Zuoying District in Kaohsiung City
- Country: Taiwan
- Region: Southern Taiwan

Population (October 2023)
  - Total: 197,026
- Website: kcgtdo.kcg.gov.tw/en/

Zuoying District (Chinese: 左營區; pinyin: Zuǒyíng Qū; Wade–Giles: Tso^{3}-ying^{2} Ch'ü^{1}; Pe̍h-ōe-jī: Chó-iâⁿ-khu) is a district of Kaohsiung City in southern Taiwan. Zuoying District has the most populous village in Taiwan: Fushan Village.

== History ==
Zuoying was established in the mid-seventeenth century as a military fortress, known as Old Fengshan (鳳山, also Old Fongshan). It is now the site of Tsoying Harbour, known formerly as Port Saei (左營港). 'Sa-ei' is the Japanese on'yomi (Chinese reading) of the city's name in Chinese characters, but was romanized as 'Tsoying' after World War II by American Naval Consultants.

In May 1960 a Republic of China Air Force North American F-86 Sabre crashed into a neighborhood in Zuoying killing 11 and injuring 45.

== Geography ==
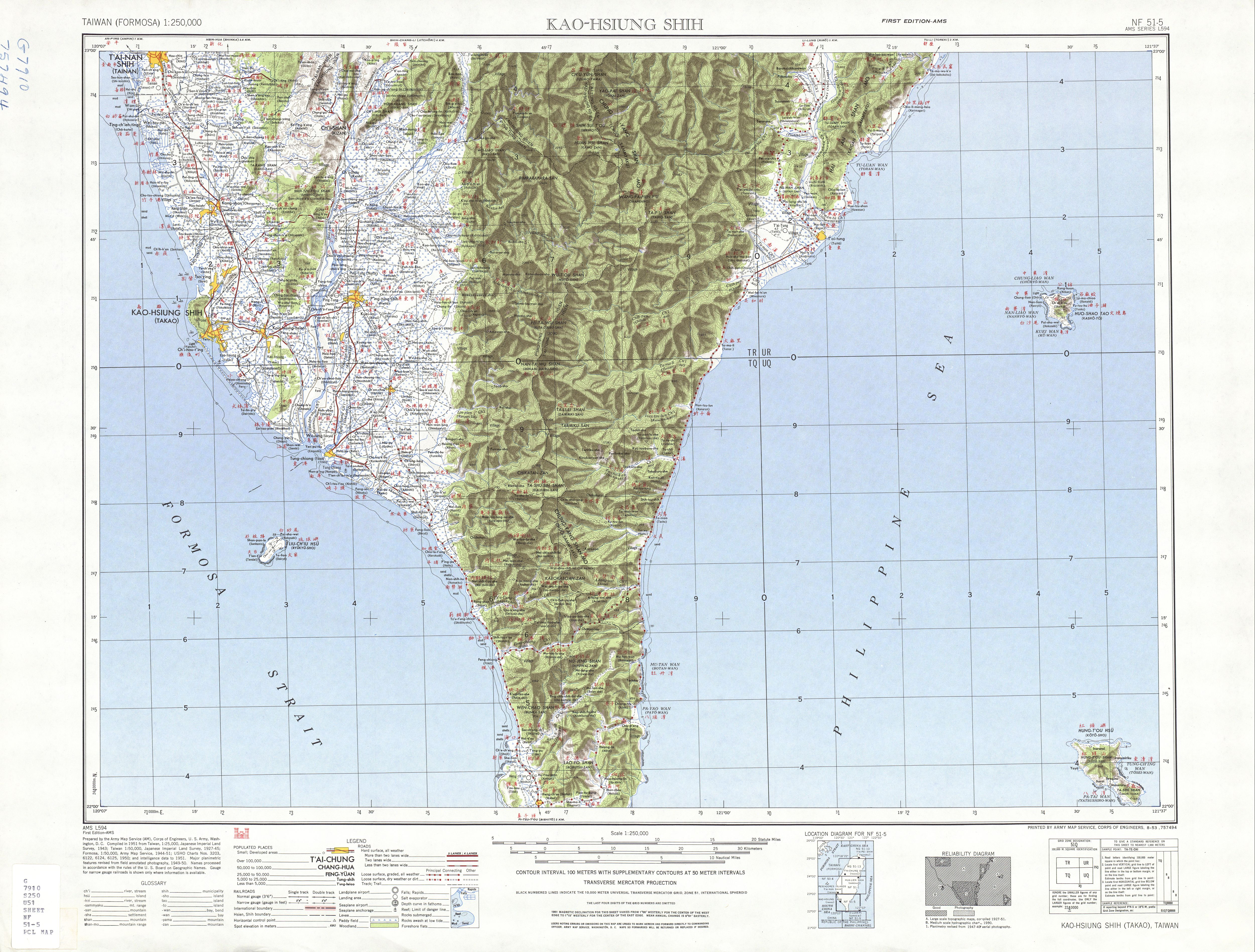
Map of southern Taiwan including Zuoying (labeled as 左營 Tso-ying (Saei)) (AMS, 1951)

Zuoying's Lotus Lake is one of the major tourist attractions of southern Taiwan. This beautiful man-made lake is situated between Gueishan (Turtle Mountain) and Panpingshan (Half-screen Mountain). The Spring and Autumn Pavilions, Dragon and Tiger Pagodas and Confucius Temple dot its shoreline. The Confucius Temple is the largest Confucius temple in Taiwan. The historic gates of the Old Fengshan city wall are also nearby.

There is a mountain called Shoushan or Chaishan (referred to as Monkey Mountain by many English-speakers), with a large population of Formosan macaques and many tropical plants, and part of which lies within the restricted area of the naval base.

- Area: 19.39 square kilometres (7.49 sq mi)
- Population: 197,026 (October 2023)

== Administrative divisions ==
Divisions of Zuoying District

The district consists of Jinxue, Weixi, Dingbei, Zhongbei, Zhongnan, Miaotung, Miaobei, Weinan, Weibei, Bingshan, Xianghe, Yongqing, Juguang, Guanghui, Gequn, Mingjian, Dingxi, Shenghou, Shengxi, Shengnan, Chengnan, Lutung, Bubei, Bunan, Beixi, Beibei, Beitung, Haisheng, Chongshi, Zizhu, Guomao, Guohui, Guofeng, Xinxia, Xinshang, Xinzhong, Xinguang, Caigong and Fushan Village.

== Naval base ==
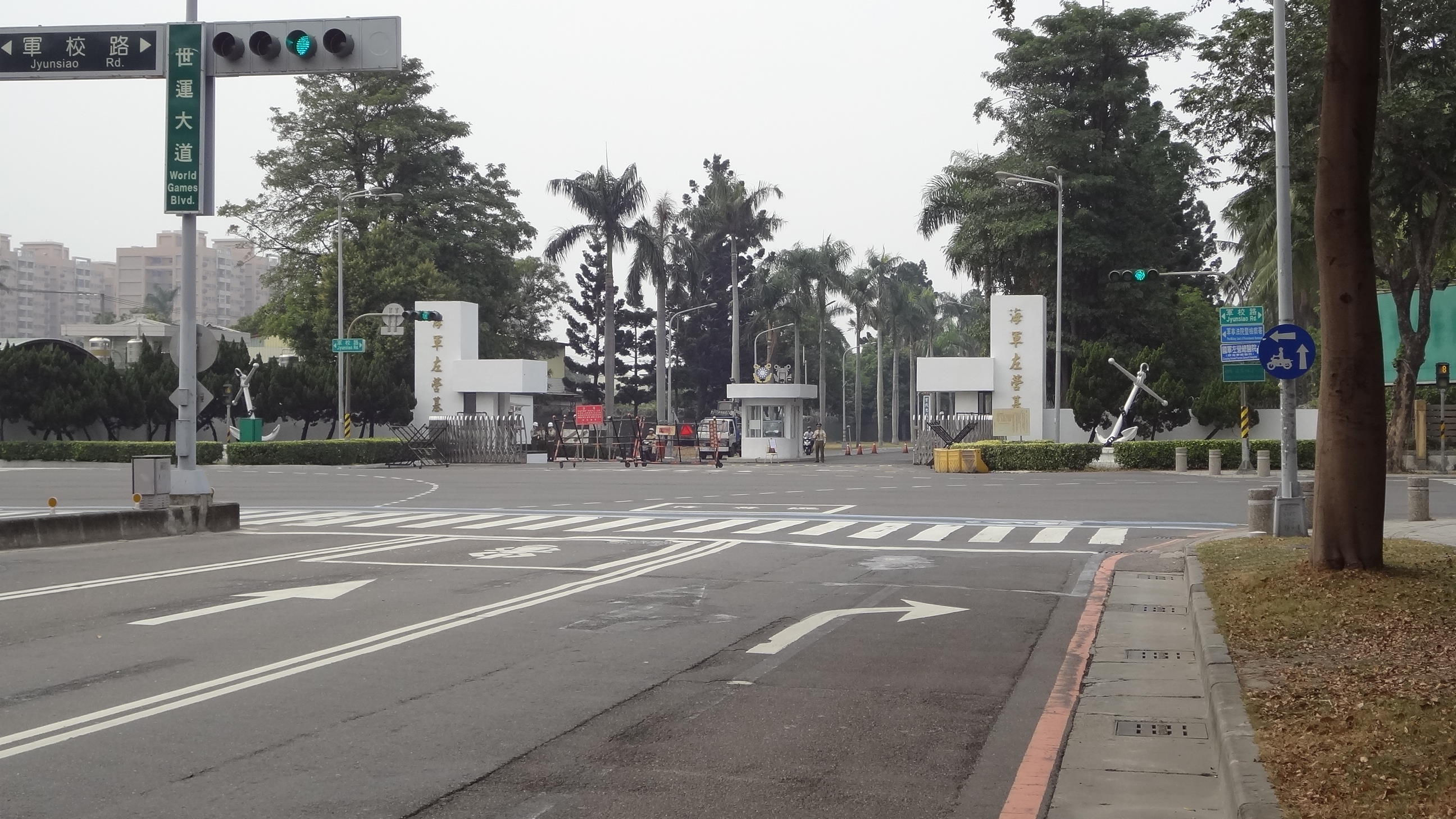
Zuoying Naval Base

Zuoying hosts the Zuoying Naval Airfield (22°42′16″N, 120°16′48″E) and the Republic of China Navy's Zuoying Naval Yard (海軍左營基地), Taiwan's largest naval base. The Republic of China Marine Corps host their training program for their Amphibious Reconnaissance and Patrol Unit (ARP) at that location. A few miles south at the naval camp in Shoushan (壽山營區) is the garrison the ARP's secretive counterterrorism branch; the Chinese Marine Corps Special Service Company (CMC.SSC) (Chinese: 中華民國海軍陸戰隊特勤隊) or more colloquially; The Black (Clothed) Unit (Chinese: 黑衣部隊).

Villages near the naval base are composed of single-story houses, uncommon in most Taiwanese cities. The villages were first populated by soldiers of the Kuomintang who came from different provinces of mainland China and gathered here after losing the Chinese Civil War in 1949. The ROC National Government provided these veteran serviceman with these single-story houses. These residential areas belonged to the navy and were under military control at that time. Therefore, people outside could not enter villages without martial permission. Without interference from outside, the culture of villages embodies that of different provinces of mainland China.

In 2017 the government embarked on a major expansion of the naval base. Under the name Weihai Project (威海), the expansion was given a budget of more than a billion US dollars.

== Education ==
=== Universities ===
- National Tsing Hua University Kaohsiung campus (Opened on February 26, 2026)
- National Yang Ming Chiao Tung University Kaohsiung campus (Opened on July 4, 2025)

=== Military academies ===
- Republic of China Naval Academy

=== Schools ===
- Kaohsiung American School
- Kaohsiung Municipal Tsoying Senior High School

== Tourist attractions ==
- Banping Lake Wetland Park
- Chi Ming Palace
- Cide Palace
- Cih Ji Palace
- Dragon and Tiger Pagodas
- Guomao Community
- Kaohsiung Arena
- Kaohsiung Confucius Temple
- Lotus Pond
- National Sports Training Center
- Old City of Zuoying
- Qing Shui Temple
- Ruifeng Night Market
- Spring and Autumn Pavilions
- Zhouzai Wetland Park

== Transportation ==
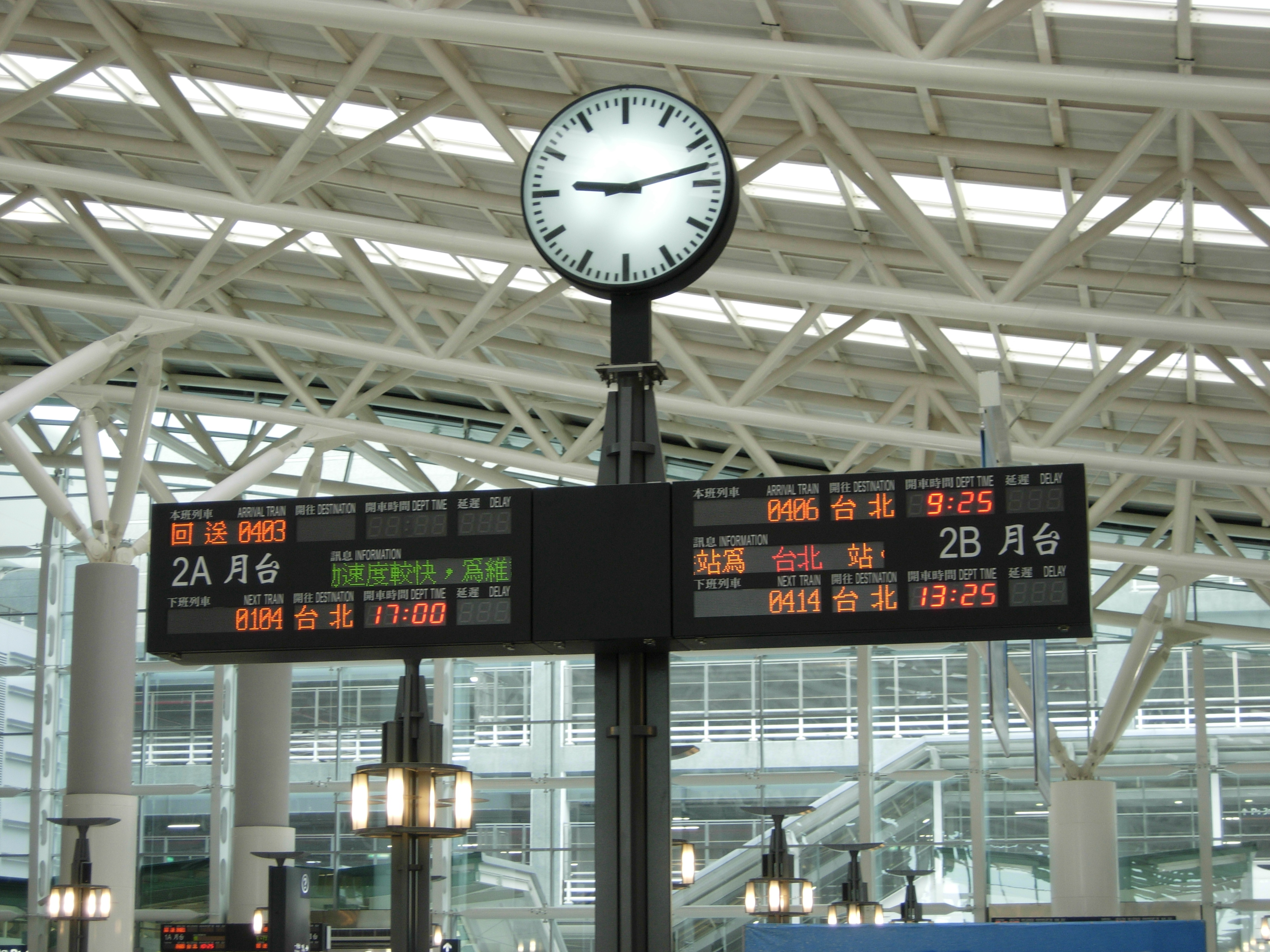
THSR Zuoying station

There are two stops on the West Coast Line of Taiwan Railway that serve Zuoying District: Zuoying–Jiucheng Station and Xinzuoying Station.

The Taiwan High Speed Rail (THSR) serves the Kaohsiung metropolitan area with Zuoying HSR station, currently the terminal and a joint station with TRA's Xinzuoying Station and KMRT's Zuoying Station.

== Notable natives ==
- Chu Ke-liang former comedian
- Jeannie Hsieh, singer-songwriter, dancer, actress and model
- Lin Chuan, Premier of the Republic of China (2016–2017)
