= Chi Ming Palace =

Temple in Kaohsiung, Taiwan

- 啟明堂
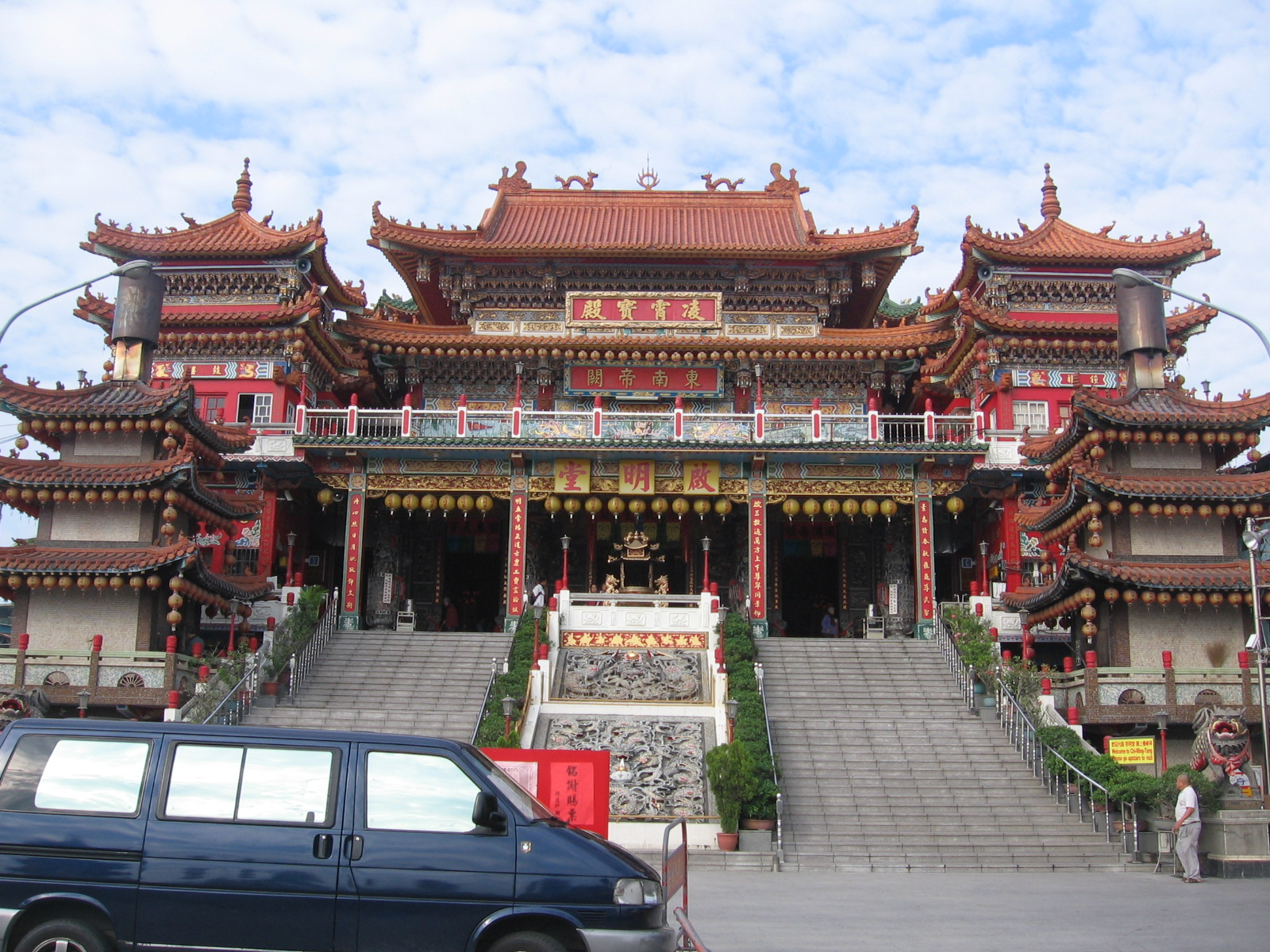
- Interactive map of the Chi Ming Palace area

General information
- Location: Zuoying, Kaohsiung, Taiwan
- Coordinates: 22°40′56″N 120°17′32″E

Chi Ming Palace (Chinese: 啟明堂; pinyin: Qǐmíng Táng) is a temple located on Lotus Lake in Zuoying District, Kaohsiung, Taiwan.

Also called Southeast of Dili Que hall, Chi Ming palace is the most spectacular temple by Lotus Lake. Located in the west and facing the east. In 1628, Qing army occupied Taiwan, to promote Confucianism, culture and education; hence, magistrate Yang Fang Sheng had set up “Confucian Temple” at Zuoying and built “Minglun hall” at left side. In addition to there are military and political center in Zuoying, it took up the heavy responsibility to pass down. During the Japanese occupation of Taiwan, Japanese religions and customs had been enforced into Taiwanese society, which led to a decline in local culture, folklore and religion. It made local community to become worried. The ancestors of Chi Ming palace who built it, Xie Zhi Weng and Chen Wang Weng, constructed “Ming De Hall” and worshiped “Five Male Bodhisattva” for main Deity under Heaven's will by tossing divination blocks. Henceforward, the ancestors who built palace dedicated painstakingly for Chi Ming palace; moreover, they looked forward to maintaining Confucian orthodoxy and hoping to revive the dying culture and tradition. The palace was rebuilt in 1973 as a three-story, palace-style, and grand architecture. It is mainly dedicated to the two sages, Confucius and Lord Guan.

== Transportation ==
The palace is accessible within walking distance north of Zuoying Station of Taiwan Railway.

== See also ==
- Cide Temple
- Zuoying Ciji Temple
- Zhouzi Qingshui Temple
- Spring and Autumn Pavilions
- List of temples in Taiwan
- List of tourist attractions in Taiwan
