= Cide Temple =

Temple in Zuoying, Kaohsiung, Taiwan

Coordinates: 22°41′04.6″N 120°17′27.4″E

- Traditional Chinese: 店仔頂慈德宮
- Literal meaning: Palace of Kindness & Virtue on Dianziding Street
Transcriptions
Standard Mandarin
- Hanyu Pinyin: Diànzǐdǐng Cídé Gōng

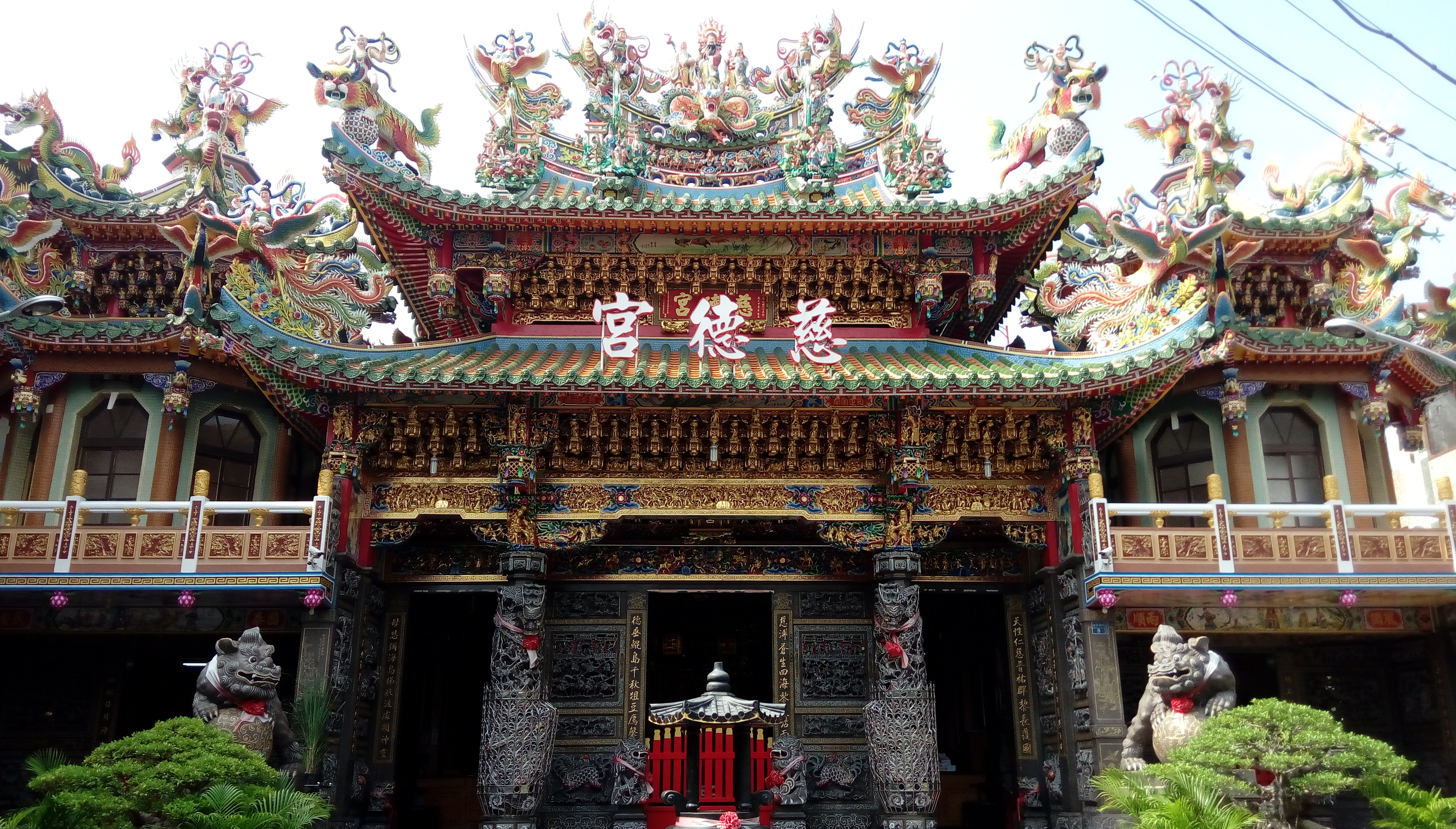
Cide Palace

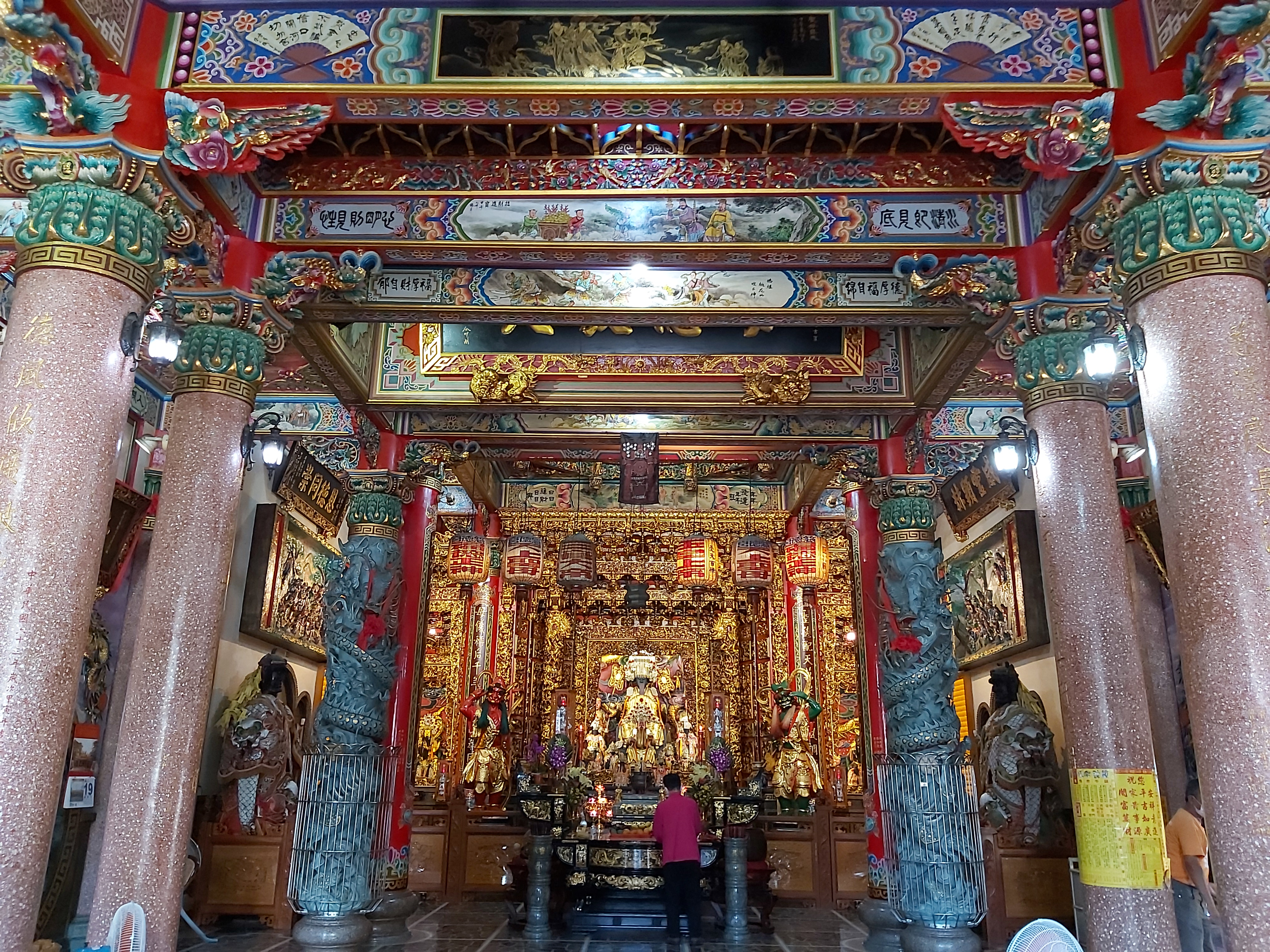
Interior of the Cide Temple

Other names

Liujia Temple
- Traditional Chinese: 六甲廟
Transcriptions
Standard Mandarin
- Hanyu Pinyin: Liùjiǎ Miào

Dianziding Street Temple
- Traditional Chinese: 店仔頂廟
Transcriptions
Standard Mandarin
- Hanyu Pinyin: Diànzǐdǐng Miào

Mazu Temple
- Traditional Chinese: 媽祖廟
- Literal meaning: Temple of the Mother
Transcriptions
Standard Mandarin
- Hanyu Pinyin: Māzǔ Miào

Tianhou Temple
- Traditional Chinese: 天后宮
- Literal meaning: Palace of the Queen of Heaven
Transcriptions
Standard Mandarin
- Hanyu Pinyin: Tiānhòu Gōng
- Wade–Giles: T'ien-hou Kung

The Cide Temple on Dianziding Street, also known as the Dianziding, Liujia, Mazu, or Tianhou Temple, is a temple northwest of Lotus Lake in Zuoying District, Kaohsiung, Taiwan. In Chinese, it is commonly distinguished by its location.

== History ==
The temple was originally built as an unnamed temple to the Chinese earth god Tudigong. In 1821, the temple was renamed the Palace of Kindness and Virtue and rededicated to both Tudigong and Mazu, the deified form of Lin Moniang from medieval Fujian who is worshipped as the Goddess of Sea and also honoured as the Queen of Heaven. In 1941, amid the Second World War, the Japanese occupation government converted to an agriculture office and later a regimental branch office. The Japanese ordered the demolition of the palace, but it was rebuilt from 1973 to 1976.

== Services ==
On Mazu's birthday according to the Chinese lunar calendar, the temple hosts a Taiwanese opera group who performs on a stage in front of the temple's main hall.

== See also ==
- Qianliyan & Shunfeng'er
- List of Mazu temples around the world
- Chi Ming Palace
- Zuoying Ciji Temple
- Zhouzi Qingshui Temple
- Spring and Autumn Pavilions
- List of temples in Taiwan
- Religion in Taiwan
