= Zuoying Ciji Temple =

Temple in Zuoying, Kaohsiung, Taiwan

Coordinates: 22.6808°N 120.2908°E

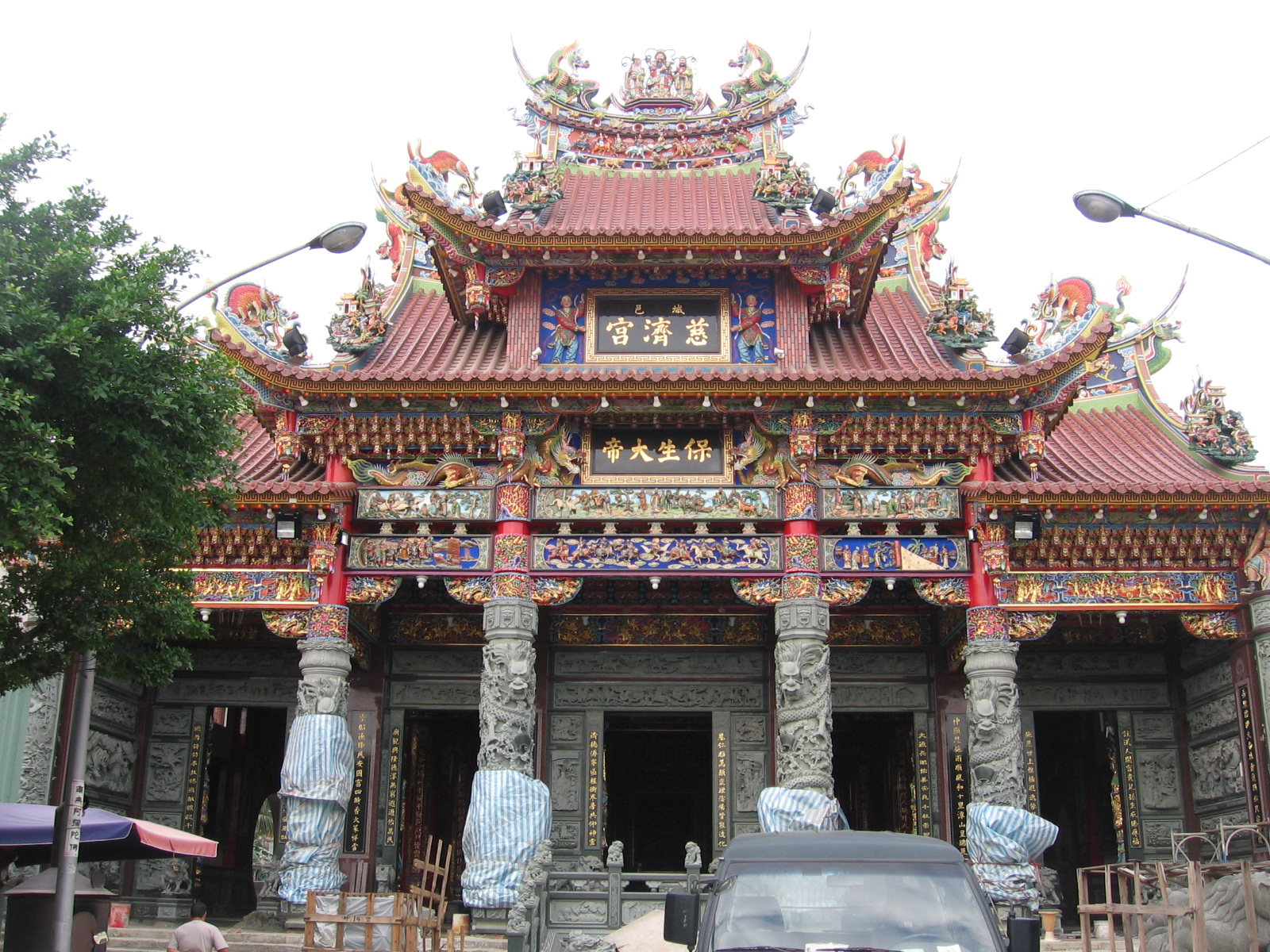
Zuoying Ciji Temple

Zuoying Ciji Temple (Chinese: 慈濟宮; pinyin: Cí jì gōng) or Bao Sheng Da Di Temple (保生大帝) is a temple by Lotus Lake in Zuoying District, Kaohsiung, Taiwan.

== See also ==
- Poh Seng Tai Tay
- Cide Temple
- Chi Ming Palace
- Zhouzi Qingshui Temple
- Spring and Autumn Pavilions
- List of temples in Taiwan
- Religion in Taiwan
