= Lotus Pond, Kaohsiung =

Reservoir in Zuoying, Kaohsiung, Taiwan

Lotus Pond
- 蓮池潭 (Chinese)
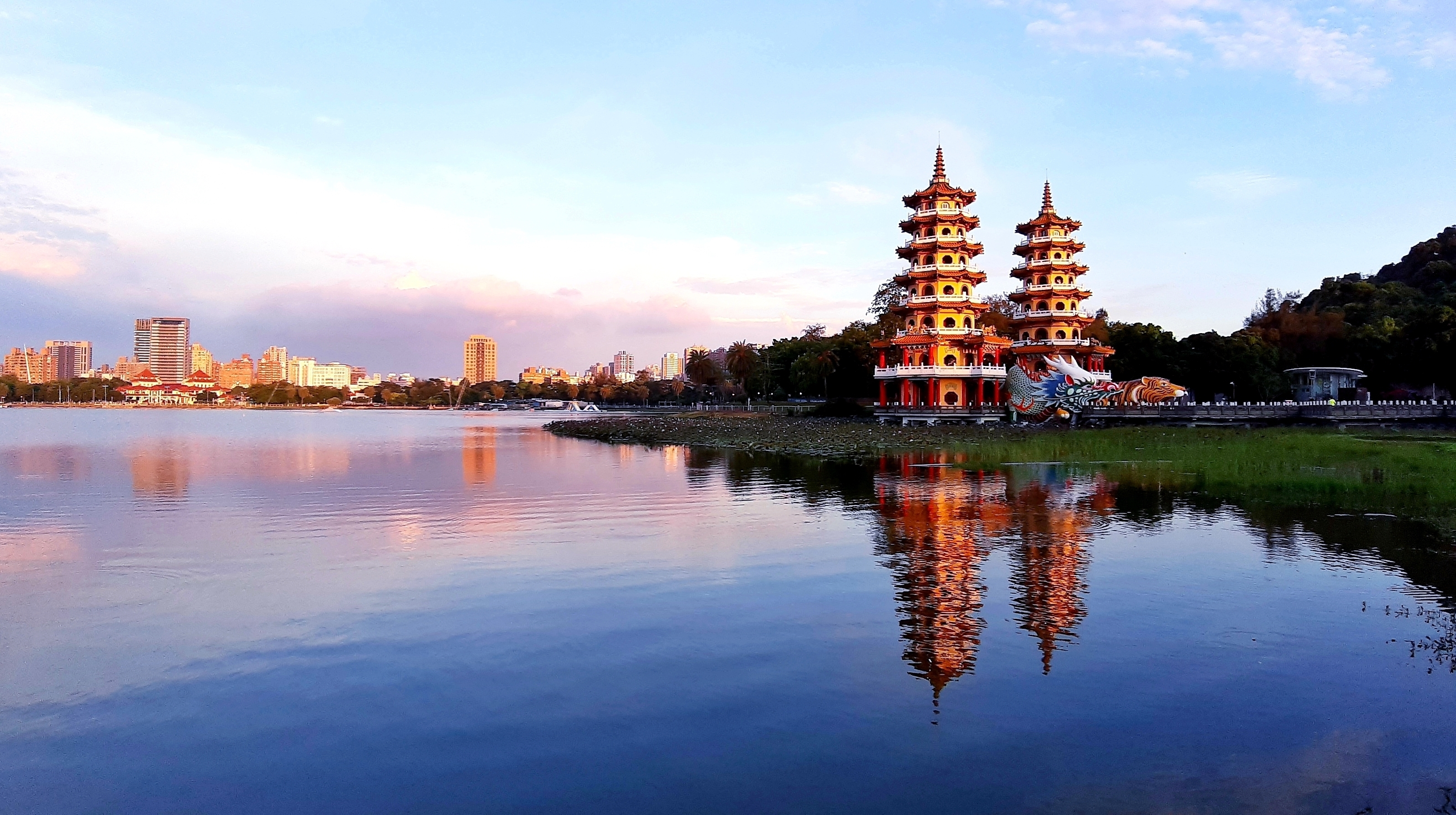

- Location within Taiwan
- Location: Zuoying, Kaohsiung, Taiwan
- Coordinates: 22.68506°N 120.297396°E
- Type: Reservoir
- Built: 1951

Lotus Pond (Chinese: 蓮池潭; pinyin: Liánchí Tán; Pe̍h-ōe-jī: Liân-tî-thâm) is an artificial lake and popular tourist destination on the east side of Zuoying District in Kaohsiung, Taiwan. Opened in 1951, it is famous for the lotus plants on the lake and the numerous temples around the lake, including the Spring and Autumn Pavilions, the Dragon and Tiger Pagodas and the Confucian Temple (孔廟).

Lotus Pond was the site for several water sporting events for World Games 2009, including canoe polo, water ski, and dragon boat.

== Temples ==
=== Kaohsiung Confucius Temple ===
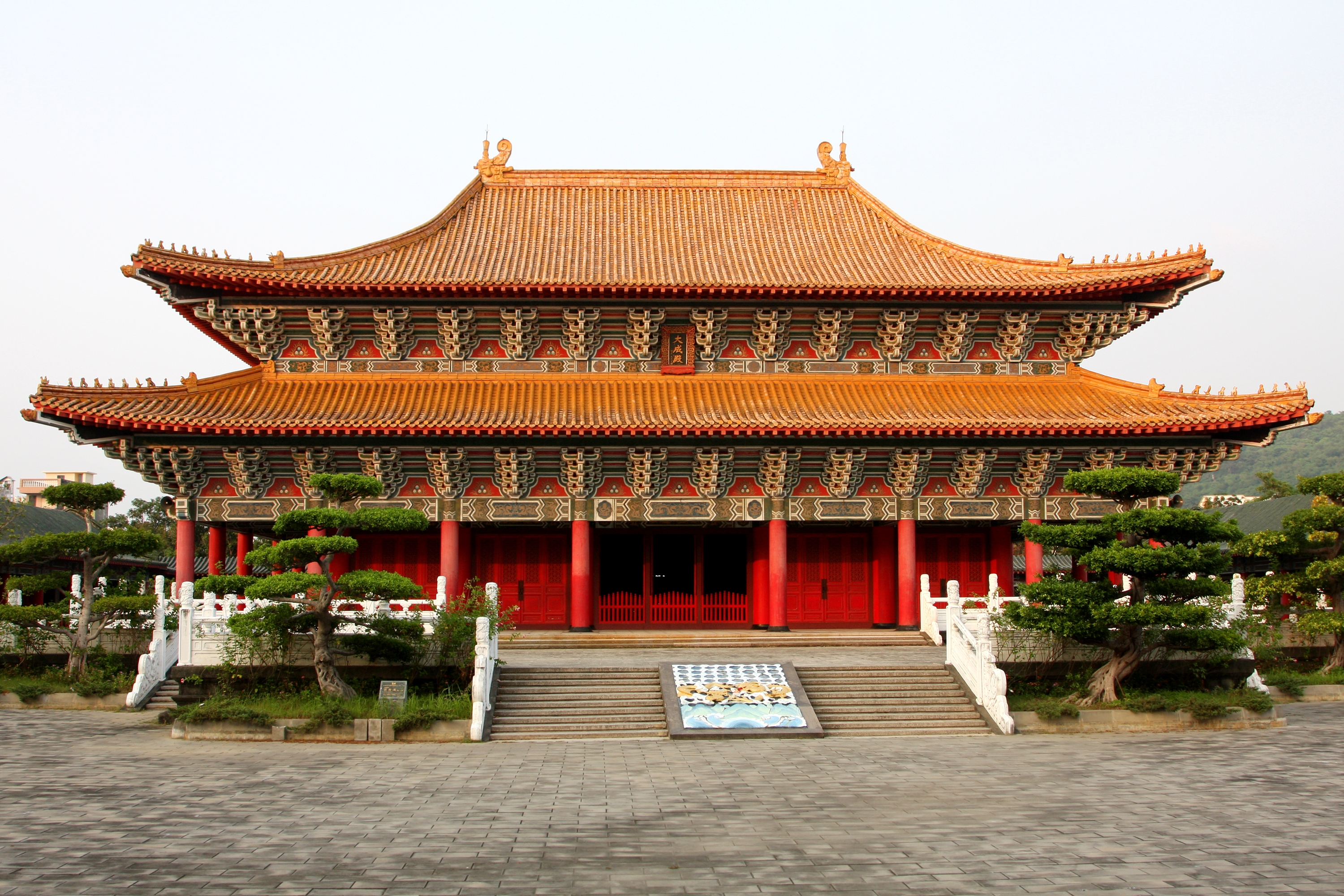
Kaohsiung Confucius Temple

The old Confucius Temple was originally built in 1684. The temple has a circumference of to 122 meters. However, during the Japanese colonial period due to lack of maintenance, the only part of the original structure was the Chong Sheng Shrine, which is presently located in the west side of Old City Elementary School nearby Lotus Pond. The new Confucius Temple was located in northwest corner of Lotus Pond; then, it was relocated and rebuilt in 1977, located in North Shore of Lotus Pond. Its pattern had followed Song Dynasty Confucian temple and Shandong Qufu Confucius Temple layouts as model; its Dacheng hall had followed the layouts of the Supreme Harmony Hall of the Imperial Palace. It had Xia and Shang and Zhou's color and culture with yellow tiles covering the roof, black foundations stand on the floor, red pillars, windows and doors, and white stone railings. And it is the largest measure in Taiwan. Its Confucius Ceremony still follows the traditional of Ba Yi Dance (eight dancers in eight rows).

=== Spring and Autumn Pavilions ===
This temple complex was established in 1953. It is named after the two Chinese palace-style pavilions built there, the Spring and Autumn Pavilions. Each of these is four-storey and octagonal, with green tiles and yellow walls, and like an antique pagoda reflected in the water. They communicate with each other by 9 bend bridge and are also called "Spring and autumn Royal Pavilion", set up by commemorated "The Martial Saint, Lord Kua". There is a Guanyin statue which is riding a dragon in the front end of the Spring and Autumn Pavilions. According to local legend, the Goddess of Mercy riding a dragon appeared in the clouds and instruct followers to build an effigy in the form of its coming out between the two pavilions so this statue was built.

=== Dragon and Tiger Pagodas ===
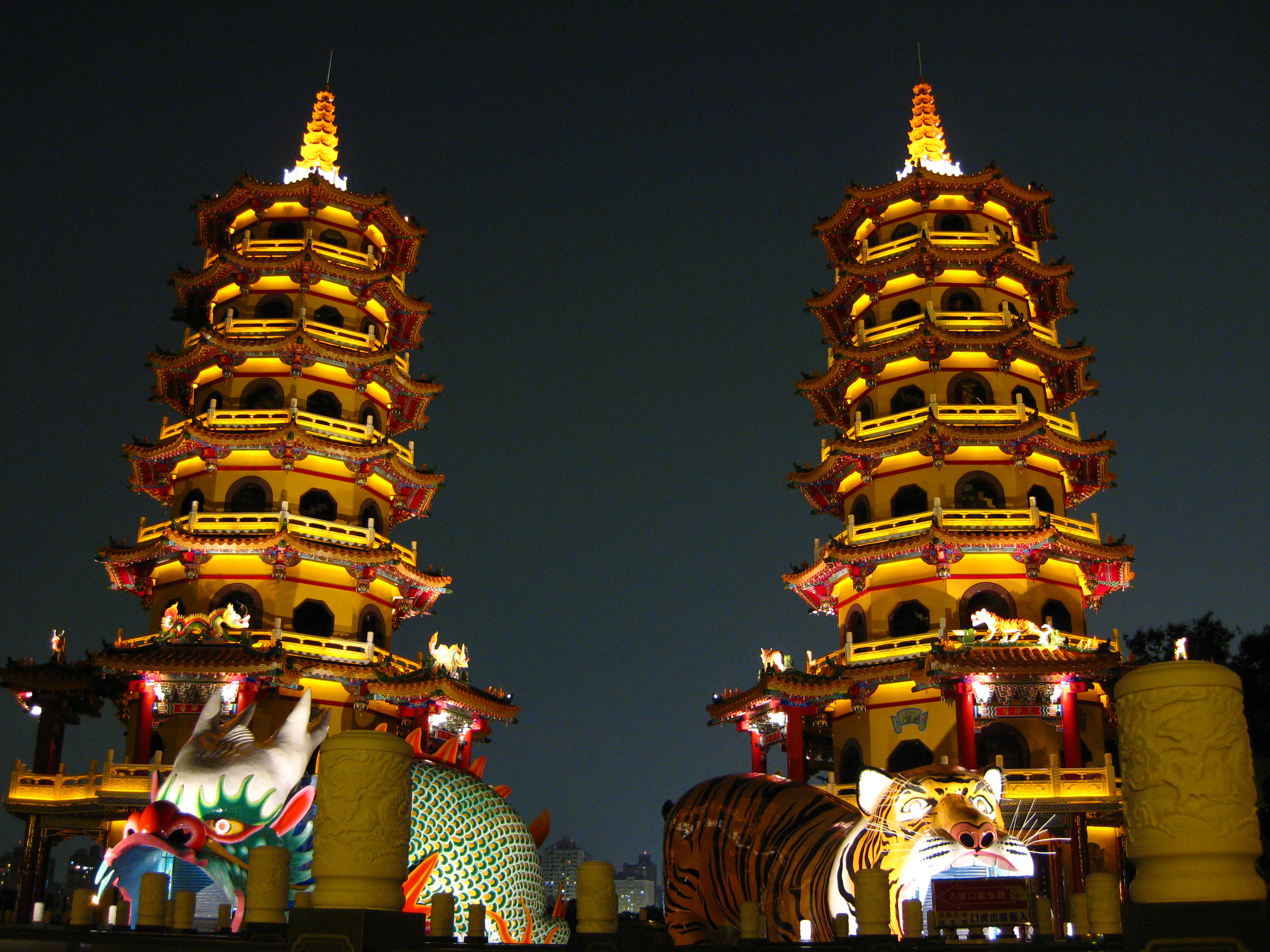
Dragon and Tiger Pagodas

The Dragon and Tiger Pagodas towers have a height of seven stories, and are constructed to stand on the lake. The fronts of the buildings have dragon and tiger statues, respectively. Visitors enter the towers through the statues' bodies. Entering the dragon's mouth and exiting via the tiger's mouth is believed to be auspicious. The towers are connected to the shore with a 9-angle bridge (九曲橋). Inside the tiger and dragon figures are work art telling stories of the good and bad and some historical expressions of Chinese tradition. In the Dragon tower, illustrations of filial piety are painted; while the Tiger tower has illustrations of the twelve Magi and the Jade Emperor's thirty palaces.

=== Pei Chi Pavilion ===
Pei Chi Pavilion (Chinese: 北極亭; pinyin: Běijí Tíng) honors the Daoist deity Xuan Wu under the honorific "God-Emperor of the North Pole"; it belongs to Zuoying Yuan Di Temple and Feng Gu Palace. It claims to have the highest water statues in Southeast Asia. According to legend, Xuan Wu spoke through mediums to order the building of this pavilion.

The pavilion itself is 72 meters tall and made from grout and the Seven-Star sword in the god's hand is length of 38.5 meters. Its peaks has gullies and fountains to serve as background, and it used arch bridge connected statues. The place of worshiping and office of temple is under the statue.

=== Chi Ming Palace ===
Also called Southeast of Dili Que hall, Chi Ming Palace is a temple by Lotus Pond. Located in the west and facing the east, the temple was rebuilt in 1973 as a three-story, palace-style grand architecture. It is mainly for the worship of the two sages, Confucius and Lord Guan. While Taiwanese people were worried about being influenced by the Japanese customs, such as its culture, folklore, and religion, Those who founded Chi Ming Hall, including Xie Zhi Weng and Chen Wang Weng, constructed Ming De Hall under what they attribute to God's will, by tossing divination blocks. Those great founders have dedicated themselves to Chi Ming palace ever since in the hope of maintaining the traditional virtues and saving the society from corruption.

=== Tianfu Palace ===
Located at No.158, Liantan Rd., Zuoying Dist., Kaohsiung City 813, Taiwan, Tianfu Palace (Chinese: 天府宮; pinyin: Tiānfǔ gōng) was established in 1660. The Central Camp Marshal was worshiped in Fujian Province, Quanzhou prefecture. Tianfu Palace is not only a temple for worshipping The Central Camp Marshal, but also a champion of all temples in Zuoying which the number of pilgrims came to pilgrimage. The palace provides comfortable accommodation and receives deeply praise from pilgrims.

=== God Temple (Saint-doors Inside the celestial palace) (Chinese: 天公廟(聖門靈霄寶殿); pinyin: Tiāngōng miào (shèng mén líng xiāo bǎo diàn)) ===
Located at No.1, Ln. 549, Zuoying Avenue, Zuoying Dist., Kaohsiung City 813, Taiwan. It worships Father of God, Mother NuWa of Goddess and Jade God of the folk beliefs, called God. 1957, it built the front and rear temples and called Inside the celestial palace. It designed a huge painting of masterpiece of “Neigh Dragon heavenward”, and it's also a spiritual that symbolize by known as "the first word of Tain". And its gradation has the ancient traditional technology art of “Elegant handwriting” which is a foundation work for commemorating ancestors.

=== Sianshu Three Mountain Palace ===
Located at No.240, Zuoying Sia Rd., Zuoying Dist., Kaohsiung City 813, Taiwan, Sianshu Three Mountain Palace (Chinese: 仙樹三山宮; pinyin: Xiānshù Sān Shāngōng) was situated in opposite with new Confucian Temple of Lotus Pond and situated in Hello Market of Zuoying. It worships three Mountain Spirits for Jin Mountain, Ming Mountain and Du Mountain of Chaozhou prefecture and they are a natural mountain godhead and portrait. Xian Shu Father God is a mountain Portrait statue. There are a wearing-scholarly guardian father who managed documents and a wearing-helmets and armor house father whose feats is excellent. Xian Ju Father God had originated from the belief of Chaozhou prefecture, later; it had extended to Hakka village, and possesses features of Hakka hometown.

=== Jhenfu Temple ===
Located at 3F., No.81, Ln. 6, Zuoying Avenue, Zuoying Dist., Kaohsiung City 813, Taiwan, Jhenfu Temple (Chinese: 鎮福廟; pinyin: Zhènfú Miào) was established at 1661, called Zhen Fu union originally, and followers called it “Pei Chai To Land God Temple”. It worships Earth God and patron saint of Pei Chai To and the North Gate. Zhen Fu Temple is the Monument Class I abreast with Gongchen well of North Gate and The Old City. The Earth God blesses every household for peace and Good harvest. Local ancestors extended to celebrate birth of the Earth God on 15 August in lunar calendar.

=== Cheng Huang Temple (Chinese: 城隍廟; pinyin: Chénghuángmiào) ===
The Old City Cheng Huang Temple was built in 1704. It worships Cheng Huang. When the Fengshan country ruled in this time, Residents constructed straw hut out of North Gate to worship the Cheng Huang which was the first model of the Old City Cheng Huang Temple. The Cheng Huang Temple was originally a gateway of The Old City area and the trade. At that time, Pi Chai Tau Street was crowded and bustling. Believers shuttled in front of the temple. It became an important gateway of trade. It experienced Lin Shuangwen rebellion, the county was moved to Fengshan, destroyed by Japanese, the government retreated to Taiwan, damages by refugees, and many time of rehabilitations and rebuilds. The history of Cheng Huang Temple is the miniature of southern Taiwan experienced ups and downs for 200 years. In temple, every board and joss seems to talk quietly about the footsteps of ancestors. The Old City Cheng Huang Temple will tour Zuoying inside and outside for thirteen spots about every birthday of Lunar Calendar on 20 May. It still is one of the important activities in the Zuoying Temple fair.

=== Qing Shui Temple ===
The Qing Shui Temple worships the Master Qing Shui who was a national hero in Sung Dynasty who fought against the Yuan army. His jobs included the holding of management of awards for good deeds and punishment for evil deeds. He saved the souls of thousands of people. The temple is located at East to West, the front side is Lotus Pond, right is Ban-Ping hill, and left side leaning Guishan. Set of Eastern and Western architectural features of the merger; its construction is majestic and manner is solemn.

=== Cide Palace ===
Cide Palace worships Mazu and Commonly be known as Matsu Temple. During the Japanese Occupation Period, Japanese had even set up agriculture office for the temple; afterwards, was changed to The Regiment branch. Cide Palace was rebuilt at 1973, and finished at 1976. The Japanese government ordered to abolish the position of Cide Palace; however, it was rebuilt after Taiwan Restoration. While every birthday of gods, the temple will invite Taiwanese opera group to perform. And it is very special about building a stage in front of temple.

=== Cih Ji Palace ===
The Cih Ji Palace worships Baosheng Dadi. Every Chungyuan Festival, every household hangs radish on door for memorial service. Putting sacrifice on table before the god such as radish, animal sacrifice, Glutinous rice lump and fruits to offer sacrifices to gods or ancestors. This ceremony of sacrificing radish still was rumored in civil. Cih Ji Palace was originally built in 1719 at Feng Shan, moved to Zuoying and renovated in 1960, worshiping Baosheng Dadi, Black Tiger Marshal and other gods; they became patron saint of local residents and endless stream of pilgrims. In 1974, Baosheng Dadi ordered to build Dragon and Tiger Pagodas. Zuoying Dragon and Tiger Pagodas has become the one of famous landmarks after it finished construction.

== Kaohsiung Produce Pavilion ==
Located on Cuihua Road, the Pavilion markets high-quality agricultural products from Kaohsiung. The Pavilion sells agricultural products and also has a deli area offering meals that feature local ingredients. There are also DIY classroom teaching handcrafts and cooking classroom using local ingredients.

== Gallery ==
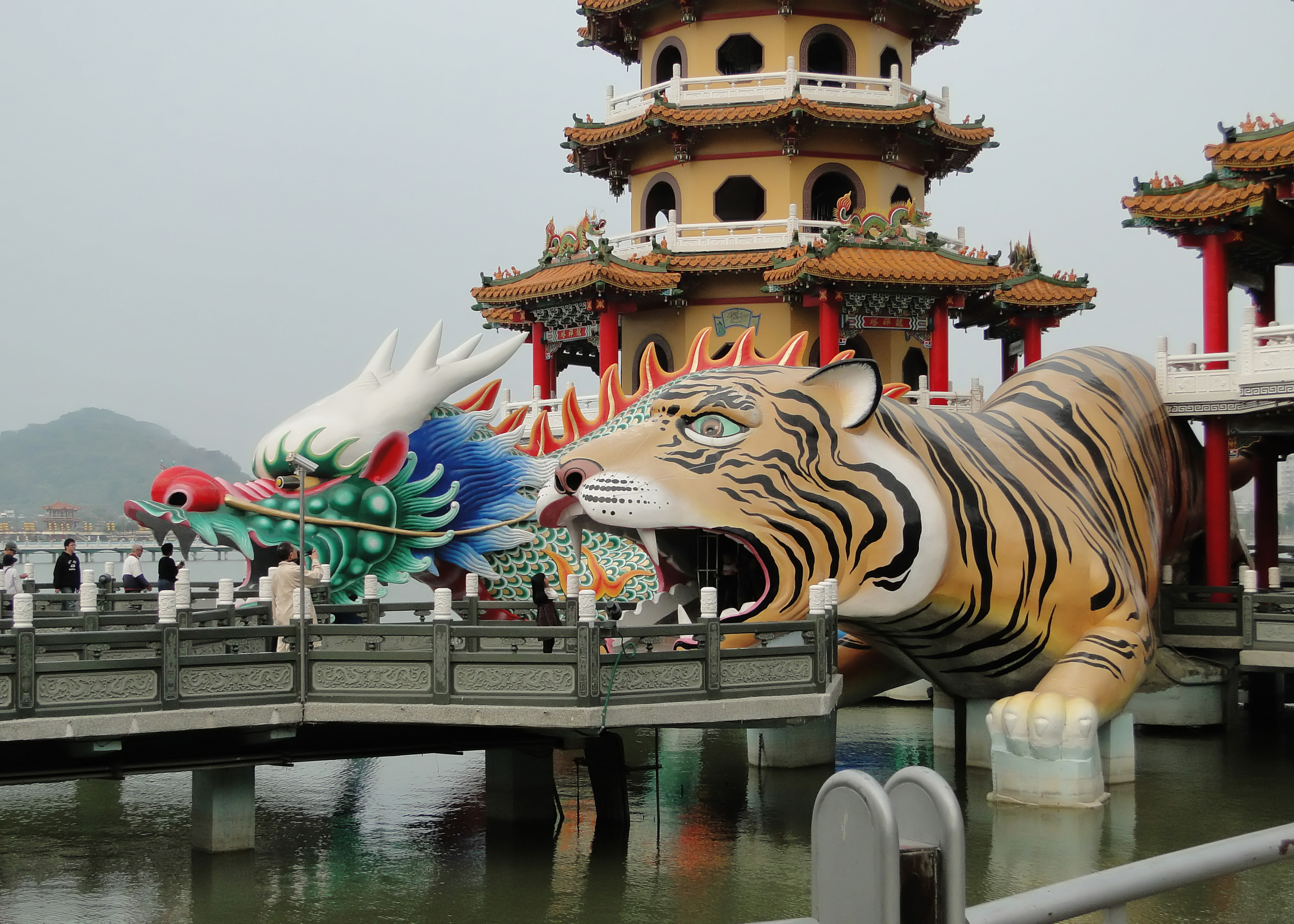
Dragon and Tiger Pagodas

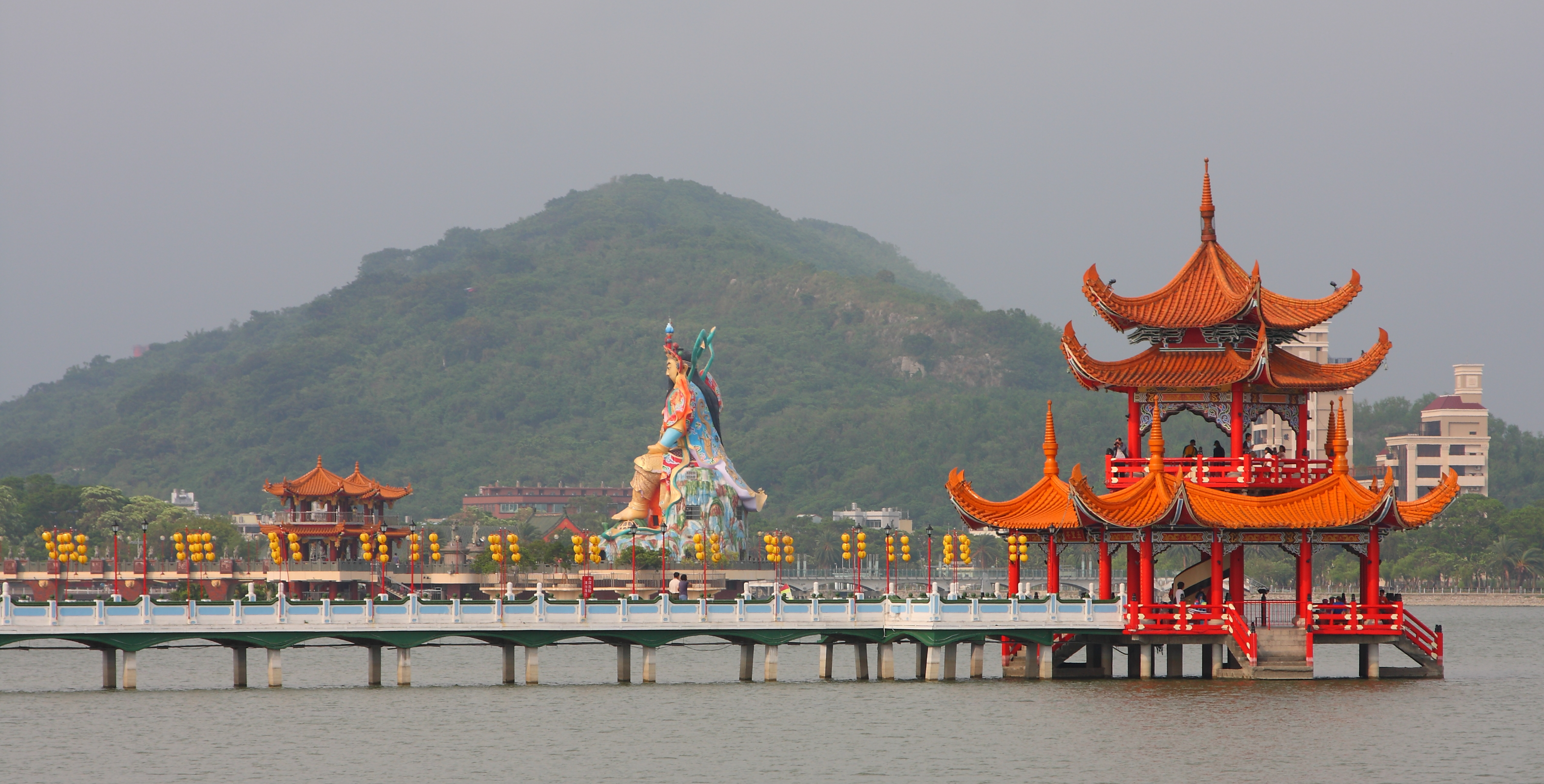
Wuli Pavilion

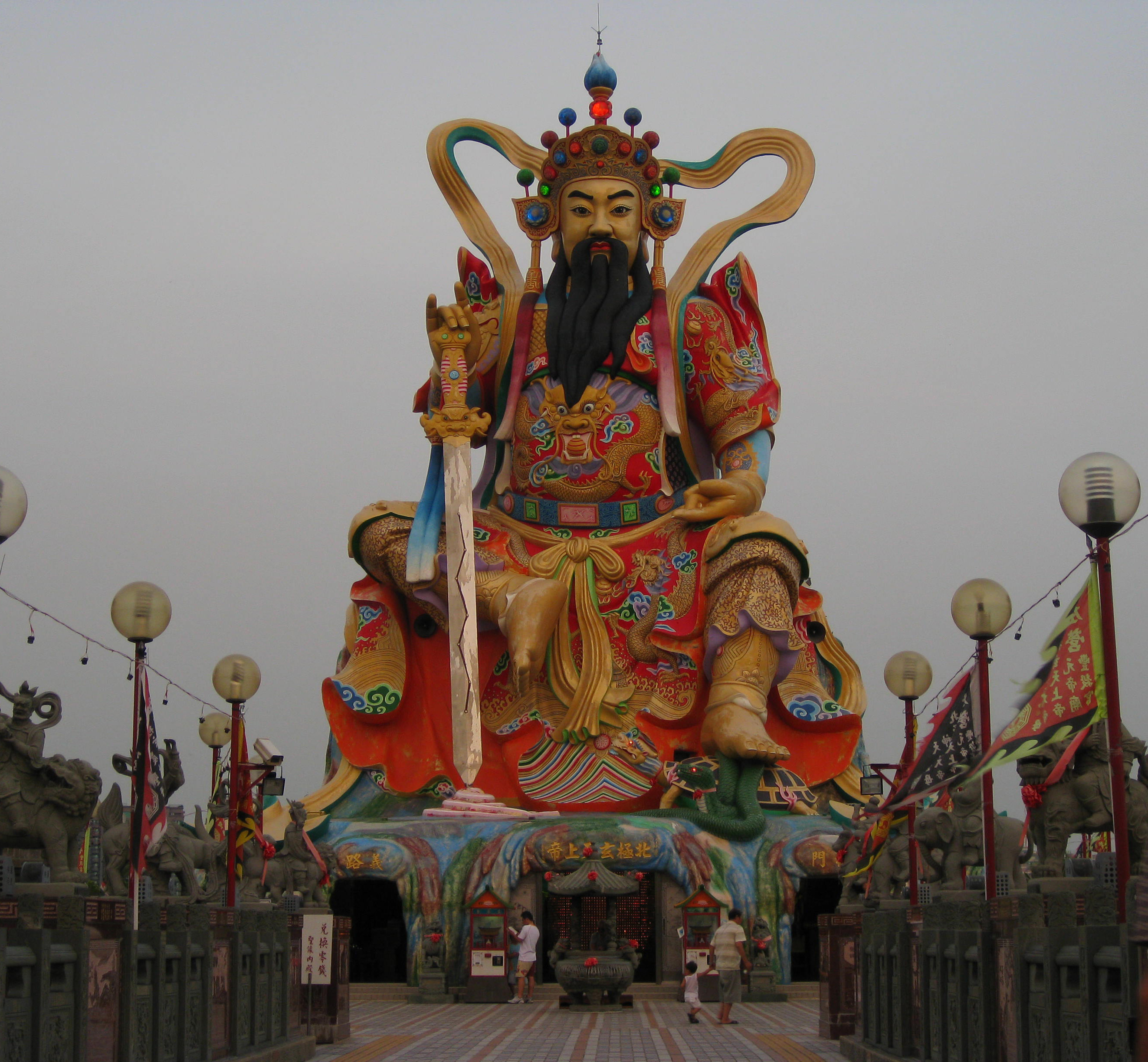
Statue of Taoist God

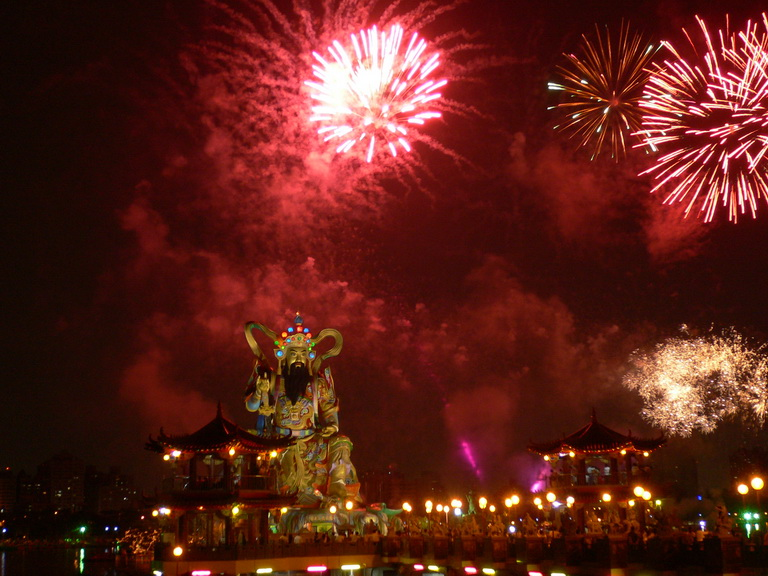
Lotus Pond at night
