= Zhouzi Qingshui Temple =

Temple in Zuoying, Kaohsiung, Taiwan

Qing Shui Temple
- 清水宮
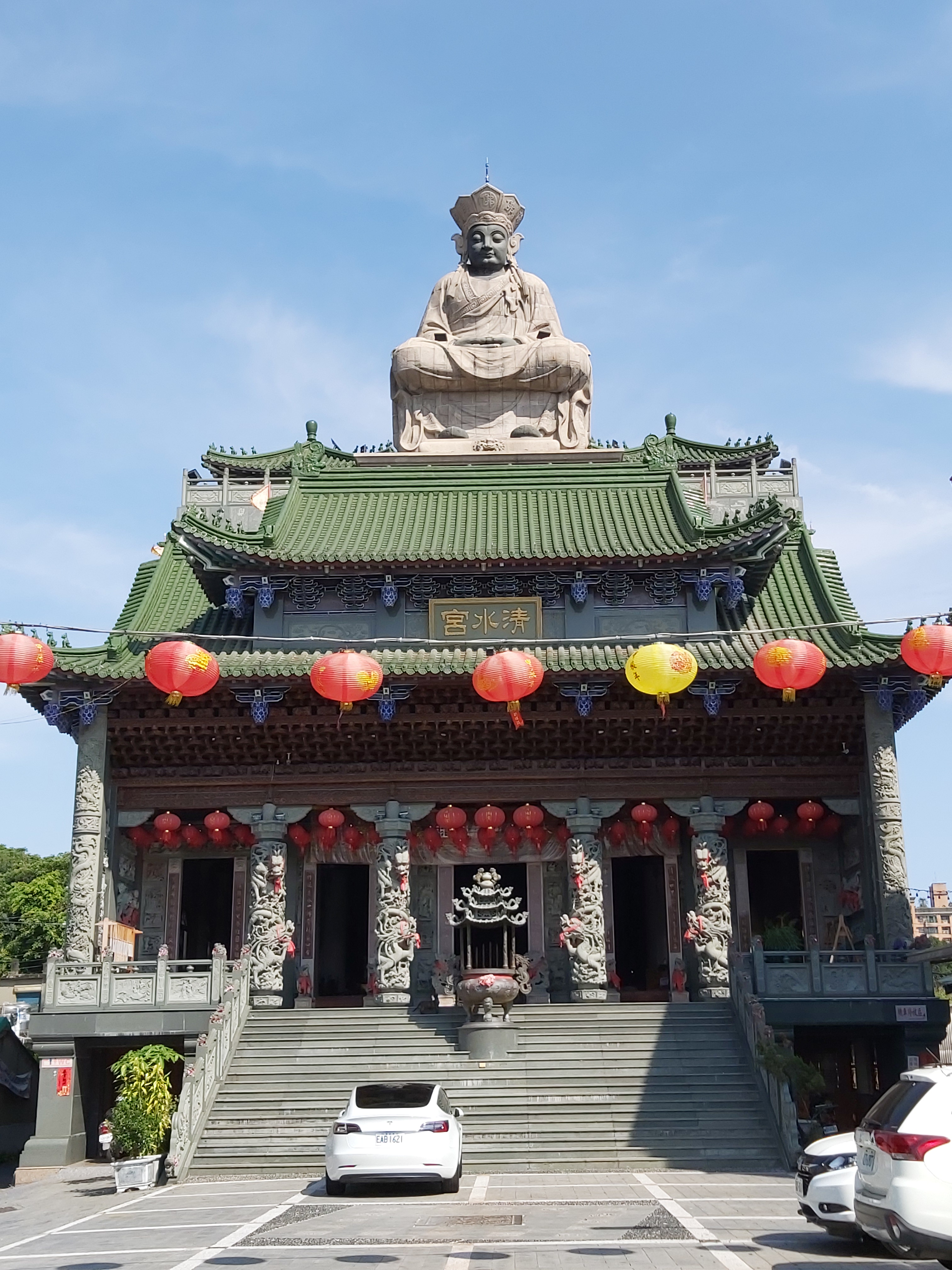

Location
- Location: Zuoying, Kaohsiung, Taiwan
- Interactive map of Qing Shui Temple
- Coordinates: 22.6841°N 120.2996°E

Architecture
- Completed: 1938

The Qing Shui Temple (Chinese: 清水宮; pinyin: Qīngshuǐ Gōng) is a temple located around Lotus Lake in Zuoying District, Kaohsiung, Taiwan.

== Description ==
The temple is situated at the East and faces to the West. Lotus Lake is in front of the temple. On its right hand side lays Panping Mountain, and its left hand side is Great and Small Tortoise Mountains. The temple's style is a mixture of Eastern and Western. The structure is magnificent and the impressive style is dignified and solemn. The statue of the intelligent and courageous master garrisoned the village at then trance. It is height of 50 feet, length of 30 feet and width of 28 feet. It was inlaid by 387 units of Hunglung stones. The wooden carved traditional palace lanterns hung at the main temple has an impressive dignified and solemn air. The celestial dragons, lighting lamps, net walls, arches, relief in sculptures, tablets, and net windows are all carved in Chinese cypress with its true color remained. The door gods made of sunflower pear solemn. The sculptors of Tungyang of Chekiang Province especially came here to do the carving and inlaying work. The round columns and walls inside the temple adopt natural milky white fossils matched with wood sculptures. It set up both of elevators and staircases are facing each other; it's safe and convenient.

== History ==
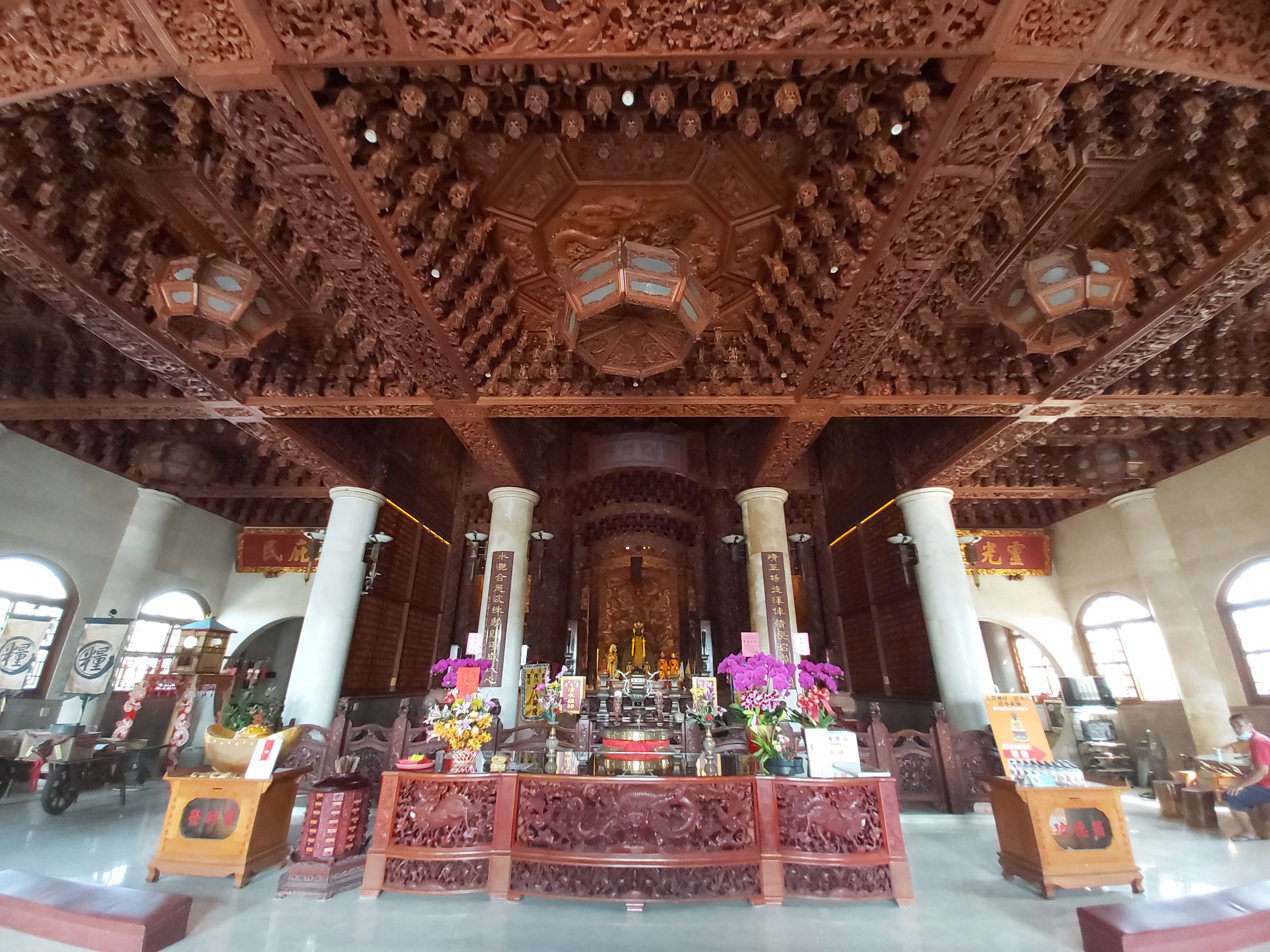
Interior of the Temple.

This temple is dedicated to Patriarch Ching Chwee, a national hero who fought against the Yuan army and helped resume the Sung dynasty. His job included the management of awards for good deeds and punishment for evil deeds in the domains of Yin and Yang. He saved the souls of thousands of people. Whatever they requested, the Master must give them. His kindness knew no bounds, and the fruits he brought were numerous.
