= Lin Ching-hsuan (disambiguation) =

Lin Ching-hsuan may refer to:

- Lin Ching-hsuan (writer) (1953–2019), Taiwanese writer
- Lin Ching-hsuan (long jumper) (born 1992), Taiwanese long jumper

== See also ==
- Li Ching-hsüan
