= Huang Jie (politician) =

Taiwanese politician

Huang Jie MLY
- 黃捷
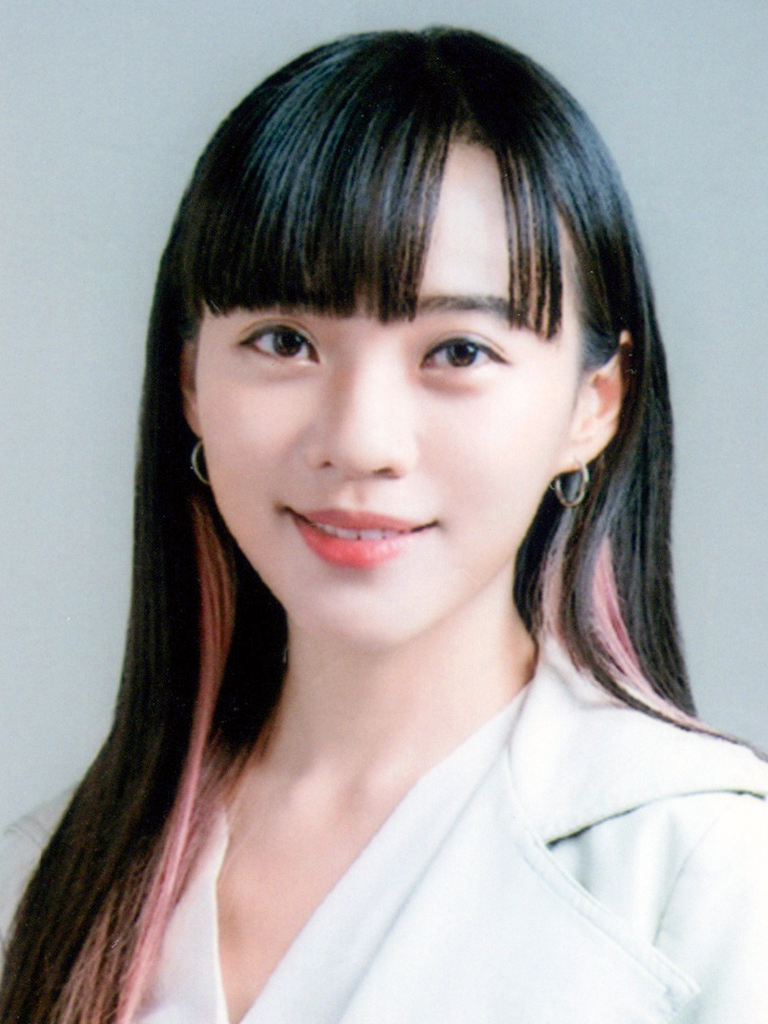
- Official portrait, 2024

Member of the Legislative Yuan
- Incumbent
- Assumed office 1 February 2024
- Preceded by: Chao Tien-lin
- Constituency: Kaohsiung VI

Kaohsiung City Councillor
- In office 25 December 2018 – 31 January 2024
- Constituency: District 9 (Fongshan)

Personal details
- Born: 19 January 1993 (age 33) Fongshan, Kaohsiung, Taiwan
- Party: Democratic Progressive Party (2023–present); New Power Party (2018–2020); Independent (2020–2023)
- Education: National Taiwan University (BS, BA)

Huang Jie (Chinese: 黃捷; pinyin: Huáng Jié; Wade–Giles: Huang^{2} Chieh^{2}; Pe̍h-ōe-jī: N̂g Chia̍p, born 19 January 1993) is a Taiwanese politician and a former member of the New Power Party. She was elected to the Kaohsiung City Council in 2018, representing Fongshan District. Huang is known for questioning the policies of former Kaohsiung mayor Han Kuo-yu. In the 2024 Taiwanese legislative election, she was elected to the Legislative Yuan as a candidate of the Democratic Progressive Party to represent the sixth constituency of Kaohsiung, making her the first openly gay member of the chamber.

== Education ==
After graduating from Kaohsiung Municipal Girls' Senior High School, Huang earned dual bachelor's degrees in public health and sociology from National Taiwan University. She then began graduate studies in environmental health at the university but left the program to work as a journalist and, later, as a legislative assistant for the New Power Party. She briefly returned to the academic program but took a second leave of absence in order to return to Fongshan to run for city council.

== Kaohsiung City Council ==
Huang is known for criticizing Han Kuo-yu's plan to establish a free economic zone in Kaohsiung in a viral video where she rolled her eyes after Han seemed unable or unwilling to give details about his plan. She left the New Power Party on August 26, 2020.

On February 6, 2021, she faced an unsuccessful Kuomintang-led recall attempt, with 65,256 voting against the recall versus 55,394 voting in favor and a 41.54% turnout; furthermore the number of votes in favor of the recall did not meet the required threshold of 25% of eligible voters, or 72,892 votes. The recall attempt was viewed by Huang's supporters as retaliation for her role in the successful recall of former mayor Han Kuo-yu.

== Legislative Yuan ==
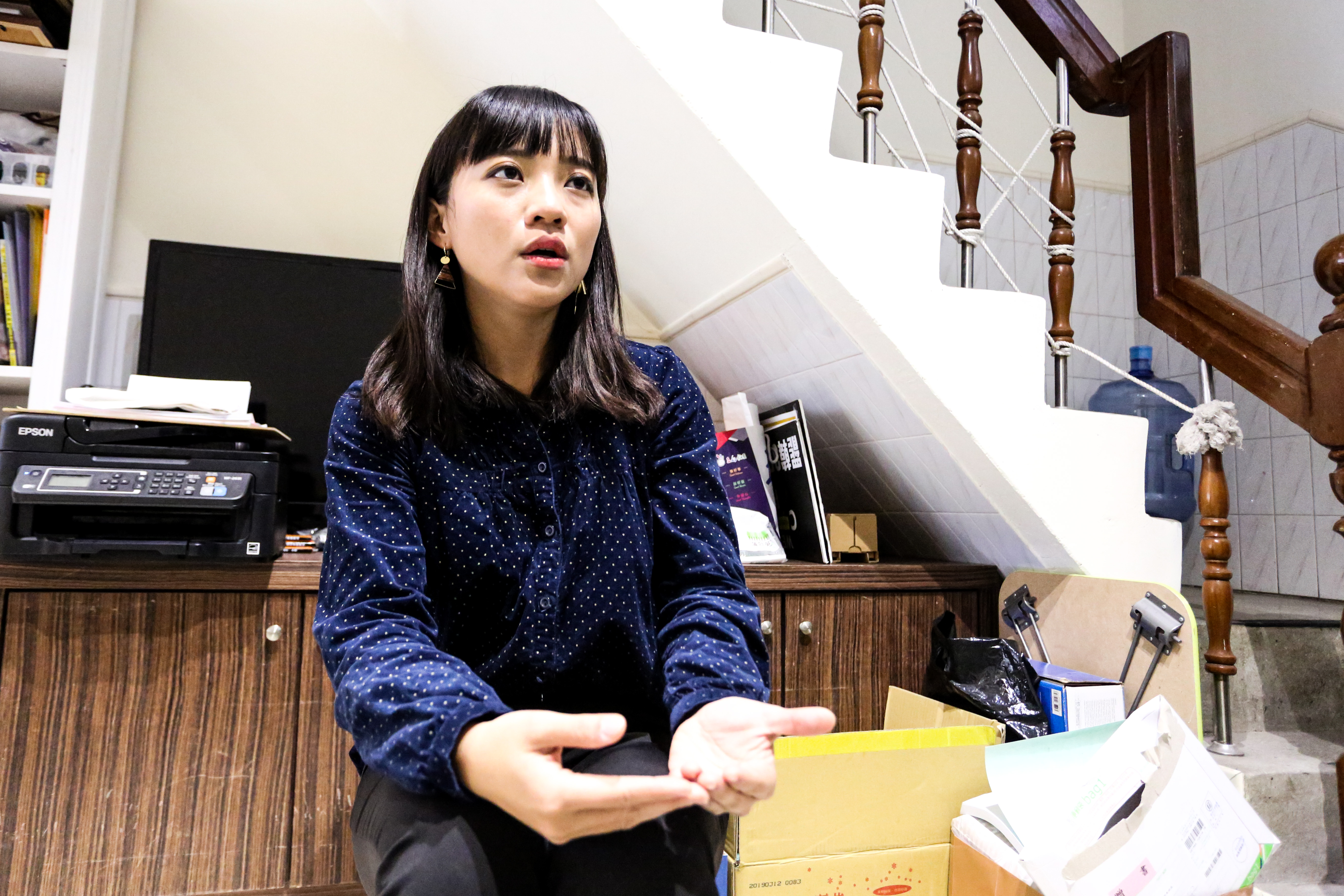
Huang in 2020

In August 2023, Huang joined the Democratic Progressive Party and became its candidate for the Legislative Yuan representing Kaohsiung city's sixth constituency for the 2024 Taiwanese legislative election held on 13 January. She obtained 113,670 votes (51.01%) against the Kuomintang's Chen Mei-ya, and the Formosa Alliance's Kuo Pei-hung. Huang also became the first openly gay candidate to be elected to the Legislative Yuan. Aged 31 when she was sworn in, Huang is also the youngest member of the 11th Legislative Yuan.

On 2 October 2024, Huang was included in the "100 Next" emerging leaders list of the Time magazine for the passion about human rights and the advancement of public good, and speaking out for the underrepresented groups.

== Public image ==
On September 9, 2022, to celebrate the Mid-Autumn Festival, she cosplayed as one of the three main characters from Spy × Family alongside Lai Pin-yu and Tseng Wen-hsueh: Lai cosplayed as Yor, Tseng as Loid, and she as Anya. She posted the image on Facebook, and it received 30,000 likes.

== Awards ==
In December 2024, Huang Jie was included on the BBC's 100 Women list.
