= National Fengshan Senior High School =

National senior high school in Kaohsiung, Taiwan

National Feng-Shan Senior High School 國立鳳山高級中學
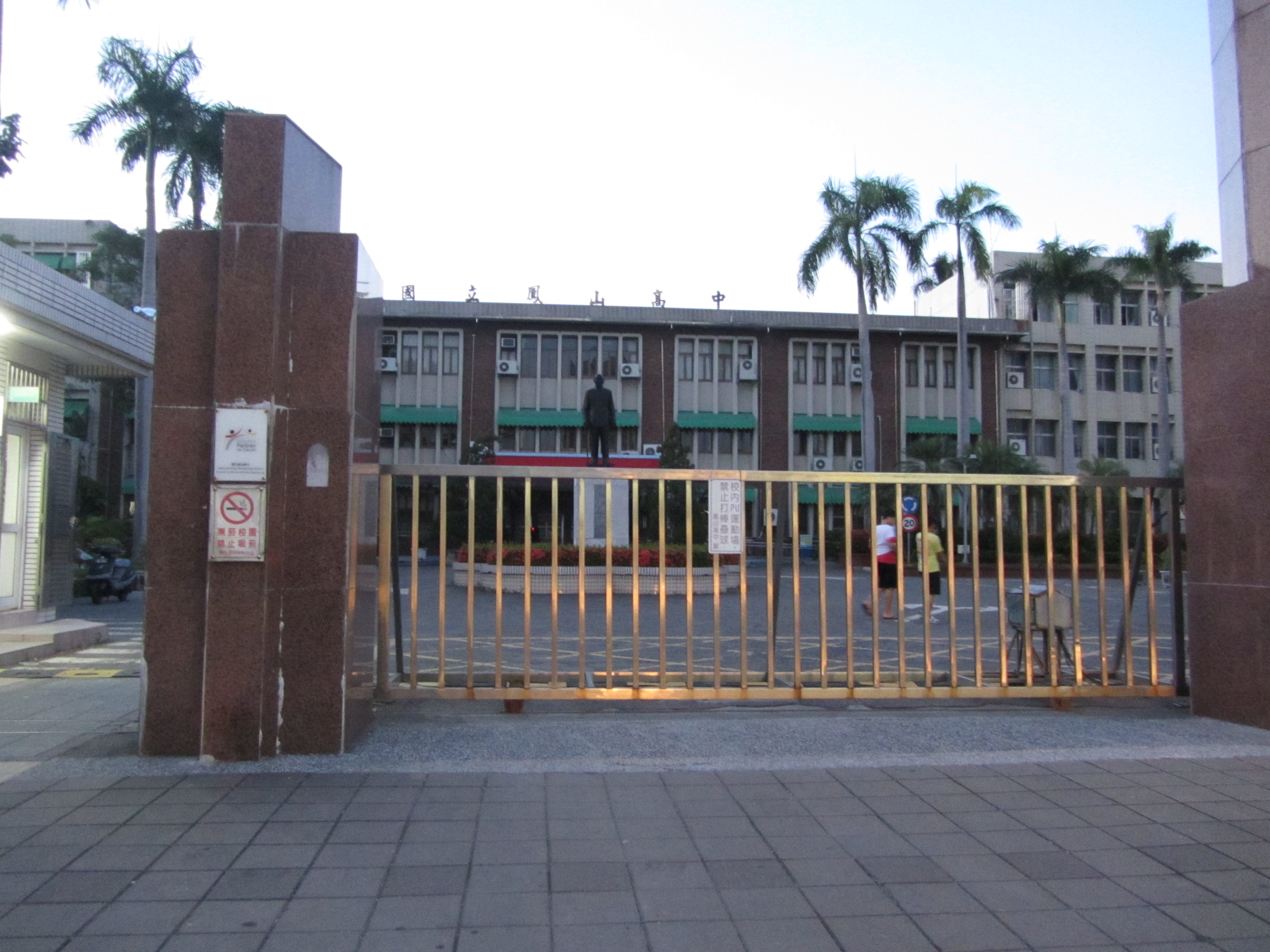

Location
- No.130, Section 2, Guanfu Road Fongshan District, Kaohsiung CityRepublic of China (Taiwan) (Postal code:830)
- Coordinates: 22.6297°N 120.3454°E

Information
- Other name: National Fong-Shan Senior High School
- Former name: Prefecture's Fengshan junior high school (高雄縣立鳳山中學); Linyuan Agricultural School (林園莊立林園農業專修學校); Fengshan Agricultural School (鳳山園藝專修學校)
- Type: National Senior high school
- Motto: Honour; Diligent&Industrious; Honesty
- Established: 1939 年 鳳山園藝專修學校; 1944年 鳳山女子農業學校; 1945年 高雄縣立鳳山初級中學; 1953年 高雄縣立鳳山中學; 1954年 臺灣省立鳳山中學; 1970年 臺灣省立鳳山高級中學; 2000年 國立鳳山高級中學
- Locale: Taiwanese Mandarin and English language
- School district: Fongshan District, Kaohsiung City, Republic of China (Taiwan)
- Principal: 陳龔聲
- Staff: 115 persons Male：44 persons（ratio 38.26%）； female：71 persons（ratio 61.73%）
- Faculty: 115 persons Male： 44 persons（ratio 38.26%）；female：71 persons（ratio 61.73%）
- Grades: Three grades (10-12)
- Age: Around 16 to 18
- Enrollment: 2093 persons Male accounts：72.5%；Female accounts：27.5%
- Classes: 55
- Average class size: 38-39
- Language: Chinese language
- Hours in school day: AVG. 9 hrs (8 AM-5 PM)
- Area: 6.9937 hectares
- Colors: Red, white, black, orange, gray
- Song: School Anthem
- Athletics: baseball, basketball
- Nickname: FSSH、Bird's high school、birds flying high
- Publication: Youth FSSH (鳳中青年) official website
- Information: Student Union Leaders: Prime: 李佳濰、 Deputy: 游承恩 （27th）
- Campus environment: Urban area, Downtown Fongshan District, Kaohsiung City
- Secondary foreign language lessons: Japanese, German, Vietnamese, and Korean
- Student Union: Student Union
- Beauty Board: Beauty FSSH
- Aluminum Union: FSSH Aluminum
- Website: www.fssh.khc.edu.tw

National Fengshan Senior High school, alias Fengshan Senior High School, abbreviated FSSH or FSHS, is a high school with a long history, marked as one of the schools as trials by the education ministry in Taiwan that mixed together both sexes in a class since past few decades from now, located in Fongshan District, Kaohsiung City, Taiwan. Important neighboring infrastructures and institutions to the school are Kaohsiung City Government (Fongshan Administrative Office and formerly Kaohsiung County Government), Taiwanese Presidential Office in southern Taiwan, Fengshan railway station, Taiwan Railway Jhenyi Chenching Station, Kaohsiung City Bus Main Station, Fongshan West MRT station, Weiwuying MRT station, Kaohsiung Interchange of Freeway 1, Weiwuying Metropolitan Park, National Kaohsiung Center for the Arts, therefore, it is within easy reach and a well-known high school in the Kaohsiung metropolitan area, which enrolls the number of students graduating from junior high schools that can constitute 18 classes per grade in each school year.

== Pets ==
There are presently many pets fed and raised in Fengshan Senior High School supported by a recently established club called Pet-serving aimed at taking care of those stray animals and Free-ranging dog who visit the school by chance.

List of the given names for the stray animals

- 白襪 (White Sox)
- 泡泡 (Bubble)
- 毛毛 (Mao Mao, literally full of fur)
- 爛爛 (Dirt)
- 花花 (Flower)
- 帥哥 (Handsome Guy)
- 拉屎 (Pooping)
- 妹妹 (Sister)
- 小布 (Pudding)

== Renowned alumni ==
- Hsueh Hsiang-chuan
- Hou Hsiao-hsien
- You Ching
- Tseng Yung-fu
- Yoga Lin
- Yao Jen-to

== See also ==
- National Fengshan Vocational High School
