= National FengHsin Senior High School =

National Feng-Hsin Senior High School 國立鳳新高級中學
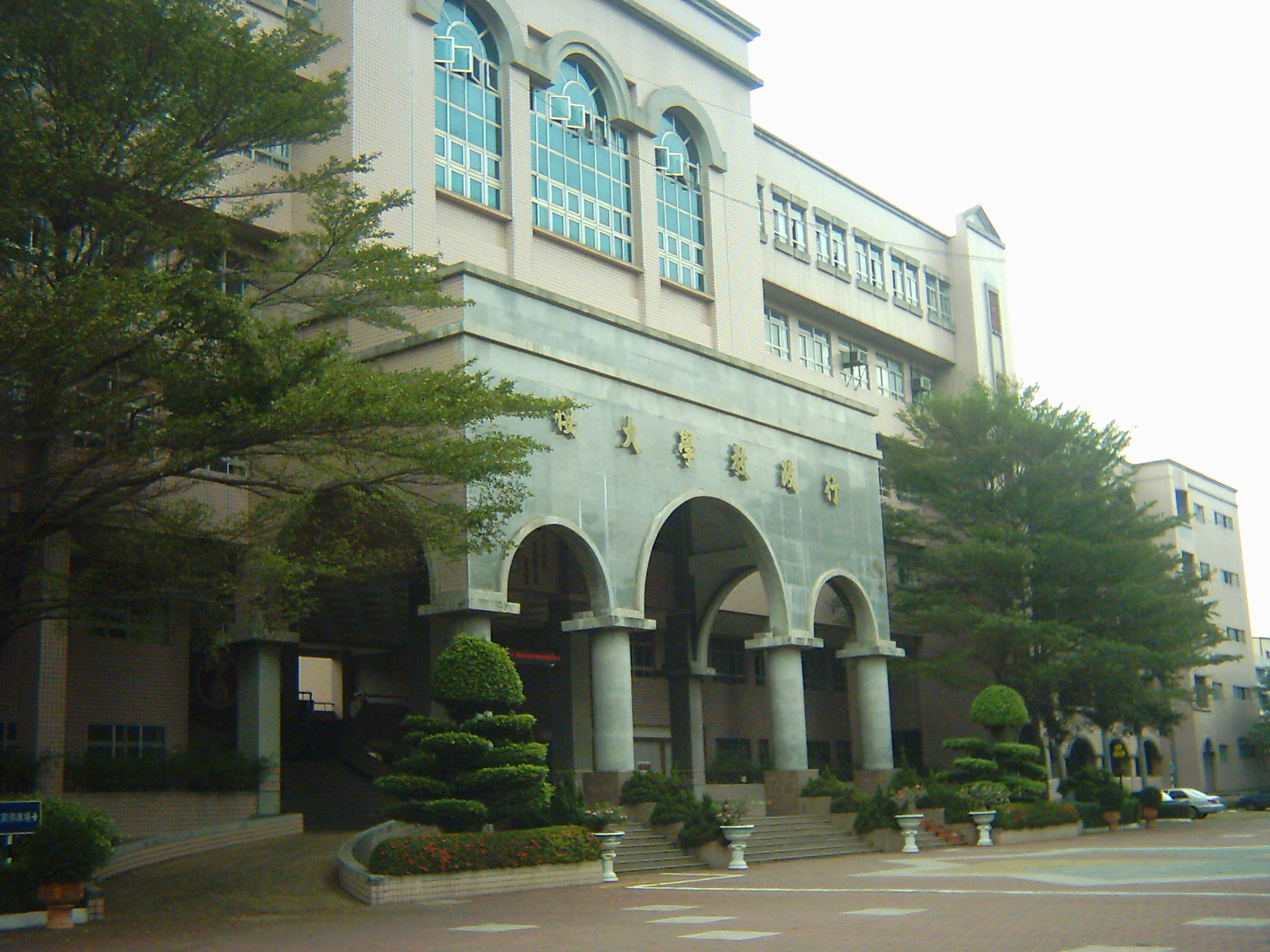

Location
- No. 257, Hsinfu Road, Fengshan District, Kaohsiung City
- Coordinates: 22.6138°N 120.3425°E

Information
- Other name: National Feng-Hsin Senior High School
- Type: NationalSenior high school
- Motto: Justice · Honesty · Openness · Perseverance (公誠宏毅)
- Established: 1992年臺灣省立鳳新高級中學; 2000年國立鳳新高級中學
- School district: Fengshan District, Kaohsiung City, Taiwan
- Principal: 黃再鴻
- Grades: Three grades (10-12)
- Enrollment: 2,100 persons (including featured music profession class & featured art profession class)
- Area: 6.5 hectares
- Campus environment: Urban area, Downtown Fengshan District, Kaohsiung City
- Website: www.fhsh.khc.edu.tw/

National Feng-Hsin Senior High School, alias Feng-Hsin Senior High School, abbreviated as FHSH is a high school located in southern Fengshan District, Kaohsiung City, Taiwan, established by the education ministry of Taiwan in order to satisfy the growing need of education in Kaohsiung City owing to soaring number of population in 1992. It has 19 classes for each grades comprising three special classes, namely musical class, art class, and mathematical and science centered class.

== See also ==
- National Fengshan Senior High School
