= Fongyi Tutorial Academy =

Former tutorial academy in Fongshan, Kaohsiung, Taiwan

Fongyi Tutorial Academy 鳳儀書院
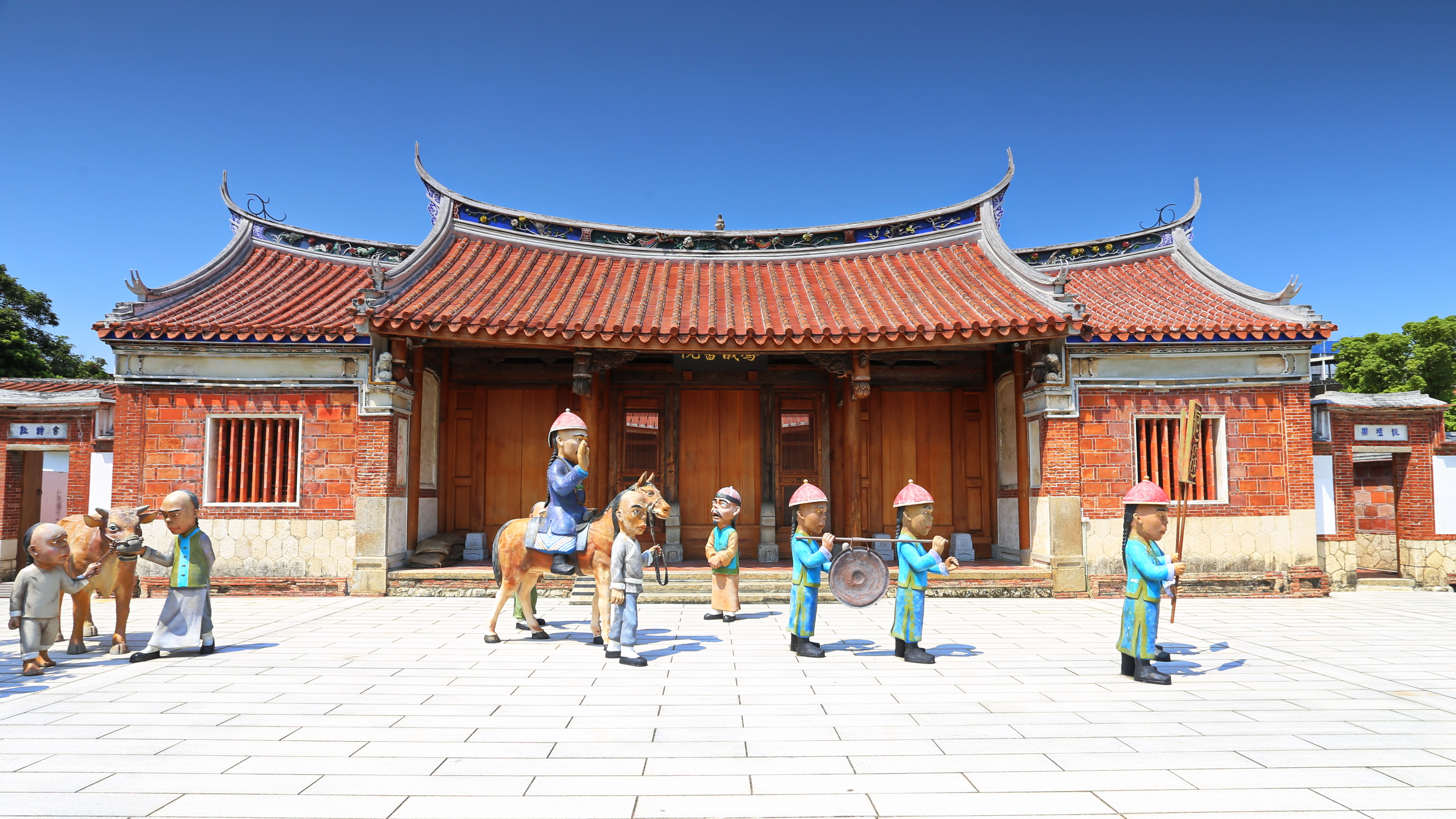

Location
- Fengshan, Kaohsiung, Taiwan
- Coordinates: 22°37′37.8″N 120°21′33.4″E

Information
- Type: former academy
- Established: 1814

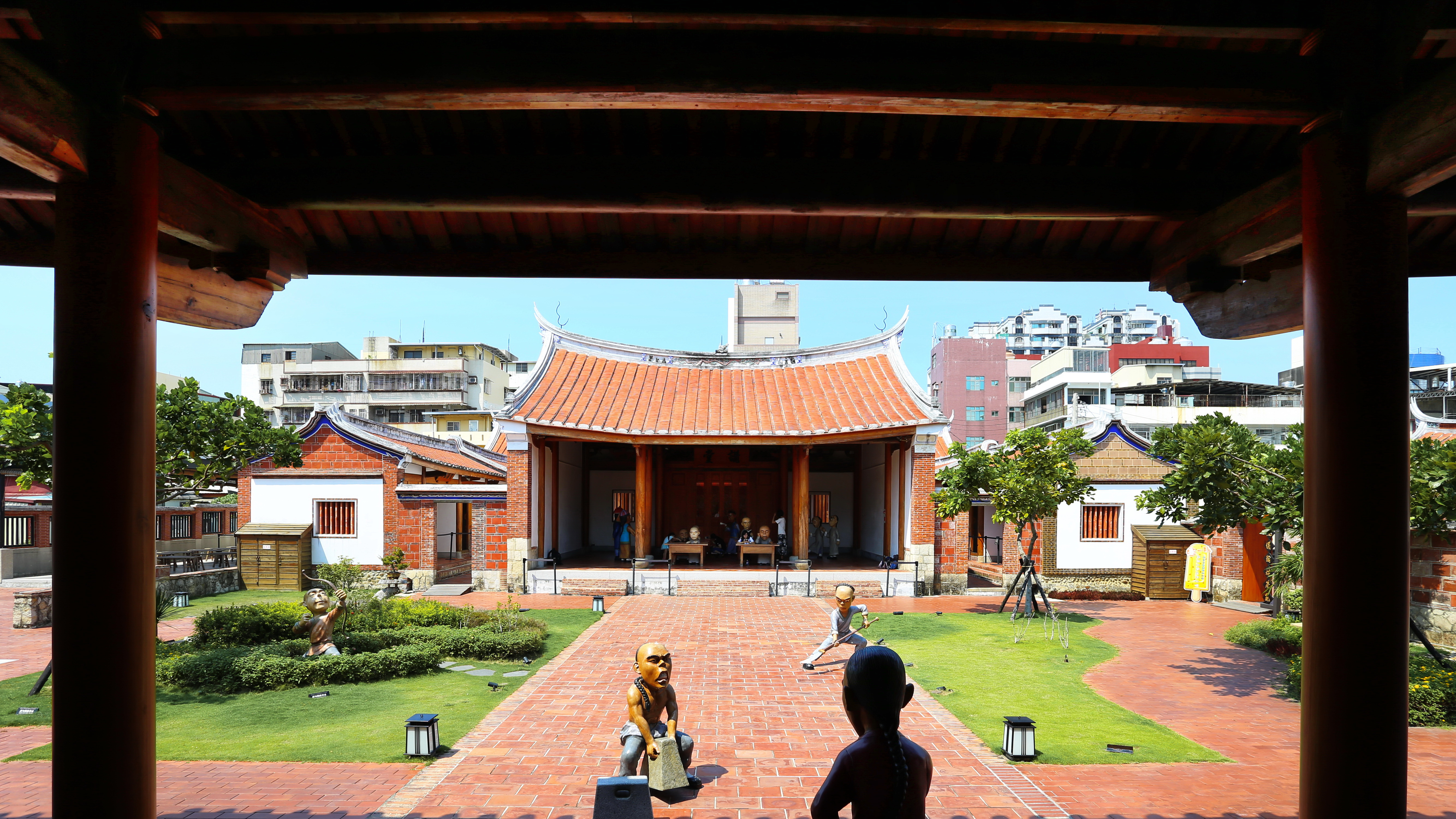
Courtyard of the Fongyi Tutorial Academy

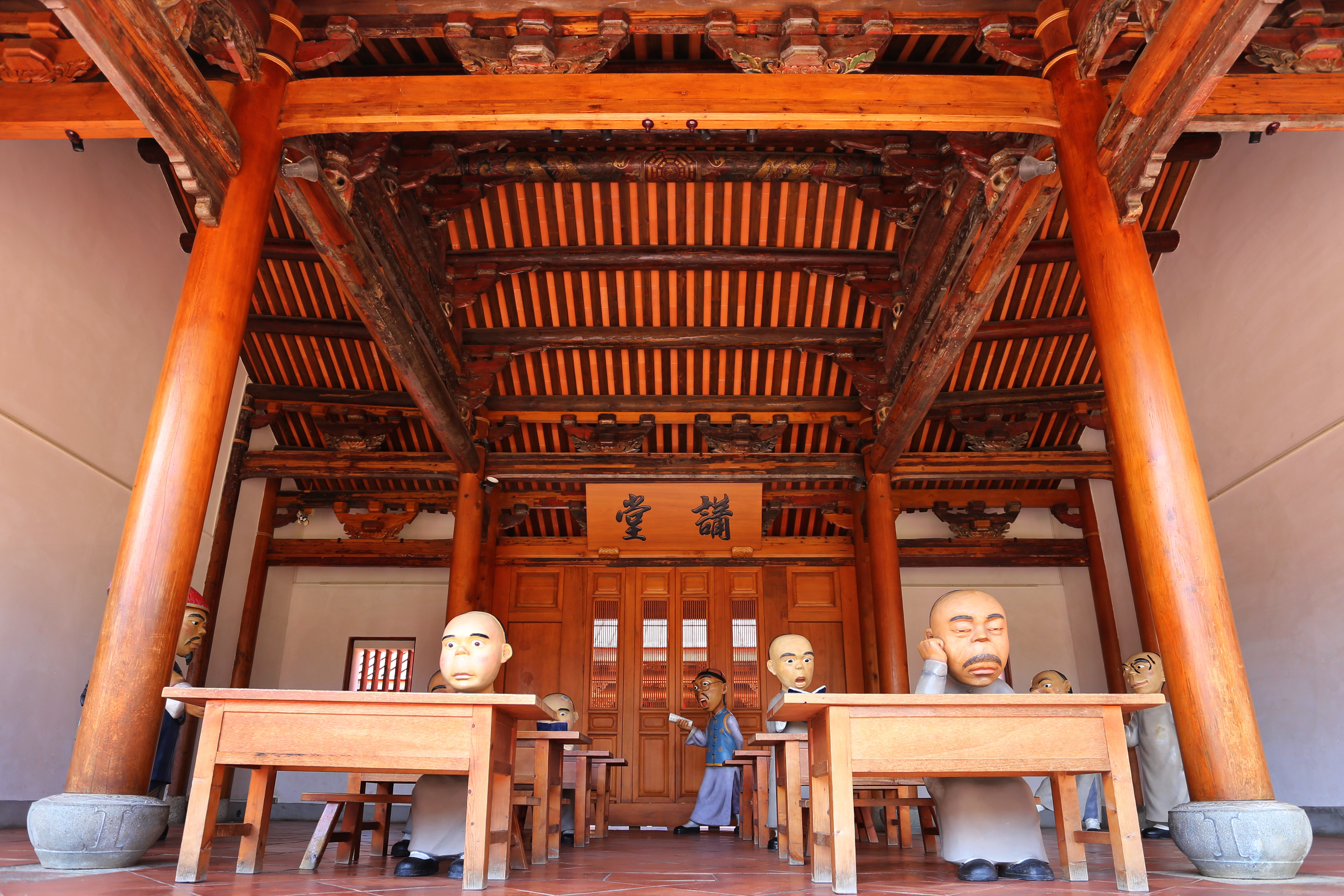
A classroom of the Fongyi Tutorial Academy

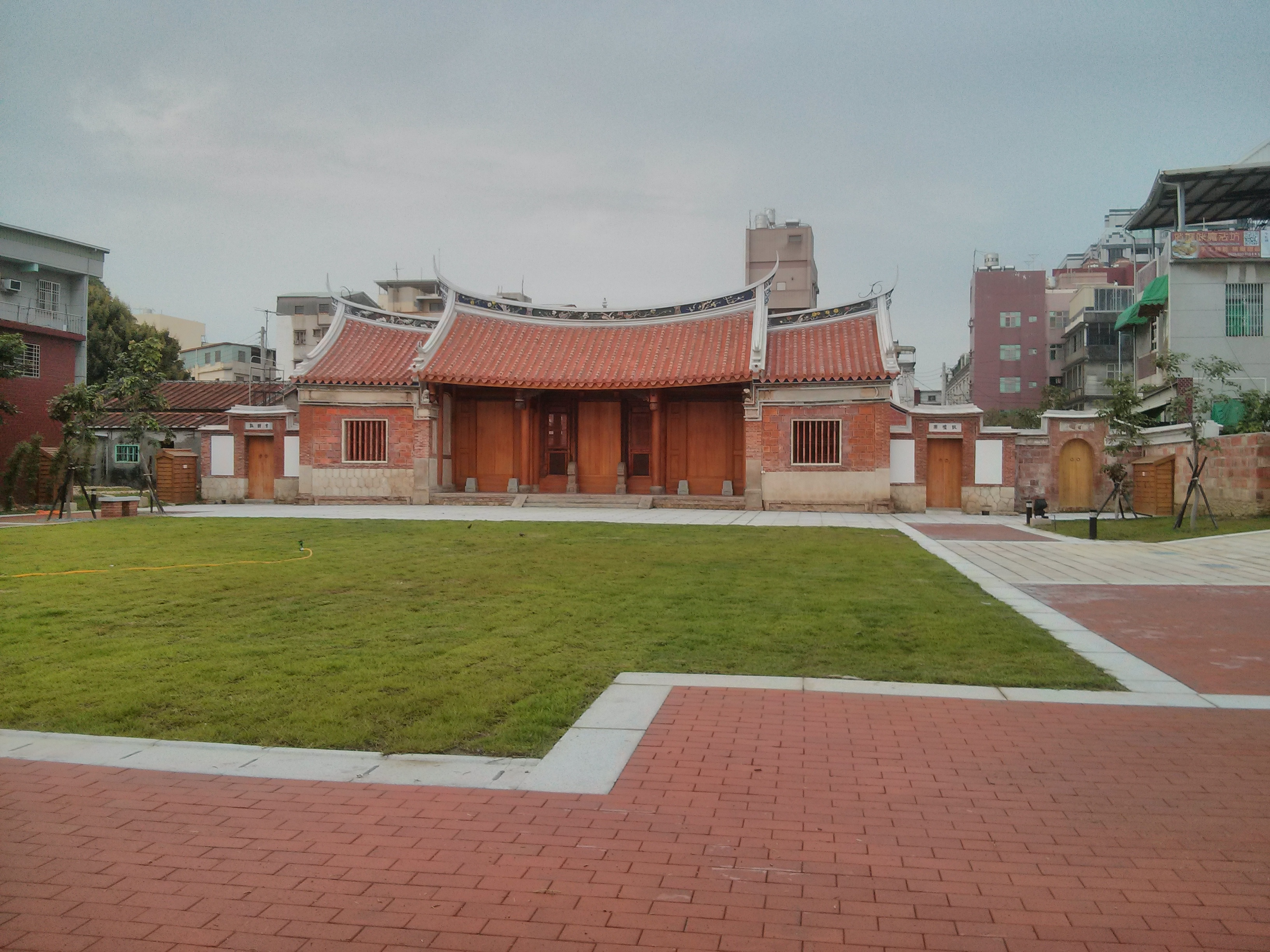
Fongyi Tutorial Academy

The Fongyi Tutorial Academy (traditional Chinese: 鳳儀書院; simplified Chinese: 凤仪书院; pinyin: Fèngyí Shūyuàn) is a former tutorial academy during the Qing Dynasty rule of Taiwan in Fengshan District, Kaohsiung, Taiwan. It is the largest preserved Confucian academy in Taiwan.

== History ==
The building was built by Jhang Ting-cing in 1814 during Jiaqing Emperor rule. It was the venue for candidates to take the imperial examination. On 13 November 1985, the building was designated as level 3 historical monument. In 2007, the Kaohsiung City Government acquired the land title of the academy and restoration to the building commenced with a total budget of NT$100 million.

== Architecture ==
The building was built using traditional Chinese style with wooden carving and tablets inscribed with phrases describing good manners. It consists of 37 rooms with the center altar dedicated to Wenchang Buddha, Kuichang Buddha and Changsheng Buddha. There are stone drum on both sides of the screen wall. The garden consists of many animated statues.

== Transportation ==
The building is accessible within walking distance east from Fongshan Station of Kaohsiung Metro.

== See also ==
- List of tourist attractions in Taiwan
- Pingtung Tutorial Academy
