= Zhonghua Street Night Market =

Night market in Fengshan, Kaohsiung, Taiwan

Zhonghua Street Night Market 中華街觀光夜市
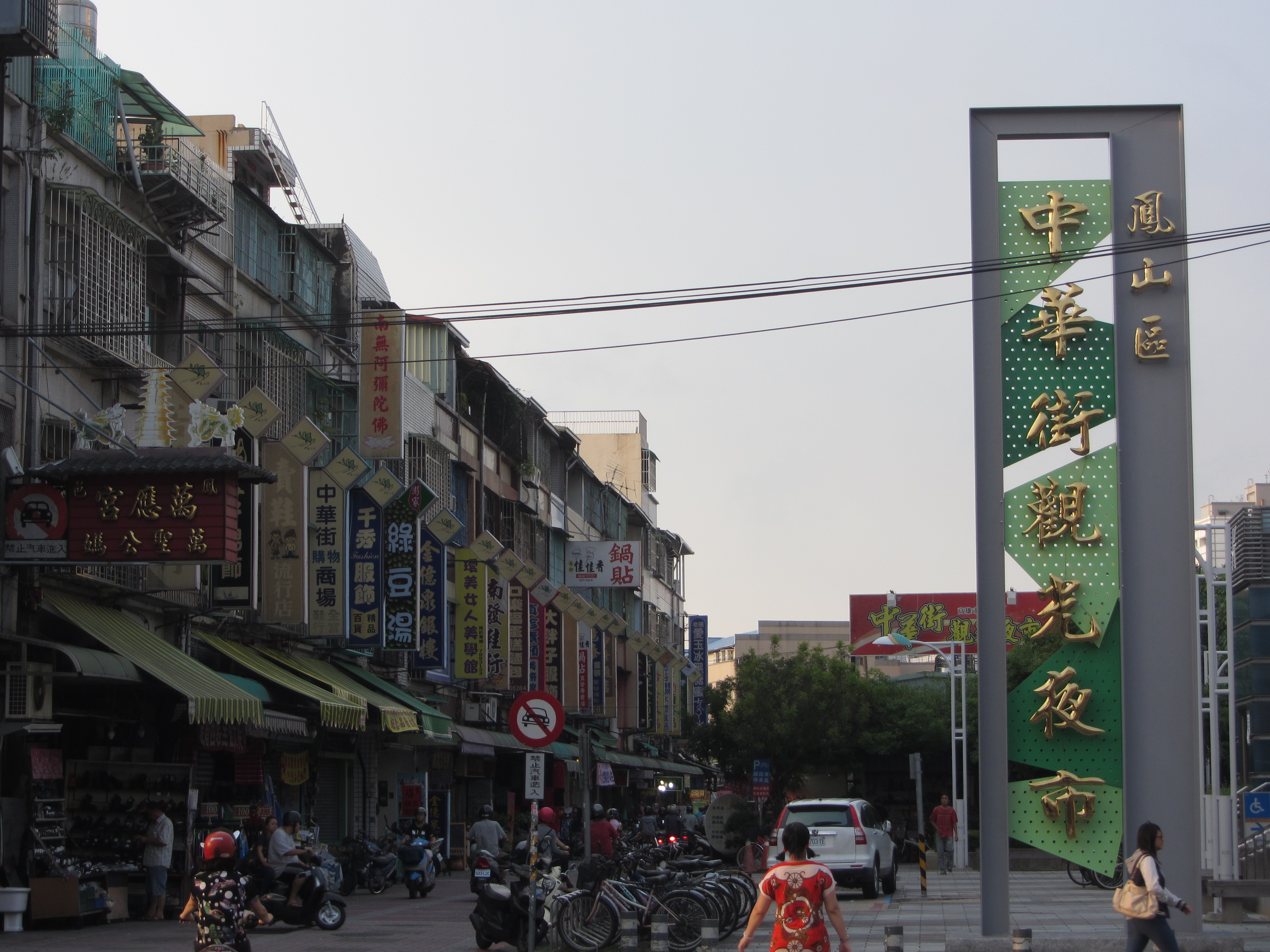
- Location: Fengshan, Kaohsiung, Taiwan; 22°37′36.4″N 120°21′21.4″E
- Opening date: 1950s
- Architect: night market
- Interactive map of Zhonghua Street Night Market

The Zhonghua Street Night Market (traditional Chinese: 中華街觀光夜市; simplified Chinese: 中华街观光夜市; pinyin: Zhōnghuá Jiē Guānguāng Yèshì) is a night market in Fengshan District, Kaohsiung, Taiwan.

== History ==
The night market opened in the 1950s. In 1965, the Kaohsiung County Government officially set up the area to be a night market.

== Architecture ==
The night market is located at the intersection of Zhongshan Street and Guangyuan Road on a 3 km (1.9 mi) long street with more than 500 food stalls. Many delicacies such as fig jelly, salted crispy chicken, chicken rice, beef noodles and herb tea can be found in the night market. It also has cultural interests and temples.

== Transportation ==
The night market is accessible by walking about 100m (350ft) north of exit 2 of the Fongshan Station of the Kaohsiung MRT.

== See also ==
- Night markets in Taiwan
- List of night markets in Taiwan
