= Fongshan Stadium =

Stadium in Fengshan, Kaohsiung, Taiwan

- 高雄市立鳳山體育場
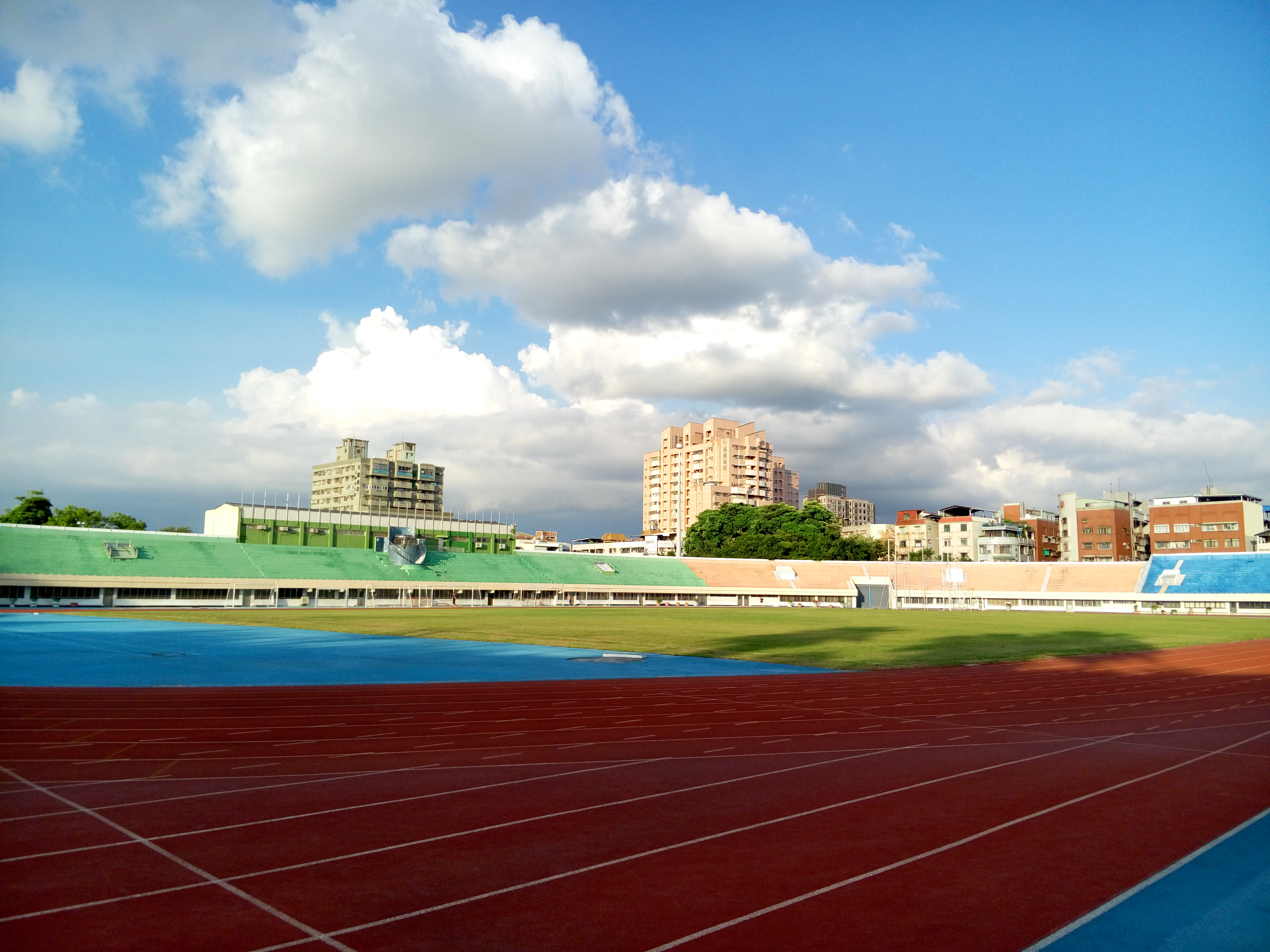
- Interactive map of Fongshan Stadium
- Former names: Kaohsiung County Stadium
- Address: No. 65, Tiyu Road, Fengshan District, Kaohsiung City
- Location: Fongshan, Kaohsiung, Taiwan
- Coordinates: 22°37′18.5″N 120°21′16.2″E
- Capacity: 18,000
- Type: stadium
- Public transit: Fongshan Station

Construction
- Opened: 1976
- Renovated: 2017

The Fongshan Stadium (Chinese: 高雄市立鳳山體育場; pinyin: Gāoxióng Shìlì Fèngshān Tǐyùchǎng), formerly known as the Kaohsiung County Stadium (Chinese: 高雄縣立體育場), is a multi-purpose stadium in Fongshan District, Kaohsiung, Taiwan.

== Construction ==
It is part of the Fengshan Sports Park, which includes the indoor Fengshan Arena, Fongshan Stadium football pitch, running track, ice rink, Fengxi Sports Park, tennis courts and other sporting facilities. The sports complex underwent significant renovations in 2017. The football pitch is currently used mostly for football matches and serves as the home venue of the Taipower Football Club. The indoor arena is mostly for volleyball and basketball and serves as the home of the Kaohsung 17LIVE Steelers. The stadium is able to hold 18,000 people and was opened in 1976.

== Transportation ==
The stadium is accessible by walking about 700m (2300ft) South of exit 1 of the Fongshan Station of the Kaohsiung MRT.

== See also ==
- Fengshan Arena
- List of stadiums in Taiwan
- Sports in Taiwan
