= Fongshan Community Culture Museum =

Museum in Fengshan, Kaohsiung, Taiwan

- 鳳山地方文化館
- Former name: Fengshan District Health Office's Youth Branch
- Established: 19 February 2006
- Location: Fengshan, Kaohsiung, Taiwan
- Coordinates: 22°37′48.2″N 120°20′56.1″E
- Type: community museum
- Public transit access: Fongshan West–City Council Station

The Fongshan Community Culture Museum (traditional Chinese: 鳳山地方文化館; simplified Chinese: 凤山地方文化馆; pinyin: Fèngshān Dìfāng Wénhuàguǎn) is a community museum in Fengshan District, Kaohsiung, Taiwan.

== History ==
The museum building was originally the Fengshan District Health Office's Youth Branch. After the health office moved to a new building, the building was left idle. In 2001, Fongshan Mayor Lin San-lang instructed the renovation of the building into a museum. The construction of the museum cost more than NT$4 million, in which NT$3 million was subsidized by the Council of Cultural Affairs and the remaining by Fengshan District Office. The museum was finally inaugurated on 19 February 2006.

== Architecture ==
The museum is a two-story building with a total floor area of 200 m^{2}.

== Exhibition ==
The ground floor of the museum displays the history of Blacksmith Street and Cishan rice cake. The upper floor displays the stone carving and arts as well as classroom. The outdoor area displays the stone carving learning place.

== Events ==
The museum regularly holds various events, such as old photos exhibitions, rice cake and pottery making, leisure activities for residents etc.

== Transportation ==
The museum is accessible within walking distance north of Fongshan West Station of Kaohsiung Metro.

== See also ==
- List of museums in Taiwan
