= National FongShan Senior Commercial & Industrial Vocational School =

National vocational high school in Fengshan, Kaohsiung, Taiwan

National Fongshan Senior Commercial & Industrial Vocational School 國立鳳山高級商工職業學校

Location
- No.51, Wenhen Road, Fengshan, Kaohsiung, Taiwan
- Coordinates: 22°38′03″N 120°21′28″E

Information
- Former name: Taiwan Prefecture Kaohsiung Commercial Vocational High School-Fengshan Branch. (1956); Taiwan Prefecture Fengshan Commercial Vocational High School (1965); National Fengshan Commercial Vocational High School (1981-)
- Type: National vocational high school
- Motto: Stable, Mediocre and Honest (平實穩健)
- Established: 1956
- Principal: 鄭越庭
- Staff: 160+ persons
- Enrollment: near 3000 persons
- Classes: 77
- Area: 69.971m²（approximately 7 hectares）
- Publication: Youth FSVS (鳳商青年)
- Website: http://www.fsvs.ks.edu.tw/

National Fongshan Senior Commercial & Industrial Vocational School (FSVS) is a vocational high school in Taiwan with departments ranging from machine, design to business management. It also opens PE departments and comprehensive vocational department. There are currently eight departments that make up sixty five classes in the day time and twelve others in the night time, both sum up nearly 3000 registered students.

== See also ==
- National Fengshan Senior High School
