= LGBTQ history in Taiwan =

The major religions in Taiwan are Buddhism and Taoism. In these religions, the beliefs present no arguable issues about LGBTQ people. There are no laws about punishing sodomy, which means a sexual relationship between males is not considered an abomination, unlike in many western and Abrahamic religions. However, it was long considered a taboo issue. When human rights issues were discussed in political arenas, the concept of Tongzhi (Chinese: 同志; lit. 'Comrade (communist sense)', 'homosexual') became a key term among the politicians in Taiwan. When it emerged in political forums, Taiwanese people began to become familiar with the idea that Tongzhi people being a part of their culture. Yet still, LGBTQ people were not mentioned in Taiwanese law. Punishment for being part of the LGBTQ community did not exist, yet there was also not any welfare or protection for LGBTQ people.

Beginning in the 1990s, the movements of the human rights for LGBTQ in Taiwan gained traction. Since the movement emerged, Taiwan has been considered one of the most LGBTQ friendly nations in Asia. There is a large gay community and the biggest Pride Parade in Asia is held annually in Taipei. On 25 May 2017, the Supreme Court issued a long-awaited ruling on the laws banning same-sex marriage. They ruled that such laws were unconstitutional. This was a massive breakthrough for the fight for equality, as it requires the Parliament to amend the laws within two years. In 2019, same-sex marriage was fully legalized. In some cities a same sex partnership card for LGBTQ couples is issued to prove their relationship in case of emergency. LGBTQ discrimination is now banned in workplaces and schools. In addition, people can legally change their gender. Taiwan's first female president was elected in May 2016, Tsai Ing-wen, and officially supports the rights of the LGBT people. She worked to put the processes that legalized same-sex marriage into motion, and once said she desired that Taiwan become the first country in the Asia to allow same-sex marriage. Overall, Taiwan has a progressive history of LGBTQ.

== Timeline of LGBT history in Taiwan ==
- 1683: The Qing dynasty annexes Taiwan.
- 1740: Anti-homosexual decrees were promulgated.
- 1895: Qing China ceded Taiwan to the Japanese Empire. Meiji laws applied.
- 1912: The Republic of China is established. Ji jian was abolished.
- 1945: Taiwan is returned to the Republic of China by the Japanese.
- 1949: The People's Republic of China is established and the Nationalist government of the Republic of China retreats to Taiwan. There was no mention in the laws about queer people.
- 1983: the first queer novel, Crystal Boys, was published in Chinese as "Niezi" which means Evil Sons. The author of the book is Pai Hsien-yung, he described the gay history of 1970s in this book. Crystal Boys has been famous for being a well-organized piece of literature regarding gay history, and for its illustration of the 1970s’ subterranean homosexual prostitution minor culture based in the New Park in downtown Taipei. However, as the following examples demonstrates, it has been a site of identification for a new style of "Tongzhi(Queer)" awareness.
- 1990: The first lesbian group, Between Us, was established.
- 1996: a Taiwanese writer Hsu Yu-sheng and his American partner Gray Harriman had the first public same-sex wedding in Taiwan.
- 1998: the Taiwan Tongzhi Hotline Association, a legally registered LGBTQ organisation, was founded.
- 2002: Taiwanese gay rights activists were invited by the then president of the Republic of China (Taiwan), Chen Shui-Bian, to the presidential office.
- 2003: Vice-president and convener of the government's human rights commission (Annette Lu Hsiu-lien) drafted a basic human rights law that included an article on same-sex marriage and adoption rights for same-sex couples. It was discussed in the cabinet, but due to the elections in 2004 and a change in the government, it was not passed. The first pride parade was held, and was sponsored by the government.
- 2004: The second pride parade was funded by community groups.
- 2005:, a same-sex marriage bill was submitted by Hsiao Bi-khim, who is a lawmaker from the Democratic Progressive Party. However, it was rejected.
- 2006: There was the second public wedding between gay rights activist Nelson Chen and his partner Kao Chih-Wei.
- 2010: a third gay couple had a public wedding.
- 2012: The first lesbian couple had a public wedding with the blessing of monks.
- 2013: There was a poll about the same-sex marriage legislation. The results showed that more than half of the people in the survey supported same-sex marriage.
- 2016: Same-sex marriage was in the process of being legalized. Once this was announced, a lot of people, especially from Catholic groups with significant influence began to protest and speak out against the process in front of the Legislative Yuan.
- January 2016, Tsai Ing-wen won the presidential election and became the first female president of the Republic of China (Taiwan). Tsai and her party, the Democratic Progressive Party, supports LGBTQ rights.
- 29 October 2016: The biggest LGBT Pride Parade in Asia (to date) was held in Taipei. This march gathered around 80,000 people from Taiwan and around Asia. The participants of the parade rallied for the legalization of same-sex marriage in Taiwan.
- 20 May 2016: The city of Kaohsiung issued the first same-sex partnership card to the young lesbian couple, Yang Ying-fan (陳盈汎) and Wu Yu-ting (吳羽婷). This card is an official ID card and it has the basic personal information of two people's name, birth dates, and birthplace. This card however does not have legal binding force; but it can be used to verify the relationship between a same sex couple. It can be used in the case of an emergency in medical institutions
- 3 December 2016: Tens of thousands of opponents of same-sex marriage demonstrated in Taipei, Taichung and Kaohsiung.
- 25 May 2017: The Supreme Court of the Republic of China ruled that laws preventing same-sex couples from marrying were unconstitutional. They required the Legislative Yuan to pass and enact new laws amending the issue within two years. The court also ruled that if they were to fail to amend the marriage laws within two years, same-sex couples will be able to register their marriage by going through current marriage registration processes at any household registration office.
- 24 November 2018: More than 70% of Taiwanese voters voted against same-sex marriage.
- 17 May 2019: Same-sex marriage was legalized in Taiwan and became effective since 24 May 2019, including rights in areas such as taxes, insurance and child custody.
- 16 May 2023: the Legislative Yuan approved the joint adoption bill, the 2019 bill allowed same-sex couples only adopt the biological child of their same-sex partner (stepchild adoptions).
- 2024: Huang Jie became the first openly LGBT candidate to be elected to the Legislative Yuan.
- 3 October 2026: Taiwanese police raided a gay bar, detaining dozens of gay people on charges of obscenity and offences against morality. Detainees reportedly experienced excessive force, humiliating treatment, interrogation, and homophobic remarks.
