= Kaohsiung City Council =

Legislature of Kaohsiung City, Taiwan

Coordinates: 22°37′17″N 120°20′51″E

Kaohsiung City Council 高雄市議會
- 4th Kaohsiung City Council

Type
- Type: City council

History
- Founded: 25 December 2010
- Preceded by: Provisional Kaohsiung City Council; Kaohsiung County Council

Leadership
- Speaker: Kang Yu-Cheng (DPP)
- Deputy Speaker: Tsung Chun-Chien (Independent)

Structure
- Seats: 65
- Political groups: KMT (28); DPP (27); NPSU (3); TSU (1); TSP (1); Independent (4); Vacant (1)
- Length of term: 4 years

Elections
- Voting system: Single non-transferable vote
- First election: 27 November 2010
- Last election: 24 November 2022

Meeting place
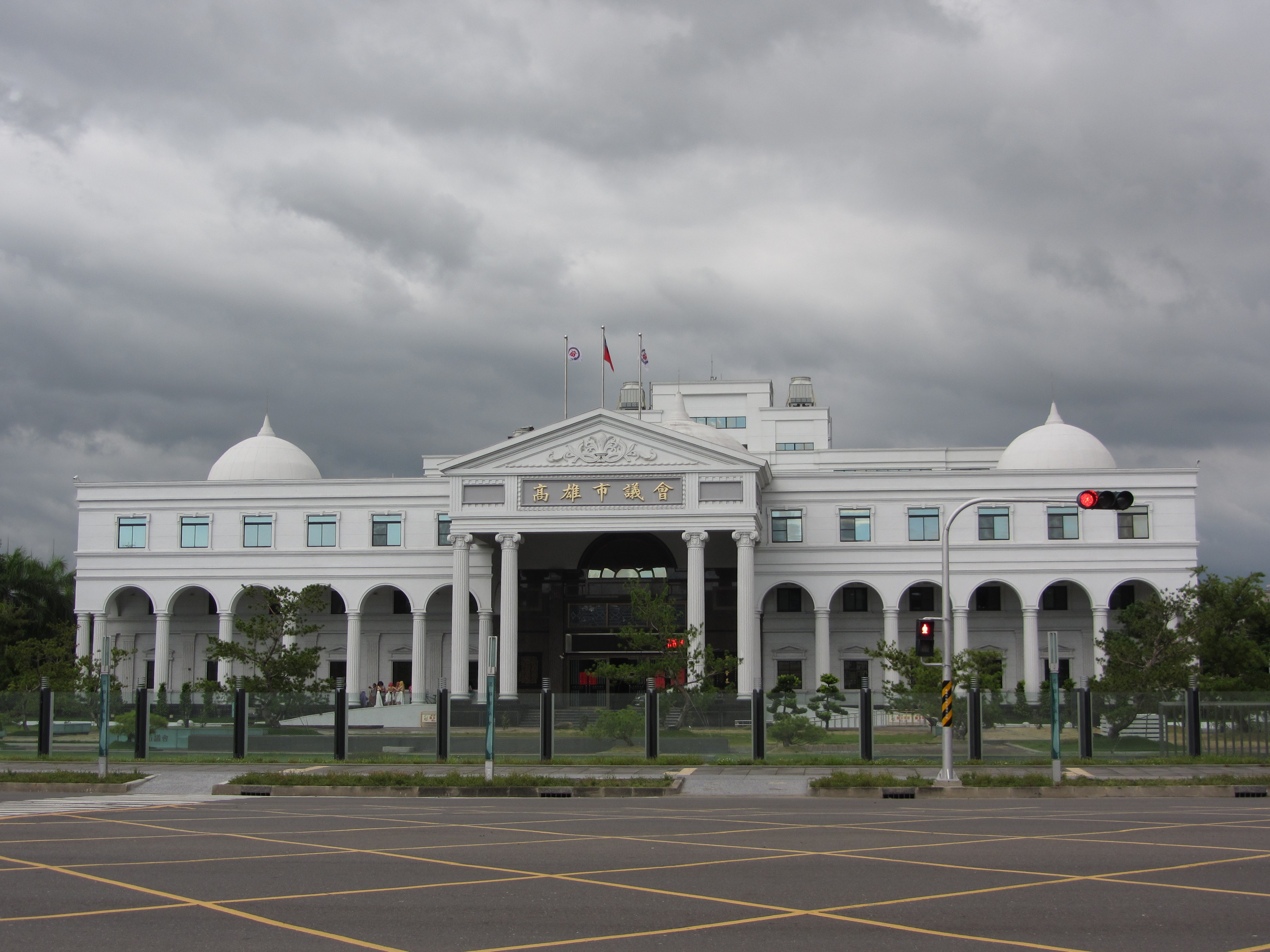
- No. 156, Sec. 2, Guotai Road, Fengshan District, Kaohsiung 830, Taiwan

Website
- www.kcc.gov.tw

Constitution
- Constitution of the Republic of China

The Kaohsiung City Council (Chinese: 高雄市議會; pinyin: Gāoxióng Shì Yìhuì) is the city council of Kaohsiung City, Republic of China. It is currently composed of 65 councilors, each serving a four-year term, elected using the single non-transferable vote system. The speaker and deputy speaker of the council are elected by fellow councilors through a secret ballot. Kaohsiung residents, aged 23 or above and having resided in the city for more than four months, are eligible to cast their votes or run in the municipal election. Along with the New Taipei City Council, the city council is the largest Taiwanese local council in terms of seats.

== History ==
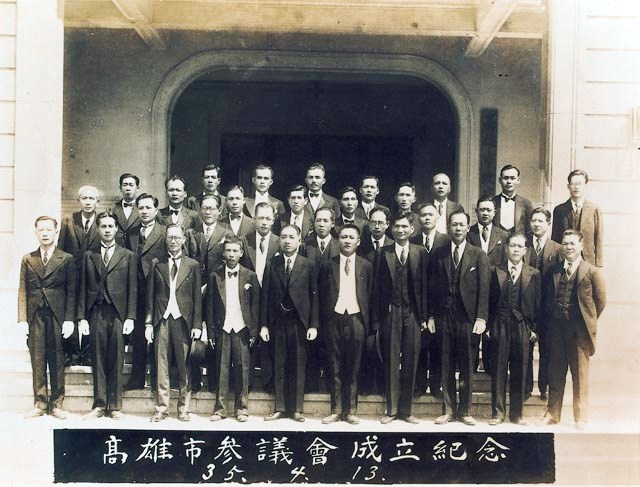
Establishment of Kaohsiung City Senate in 1946

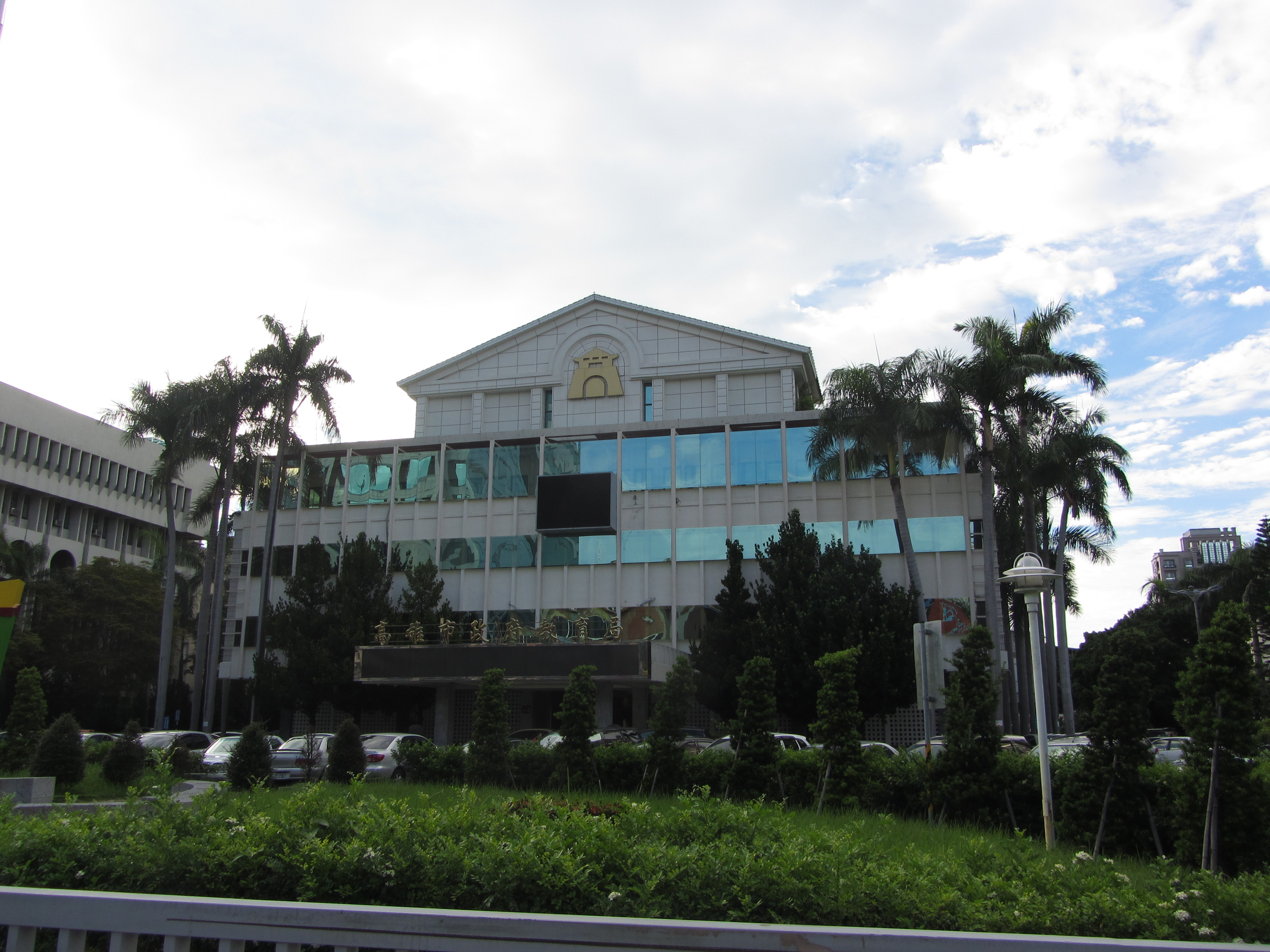
Former building of Kaohsiung City Council

The present Kaohsiung City Council was established on 25 December 2010 following merger with the Kaohsiung County Council.

=== Provisional Kaohsiung City Council ===
Succeeding the 40-member Kaohsiung City Senate on 11 January 1951, the Kaohsiung City Council, having 28 seats, was formed after Kaohsiung was designated a provincial city. Between the period of 1951 and 1979, the council seats had nearly doubled, while councillors had their term extended to 4 years. The city council, entering the transition period following Kaohsiung was promoted to a special municipality, was reorganized into the Provisional Kaohsiung City Council on 1 July 1979, with three new seats were added to the provisional city council. A successive Kaohsiung City Council, replacing the provisional city council, was founded on 25 December 1981 when the transition period ended.

=== Kaohsiung County Council ===
After the retrocession of Taiwan and the ensuing devolution, 56 candidates were elected to the Kaohsiung County Senate upon the indirect election held on 15 March 1946. The Government announced in 1950 the reorganization of local governments, including partition of Kaohsiung County and Pingtung County, thus paving way for further devolution in Taiwan. The 48-member Kaohsiung County Council, succeeding the county senate, was established on 11 January 1951 after the local elections held on 17 December 1950.

== Transportation ==
The council building is accessible within walking distance of Fongshan West–City Council metro station.

== Councilors ==
District 1

- Hsin-Chiang Chu
- Fu-Bao Lin
- Yi-Di Lin

District 2

- Ming-Ze Chen
- Ming-Tai Huang
- Ya-Chu Li

District 3

- Xin-Yuan Fang
- Min-Lin Gao
- Chiu-Ying Huang
- Shu-Mei Li
- Li-Pin Sung

District 4

- Li-Chen Chen
- Mei-Jyuan Chen
- Mei-Jhen Li
- Ya-Hui Li
- Ya-Fen Li
- Bo-Yi Li
- Shan-Hui Chen
- Wen-Chih Huang

District 5

District 6

District 7

District 8

District 9

- Huang Jie

District 10

District 11

District 12

District 13

District 14

District 15

- Hui-Mei Tang

== See also ==
- Mayor of Kaohsiung
- List of county magistrates of Kaohsiung
- Kaohsiung City Government
