= Fongshan metro station =

Metro station in Fengshan, Kaohsiung, Taiwan

Fongshan O12 鳳山
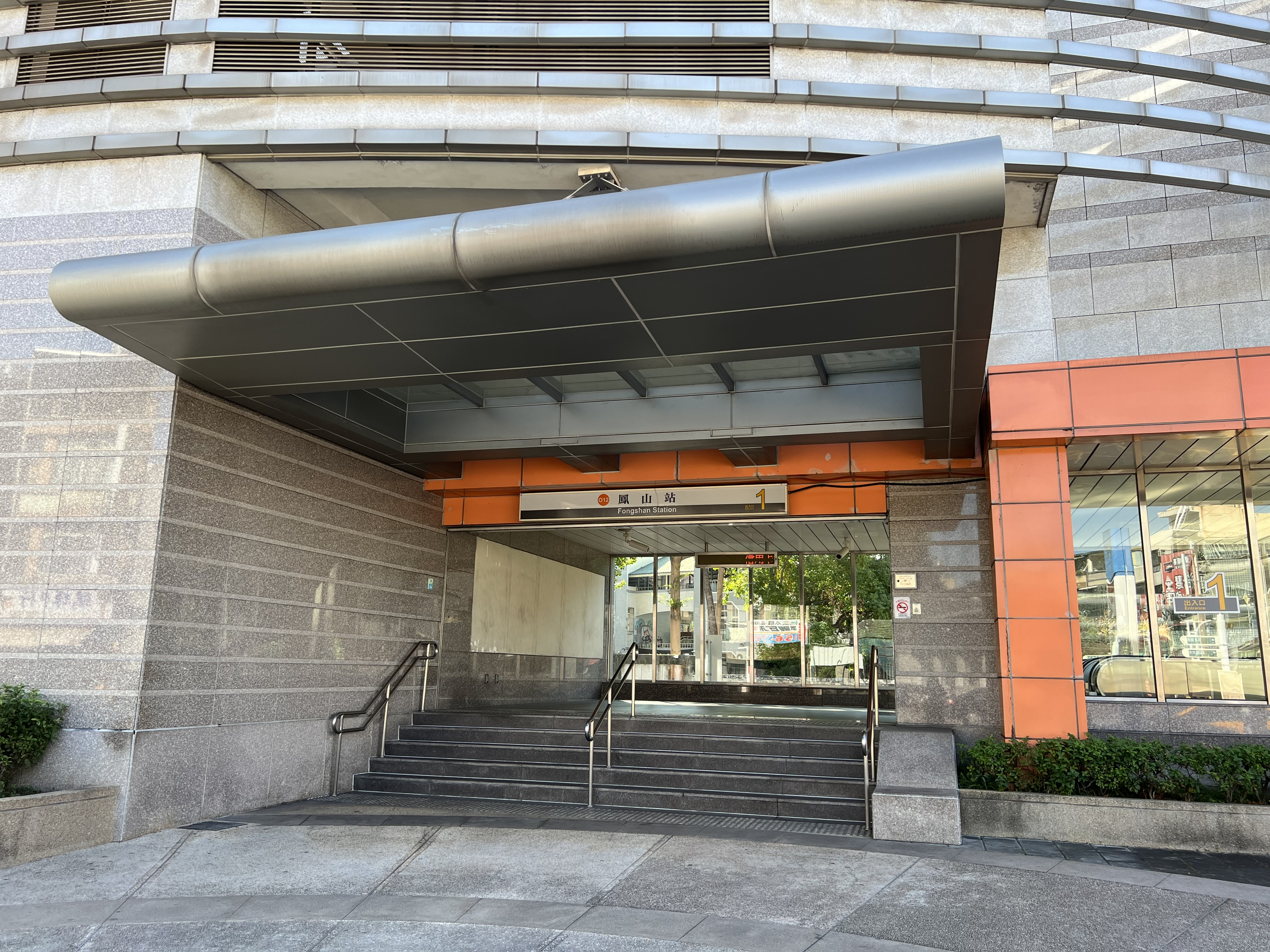
- Exit 1 of Fongshan station

General information
- Location: Fongshan, Kaohsiung; Taiwan
- Coordinates: 22°37′34″N 120°21′21″E
- Operated by: Kaohsiung Rapid Transit Corporation
- Line: Orange line (O12)
- Platforms: One island platform
- Connections: Bus stop

Construction
- Structure type: Underground
- Accessible: Yes

History
- Opened: 2008-09-14

Passengers
- 3,541 daily (Jan. 2011)

Services
| Preceding station | Kaohsiung Metro | Following station |
|---|---|---|
| Fongshan West–City Council towards Hamasen | Orange line | Dadong towards Daliao |
Location

Fongshan metro station
- Traditional Chinese: 鳳山車站
Transcriptions
Standard Mandarin
- Hanyu Pinyin: Fèngshān Chēzhàn
- Bopomofo: ㄈㄥˋ ㄕㄢ ㄔㄜ ㄓㄢˋ
- Wade–Giles: Fêng^{4}-shan^{1} Ch'ê^{1}-chan^{4}
- Tongyong Pinyin: Fòngshan Chejhàn

Fongshan is a station on the Orange line of the Kaohsiung MRT in Fongshan District, Kaohsiung, Taiwan. Itislocated in the historical centre of Fongshan. The MRT station's location is about 700 meters from the Taiwan Railway Administration Fengshan Station.

== Station overview ==
Thisis a two-level, underground station with an island platform and two exits. The station is 190 metres long and is located at the intersection of Fongshan Zihyou Rd., Jhongshan West Rd. and Jhongshan Rd.

=== Station layout ===
| Street level | Entrance/exit | Entrance/exit |
| B1 | Concourse | Lobby, information desk, automatic ticket machines, one-way faregates, restrooms (near exits 2) |
| B2 | Platform 1 | ← KMRT Orange line toward Hamasen (Fongshan West) |
| B2 | Island platform, doors will open on the left |
| B2 | Platform 2 | KMRT Orange line toward Daliao (Dadong) → |

=== Exits ===
- Exit 1: Fongshan Elementary School, Chenglan Fort
- Exit 2: Caogong Elementary School, Fongyi Tutorial Academy, Zhonghua Street Night Market

== Around the station ==
- Fengshan Stadium
- Fengshan railway station (about 700 meters or 2300 feet to the northeast)
- Fengxi Sports Park
- Fongyi Tutorial Academy
- Zhonghua Street Night Market
- Caogong Temple
- Fengyi Kaizhang Sacred King Temple (鳳邑開漳聖王廟)
- Chenglan Fort
- Pingcheng Fort
- Caogong Elementary School
- Fongshan Elementary School
- Fongsi Junior High School
- Fongshan Flying Square

== Future plan ==
Because the MRT station's location is about 700 meters from the Taiwan Railway Administration Fengshan Station, some councilors have urged the authorities concerned to find ways such as a corridor or another MRT line to link two stations.
