= Fongshan railway station =

Railway station in Fengshan, Kaohsiung, Taiwan

Fongshan 鳳山
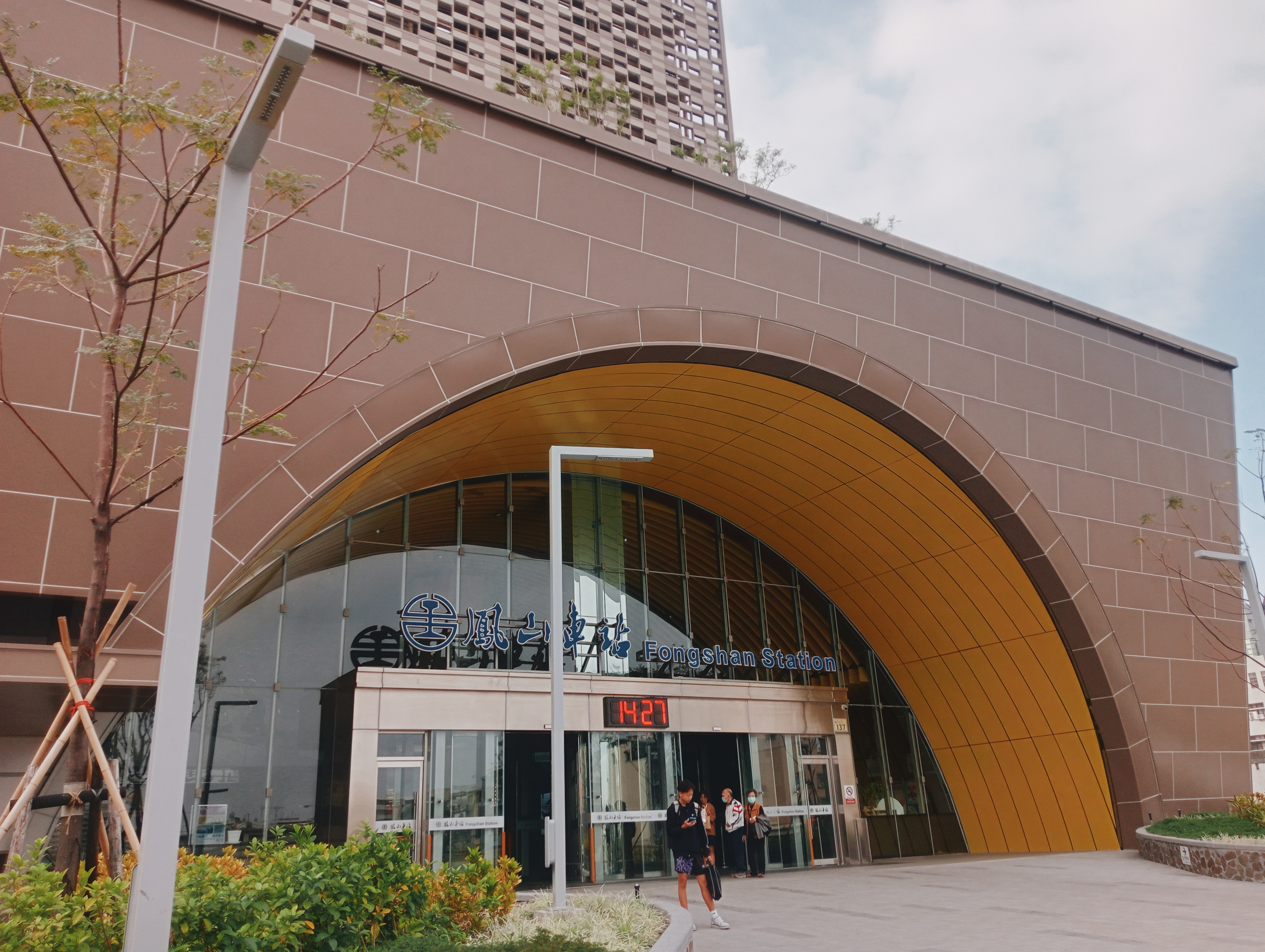

General information
- Location: Caogong Rd, No. 68; Fongshan, Kaohsiung, Taiwan
- Coordinates: 22.631431°N 120.357658°E
- Operator: Taiwan Railway Corporation
- Line: Pingtung line
- Distance: 5.8 km from Kaohsiung
- Platforms: 2 island
- Tracks: 3

Construction
- Structure type: Underground
- Accessible: Yes

Other information
- Classification: 二等站 (Taiwan Railways Administration level)

History
- Opened: 1 October 1907; 118 years ago
- Rebuilt: 14 October 2018; 7 years ago
Location

Fongshan (Note: The Title Fongshan is installed on templates of the rail station sign now according to the Google Street View, the Pinyin version Fengshan is on the TRA English website.) station (Chinese: 鳳山車站; Hanyu Pinyin: Fèngshān Chēzhàn; Tongyong Pinyin: Fòngshān Chejhàn), is a railway station on Taiwan Railway Pingtung line located in Fongshan District, Kaohsiung City, Taiwan.

The station is located about 700 meters, or 2300 feet northeast of the Kaohsiung MRT Fongshan Station.

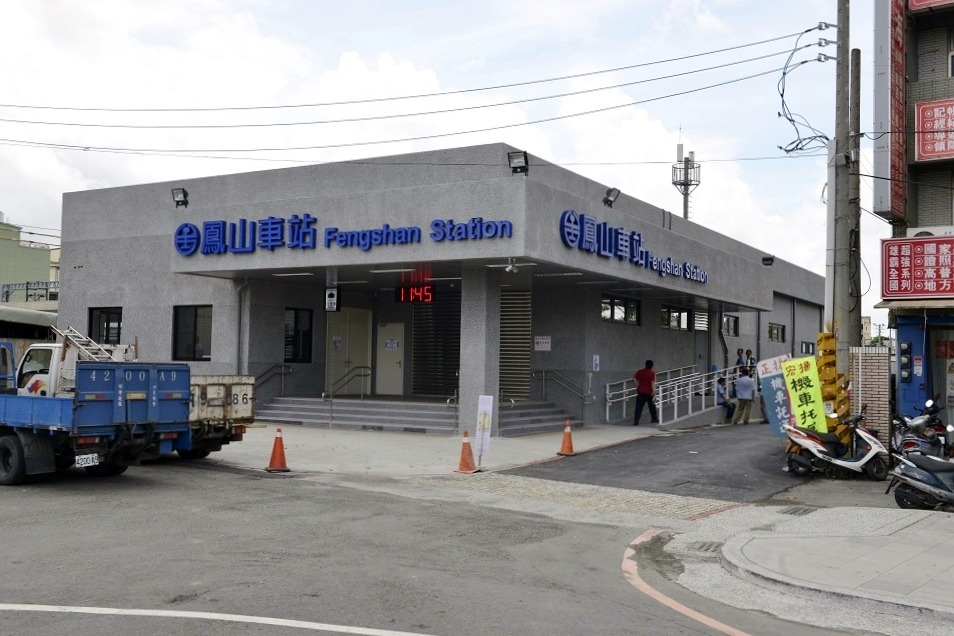
The temporary station during the construction of the new station building

== History ==
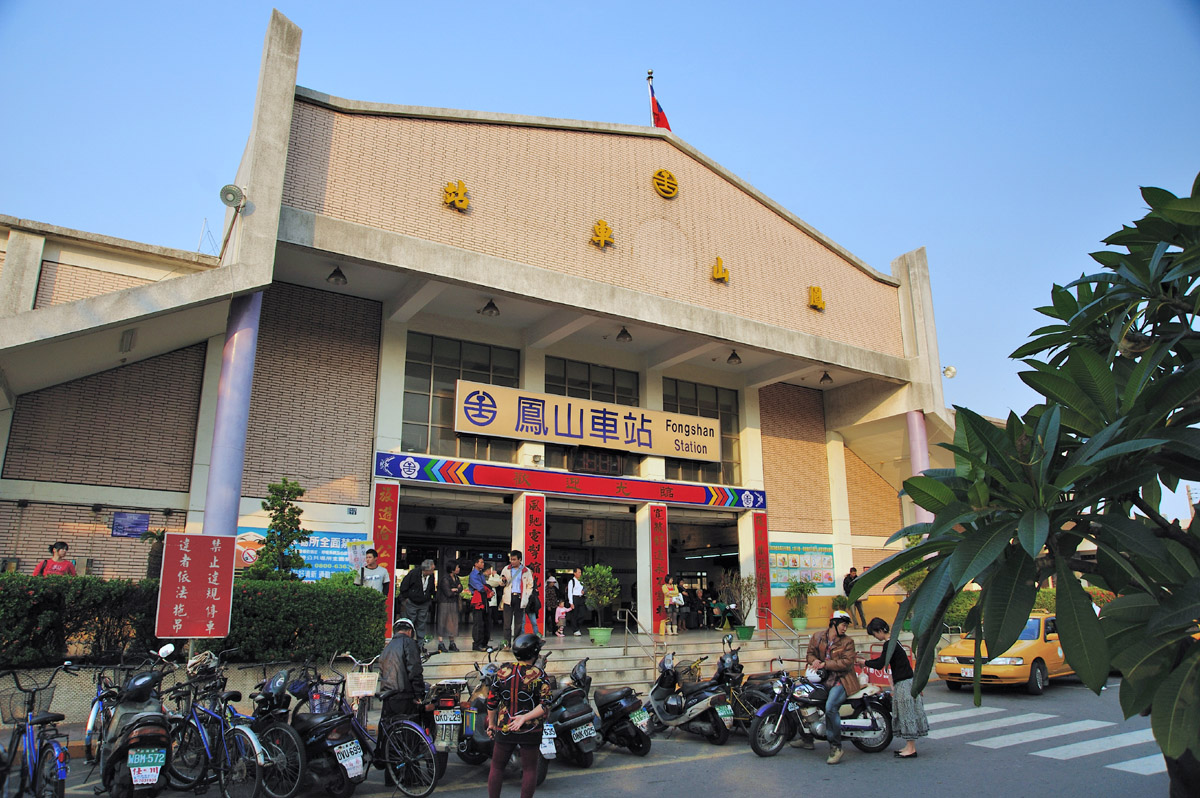
The former station building, built in 1990

The station opened on 1 October 1907 as Hōzan Station (鳳山停車場), part of the first phase of what later became the TRA Pingtung line. In 1935, a brick station building replaced the original wooden station building, and was expanded twice in 1964 and 1990. The station tracks were electrified between 3 May 1995 (from Kaohsiung to Fongshan) and 10 July 1996 (from Fongshan to Pingtung). Until 1998, this station was also served by the south–north line (zh:南北平行預備線) of Taiwan Sugar Railways.

A temporary, underground station building was opened on 22 June 2014 at the site of the former Taiwan Sugar Railways platforms as part of the underground relocation of tracks of the West Coast line. At the same time, the station building was demolished and rebuilt.

== Future plan ==
Because the station is located about 700 meters, or 2300 feet northeast of the Kaohsiung MRT Fongshan Station, some councilors have urged the authorities concerned to find ways such as a corridor or another MRT line to link two stations.

== See also ==
- List of railway stations in Taiwan

== Notes ==
Preceding station	Taiwan Railway	Following station
Zhengyi towards Kaohsiung	Western Trunk line (Pingtung)	Houzhuang towards Fangliao
