= Fongshan West metro station =

Metro station in Fengshan, Kaohsiung, Taiwan

Fongshan West–City Council O11 鳳山西站·市議會
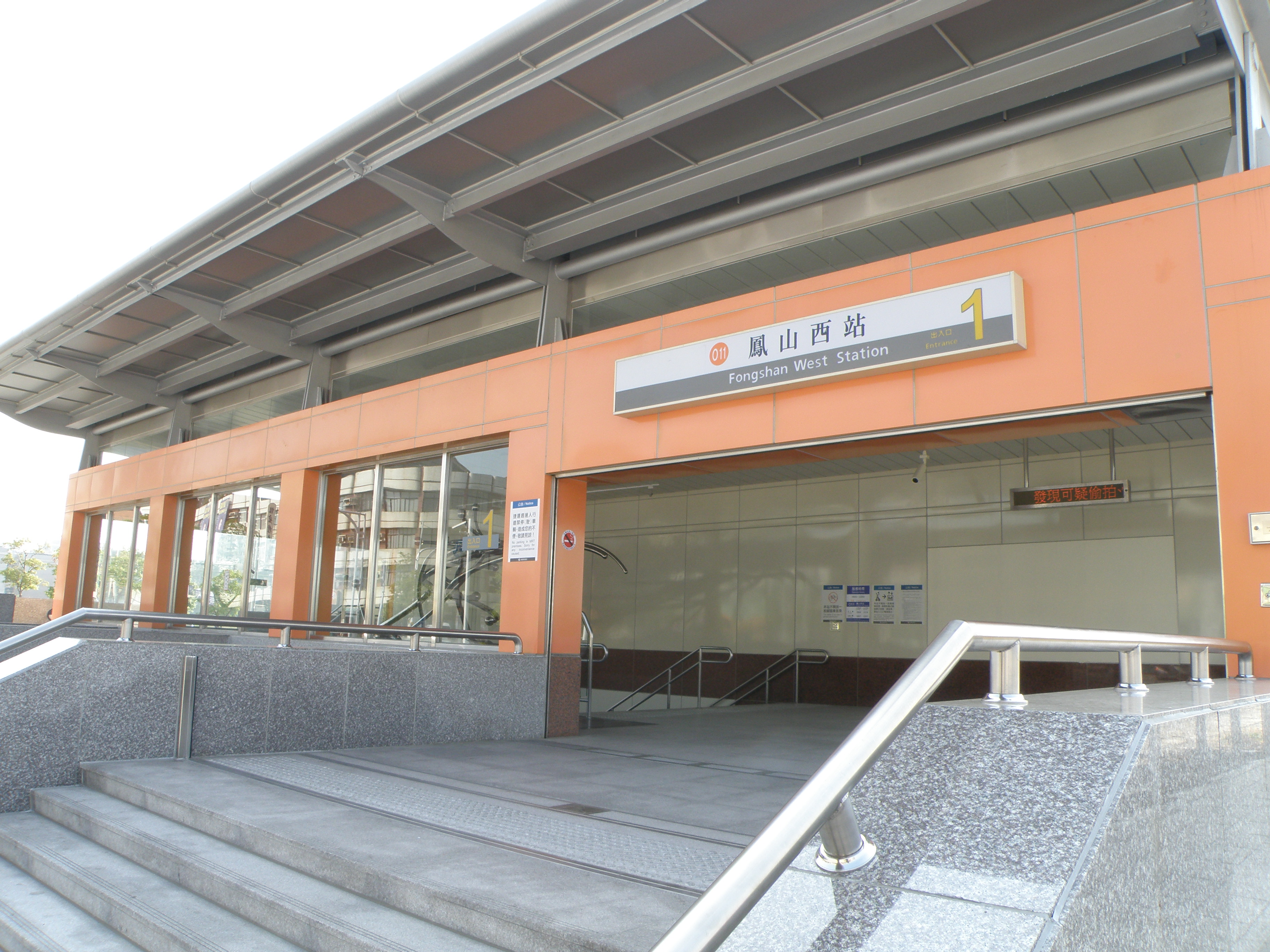
- Exit 1 of Fongshan West station

General information
- Location: Fongshan, Kaohsiung; Taiwan
- Coordinates: 22°37′31″N 120°20′53″E
- Operated by: Kaohsiung Rapid Transit Corporation
- Line: Orange line (O11)
- Platforms: One island platform
- Connections: Bus stop

Construction
- Structure type: Underground
- Accessible: Yes

History
- Opened: 2008-09-14

Passengers
- 4,750 daily (Jan. 2011)

Services
| Preceding station | Kaohsiung Metro | Following station |
|---|---|---|
| Weiwuying towards Hamasen | Orange line | Fongshan towards Daliao |
Location

Fongshan West metro station
- Traditional Chinese: 鳳山西車站
- Simplified Chinese: 凤山西车站
Transcriptions
Standard Mandarin
- Hanyu Pinyin: Fèngshānxī Chēzhàn
- Bopomofo: ㄈㄥˋ ㄕㄢ ㄒㄧ ㄔㄜ ㄓㄢˋ
- Wade–Giles: Fêng^{4}-shan^{1}-hsi^{1} Ch'ê^{1}-chan^{4}
- Tongyong Pinyin: Fòngshānsī Chējhàn

Fongshan West–City Council is a station on the Orange line of the Kaohsiung MRT in Fongshan District, Kaohsiung, Taiwan.

== Station overview ==
This is a two-level, underground station with an island platform and two exits. The station is 214 meters long and is located at the intersection of Fongshan Zihyou Rd. and Cingnian 1st Rd.

=== Station layout ===
| Street level | Entrance/exit | Entrance/exit |
| B1 | Concourse | Lobby, information desk, automatic ticket machines, one-way faregates, restrooms (near exits 1) |
| B2 | Platform 1 | ← KMRT Orange line toward Hamasen (Weiwuying) |
| B2 | Island platform, doors will open on the left |
| B2 | Platform 2 | KMRT Orange line toward Daliao (Fongshan) → |

=== Exits ===
- Exit 1: Zihyou Rd.
- Exit 2: Zihyou Rd., Cingnian Rd.

== Around the station ==
- Fongshan Community Culture Museum
- Kaohsiung City Government
- Kaohsiung City Council
- National Feng-Shan Senior High School
- Zihyou Market
