= Fongshan District =

District in Kaohsiung, Taiwan

Fongshan 鳳山區 Hōzan, Fengshan
- District
- Fongshan District
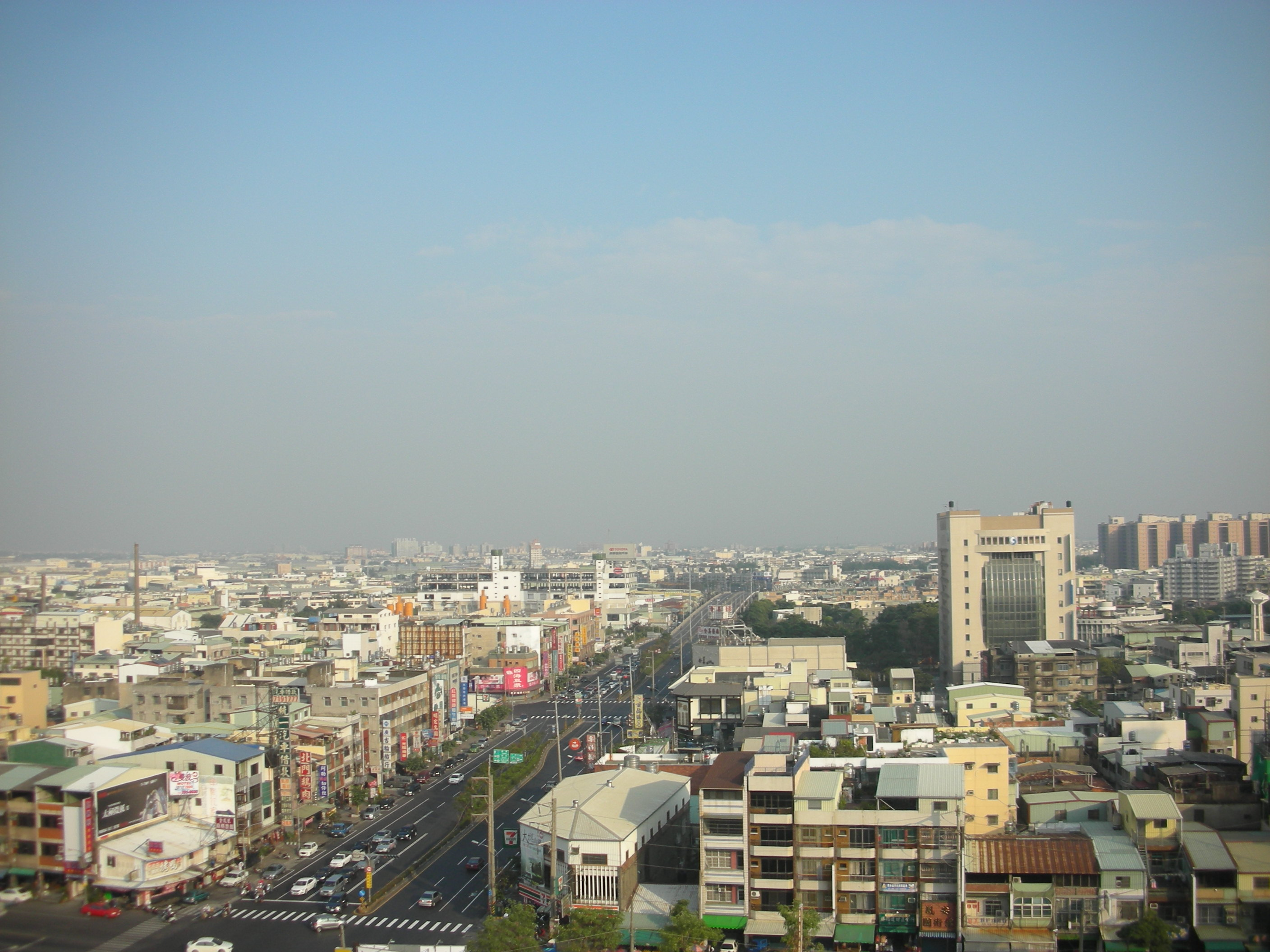

- Logo of the Fongshan District Office

- Location of Fongshan District
- Coordinates: 22°38′N 120°21′E
- Country: Republic of China (Taiwan)
- Municipality: Kaohsiung

Area
  - Total: 26.76 km^{2} (10.33 sq mi)

Population (October 2023)
  - Total: 356,463
  - Density: 13,320/km^{2} (34,500/sq mi)
- Time zone: UTC+8 (National Standard Time)
- Website: fsdo.kcg.gov.tw/en/

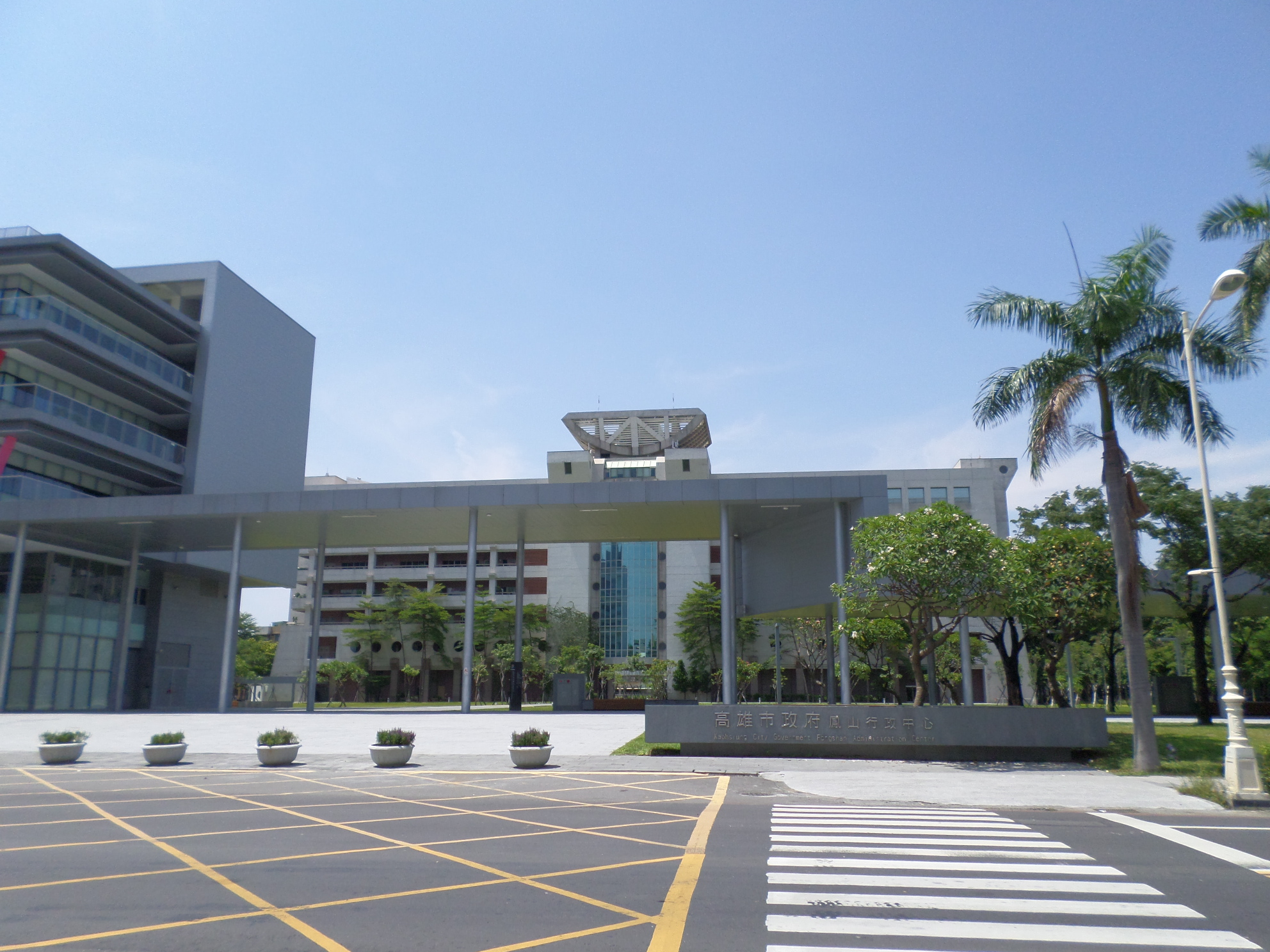
Kaohsiung City Government - Fongshan Administration Center

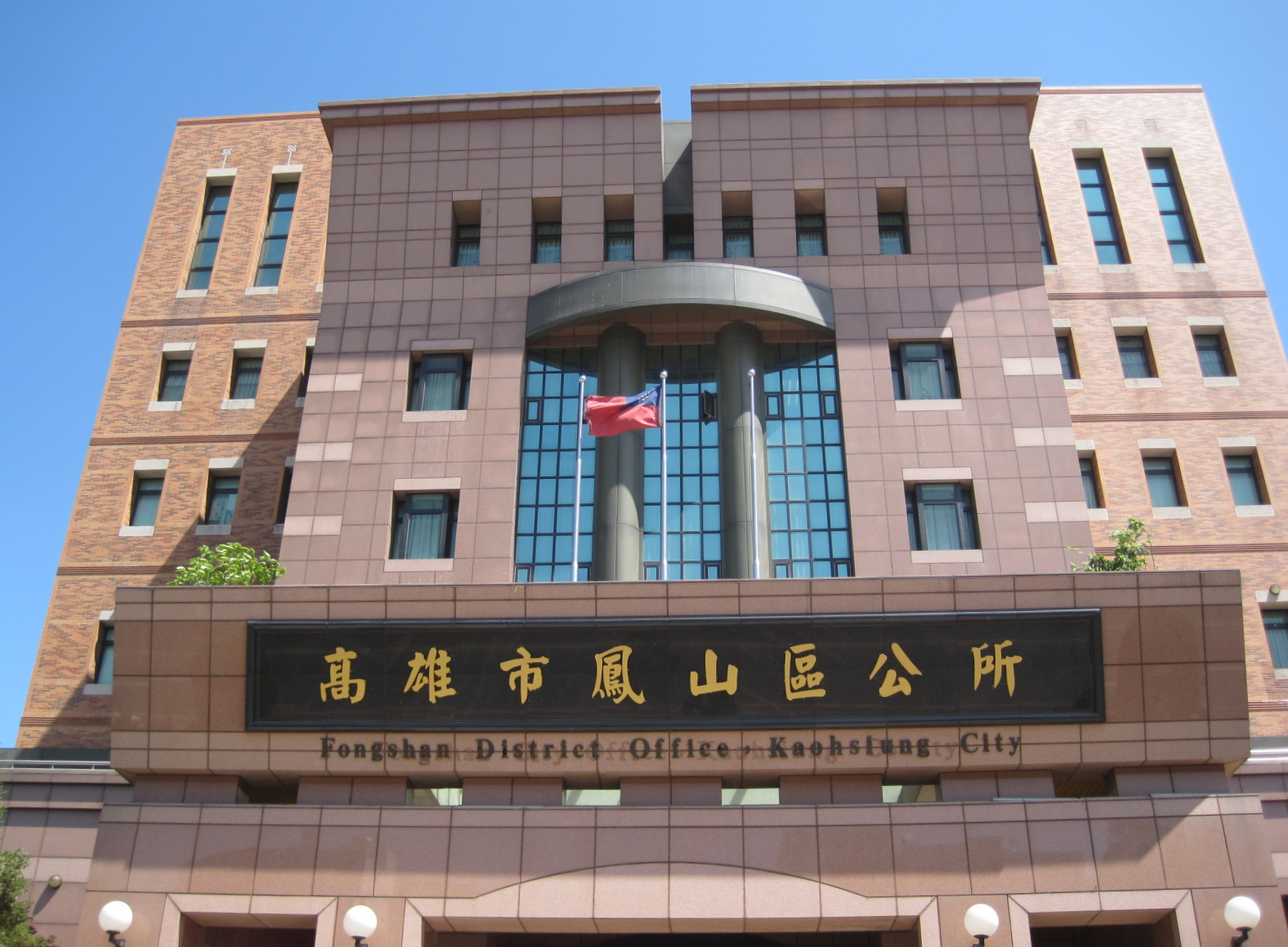
Fongshan District Office

Fongshan District (Chinese: 鳳山區; Hanyu Pinyin: Fèngshān Qū; Tongyong Pinyin: Fòngshan Cyu; Pe̍h-ōe-jī: Hōng-soaⁿ-khu) is a district located in southern Kaohsiung, Taiwan. Fongshan is one of the administrative centers of Kaohsiung and is home to the Republic of China Military Academy. There are three military units currently located in Fongshan. Both the Republic of China Military Academy and R.O.C. Army Infantry School came to Taiwan from mainland China and were re-established here in 1950. Chung Cheng Armed Forces Preparatory School was established in 1976. These three units used to be the main economic driving force, but their importance diminished gradually as Fongshan has established itself as a conjunction between Pingtung City and Kaohsiung.

Although there are several industrial zones at the outskirts of the city, the major lifestyle in Fongshan seems to be very residential. Many apartments were built near the Kaohsiung city center as a result of shifting economic weight. Like most of areas in Taiwan, it also has many night markets scattered around within the city. Most of the night markets run until 2:00 am. Some of them are open on different days of a week, but some others are open all year round. Some of them are temporary, while others have become permanent establishments.

== History ==
During the Dutch era, the current location of Fongshan was called Pongsoya (see Linbian, Pingtung), a group of eight Makatao villages and one of the most populous areas of Taiwan.

=== Qing dynasty ===
During Qing rule, Fengshan District (Formosa) included areas south of Tainan (then called "Taiwan-fu") and west of the mountains. In 1875, the southern part of Fongshan County was separated into Hengchun District.

=== Empire of Japan ===
In 1901, during Japanese rule, Hōzan Chō (Japanese: 鳳山廳) was one of twenty local administrative offices established. According to the 1904 census, Hozan town had a population of 5,750, whereas Hozan District had a population 173,016. In 1909, this unit was merged into Tainan Chō (臺南廳). From 1920 to 1945, under the prefecture system, Hōzan Town (鳳山街) was administered under Hōzan District, Takao Prefecture. After the colonial government started to develop Takao Harbor in the early 20th century, the importance of Fongshan declined.

=== Republic of China ===
Fongshan was the capital of Kaohsiung County, and was established in 1945 as an urban township. It was upgraded to a county-administered city on 1 July 1972. On 24 December 2010, it was upgraded to a district and along with Lingya District has been the city seat of Kaohsiung City since that time.

== Administrative divisions ==
The district consists of Xiankou, Chenggong, Guangming, Xingzhong, Nanxing, Hede, Fenggang, Zhonghe, Zhenbei, Xianya, Wenying, Zhenxi, Zhentung, Beiding, Zhongzheng, Zhennan, Laoye, Ruizhu, Zhongyi, Chengyi, Xinxing, Haiguang, Zhongcheng, Xinjia, Wuhan, Zhengyi, Yijia, Fuxing, Tungmen, Ruixing, Tianxing, Xinjiang, Guotai, Fengtung, Xinfu, Guoguang, Guolong, Wende, Guobei, Caogong, Xingren, Wufu, Zhongxiao, Shengming, Hexing, Xiehe, Wenshan, Fucheng, Chengde, Sanmin, Beimen, Fujia, Nancheng, Wenhua, Dade, Wusong, Wenheng, Wenfu, Chengxin, Chengzhi, Guofu, Wuqing, Haiyang, Xinwu, Xinle, Xintai, Zhonglun, Zhongrong, Zhongmin, Erjia, Longcheng, Furong, Shanmei, Nanhe, Fuxiang and Baoan Villages.

== Climate ==
Fongshan has a tropical climate. The average temperature is 23 °C (73.4 °F). The average precipitation is 1,500 to 2,000 millimeters (59 to 79 inches).

== Government institutions ==
- Kaohsiung City Council

== Education ==
- National FengHsin Senior High School
- National Fengshan Senior High School
- National FongShan Senior Commercial & Industrial Vocational School

== Tourist attractions ==
- Shuangci Pavilion (Mazu) Temple
- Caogong Temple
- Chenghuang Temple
- Chenglan Fort
- Dadong Arts Center
- Dadong Wetlands Park
- Dongbian Gate
- Dongfu Bridge
- Fengshan Gongtong Market
- Fengshan Longshan Temple
- Fengshan Tiangong Temple
- Fongshan Stadium
- Fongshan Community Culture Museum
- Fongyi Tutorial Academy
- Former Japanese Navy Fongshan Communication Center
- Kaohsiung City Symphony Orchestra
- Pingcheng Fort
- Shuangcih Pavilion
- Syunfong Fort
- Weiwuying Metropolitan Park
- Zhonghua Street Night Market

== Transportation ==
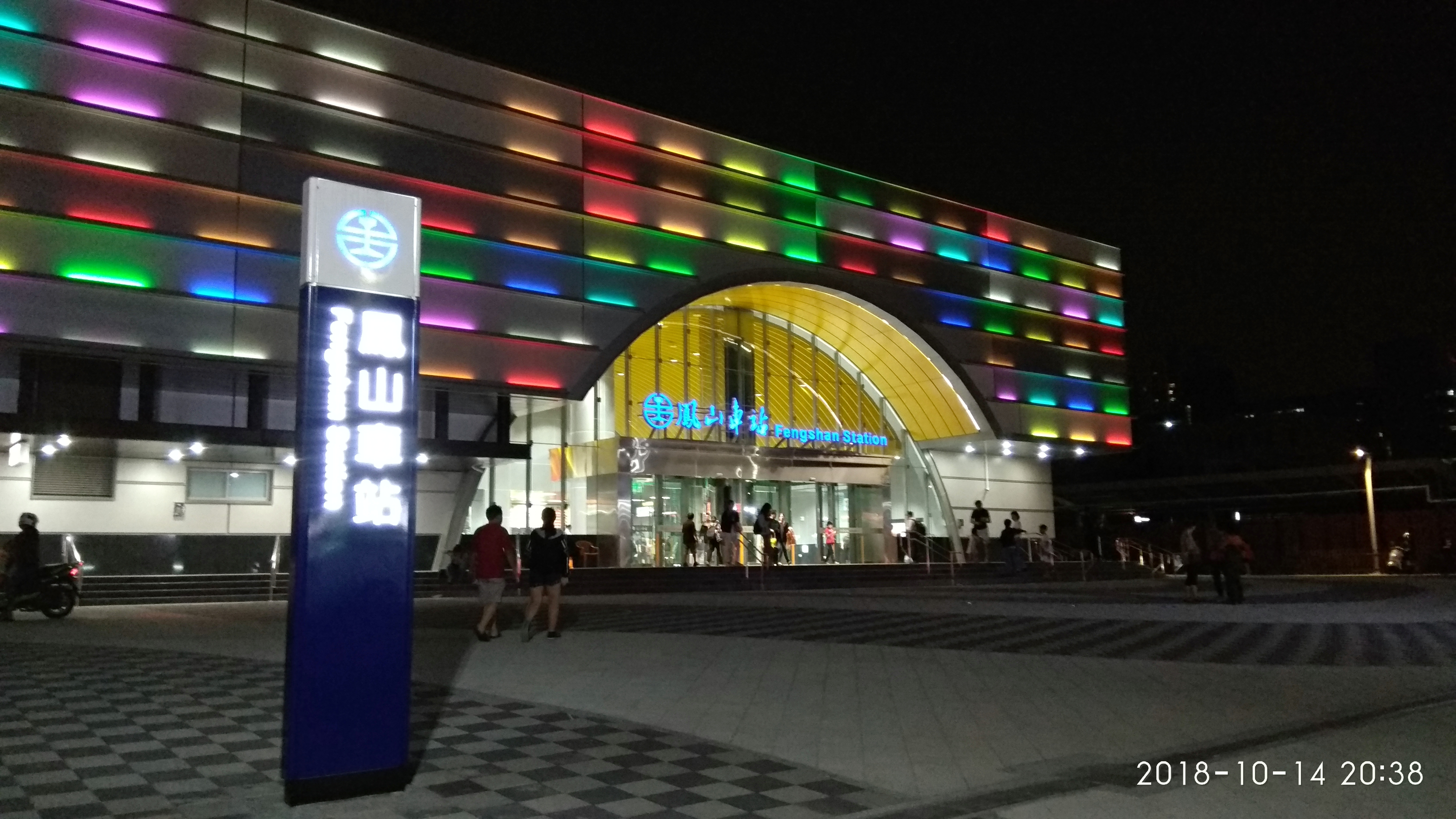
Fengshan Station

=== Roads ===
- National Highway No. 1
- Provincial Highway No. 1
- Provincial Highway No. 1E
- Provincial Highway No. 25
- Provincial Highway No. 88

=== Rails ===
- Fongshan West Station, Fongshan Station, Dadong Station and Fongshan Junior High School Station of the Kaohsiung Mass Rapid Transit
- Fengshan railway station of Taiwan Railway

== Notable natives ==
- Chang Chun-yen, former electrical engineer and professor
- Chen Chi-chuan, Mayor of Kaohsiung (1960–1968)
- Kang Kang, singer and television host
- Lin Ching-hsuan, former writer
- Sammi Kao, singer
- Tyzen Hsiao, composer, pianist and conductor

== See also ==
- Walled City of Fongshan
