= Former residence of Chia-kan Yen =

House in Taipei

Chongqing Residence
- Interactive map of Chongqing Residence

General information
- Location: Bo'ai Special Zone, Zhongzheng District, Taipei City, Taiwan
- Coordinates: 25.0346°N 121.5121°E

The former residence of Chia-kan Yen, in Bo'ai Special Zone, Zhongzheng District, Taipei City, Taiwan, was the official residence of Chia-kan Yen, the fifth president of the Republic of China, and is now a national monument.

The former residence of Chia-kan Yen was initially the official residence of the vice president of the Bank of Taiwan during the Japanese colonial period, with a total area of 843.73 ping (2788m^{2}). The building's main body is a Western-style two-story building with a prominent steeple on the roof. The building area is more than 200 ping (660m^{2}). An additional Japanese-style wooden house was built in 1920. The wall surrounding the building collapsed by 20 meters in the 1963 Su-ao earthquake. The garden trees were planted during the Japanese colonial period. Most of these trees are native Taiwanese species such as ring-cupped oak, subcostate crape myrtle, banyan trees, and liquidambar. There are also three green maples of large diameter. The Western-style cement walls are topped with East Asian-style brick eaves. The building's interior is also decorated in Western style with East Asian-style beams. The first floor of the building includes a reception room, a large dining room, and a Japanese-style wing. The second floor consists of a study, bedroom, and living room.

Chia-kan Yen took over this residence from the Japanese government in 1945 when he was a member of the National Government's Taiwan Taking-over Committee. He became the chairman of the Bank of Taiwan the following year and moved there. When Yen was elected vice president, the Office of the President bought the residence from the Bank of Taiwan in lieu of his presence.

On July 17, 2001, the National Historic Site Inspection Committee of the Ministry of the Interior approved what it termed Mr. Chia-kan Yen’s Former Residence as a National Historic Site.

== See also ==
- President of the Republic of China
  - Office of the President (Taiwan)
    - Presidential Office Building, Taipei
  - Official Residence of the President (Republic of China)
    - Shilin Official Residence
    - Seven Seas Residence
