= Vice President of China (disambiguation) =

The Vice President of China is the ceremonial office and the deputy to the president of the People's Republic of China (PRC) since 1982.

Vice President of China may refer to:

- Vice President of the Republic of China (1912–1917)
- Vice Chairperson of the Central People's Government (1949–1954)
- Vice Chairperson of the People's Republic of China (1954–1975)
- Vice President of the Republic of China, the second-highest constitutional office in Taiwan (1948-present)

== See also ==
- President of China (disambiguation)
- Premier of China (disambiguation)
