= Official Residence of the President (Republic of China) =

Official Residence of the President of the Republic of China
- 中華民國總統官邸
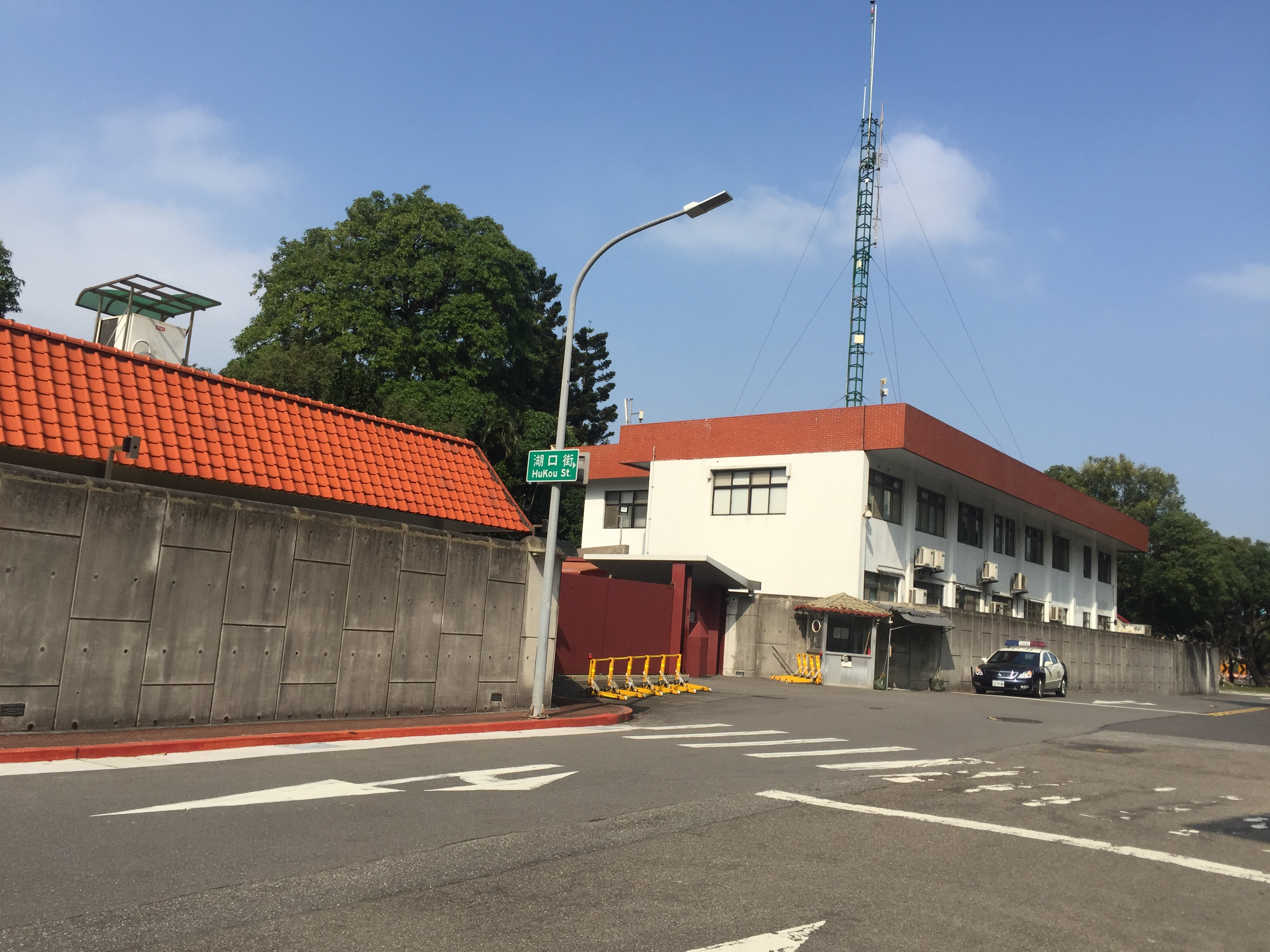
- Outside of ROC President's Official Residence
- Interactive map of the Official Residence of the President of the Republic of China area
- Alternative names: Wanli Residence

General information
- Status: In use
- Type: Official residence
- Location: Bo'ai Special Zone, Taipei, Taiwan
- Current tenants: Lai Ching-te (ROC President)
- Owner: Government of the Republic of China

The official residence of the president (Chinese: 總統官邸; pinyin: Zǒngtǒng Guāndǐ; Pe̍h-ōe-jī: Chóng-thóng Koaⁿ-tí) is provided by the government of the Republic of China for the president, while in office, along with his or her family.

The current official residence is at the intersection of Chongqing South Road Section 2 and Aiguo West Road, Zhongzheng, Taipei, and has been in use since Lee Teng-hui's presidency. Security of the residence is maintained by the Sixth Special Corps of the National Police Agency along with a wall along the perimeter of the complex.

The vice president's official residence is separate from that of the president. The current official residence is on Ren'ai Road Section 3.

== Presidential residences ==
The name of the presidential official residence is the same as the code name, picked by the president, used by the National Security Bureau for the president's security detail. The name "official residence" (Chinese: 官邸; pinyin: Guāndǐ; Pe̍h-ōe-jī: Koaⁿ-tí) and "residence" (Chinese: 寓所; pinyin: Yùsuǒ; Pe̍h-ōe-jī: Gū-só͘) were used by different presidents depending on their preference.

Order	Dates	Location	Residence name	President	Notes
1	May 20, 1948–Jan 21, 1949	3 Huangpu Road, No. 1 District, Nanking	Resting	Chiang Kai-shek	
2	Jan 21, 1949–Apr 23, 1949	68 Fuhougang Road, No. 6 District, Nanking	none	Li Tsung-jen	Now known as the former site of Li Zongren Mansion, it is a cultural relic protection unit in Jiangsu.
3	Mar 1, 1950—Apr 5, 1975	60 Fulin Rd, Shilin, Taipei	Shilin Official Residence	Chiang Kai-shek	Maintained as a national monument
4	Apr 6, 1975—May 20, 1978	2 Chongqing S Rd Sec 2, Zhongzheng, Taipei	Chungking Official Residence	Yen Chia-kan	Maintained as a national monument
5	May 20, 1978—Jan 13, 1988	271 Bei'an Rd, Dazhi, Zhongshan, Taipei	Seven Seas Residence	Chiang Ching-kuo	Maintained as a municipal monument of Taipei
6	Jan 13, 1988—present	Intersection of Chongqing S Rd Sec 2 and Aiguo W Rd, Zhongzheng, Taipei	Da'an Official Residence	Lee Teng-hui	Current presidential residence
6	Jan 13, 1988—present	Intersection of Chongqing S Rd Sec 2 and Aiguo W Rd, Zhongzheng, Taipei	Yushan Official Residence	Chen Shui-bian	Current presidential residence
6	Jan 13, 1988—present	Intersection of Chongqing S Rd Sec 2 and Aiguo W Rd, Zhongzheng, Taipei	Zhongxing Residence	Ma Ying-jeou	Current presidential residence
6	Jan 13, 1988—present	Intersection of Chongqing S Rd Sec 2 and Aiguo W Rd, Zhongzheng, Taipei	Yonghe Residence	Tsai Ing-wen	Current presidential residence
6	Jan 13, 1988—present	Intersection of Chongqing S Rd Sec 2 and Aiguo W Rd, Zhongzheng, Taipei	Wanli Residence	William Lai	Current presidential residence

== Code names ==
The official residence of the president and vice president takes on a different alias depending on the code name assigned by the National Security Bureau. The code name is usually selected depending on the current state of the nation, the transfer of power between political parties, or the incoming president's style of governance and ideals.

=== President ===
Term	President	Code name				Meaning
Term	President	Character	Mandarin	Taiwanese	Hakka	Meaning
1st—5th	Chiang Kai-shek	—N/a	—N/a	—N/a	—N/a	Lived in Shilin Official Residence
5th	Yen Chia-kan	重慶	Chóngqìng	Tiōng-khèng	Chhùng-khin	"Double celebration"; also the name of the wartime capital Chungking.
6th, 7th	Chiang Ching-kuo	七海	Qīhǎi	Chhit-hái	Chhit-hói	"Seven Seas"; Named after the United States Seventh Fleet that protected Taiwan during the First Taiwan Strait Crisis.
7th—9th	Lee Teng-hui	大安	Dà'ān	Tāi-an	Thai-ôn	"Great Peace"; also the location of Lee's previous home in (Daan, Taipei).
10th, 11th	Chen Shui-bian	玉山	Yùshān	Gio̍k-san	Ngiu̍k-sân	"Jade Mountain"; named after the tallest mountain in Taiwan; also to symbolize a new era with the "son of Taiwan" taking office in the first transfer of power between political parties.
12th, 13th	Ma Ying-jeou	中興	Zhōngxīng	Tiong-heng	Chûng-hîn	"Revitalization"; marks the second transfer of power; also a combination of the characters in the addresses of the official residence (Zhongzheng, Taipei) and Ma's private home (Xinglong Road, Wenshan, Taipei).
14th, 15th	Tsai Ing-wen	永和	Yǒnghé	Éng-hô	Yún-fò	"Eternal peace"; marks the third transfer of power; also the previous location of Tsai's household registration in Yonghe, New Taipei.
16th	William Lai	萬里	Wànlǐ	Bān-lí	Van-lî	"Ten thousand li;" named after Lai's birthplace Wanli, New Taipei.

=== Vice president ===
Term	Vice President	Code name				Meaning
Term	Vice President	Character	Mandarin	Taiwanese	Hakka	Meaning
2nd, 3rd	Chen Cheng	—N/a	—N/a	—N/a	—N/a	
4th, 5th	Yen Chia-kan	重慶	Chóngqìng	Tiōng-khèng	Chhùng-khin	Same as section above
6th	Hsieh Tung-min	—N/a	—N/a	—N/a	—N/a	
7th	Lee Teng-hui	大安	Dà'ān	Tāi-an	Thai-ôn	Same as section above
8th	Li Yuan-tsu	崇實	Chóngshí	Chông-si̍t	Chhùng-sṳ̍t	
9th	Lien Chan	敦化	Dūnhuà	Tun-hòa	Tûn-fa	
10th, 11th	Annette Lu	仁愛	Rén'ài	Jîn-ài	Yìn-oi	
12th	Vincent Siew	長安	Cháng'ān	Tiông-an	Chhòng-ôn	
13th	Wu Den-yih	和平	Hépíng	Hô-pêng	Fò-phìn	
14th	Chen Chien-jen	平安	Píng'ān	Pêng-an	Phìn-ôn	"Peace or safety;" derived from "平安喜樂 (Peace and joy)", formerly "聖家 (Holy family)"; changed after his inauguration. Both code names were named after Chen's Catholic faith.
15th	William Lai	萬里	Wànlǐ	Bān-lí	Van-lî	"Ten thousand li;" named after Lai's birthplace Wanli, New Taipei.
16th	Hsiao Bi-khim	安平	Ānpíng	An-pîng	Ôn-phìn	"Safe and peaceful;" named after the historical international port Anping in Hsiao's hometown Tainan, symbolizing Taiwan's international aspirations.

== See also ==
- Presidential Office Building, Taipei
- Presidential Palace (Nanjing)
