= Chairman of China =

Chairman of China, formally named "President of China" since its restoration in 1982, refers to the nominal state representative of the People's Republic of China (PRC).

Chairman of China may also refer to:

== Leadership positions ==
Current central organs of the Chinese Communist Party (CCP) and People's Republic of China

- Chairman of the Standing Committee of the National People's Congress
- Chairman of the Chinese People's Political Consultative Conference
- Chairman of the Central Military Commission (China)

Historical central organs of the Chinese Communist Party and People's Republic of China

- Chairman of the Chinese Communist Party (1943–1982), then renamed to "General Secretary"
- Chairman of the Central People's Government of the People's Republic of China (1949–1954)
- Chairman of the People's Republic of China (1954–1975), then abolished in 1975

The Nationalist government of the Republic of China (1925–1948)

- Chairman of the Kuomintang
- Chairman of the National Government
- Chairman of the Military Affairs Commission

== People ==
- Mao Zedong, also known as "Chairman Mao", held several positions above between 1943 and 1976
- Chiang Kai-shek, held several positions above between 1926 and 1948, most notably during World War II

== See also ==
- Vice Chairman of China (disambiguation)
- President of China (disambiguation)
- Abolition of the presidency in China
- List of Chinese leaders
