= Bo'ai Special Zone =

Area in Zhongzheng, Taipei, Taiwan

Coordinates: 25°02′21″N 121°30′45″E

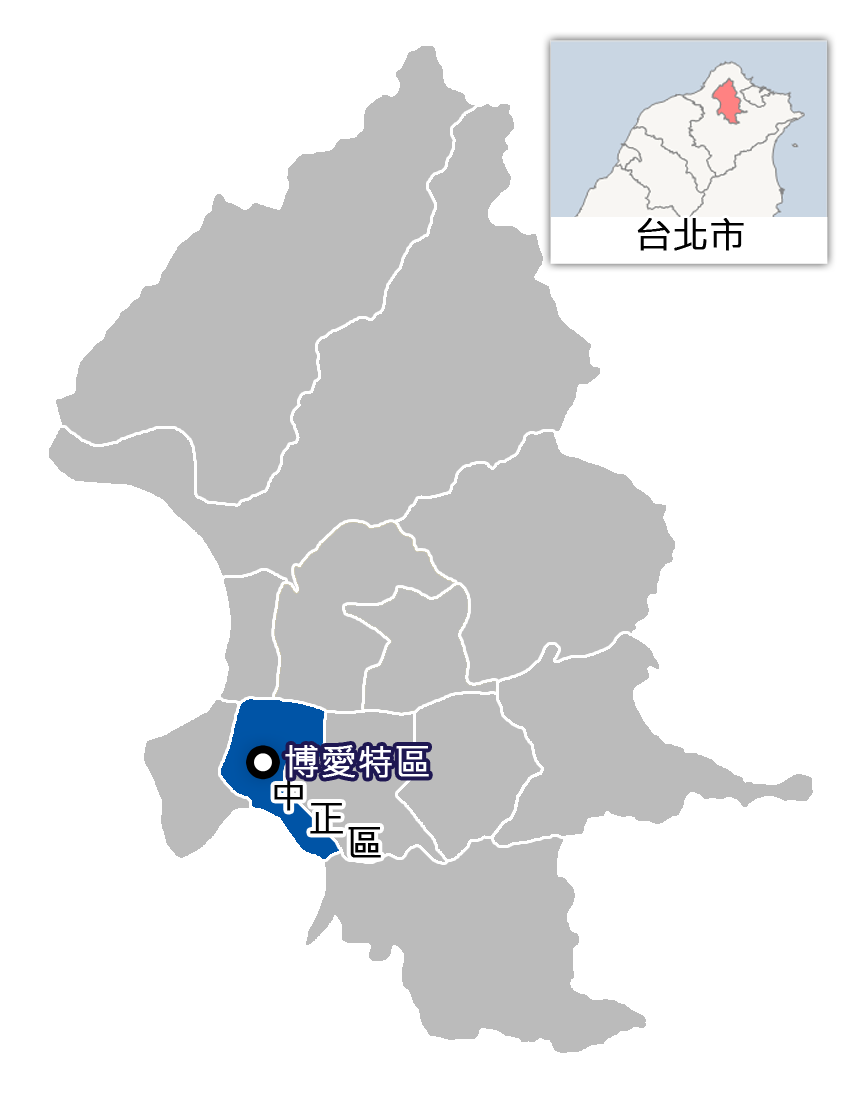
- Bo'ai Special Zone in Zhongzheng District of Taipei City
- Traditional Chinese: 博愛特區
Transcriptions
Standard Mandarin
- Hanyu Pinyin: Bó'ài Tèqū
- Wade–Giles: Po²-ai⁴ T′e⁴-ch′ü¹
Hakka
- Pha̍k-fa-sṳ: Pok-oi Thi̍t-khî
Southern Min
- Hokkien POJ: Phok-ài Te̍k-khu
- Tâi-lô: Phok-ài Ti̍k-khu

Bo'ai Garrison-controlled Zone
- Traditional Chinese: 臺北市博愛警備管制區
Transcriptions
Standard Mandarin
- Hanyu Pinyin: Táiběishì Bó'ài Jǐngbèi Guǎnzhìqū
- Wade–Giles: T′ai²-pei³-shih⁴ Po²-ai⁴ Ching³-pei⁴ Kuan³-chih⁴-ch′ü¹
Hakka
- Pha̍k-fa-sṳ: Thòi-pet-sṳ Pok-oi Kín-phi Kón-chṳ-khî
Southern Min
- Hokkien POJ: Tâi-pak-chhī Phok-ài Kéng-pī Koán-chè-khu
- Tâi-lô: Tâi-pak-tshī Phok-ài Kíng-pī Kuán-tsè-khu

The Bo'ai Special Zone is a restricted zone in Zhongzheng District, Taipei, Taiwan, for the protection of the Presidential Office Building. It is in the historic center of Taipei and includes other government office buildings and historic sites.

== Introduction ==
The Bo'ai special zone is located in the historic center of Taipei. Taipei has been the capital of Taiwan since the late-19th century. The Japanese constructed the modern government buildings starting in the 1910s; the Governor-General of Taiwan's office came first, followed by surrounding government buildings. The cluster became the center of the Government-General of Taiwan. The Republic of China relocated to Taiwan in late-1949 and the government moved into the Government-General buildings. The President of the Republic took over the Governor-General building as the Presidential Office Building.

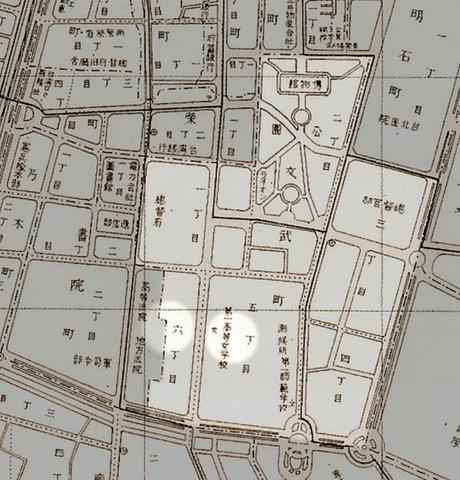
Japanese era map around the Government-General of Taiwan building

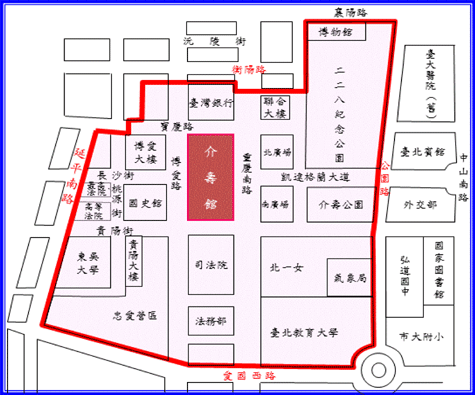
Detailed map of Bo'ai special zone

The zone was claimed jointly by the Ministry of National Defense and Ministry of the Interior according to the National Security Act to protect the head of state and commander-in-chief. The zone covers of the surrounding area of the Presidential Office Building within distance between 200 and 500 meters. Buildings built within this area are subject to height limit of 24 meters, with some extra requirements of window sizes. The area is also designed as a prohibited airspace.

== Governmental Buildings also recognized as National Monuments ==
Name	Presidential Office Building	Judicial Building
Photo		
Tenants	Workplace of the President of the Republic; Workplace of the Vice President of the Republic; Office of the President (secretariat); National Security Council	Judicial Yuan; Constitutional Court; Disciplinary Sanction Court
Formerly	Government-General of Taiwan (Workplace of the Governor-general)	High court of the Government-General of Taiwan; Taihoku District Court

== Other government agencies ==
- Academia Historia (Taipei municipal monument, formerly the Communications Bureau of Government-General of Taiwan)
- Armed Forces Reserve Command of Ministry of National Defense (Taipei municipal monument, formerly the Taiwan Army of Japan Headquarter)
- Central Weather Bureau
- Ministry of Justice
- National Development Council
- Supreme Administrative Court
- Supreme Court
- Supreme Prosecutors Office
- Taiwan High Court
- Taiwan High Prosecutors Office
- Taiwan Taipei District Court

== Other historical sites ==
- Bank of Taiwan Head Office (Taipei municipal monument)
- Chunghwa Telecom Bo'ai Service Center (Taipei municipal monument, formerly the Telephone exchange office of Government-General of Taiwan)
- National Taiwan Museum (National monuments, formerly the Museum of Government-General of Taiwan)
- Natural History Branch of National Taiwan Museum (Taipei municipal monument, formerly Nippon Kangyo Bank Taihoku Branch)
- Taipei First Girls' High School (Taipei municipal monument, formerly Taihoku First Girls' High School)

== Other locations ==
Schools:

- Chinese Culture University Yanping Extension Education Center
- Soochow University Downtown Campus
- Taipei First Girls' High School (formerly Taihoku First Girls' High School)
- University of Taipei Bo'ai Campus (formerly Taihoku Normal School of Government-General of Taiwan)

Parks:

- 228 Peace Memorial Park (formerly Taihoku New Park)
- Jieshou Park

== See also ==
- Exclusion zone
- Military exclusion zone
- Prohibited airspace
- Kasumigaseki
- Washington, D.C.
- Zhongnanhai
