= President of China (disambiguation) =

The President of China is the ceremonial state representative of the People's Republic of China since 1982.

President of China may refer to:

- President of the Republic of China, head of state and commander-in-chief of China (1912–1928)
- Chairman of the National Government, head of state and commander-in-chief of China (1928–1948)
- Chairman of the People's Republic of China, state representative of the People's Republic of China (1954–1975)
- President of the Republic of China, head of state and commander-in-chief of the Republic of China (Taiwan)

== See also ==
- List of presidents of China
- Abolition of the presidency in China
- Premier of China (disambiguation)
- Chairman of China (disambiguation)
- Paramount leader
