= Shilin Official Residence =

Residence in Shilin, Taipei, Taiwan

Coordinates: 25°5′42.19″N 121°31′49.32″E

Shilin Official Residence 士林官邸
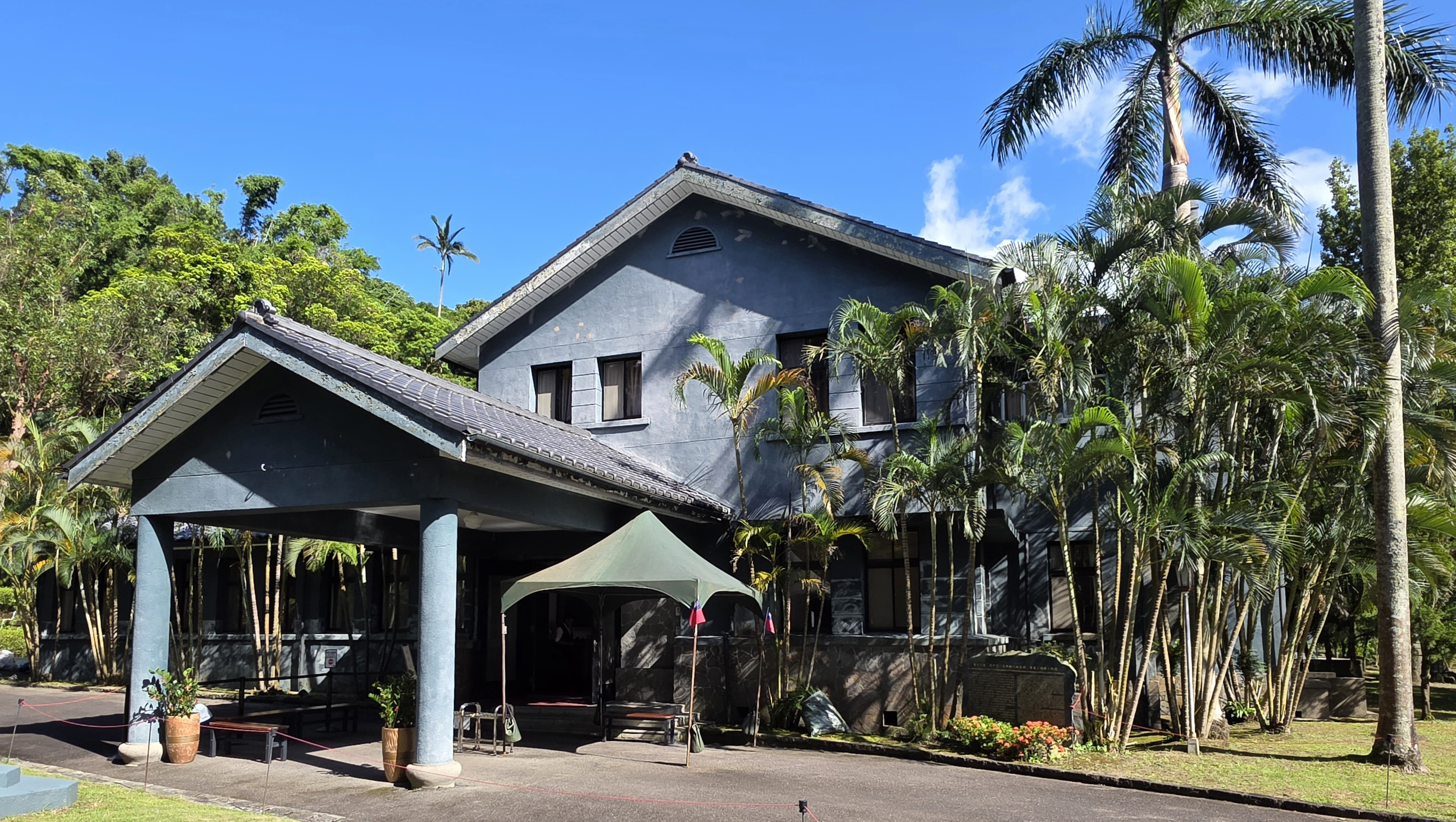
- Interactive map of Shilin Official Residence 士林官邸
- Location: Taipei
- Created: 1996 opened to public
- Status: Open all year

The Shilin Official Residence (Chinese: 士林官邸; pinyin: Shìlín Guāndǐ) is the former residence of late Republic of China President Chiang Kai-shek along with his wife Soong Mei-Ling located on Zhongshan North Road in Shilin District, Taipei, Taiwan.

== History ==
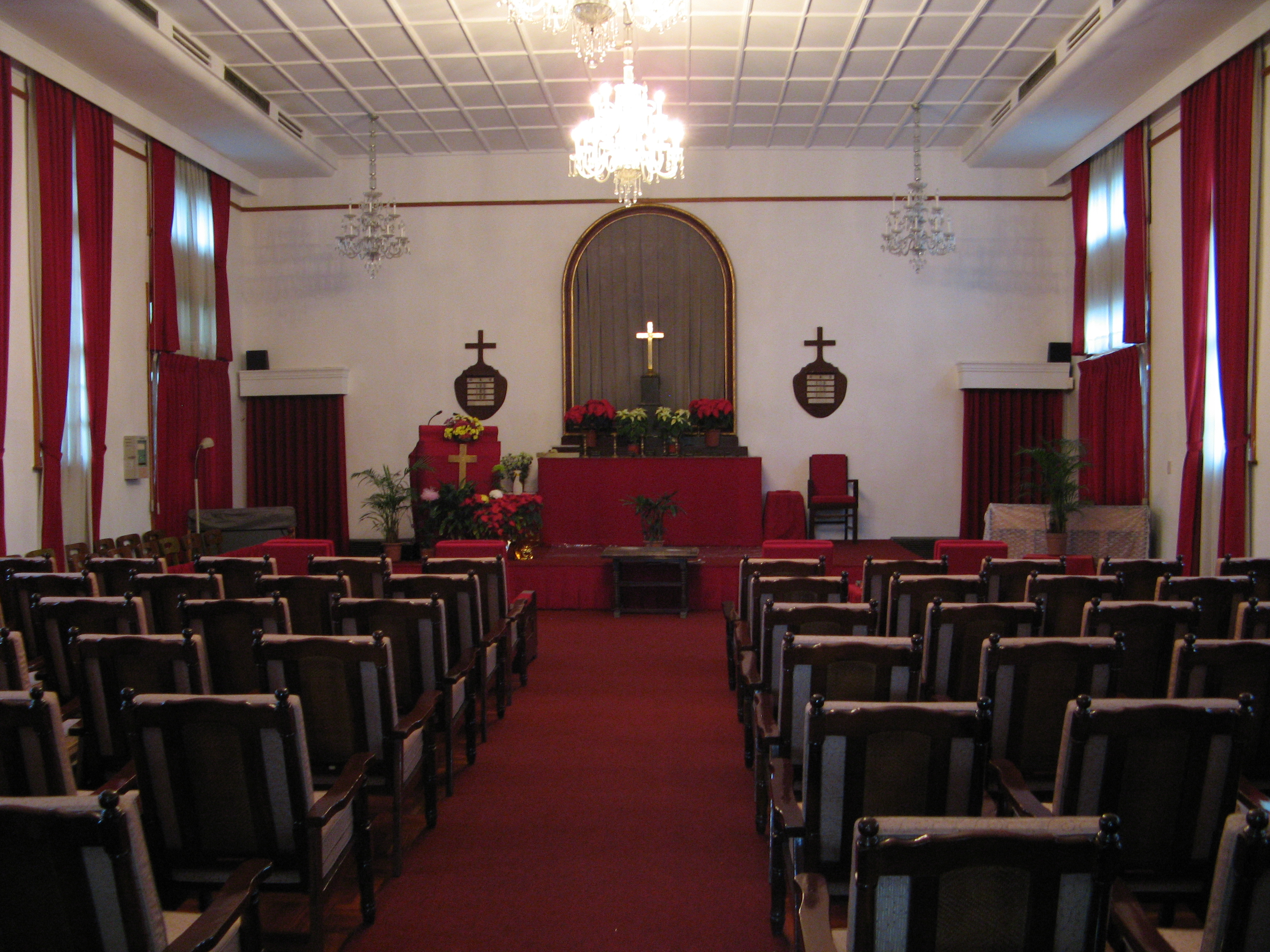
Interior of the Victory Chapel.

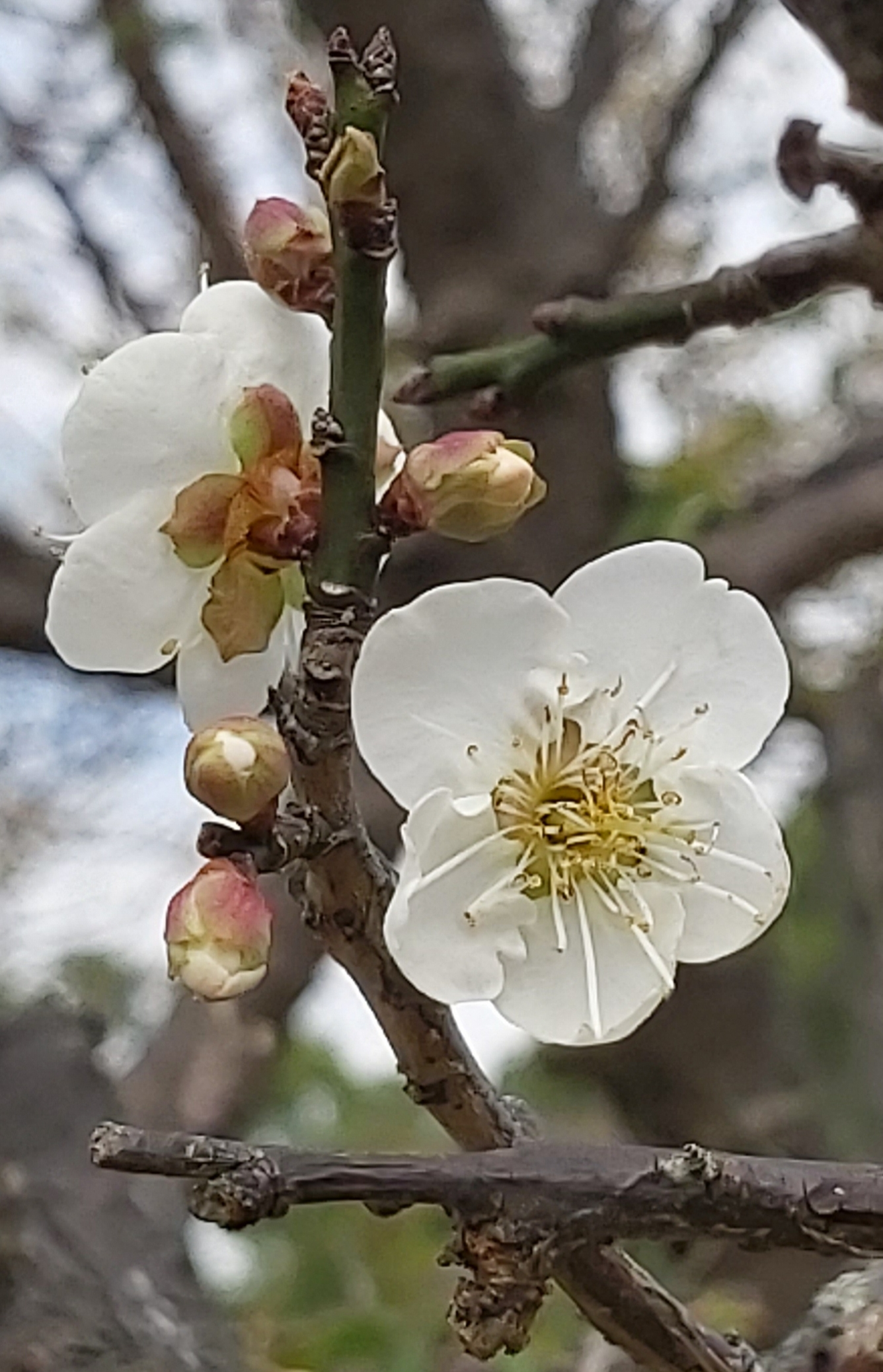
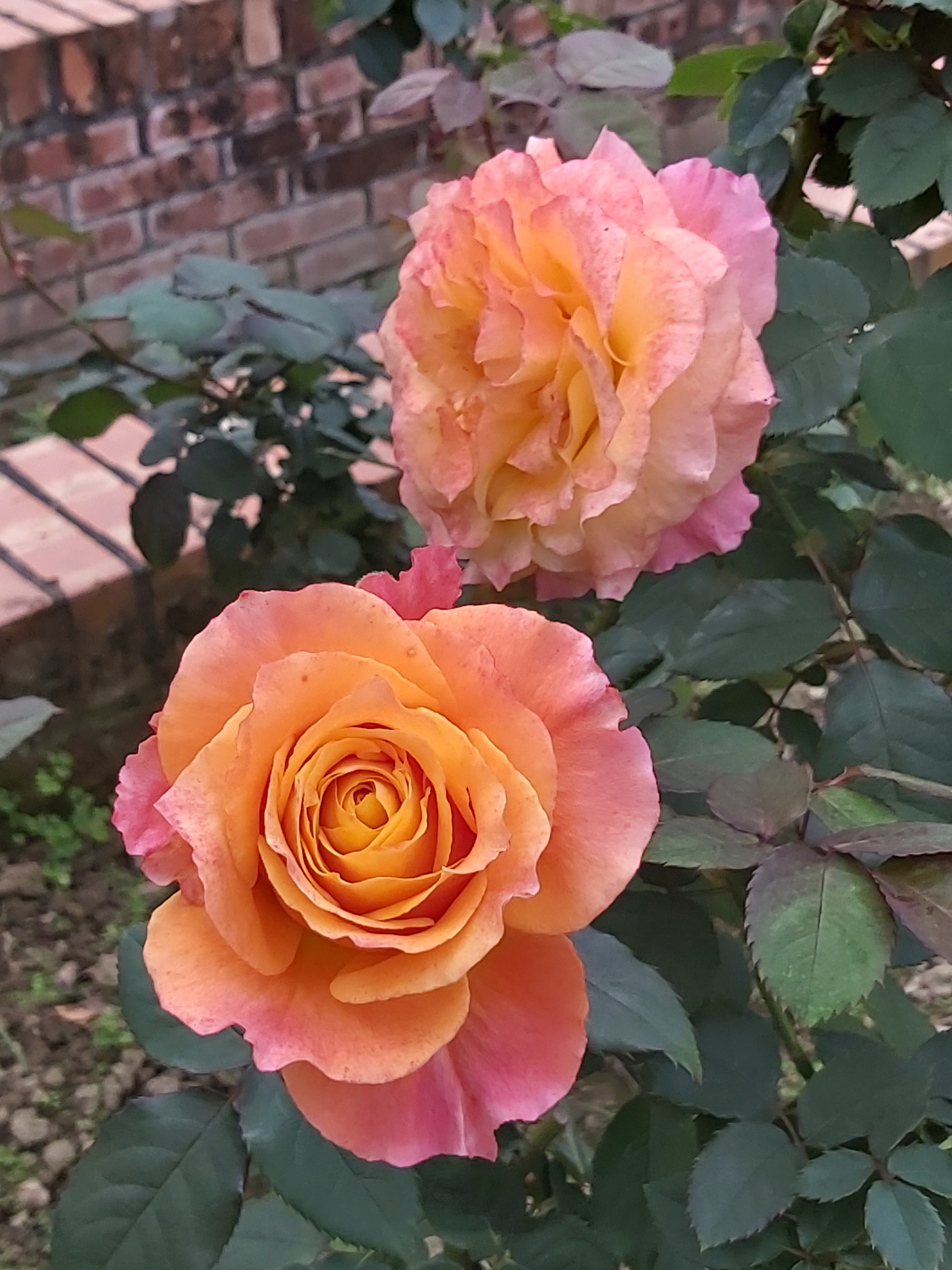
Plum blossoms and Rose in the garden of the Shilin Residence.

During the Japanese Colonial era on Taiwan, it was the location of the Shilin Horticultural Experimental Station. After the Republic of China lost the Chinese Civil War in 1949 and retreated to Taiwan, the property was requisitioned to the government and transformed into the residence of Chiang Kai-shek and Soong Mei-ling by architect Yang Cho-cheng. Construction was completed by the Continental Engineering Corporation. In the early days of the Republic of China on Taiwan, the residence was heavily militarized, fortified, and closed to the public.

Since 1996, the Residence has been open to the public and is a popular place for viewing the gardens. The gardens include both Chinese- and Western-style horticulture. In addition to the gardens, the official residence includes the former home of Chiang Kai-shek and Soong Mei-ling. The official residence is a two-story western-style home. The residence is currently open to the public as of January 2, 2011. In addition, the grounds include Madame Chiang Kai-shek's former Cadillac limousine, Chiang Kai-shek's personal Victory Chapel, and the Xinlan Pavilion (新蘭亭) with inscription by Yu Youren, which hosted Chiang's birthday celebrations. Former President Chen Shui-bian revealed that the grounds contain the entrance to a hidden tunnel that connects to the Presidential Office Building in Zhongzheng District, Taipei.

== Famous guests ==
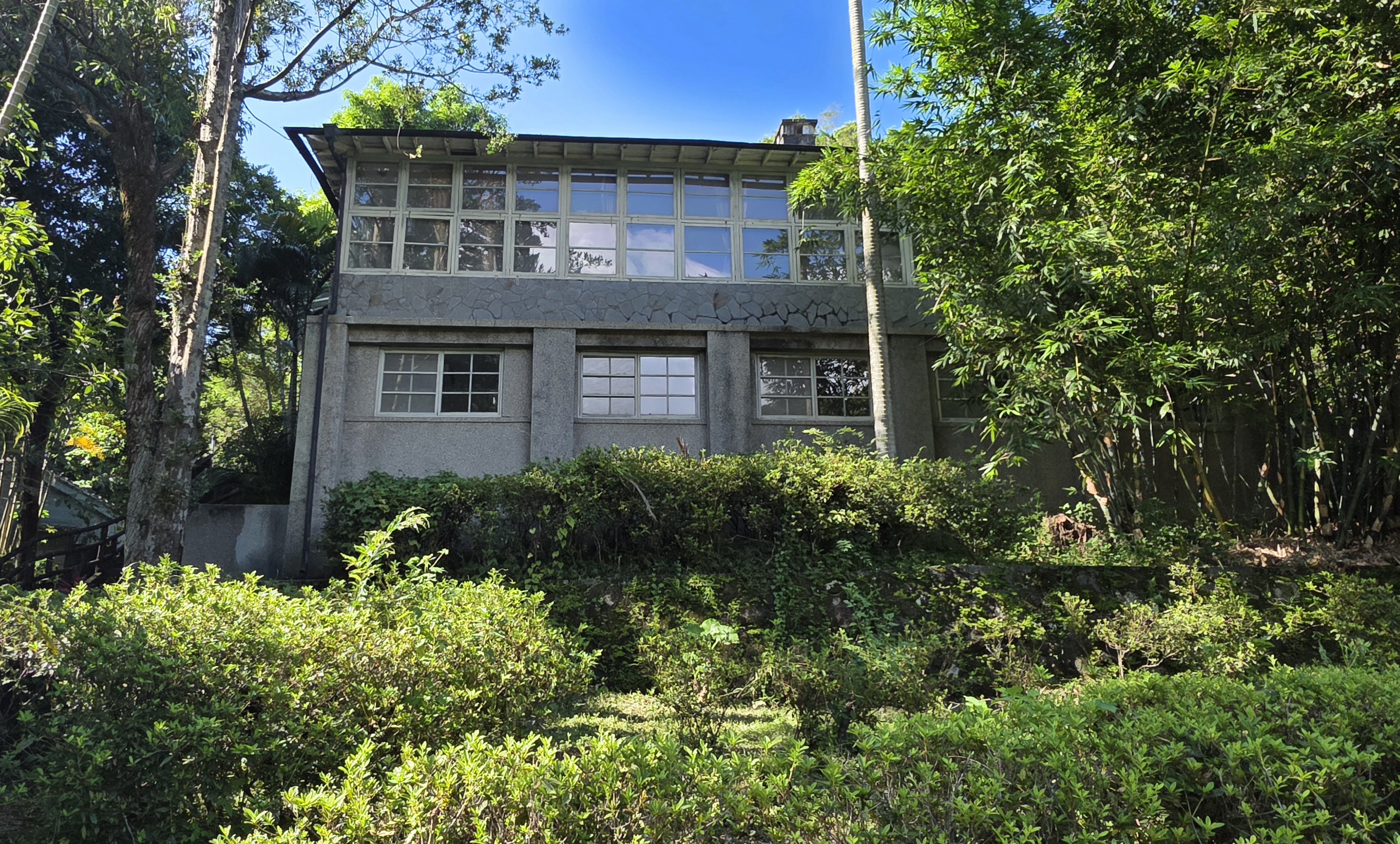
Guest House of Shilin Official Residence.

The residence has hosted famous guests and foreign dignitaries visiting Taiwan, including then President of the United States of America, Dwight D. Eisenhower, and U.S. Secretary of State John Foster Dulles. In 1971, Ronald Reagan stayed at the residence when he was in Taipei as the United States representative to the Double Ten Day Celebrations.

== Gallery ==
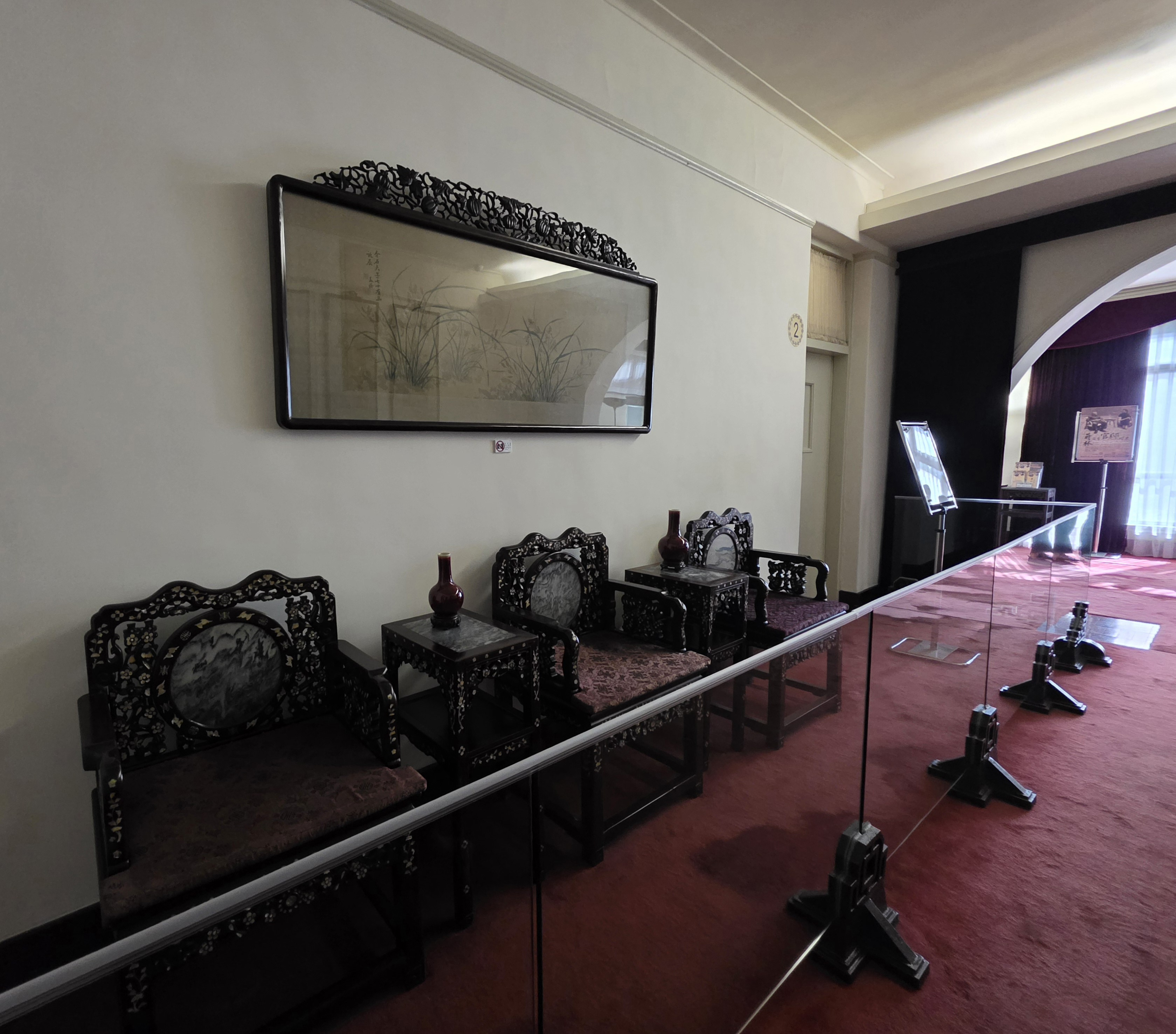
Vestibule

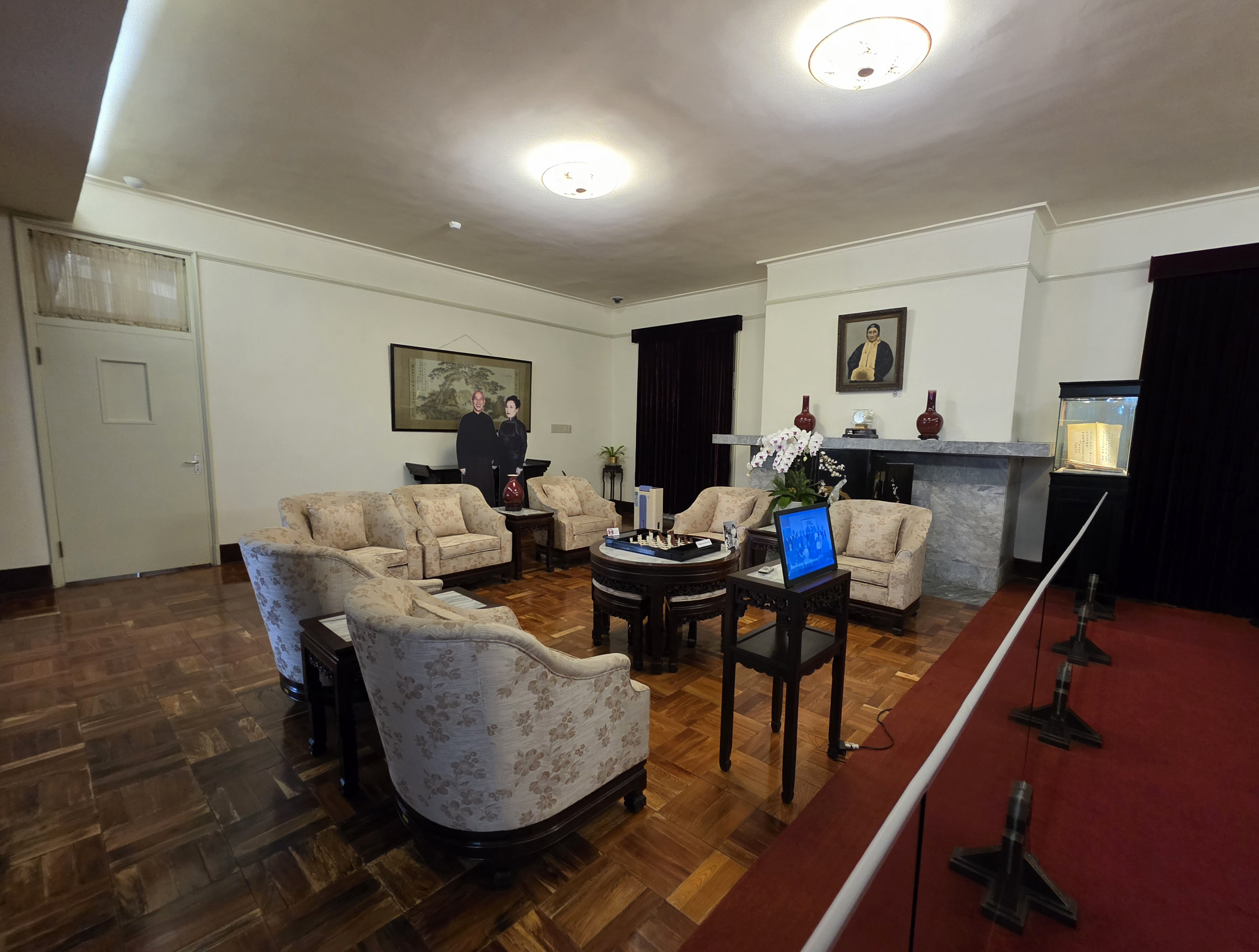
Small Living Room

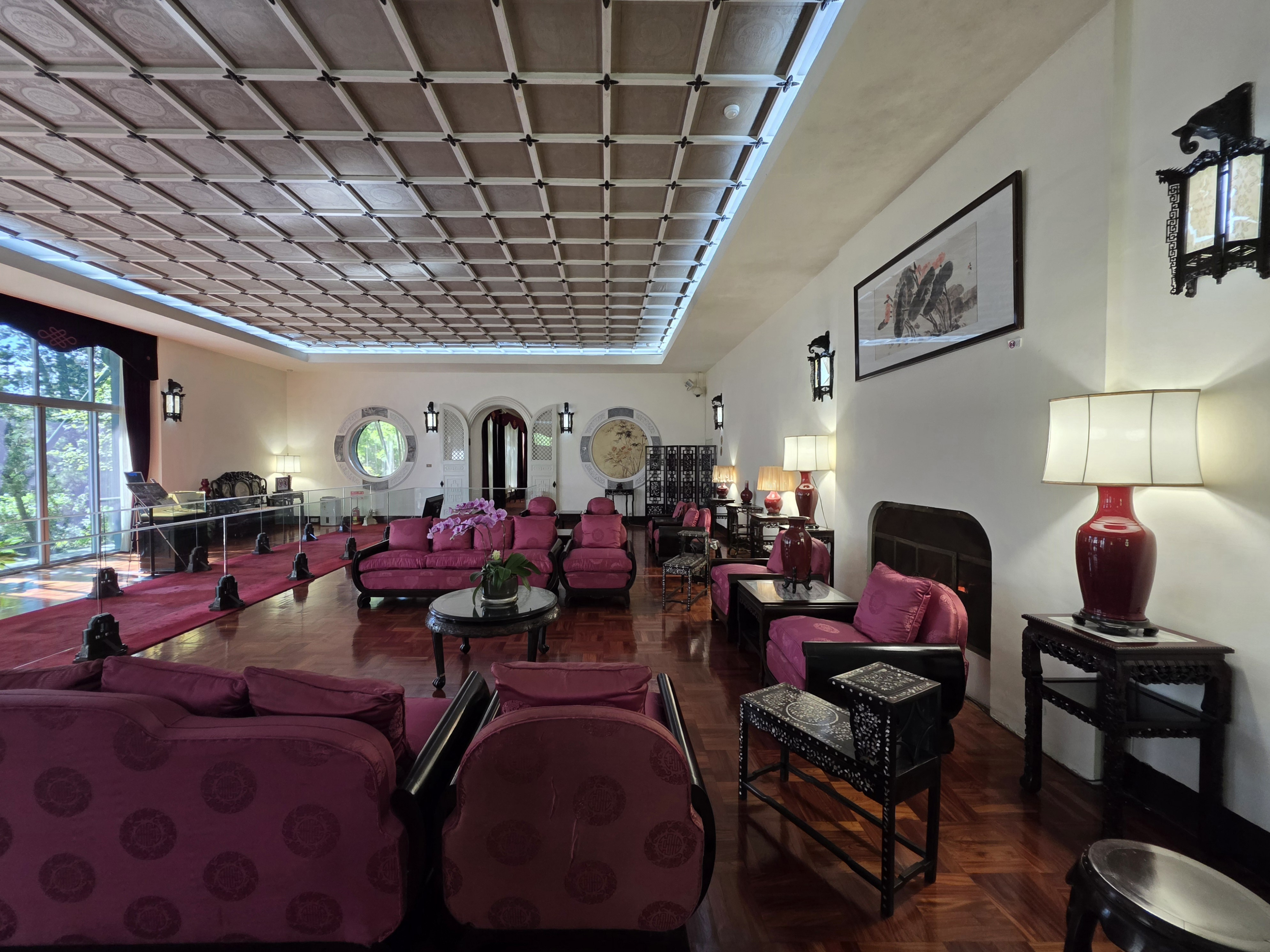
Large Living Room

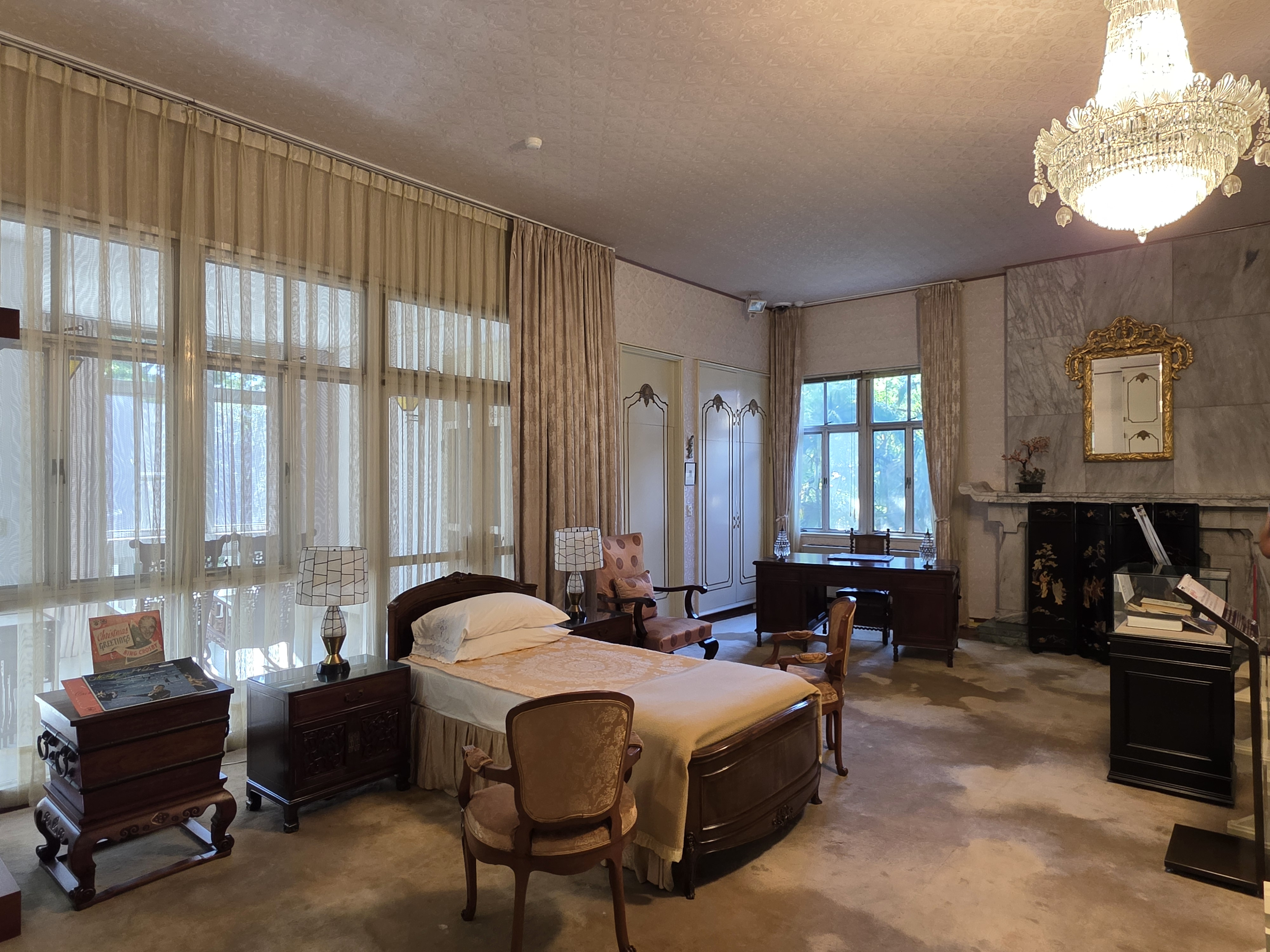
President Chiang's First Den

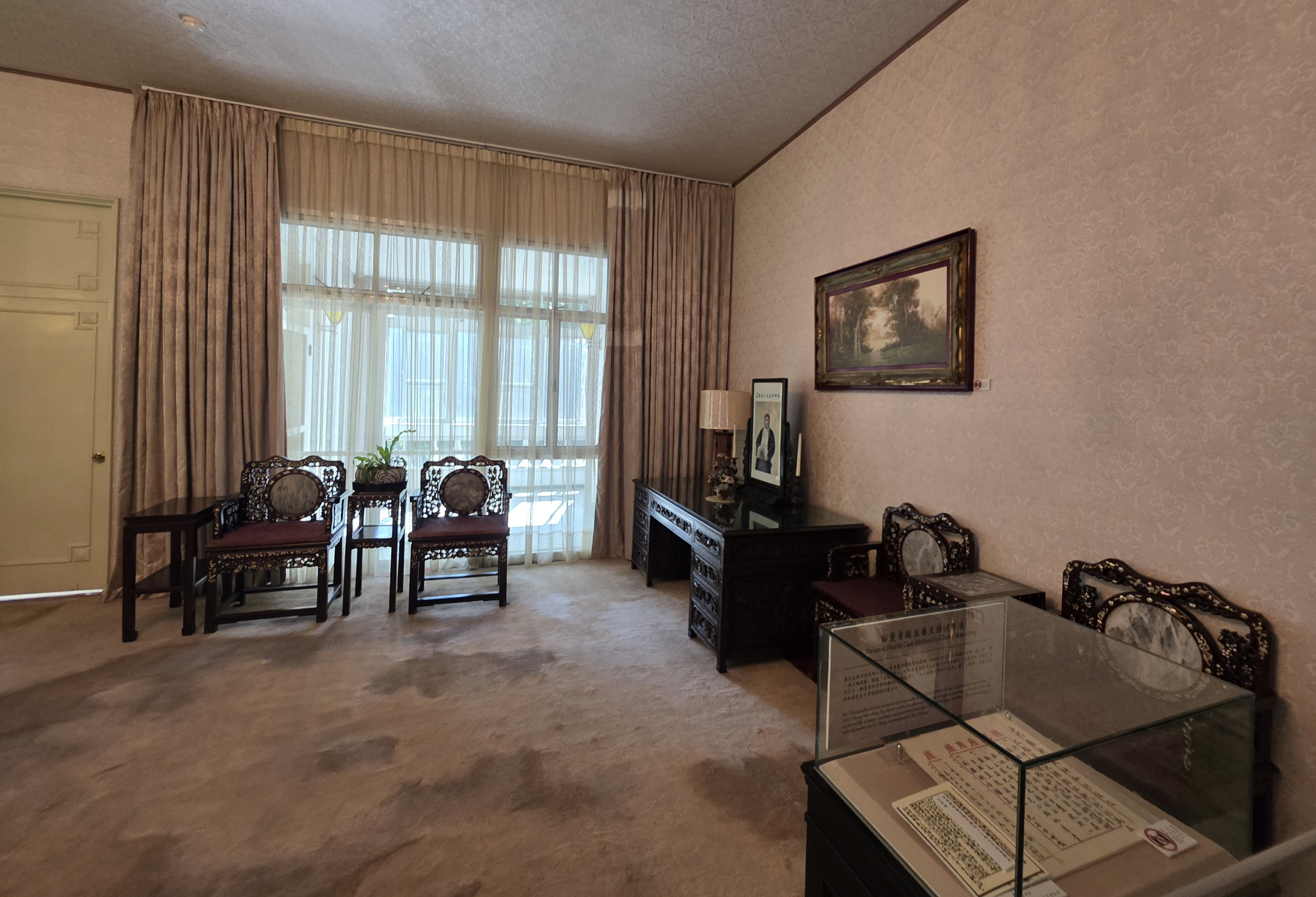
President Chiang's Second Den

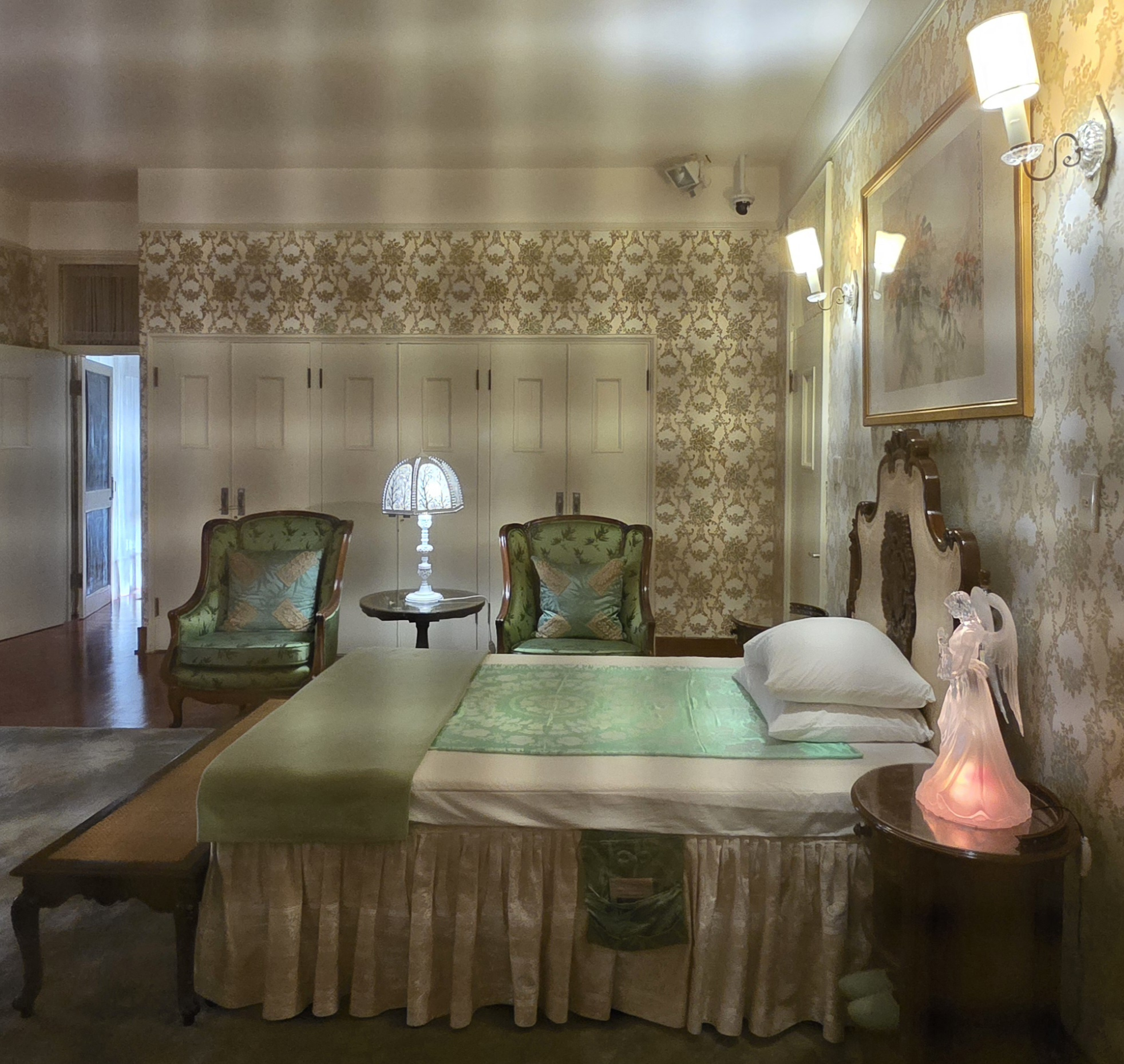
Madame Chiang's Bedroom

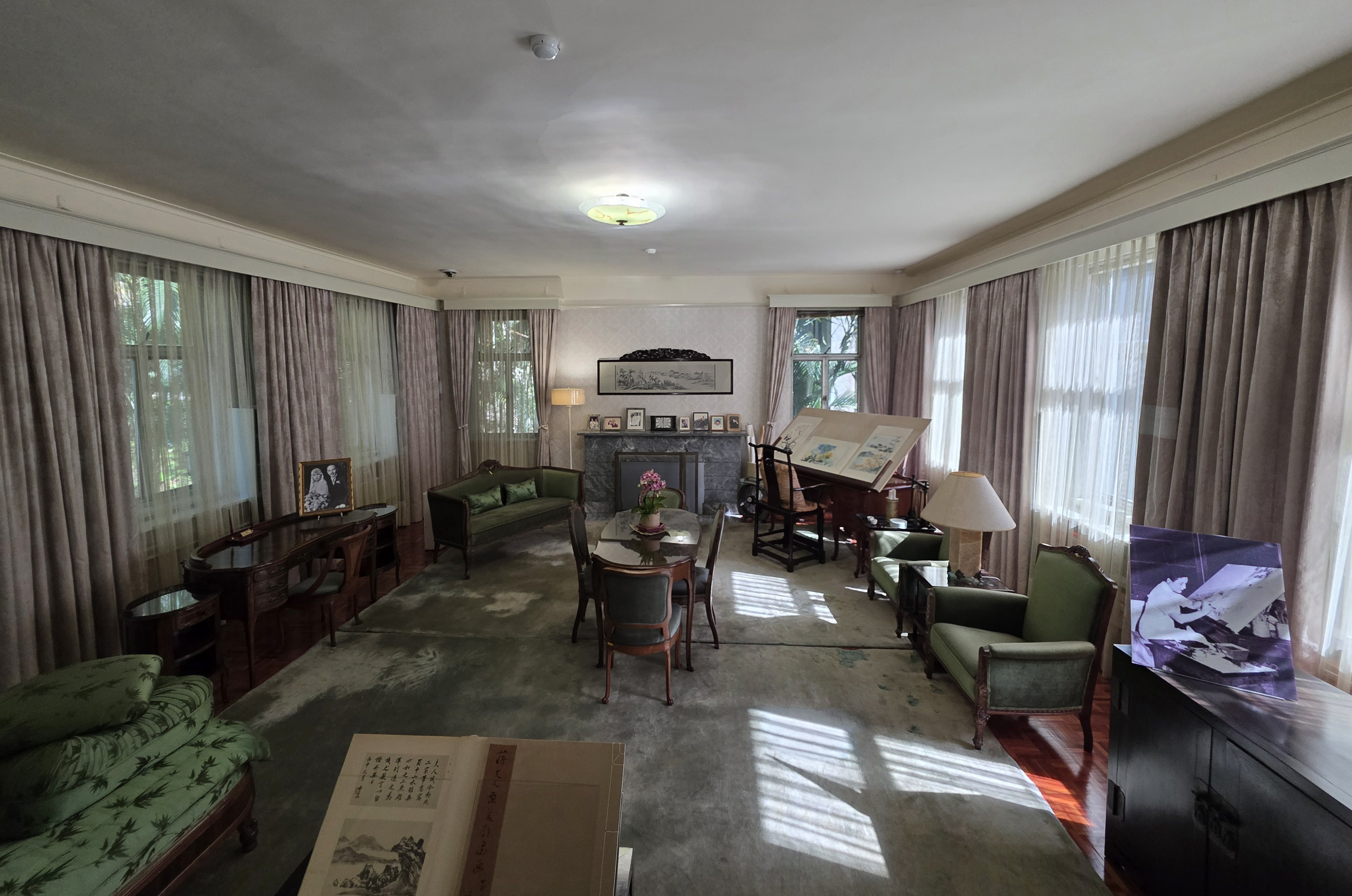
Madame Chiang's Studio

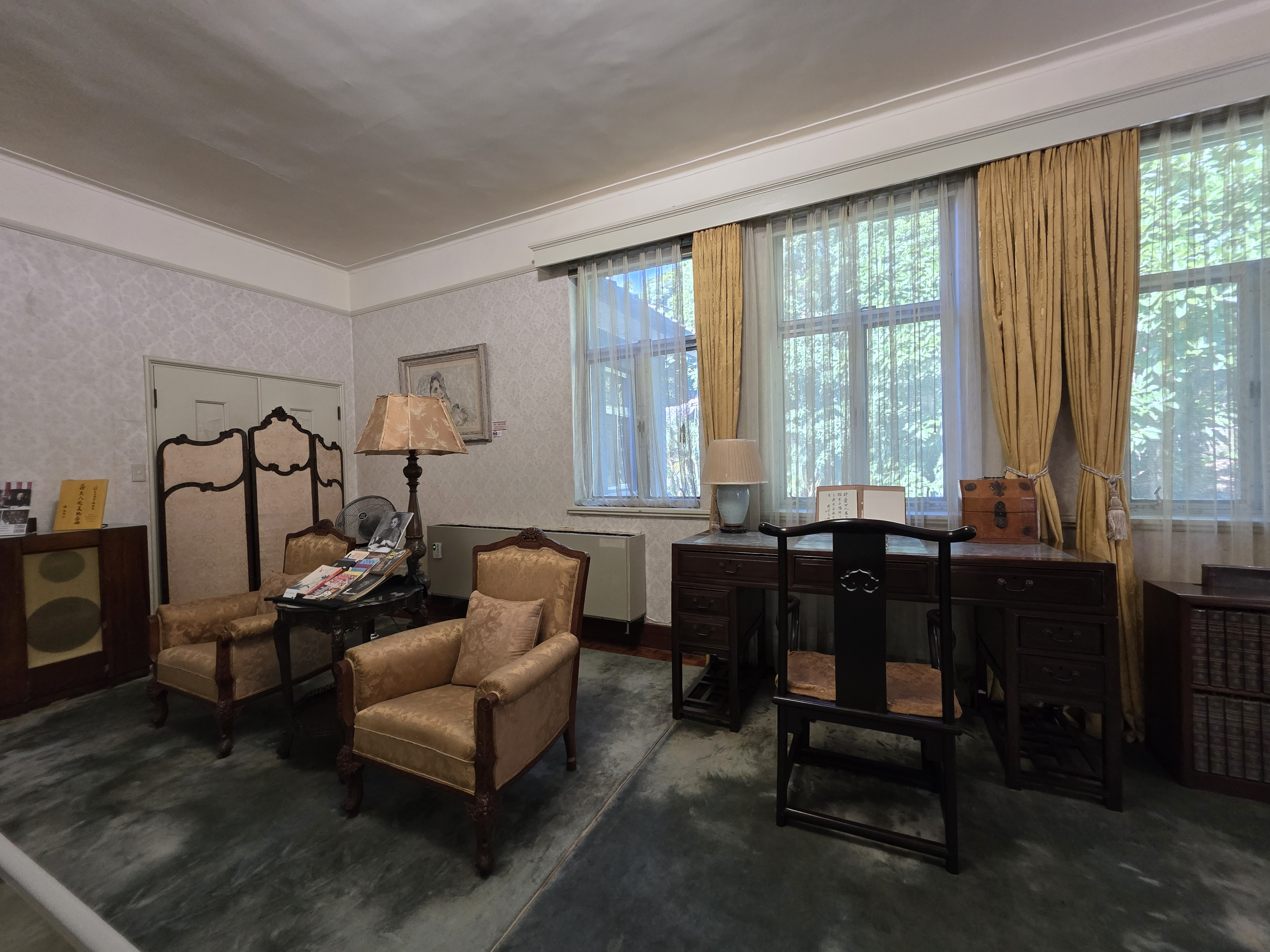
Madame Chiang's Study

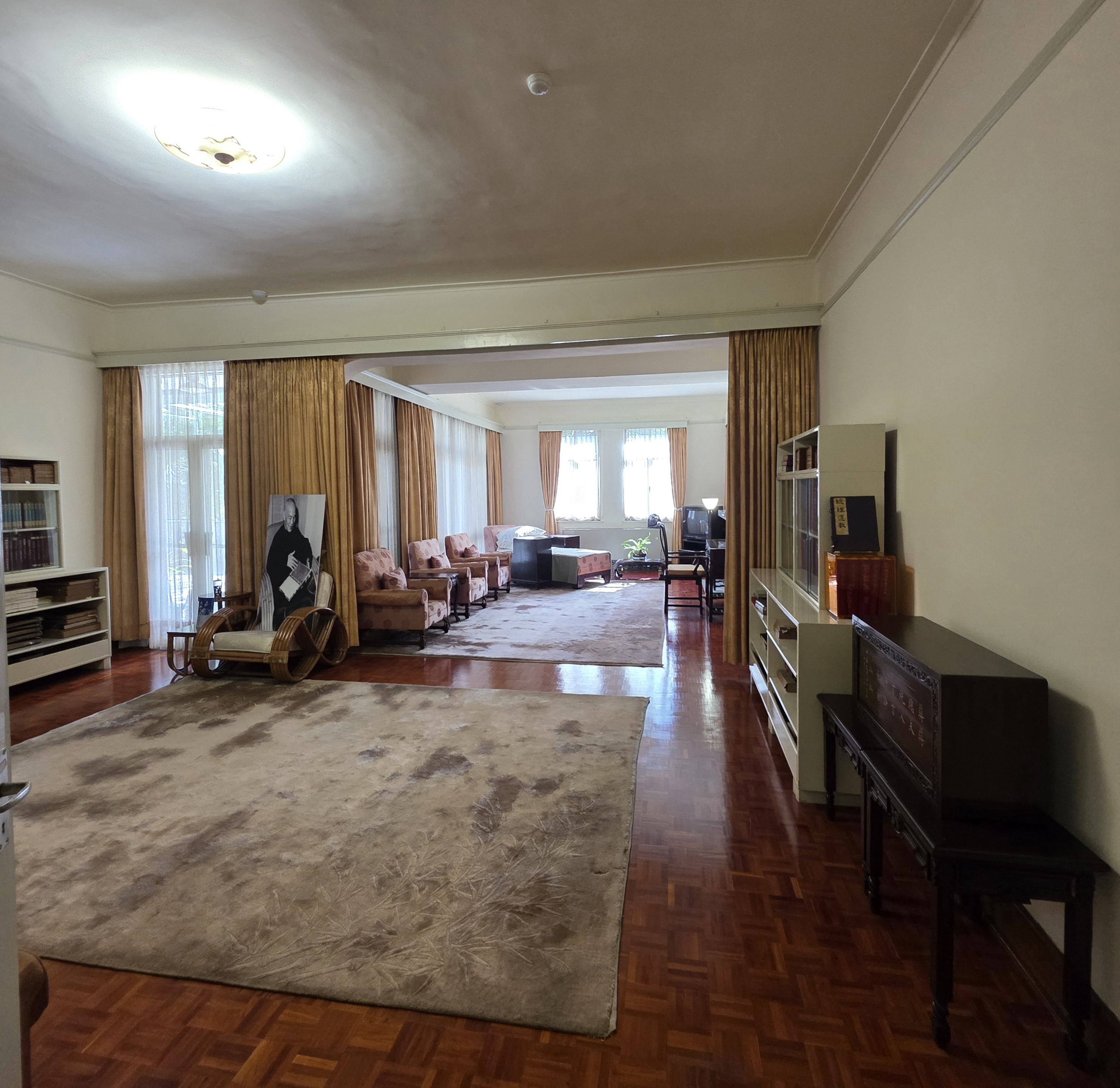
President Chiang's Study

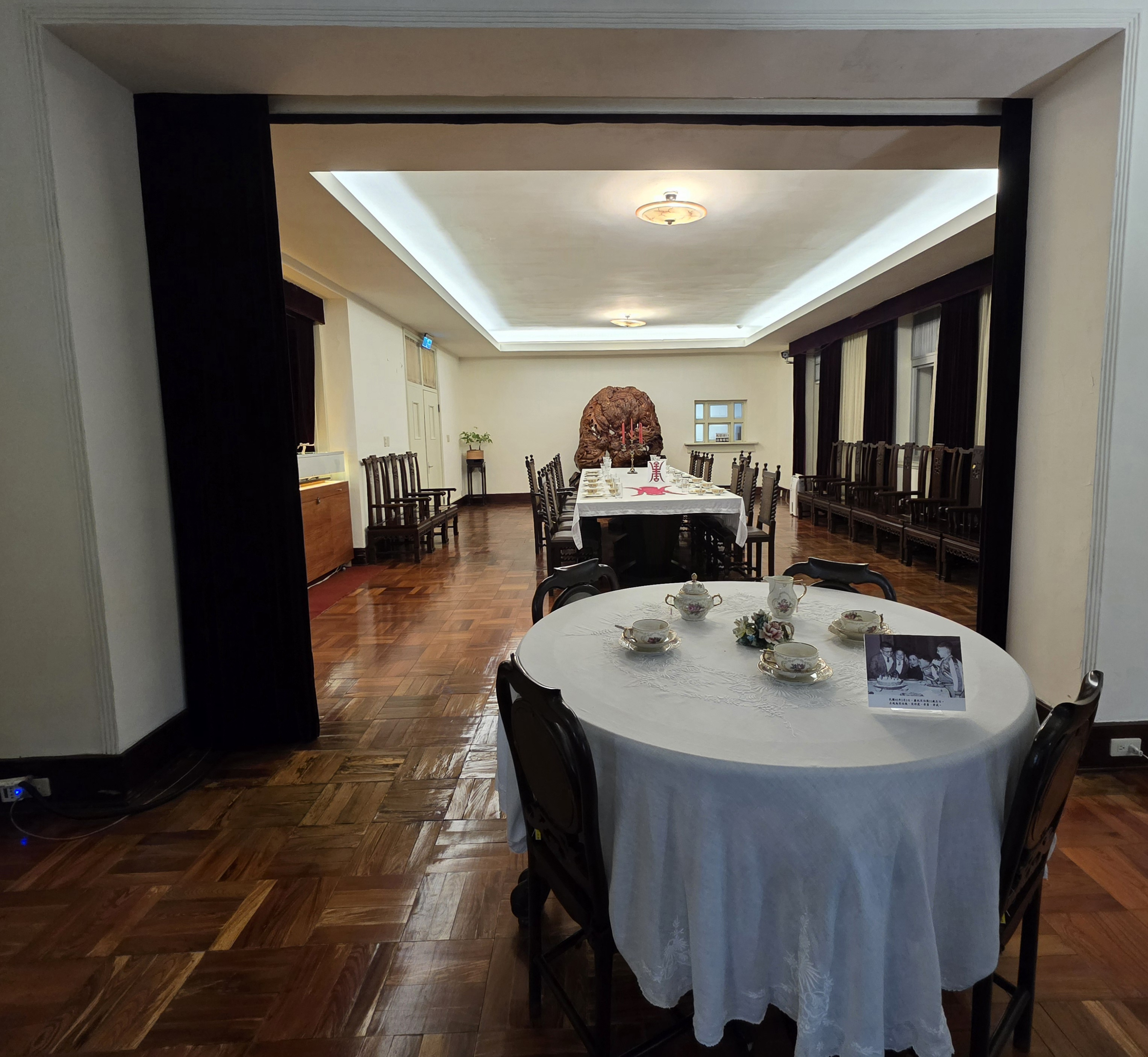
Banquet Hall

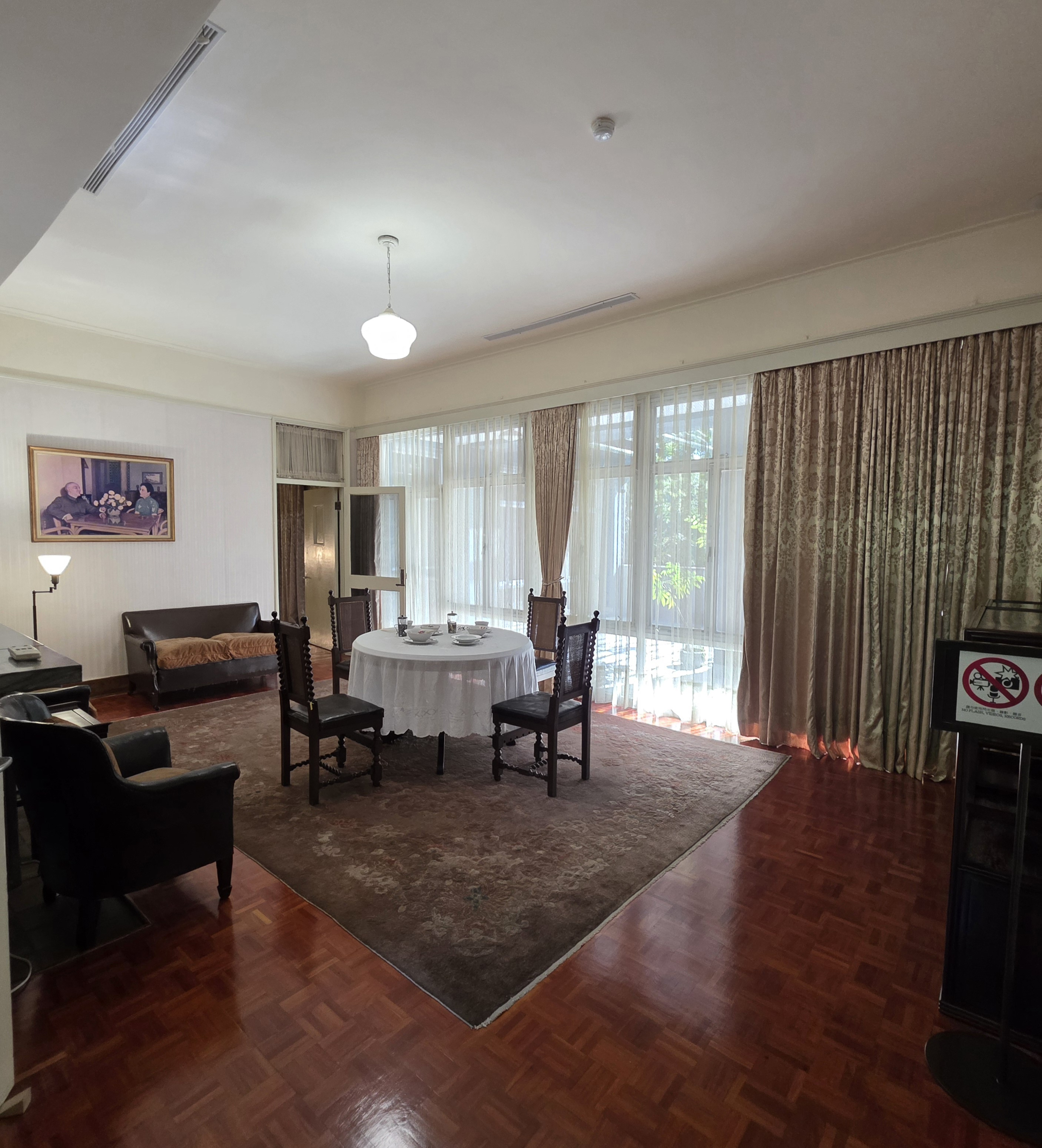
Dining Room

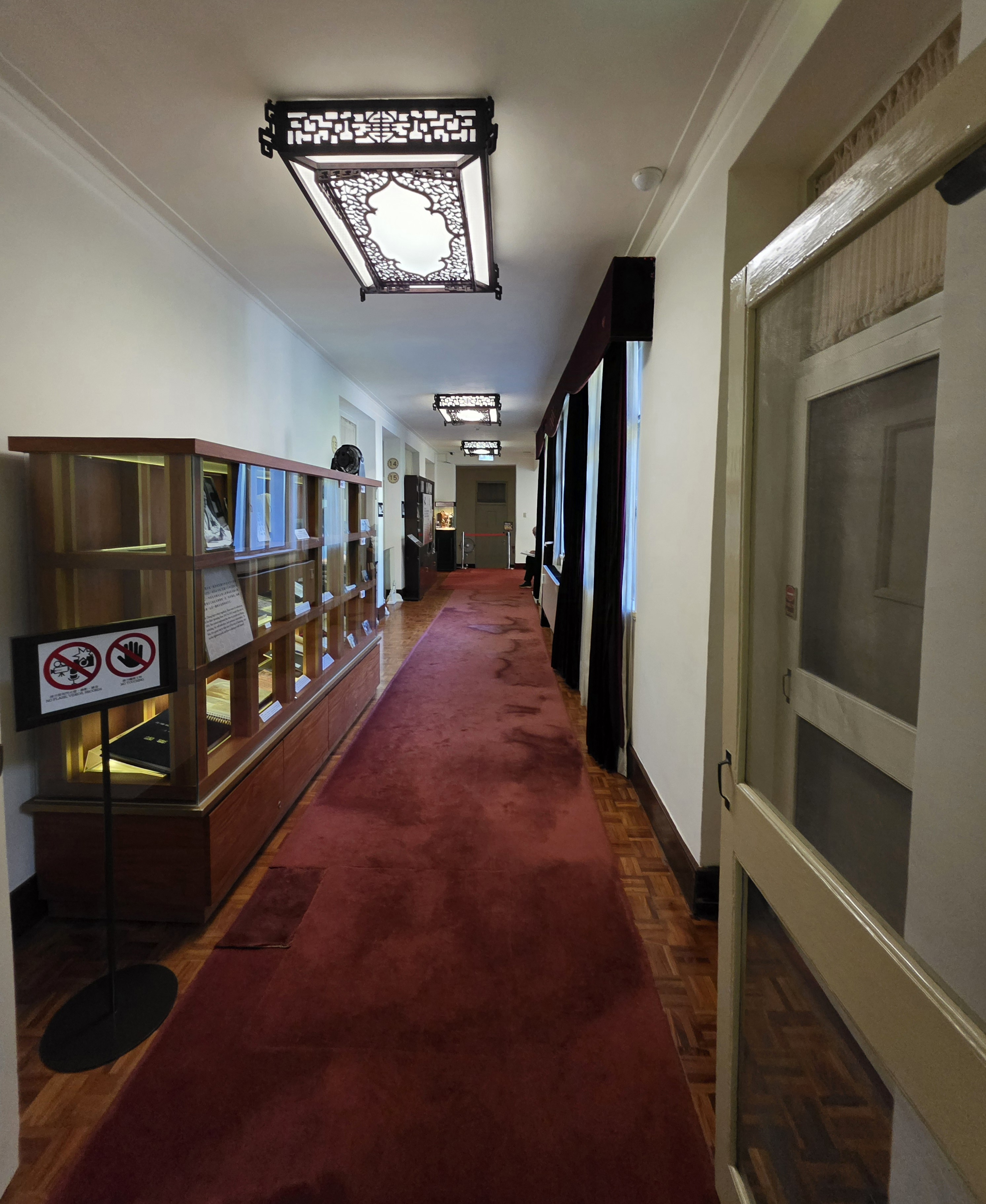
Corridor

== Transportation ==
The residence is within walking distance of Shilin Station on the Taipei Metro.

== See also ==
- Guesthouses of Chiang Kai-shek
  - Cihu Mausoleum
- Official Residence of the President (Republic of China)
  - Seven Seas Residence
- Chiang Kai-shek Memorial Hall
