= Seven Seas Residence =

Former presidential residence in Taiwan

Coordinates: 25°4′46.1″N 121°32′1.85″E

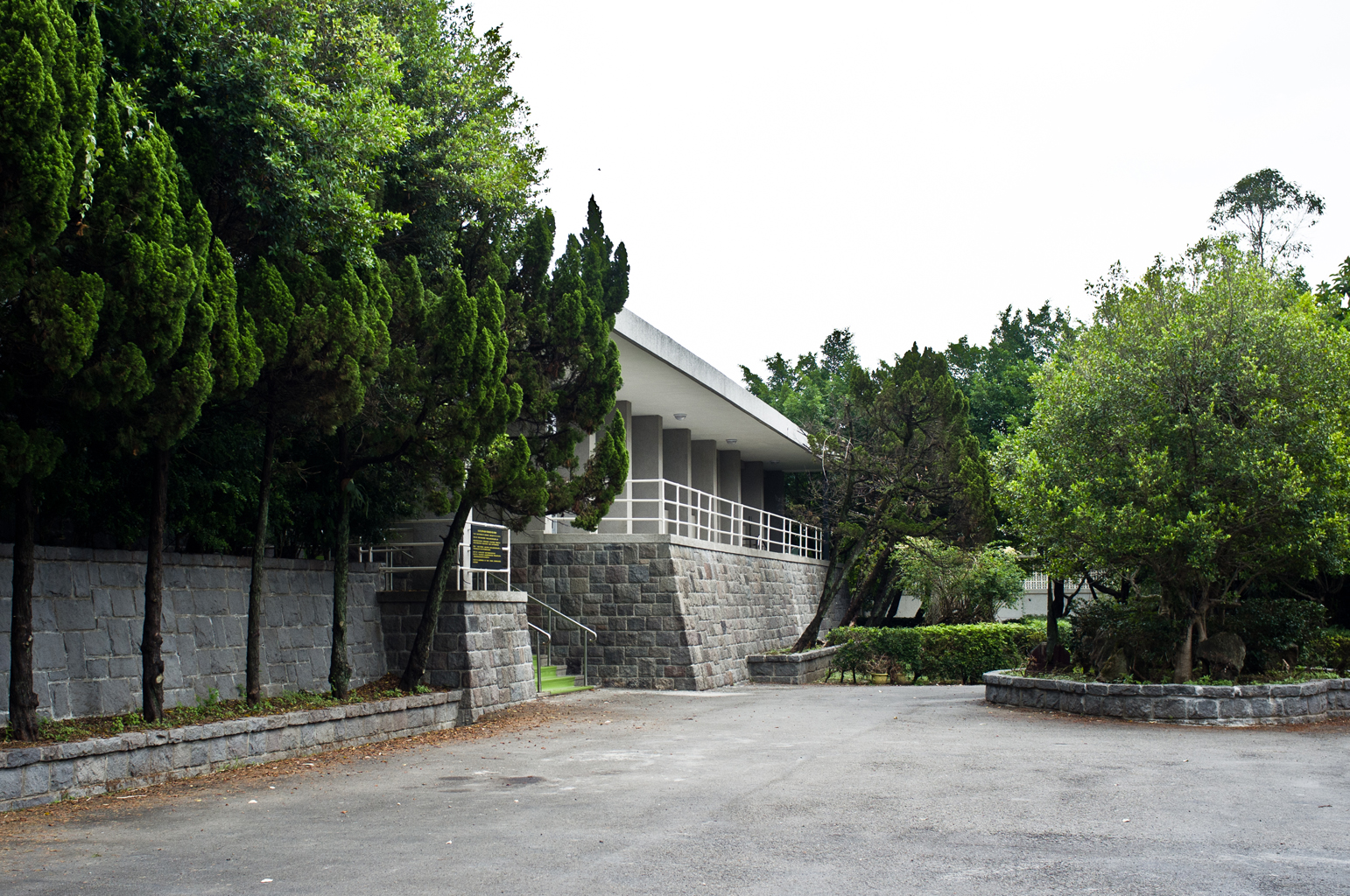
Seven Seas Residence

Seven Seas Residence (Chinese: 七海寓所; pinyin: Qīhǎi Yùsuǒ; Pe̍h-ōe-jī: Chhit-hái Gū-só͘ ; "Republic of China Navy Command Headquarters"), also called Chihai, located in Taipei, Taiwan on Beian Street within the grounds of the ROC naval headquarters, was the official residence of Republic of China President Chiang Ching-kuo.

== Name ==
The Residence is called Seven Seas because of the guardhouse code-named Seven Seas to recognize the contributions of the United States Seventh Fleet in protecting Taiwan during the First Taiwan Strait Crisis (1954-1955).

== History ==
It acted as a naval reception center in the 1950s. Chiang Ching-kuo originally lived in a Japanese style home on Chang'an East Road, but moved to the Seven Seas Residence in 1968. In 2022, the grounds were transformed into the Ching-kuo Chi-hai Cultural Park, including the Chiang Ching-kuo Presidential Library.

== See also ==
- Shilin Official Residence
- Official Residence of the President (Republic of China)
