= Vice Chairman of China =

Vice Chairman of China can refer to:

- Vice Chairman of the Chinese Communist Party (1956 to 1982)
- Vice Chairman of the People's Republic of China
- Vice Chairman of the Central Military Commission
- Vice Chairperson of the Standing Committee of the National People's Congress
- Vice Chairperson of the National Committee of the Chinese People's Political Consultative Conference
- Vice Chairman of the Central People's Government of the People's Republic of China (1949–1954)
- Vice Chairman of the National Government of the Republic of China
