= Presidential Office Building, Taipei =

Official workplace of the President of the Republic of China (Taiwan)

Presidential Office
- 總統府; Zǒngtǒngfǔ (Mandarin); Chóng-thóng-hú (Taiwanese); Chúng-thúng-fú (Hakka)

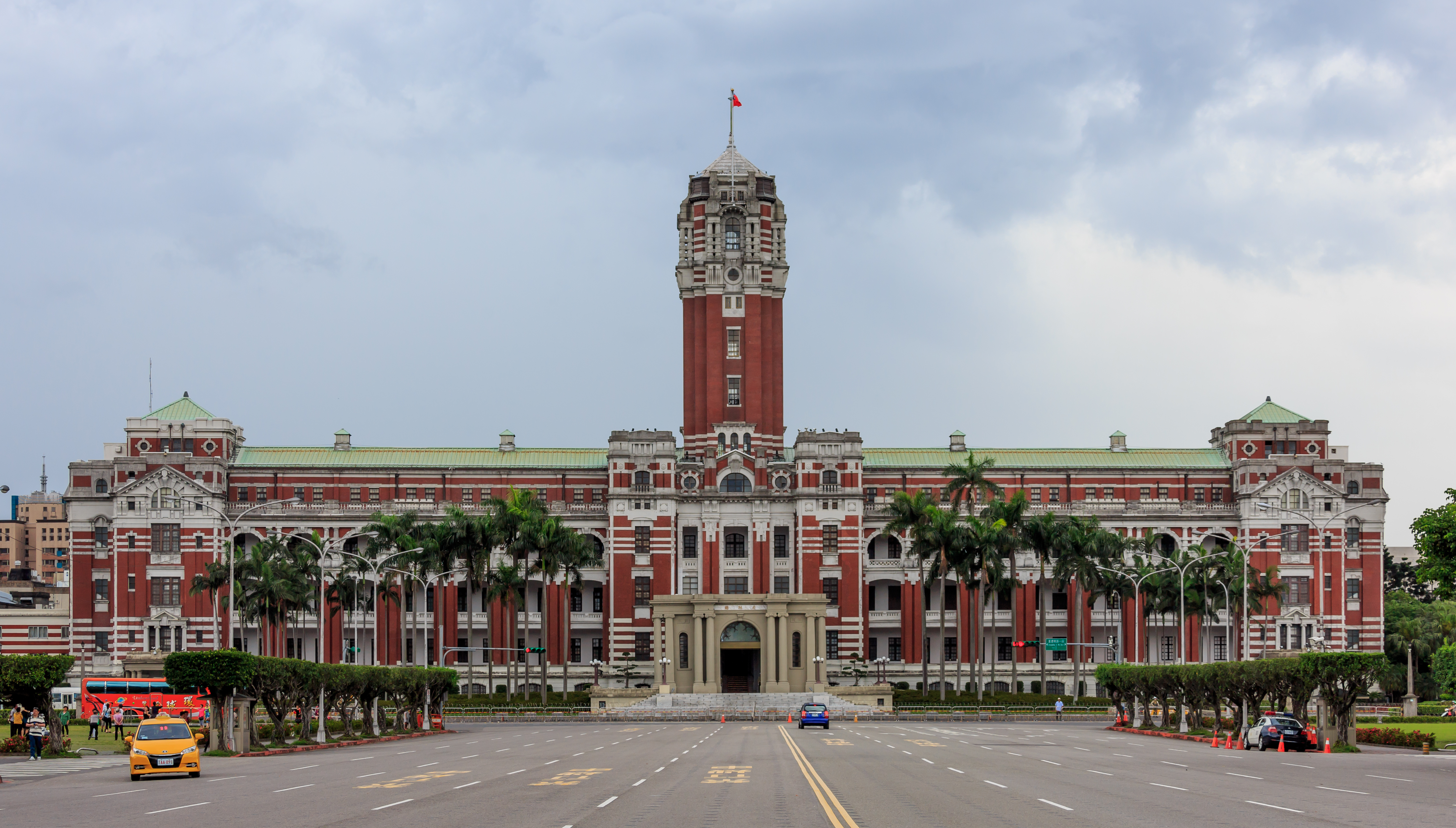
- The Presidential Office Building facade
- Former names: Government-General of Taiwan (臺灣總督府)
- Alternative names: Presidential Palace

General information
- Architectural style: Renaissance-baroque
- Location: Taipei, Taiwan, 122 Section 1 Chongqing South Road, Zhongzheng District
- Coordinates: 25°2′24″N 121°30′43″E
- Elevation: 8 m (26 ft)
- Current tenants: ROC President; ROC Vice President
- Construction started: 1 June 1912
- Completed: 31 March 1919
- Cost: JP¥2.8 million

Height
- Height: 60 m (200 ft)

Design and construction
- Architects: Uheiji Nagano (長野宇平治), Matsunosuke Moriyama

National monument of Taiwan
- Type: Government
- Designated: 30 July 1998

Office of the President

Chinese name
- Traditional Chinese: 中華民國總統府
- Simplified Chinese: 中华民国总统府
Transcriptions
Standard Mandarin
- Hanyu Pinyin: Zhōnghuá Mínguó Zǒngtǒngfǔ
- Bopomofo: ㄓㄨㄥ ㄏㄨㄚˊ ㄇㄧㄣˊ ㄍㄨㄛˊ ㄗㄨㄥˇ ㄊㄨㄥˇ ㄈㄨˇ
- Wade–Giles: Chung^{1}-hua^{2} Min^{2}-kuo^{2} Tsung^{3}-t'ung^{3}-fu^{3}
- Tongyong Pinyin: Jhonghuá Mínguó Zǒngtǒngfǔ
Hakka
- Pha̍k-fa-sṳ: Chûng-fà Mìn-koet Chúng-thúng-fú
Southern Min
- Hokkien POJ: Tiong-hoâ Bîn-kok Chóng-thóng-hú
- Tâi-lô: Tiong-huâ Bîn-kok Tsóng-thóng-hú
Eastern Min
- Fuzhou BUC: Dṳ̆ng-huà Mìng-guók Cūng-tūng-hū

Government-General of Taiwan
- Traditional Chinese: 臺灣總督府
Transcriptions
Hakka
- Pha̍k-fa-sṳ: Thòi-vân Chúng-tuk-fú
Southern Min
- Hokkien POJ: Tâi-oân Chóng-tok-hú
- Tâi-lô: Tâi-uân Tsóng-tok-hú

Japanese name
- Kana: たいわんそうとくふ
- Kyūjitai: 臺灣總督府
- Shinjitai: 台湾総督府
Transcriptions
- Romanization: Taiwan Sōtoku-fu

The Presidential Office Building is the official workplace of the president of the Republic of China on Taiwan. The building, located in the Zhongzheng District in the national capital — Taipei, was designed by architect Uheiji Nagano during the period of Japanese rule of Taiwan (1895–1945). The structure originally housed the Office of the Governor-General of Taiwan. The right wing of the building was damaged in Allied bombing during World War II, which was restored after the war by Chen Yi, the governor-general of Taiwan Province. It became the Presidential Office in 1950 after the government of the Republic of China lost control of mainland China and relocated the nation's capital to Taipei at the end of the Chinese Civil War. At present, this Baroque-style building is a symbol of the central government and a famous historical landmark in downtown Taipei.

== History ==
At the time Japanese rule of Taiwan and the Pescadores began in 1895, the governor-general of Taiwan set up temporary headquarters at the former Qing dynasty secretariat. The new rulers began making long-term plans for development of the island. The plans soon included building a new headquarters for the governor-general. A two-stage architectural design contest was held in 1906 and 1910.

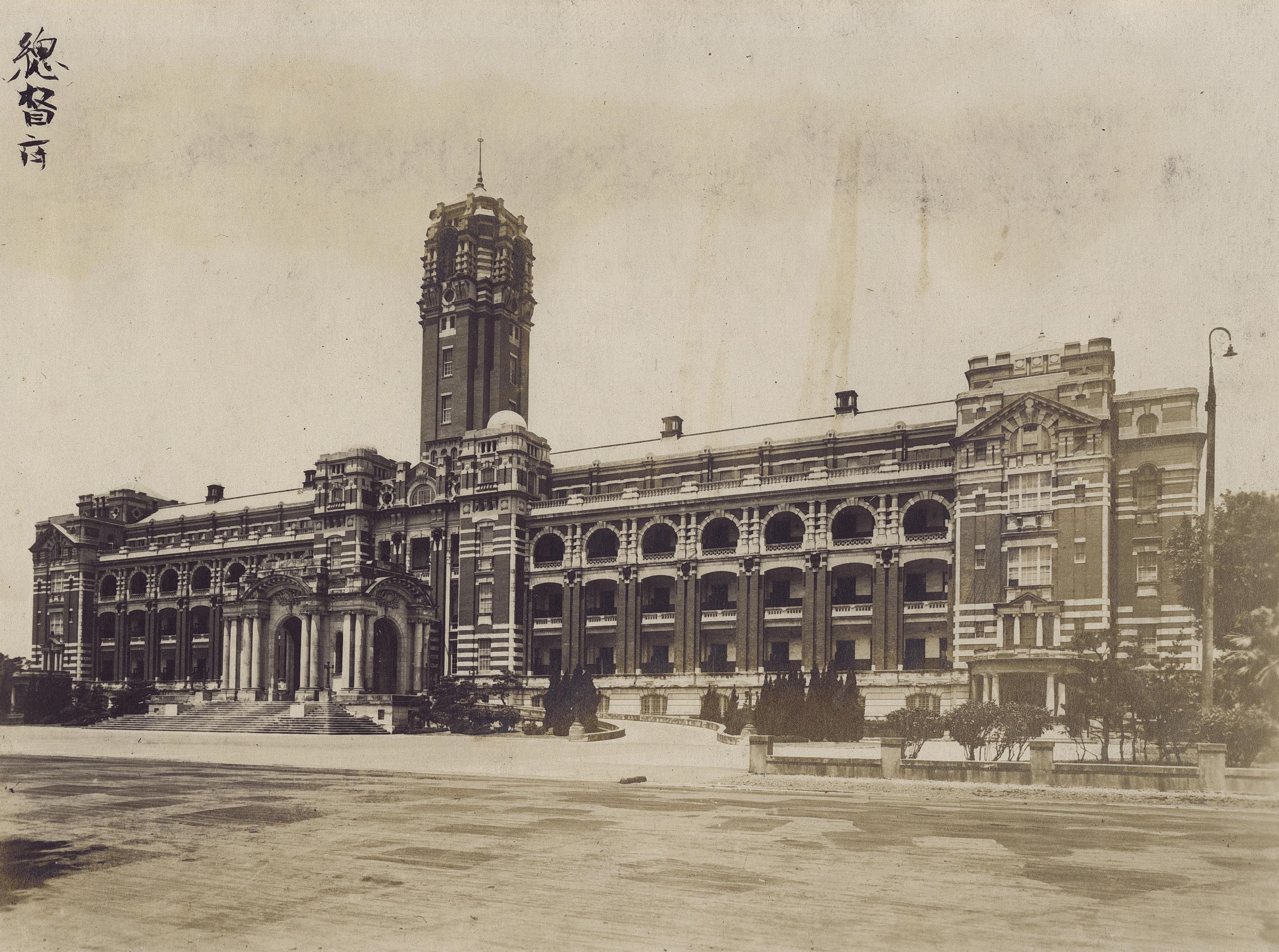
During the Japanese era, the building served as the office of the Governor General of Taiwan

The architectural design of Uheiji Nagano was selected in 1910. Aspects of the design typical of Japanese architects in Taiwan's colonial period include a façade facing east and a creative blend of traditional European elements (Renaissance, Baroque and neoclassical). Plans were submitted to Tokyo where revisions were made to Nagano's original design. Tokyo authorities increased the height of the initial six-story central tower to 11 stories and made defensive improvements to the defense and corner towers. Construction began on 1 June 1912 and was completed on 31 March 1919 at a cost of 2.8 million Japanese yen. It became one of the best-known buildings in Taiwan during the period of Japanese rule after construction finished.

During the Second World War, the building suffered heavy bombing from the Allied Powers and was severely damaged. On 31 May 1945, during the Raid on Taihoku, bombs hit the front left side, main lobby, and northern sections of the Taiwan Governor-General's Office. The fire burned for three days, damaging large parts of the building. Forty-five days after the air raid, Japan surrendered.

The building was not repaired until 1947, when the Taiwan Provincial Government initiated a restoration plan funded through private donations. The restoration involved approximately 81,000 workers and was completed at the end of 1948, looking only slightly different from the original building. Since the timing of the restoration's completion coincided with the 60th birthday of President Chiang Kai-shek, it was renamed Chieh Shou Hall. ("Chieh Shou" means "Long live Chiang Kai-shek".) Beginning in mid-1949, the building served as the southeast military affairs office and, following the retreat of the ROC central government from mainland China to Taiwan, it became the Office of the President in 1950. In 2006 the name Chieh Shou Hall was dropped. The structure is officially referred to in English simply as the Presidential Office Building. It was previously known as the Presidential Palace.

=== Chronology ===
- 1895 (June 5): Sukenori Kabayama, the first Japanese Governor-General of Taiwan, lands on the island and sets up a temporary office at Keelung.
- 1895 (June 14): Kabayama moves his office to the former Qing Dynasty Taiwan Provincial Administration Compound as part of his decision to move the seat of government to Taipei.
- 1905: a fire destroys the Office of the Governor-General.
- 1906-1919: design competitions for the new Governor-General's Office are held from 1906-1907 and the final design of the building is completed by architect Matsunosuke Moriyama. Construction begins in 1912 and is completed in 1919.
- 1945: the building is heavily damaged by Allied forces during the Raid on Taipei.
- 1946: the building undergoes extensive renovation and is renamed Chieh Shou Hall to celebrate the 60th birthday of President Chiang Kai-shek.
- 1950: the building houses the Office of the President after the ROC loses control of mainland China.
- 1987: President Chiang Ching-kuo signs decree ending martial law in the reception room.
- 1998: the building is declared a historic national monument by Ministry of the Interior.
- 2006: the designation of the building is formally changed from "Chieh Shou Hall" to "Presidential Office Building."
- 2014: a truck slammed into the main gate of the Presidential Office Building.
- 2015: a replica of the Presidential Office Building was seen during a People's Liberation Army exercise in Inner Mongolia.
- 2017: a man attacked a building guard with sword stolen from the Republic of China Armed Forces Museum.
- 2024: the building hosts Taiwan's first tabletop exercise simulating a cross-strait crisis.

== Architecture ==
The Presidential Office Building occupies the city block between Chongqing South Road and Bo'ai Road in downtown Taipei. It is designed in the shape of two squares stretching from Baoqing Road to Guiyang Street.

The 130 meter-wide facade faces east down multi-lane Ketagalan Boulevard. This reflects the concerns of its Japanese architects, who often oriented important structures toward the rising sun at the head of long avenues. (This feature may also be seen in Main Library of National Taiwan University.)

The building has ten entrances but only the front entrance and west gate are used for official functions. In the original design an ornate Baroque-style domed entrance hall greeted visiting dignitaries. This entrance hall was reconstructed with simpler interior features after destruction of the first hall in World War II. The west gate, the formal rear entrance of the building, features a grand marble staircase and porch lined with Ionic and Corinthian pillars.

The two-part main building, six stories high, mainly houses government offices and maintenance services. The office wings feature balconies and long corridor that allow view of the sunlit North and South Gardens.

The 60-meter tower at the center of the building was the tallest structure in the Taipei Basin during Japanese rule. When the Nationalist regime took power, a platform was built at the top floor to enable martial flag-raising ceremonies.

The Presidential Office Building stands within walking distance of the Judicial Yuan Building, 228 Memorial Park, the National Taiwan Museum, the original hospital of the National Taiwan University, the original East Gate of the City of Taipei, the Chang Yung Fa Foundation Building (formerly Kuomintang Party Headquarters) and the National Theater and Concert Hall at Chiang Kai-shek Memorial Hall. A few blocks to the west is Taipei's popular Ximending shopping district with its historic cinema and Zhongshan Hall. A few blocks to the north is Taipei Main Station and Shin Kong Life Tower.

== Access ==
The building is accessible within walking distance South West from NTU Hospital Station of the Taipei Metro.

Former President Chen Shui-bian revealed that the grounds of the Shilin Official Residence contain the entrance to a hidden tunnel that connects to the Presidential Office Building.

In 2019, Taiwan’s Presidential Office Building, in collaboration with the General Association of Chinese Culture (GACC), organized a program called 'Spend A Night at Taiwan’s Presidential Office Building,' allowing international guests to visit and stay overnight at the building. Ten groups of participants from 11 countries were selected. The event was held again in 2023, and 15 groups of participants were selected from 12 countries.

== Gallery ==
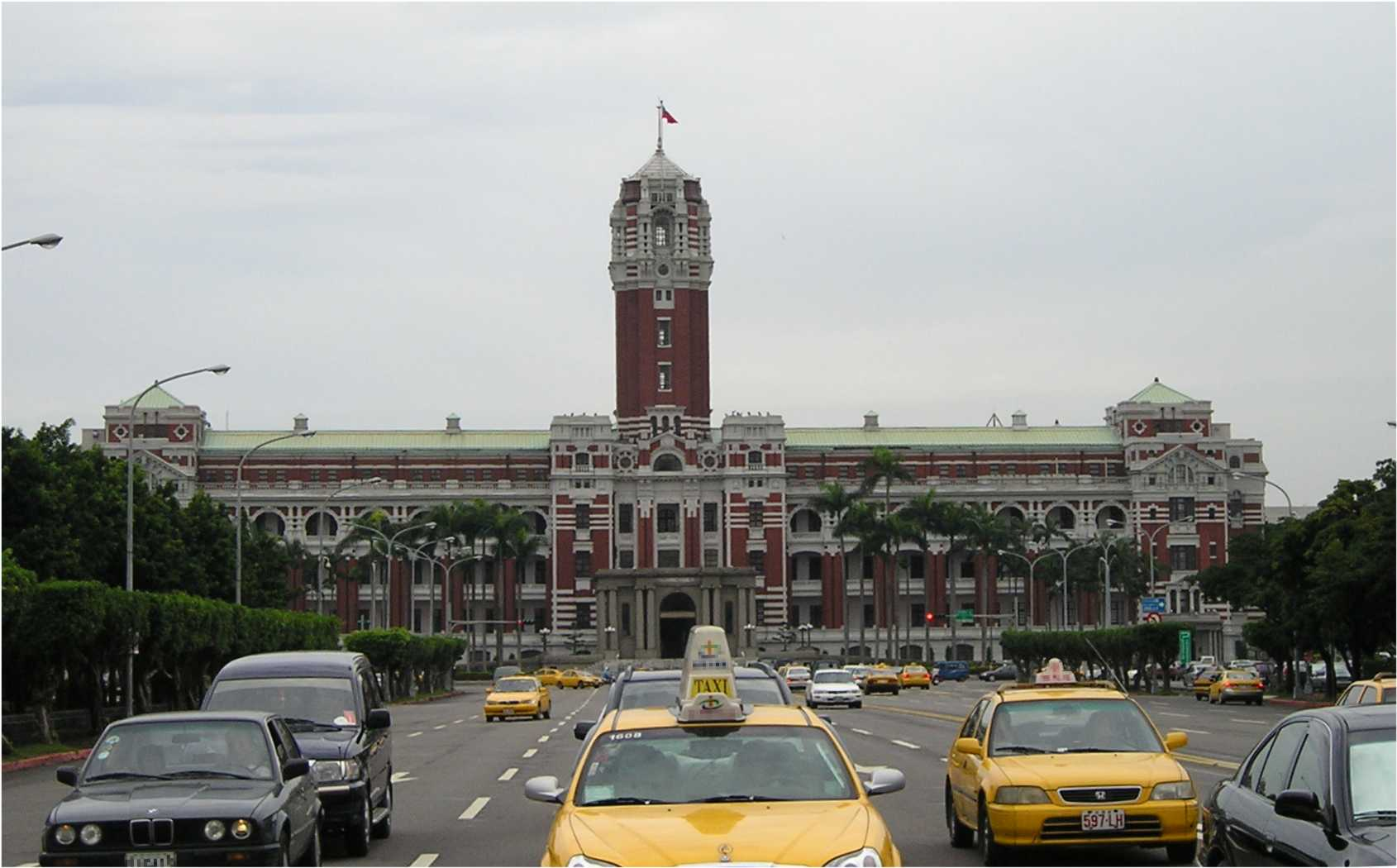
Front of the Presidential Office Building as seen from Ketagalan Boulevard

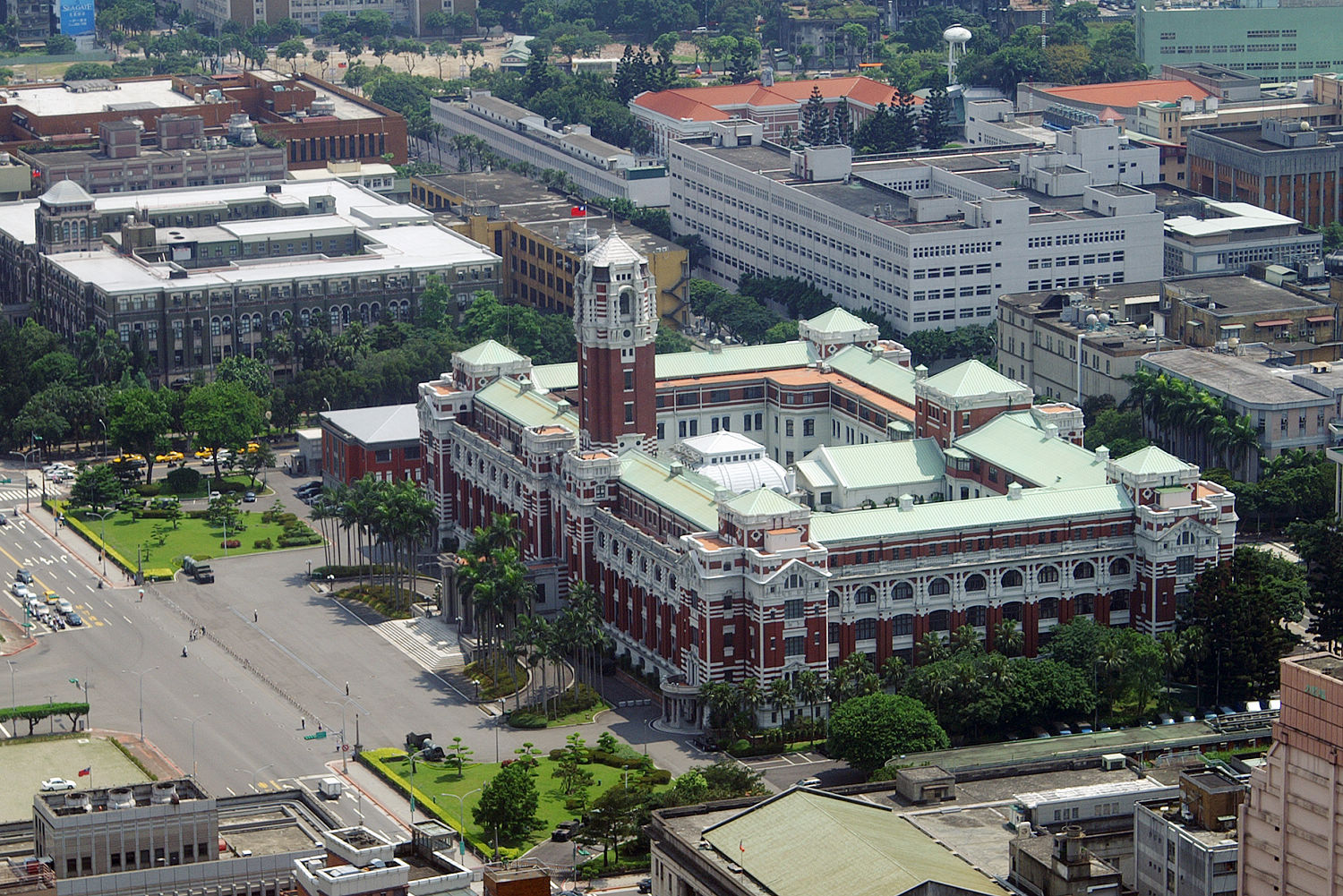
The Presidential Office Building is in the Zhongzheng District of Taipei.

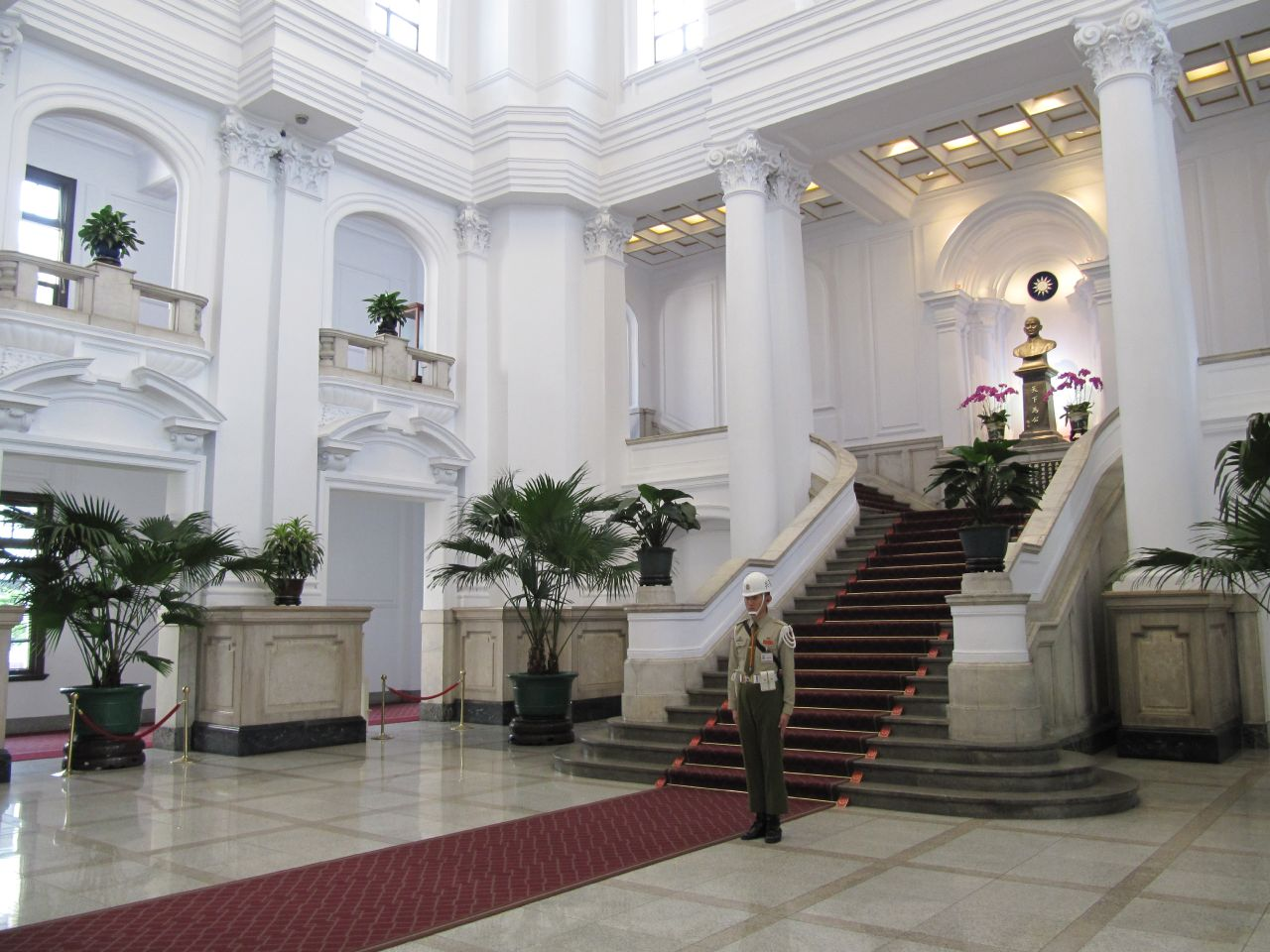
The main staircase in the Presidential Office Building being guarded by Republic of China Military Police

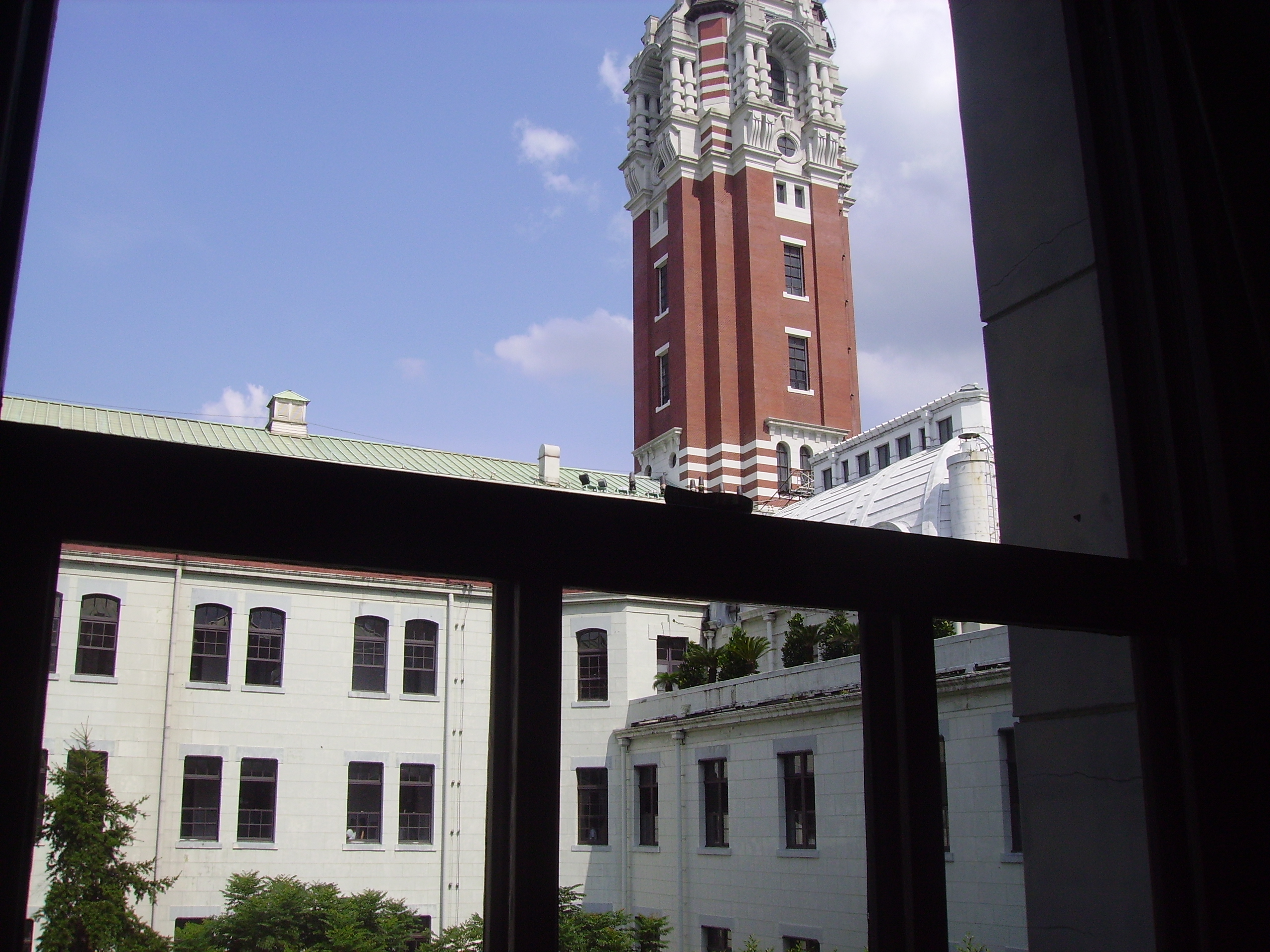
The internal courtyard of the Presidential Office Building.

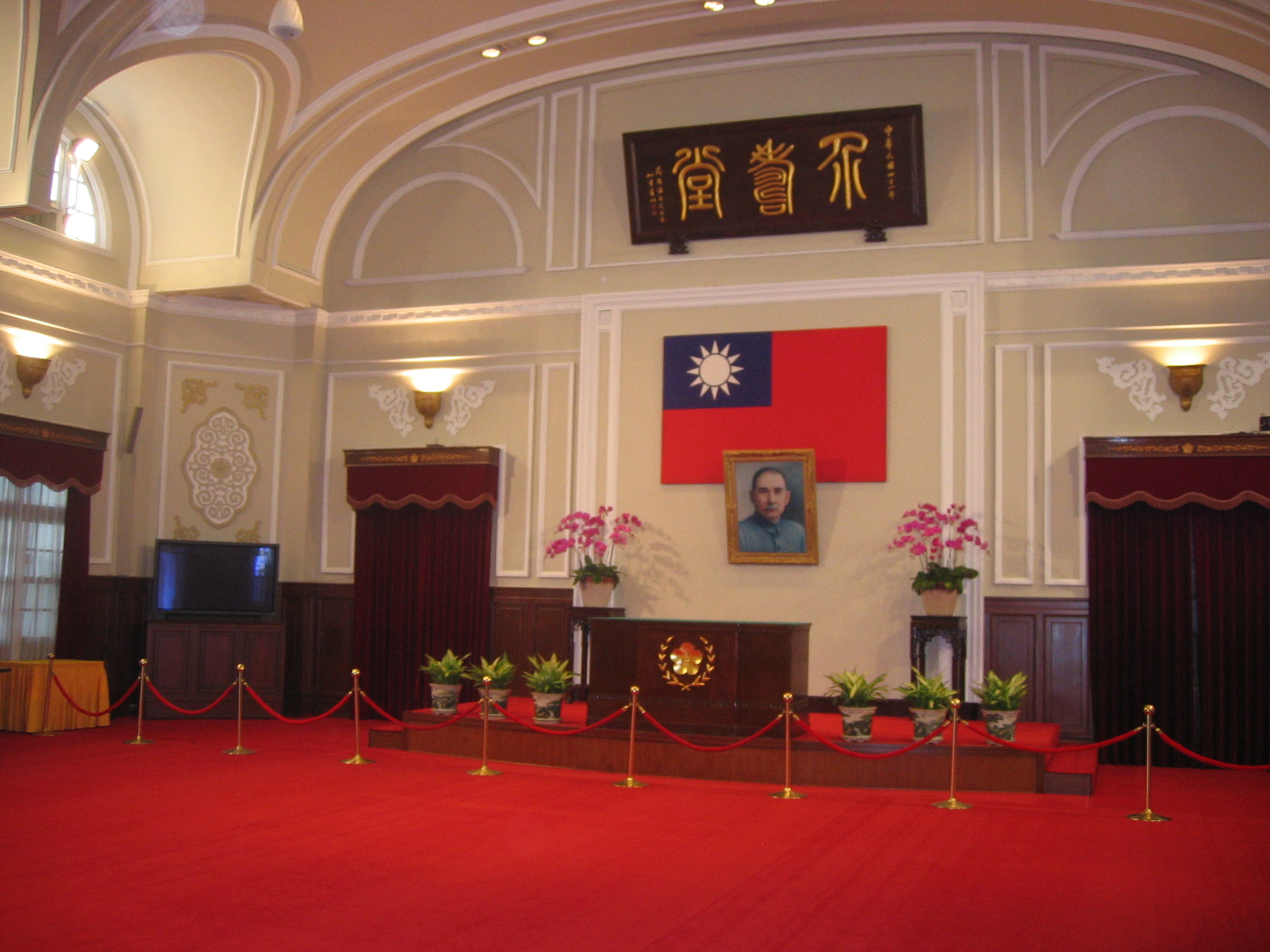
Ching-kuo Hall in the Presidential Building is used to hold receptions, including presidential inaugurations.

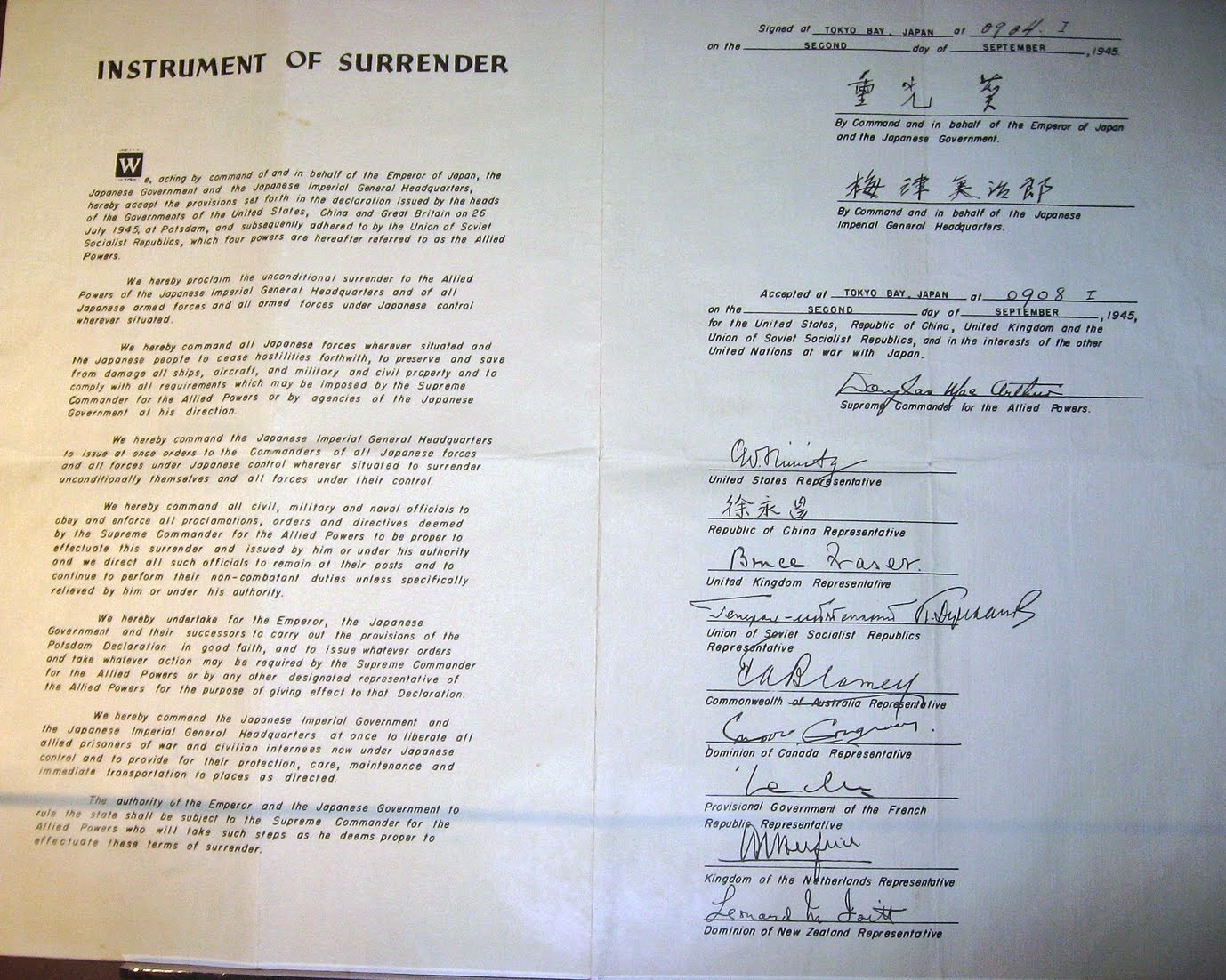
Original Japanese Instrument of Surrender from World War II on display.

== See also ==
- Presidential and Vice-Presidential Artifacts Museum
- History of the Republic of China
- President of the Republic of China
- Governor-General of Taiwan
- Japanese General Government Building, Seoul
- Presidential Palace (Nanjing)
- Official Residence of the President (Republic of China)
