= Premier of China (disambiguation) =

The Premier of China is the head of government of the People's Republic of China.

Premier of China may also refer to:

- Grand chancellor (China) of the Imperial China until 1380
- Prime Minister of the Imperial Cabinet of the Qing dynasty (1911–1912)
- Premier of Taiwan (since 1912)

== See also ==
- List of premiers of China
- Prime Minister of China (disambiguation)
