= Vice President of the Republic of China =

Deputy head of state

Vice President of the Republic of China (Taiwan)
- 中華民國副總統
- National Emblem of Taiwan

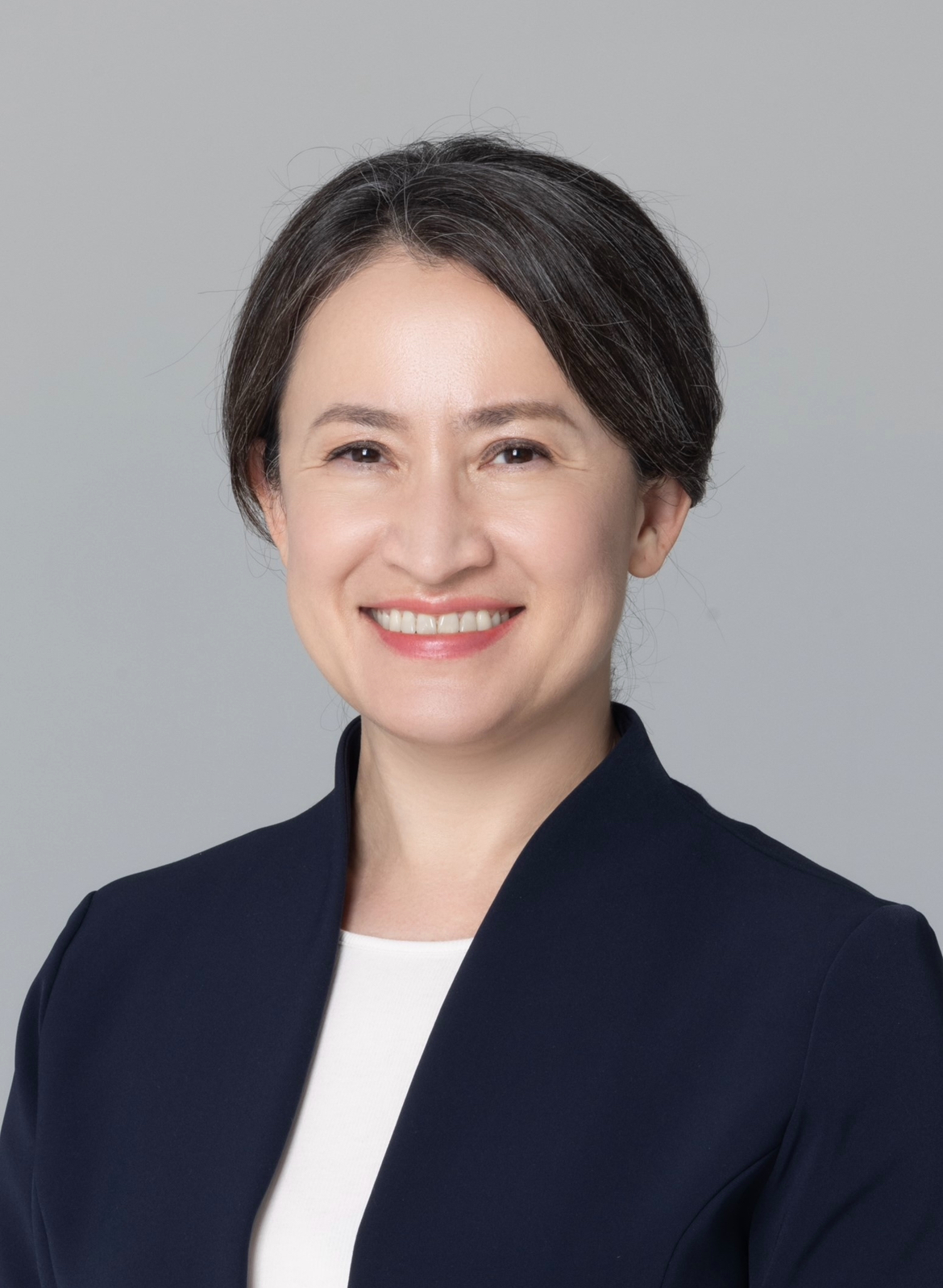
- Incumbent; Hsiao Bi-khim since 20 May 2024
- Office of the President
- Style: Ms Vice President (informal); Her Excellency (diplomatic)
- Member of: National Security Council
- Residence: Anping Residence
- Seat: Presidential Office, Taipei
- Appointer: Direct election
- Term length: 4 years; renewable once
- Formation: 20 May 1948; 78 years ago
- First holder: Li Zongren
- Unofficial names: Vice President of Taiwan
- Salary: NTD 398,270 monthly (2024)
- Website: english.president.gov.tw

The vice president of the Republic of China, commonly referred to as the vice president of Taiwan, is the second-highest constitutional office of the government in Taiwan, after the president, and ranks first in the presidential line of succession.

== Powers ==
Under Article 49 the Constitution of the Republic of China, in case the office of the president should become vacant, the vice president shall succeed until the expiration of the original presidential term. In case the office of both the president and the vice president should become vacant, the president of the Executive Yuan shall act for the president. In case the president should be unable to attend to office due to any cause, the vice president shall act for the president. In case both the president and the vice president should be unable to attend to office, the President of the Executive Yuan shall act for the president. Under the original constitution, the office of vice president remains vacant for the remainder of the term after the vice president succeeds as president; however, under the Additional Articles of the Constitution of the Republic of China, if the vice presidency becomes vacant for any reason, the Legislative Yuan would elect a new vice president from among candidates nominated by the president.

Aside from succeeding the president in the case of death, resignation, or impeachment of the president, and acting as president in the event the president becomes incapacitated, the vice president holds little formal power in the government.

Until 1996, the vice president was elected by the National Assembly of the Republic of China. Beginning in the 1996 election, the vice president has been elected through a direct popular vote of citizens with household registration in the "Free Area of the Republic of China", on the same ticket as the president.

== Precedents ==
Two vice presidents have succeeded to the presidency upon the death of the president. Yen Chia-kan became president in 1975 upon the death of President Chiang Kai-shek, and Lee Teng-hui became president in 1988 upon the death of President Chiang Ching-kuo. Yen stepped down as president three years later in favor of Chiang Ching-kuo.

Another, Li Zongren, formally acted as president from 21 January 1949 to 1 March 1950. President Chiang Kai-shek had resigned amid heavy losses during the Chinese Civil War, but was unclear on whether he was resigning permanently, or simply wished to step down temporarily. Chiang remained as Director-General of the Kuomintang and continued to give orders to the army as if he were in control. Amid this power struggle, Li left for medical treatment in the United States in November 1949, following the fall of the temporary capital of Chongqing to capital forces, where he was accepted as a foreign head of state. Chiang retreated to Chengdu and finally moved the government to Taiwan in December 1949, acting as the de facto leader until formally "resuming" his duties the next March. Li would nominally remain as vice president in absentia until 1954, until being impeached by the Control Yuan for "failure to carry out duties due to illegal conduct."

Due to the relative lack of formal power of the position, it has been coupled in the past with the office of the premier of the Republic of China. Vice presidents Chen Cheng, Yen Chia-kan, and Lien Chan all served as premier concurrently as vice president during part of their terms, and vice president Annette Lu has at times been mentioned as a possible candidate for premiership.

== Insignia ==
The standard of the vice president of the Republic of China was instituted in the Act of Ensign of the Republic of China Navy. The insignia was abolished with the invalidation of the act on 3 January 1986.

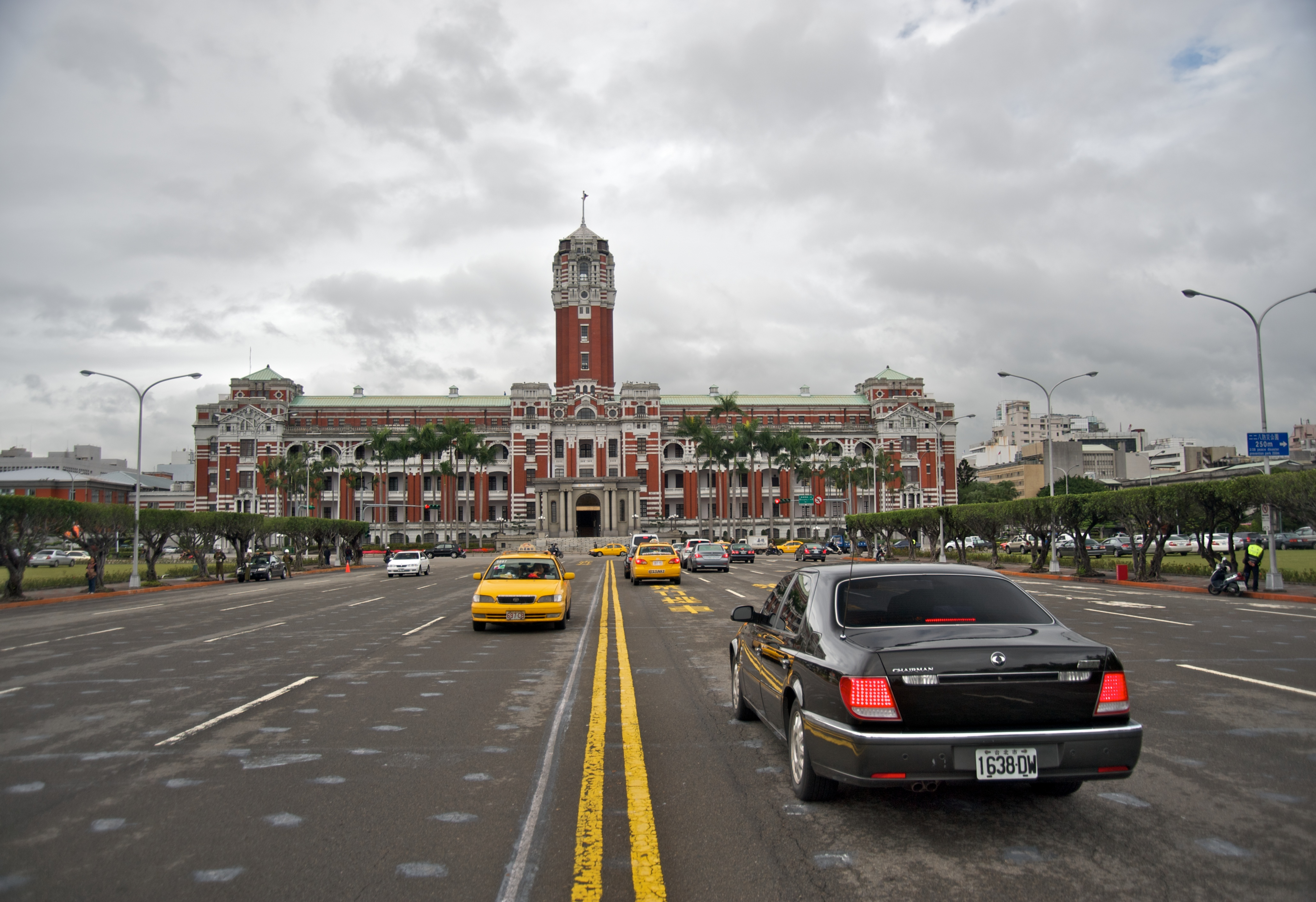
The Presidential Office of the Republic of China, located in Taipei, Taiwan, also houses the office of the vice president.

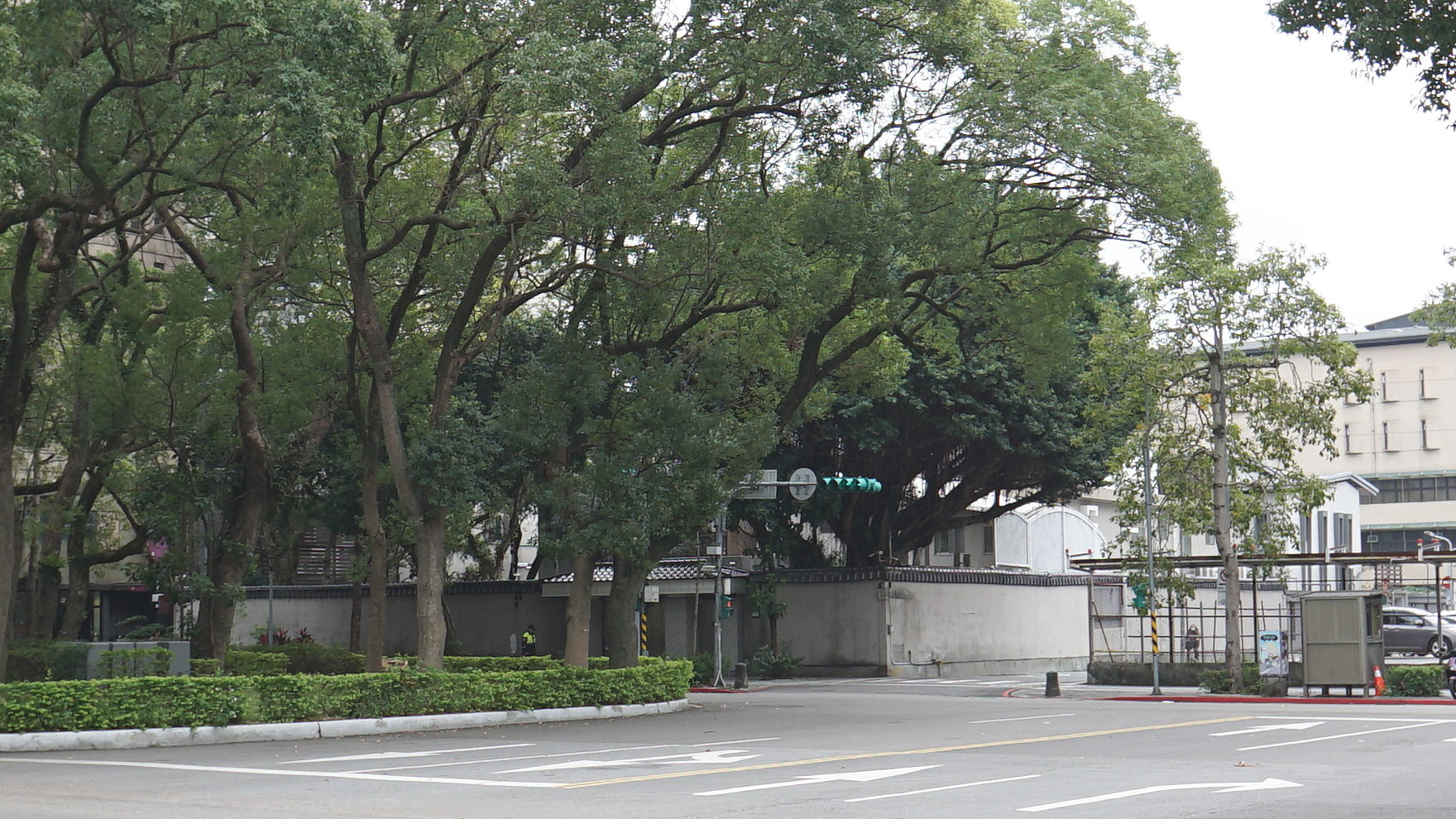
Official Residence of the Vice President, located in Daan District, Taipei.
