= Renaming of Chiang Kai-shek Memorial Hall =

2007 controversy in Taiwan

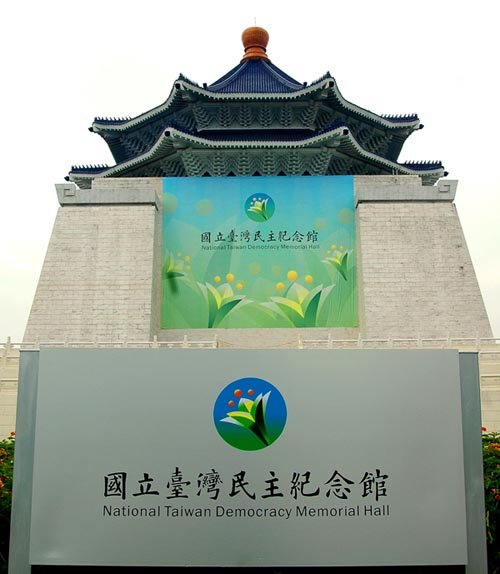
Side view shortly after the renaming ceremony in May 2007. The images evoke the Wild Lily student movement of 1990.

The renaming of the Chiang Kai-shek Memorial Hall in Taipei, Taiwan to National Taiwan Democracy Memorial Hall (Chinese: 國立台灣民主紀念館; pinyin: Guólì Táiwān Mínzhǔ Jìniànguǎn) was announced by President Chen Shui-bian on 15 May 2007. The surrounding plaza was rededicated to democracy as Liberty Square. This move was condemned by the pan-blue media as a political move by the Democratic Progressive Party to denounce the historical heritage of the Republic of China. The site was renamed back to the original title of the "Chiang Kai-shek Memorial Hall" on 20 July 2009 when the Kuomintang came back in power.

Chen was then a member of the Democratic Progressive Party (DPP). In 2007 his party and its allies controlled the executive branch of the ROC government. The opposition, the Kuomintang (KMT) and its allies held a one-vote majority in the legislature. With a national election looming in 2008, support and opposition divided along partisan lines. Legal wrangling ensued, with the debate centering on the prerogatives and powers of each branch of the ROC government. Legally, the executive branch held the authority to rename the monument and square without ratification by the legislature. The legislature, however, could deny some funding if it declined to recognize the new names in appropriate documents. The Taipei City Government, then under KMT control, also weighed in, arguing historical status for the relatively new site and invoking city ordinances forbidding the alteration of such sites. For the remainder of Chen's term both old and new names remained in use, with preferences lining up largely on partisan lines.

On 20 May 2008, Ma Ying-jeou arose as the victor in 2008 presidential elections, which also saw his KMT increase its majority in the legislature. During the campaign, Ma had promised to restore the original names and inscriptions at the site. After his election, Ma promised to undertake wide consultation before making a final decision about names. In August 2008, the Ministry of Education (MOE) officials announced that the administration recognized the original name of the memorial as the official one but that no final decision would be made on the matter until the public was consulted. In January 2009, the MOE announced that no public forums would take place, that the original plaque designating the hall as Chiang Kai-shek Memorial would be restored by the end of the summer, and that Liberty Square would be allowed to stand as the name of the plaza.

== Background ==
The society of Taiwan and other areas controlled by the ROC underwent a dramatic transformation in the years following the death of Chiang Kai-shek in 1975. In the next two decades, Chiang Ching-kuo and Lee Teng-hui presided over a peaceful transition from single-party rule enforcing martial law to pluralistic democracy with protected human rights. The nature and meaning of Chiang Kai-shek's rule could be openly debated and, as details of the February 28 Incident and White Terror publicly emerged, they were.

In 2000, Chen Shui-bian of the DPP was elected president. The executive branch of the ROC government fell out of KMT control for the first time. Executive power had been handed to the DPP and its affiliated parties, known as the Pan-Green Coalition; the KMT and its affiliated parties, known as the Pan-Blue Coalition, maintained control of the legislature. Elections in 2004 preserved the situation, awarding a second term to Chen and a majority in the legislature to the opposition.

== Proposal ==
In 2006, 37 DPP legislators proposed that Chiang Kai-shek's memorial be relocated to his tomb at Cihu and that the current structure be renamed Taiwan Democracy Memorial Hall (Chinese: 台灣民主紀念館). They noted that the law authorizing a memorial for Chiang does not specify the site; a change in locale could thus be enacted by a simple executive order.

The proposal attracted support from other Pan-Green officials. Pan-Green leaders saw the idea as another step in the direction of rectifying names and symbols associated with the authoritarian past of the ROC government to make them more inclusive and characteristic of local Taiwanese culture. Pan-Blue officials resisted the measure. Few expressed open support of Chiang Kai-shek or one-party rule, arguing instead that the move represented unnecessary expense and election-year theater and that the localization of Taiwan's place names and symbols represented a treacherous effort to desinicize the culture of the lands controlled by the ROC.

== Renaming process ==
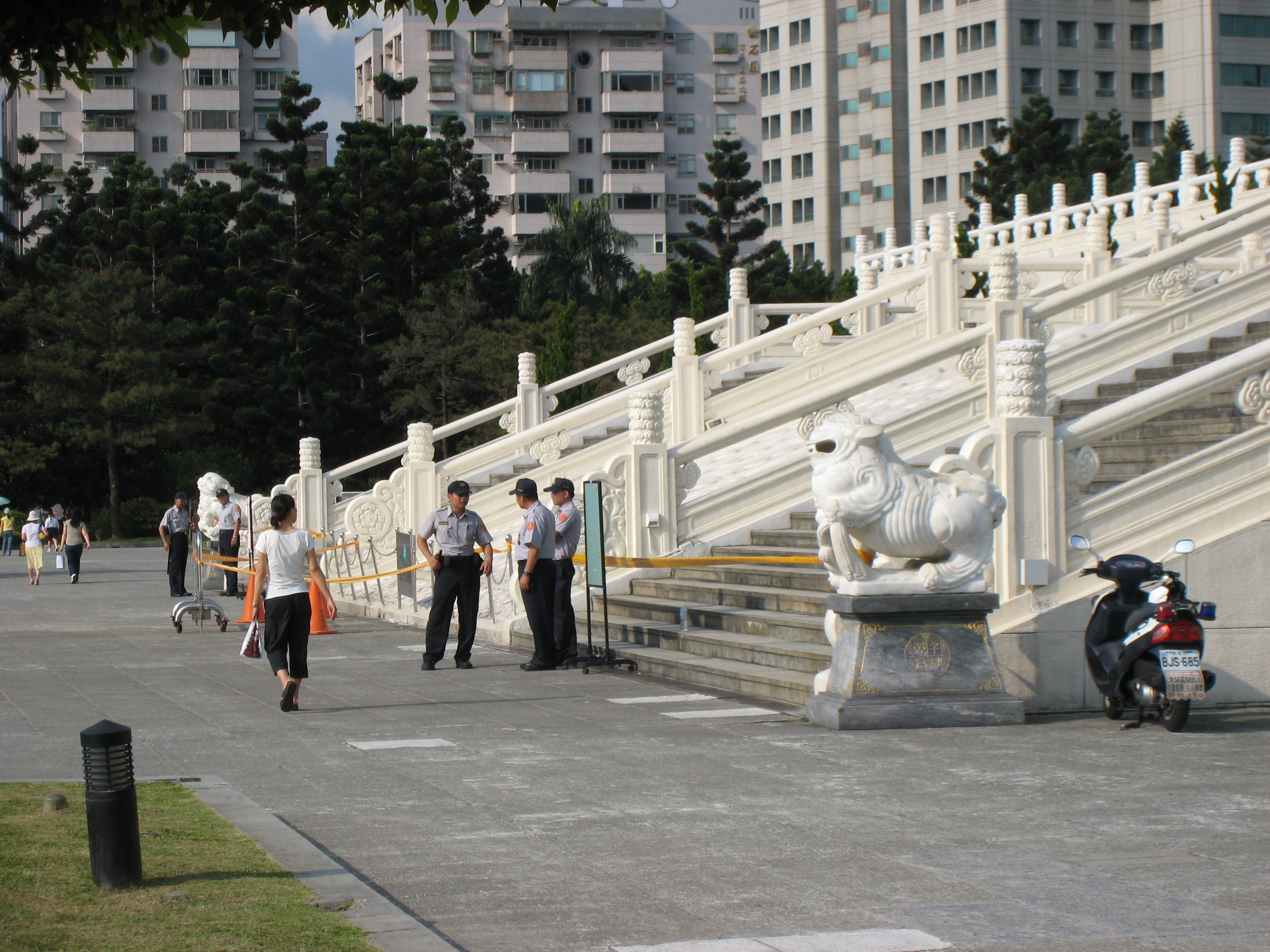
Police guarded the hall during the initial stages of the renaming controversy as the main chamber was closed to the public.

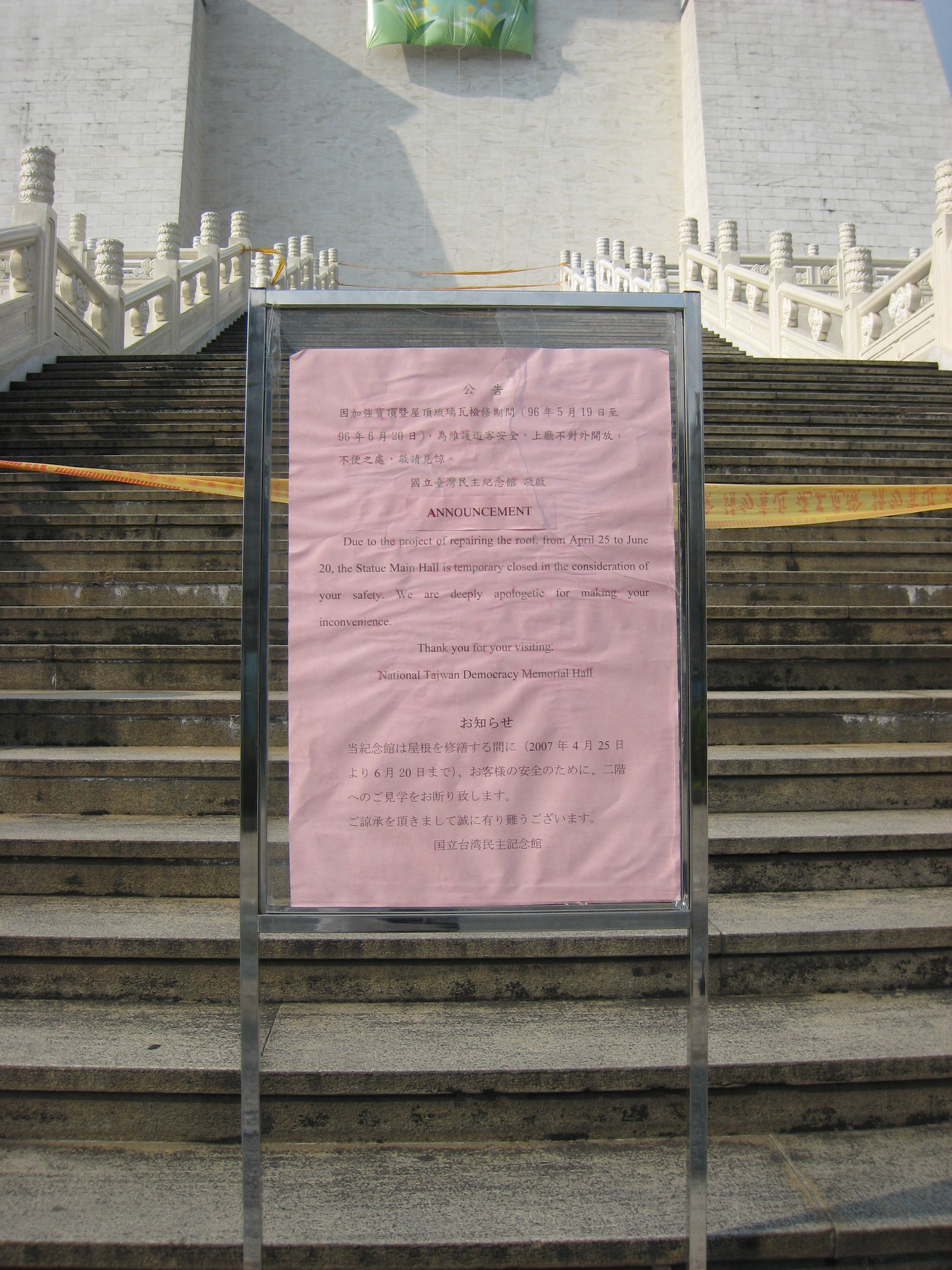
During the controversy the statue chamber was closed.

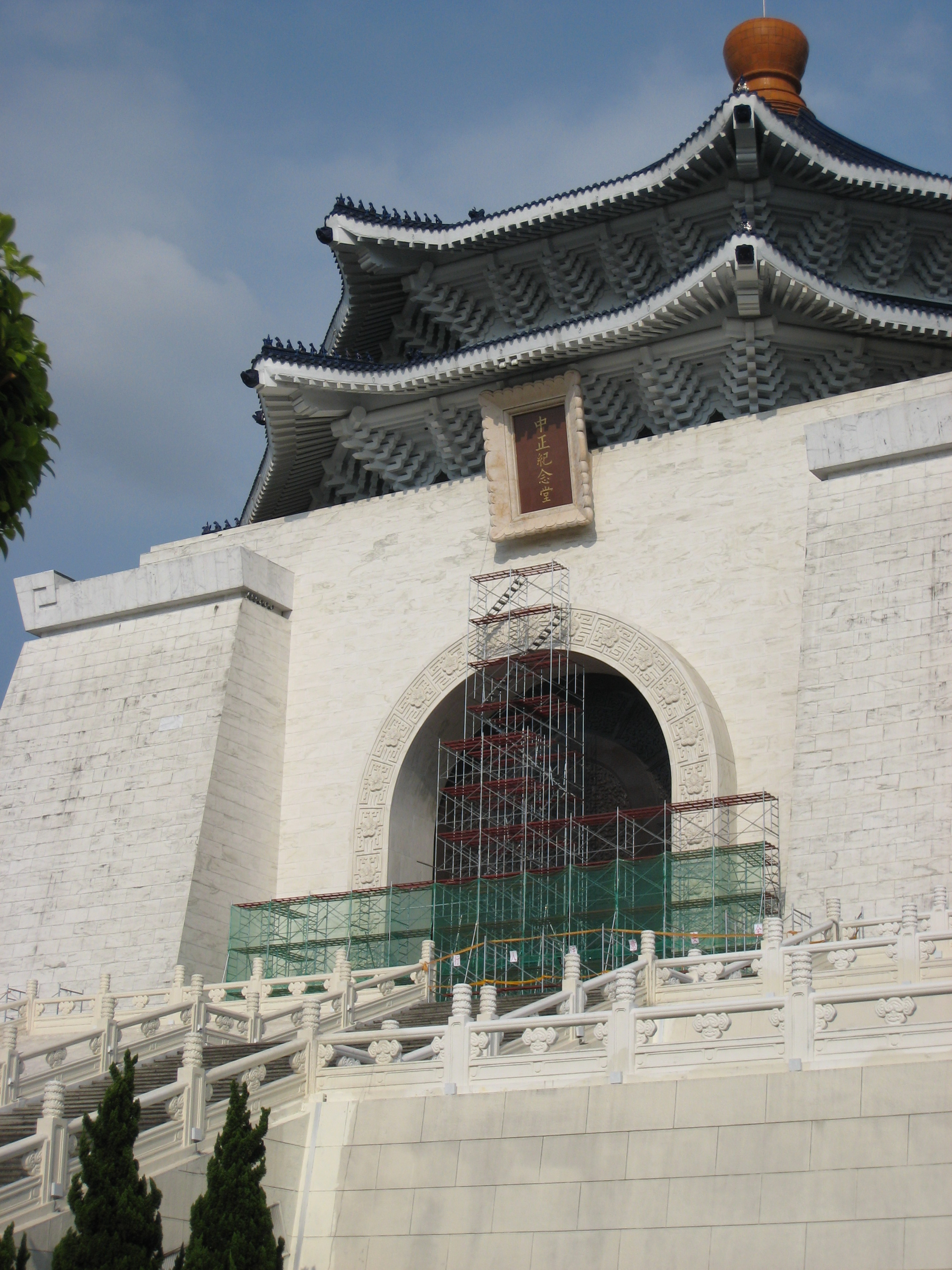
Scaffolding placed by the central government to cover the Chiang Kai-shek Memorial Hall inscription was partially dismantled by the Taipei city government.

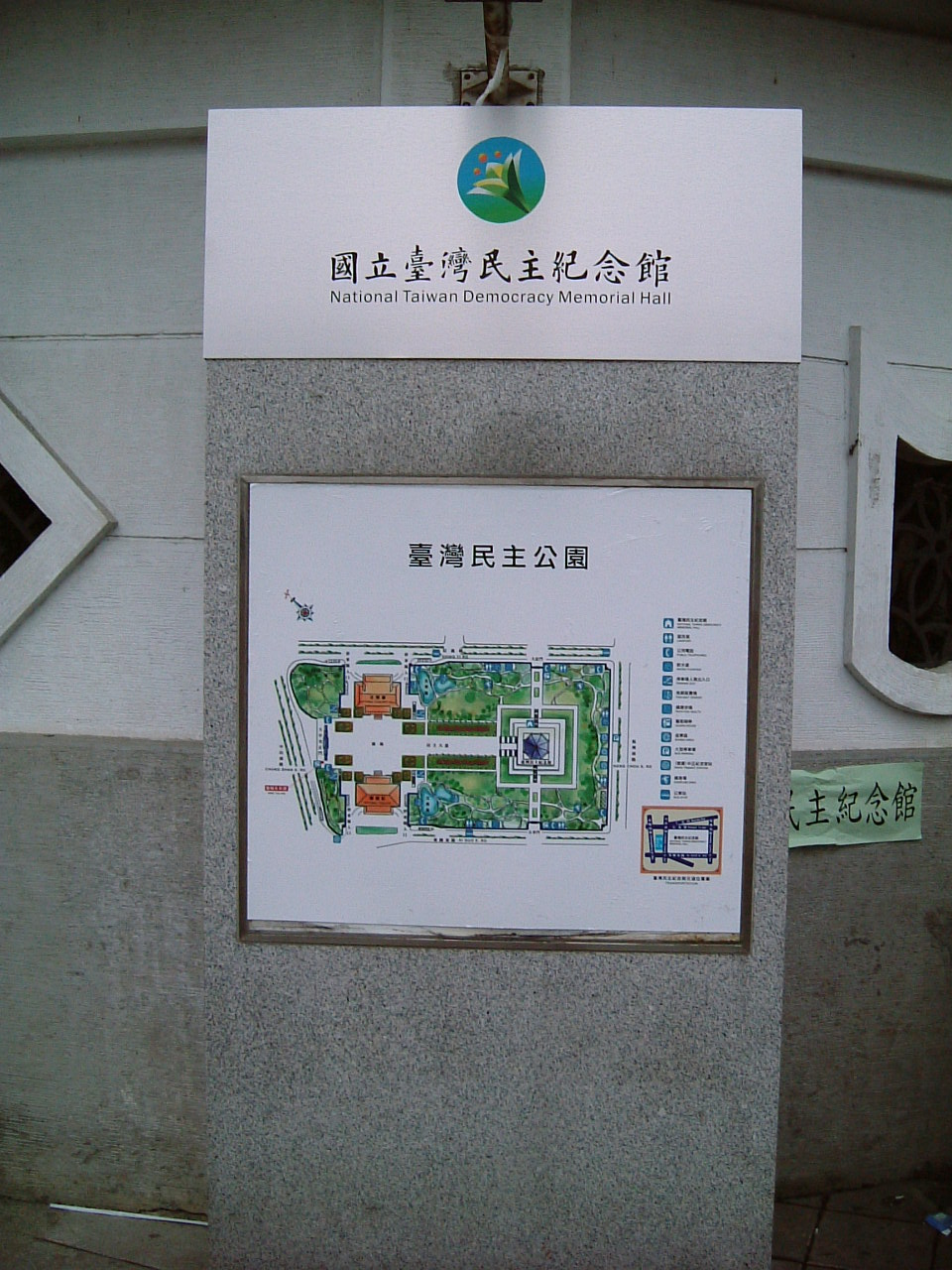
Sample of the new guides that can be found at the Hall

In 2007, the MOE of the Executive Yuan (part of the executive branch of government led by the DPP) decided to rename the hall. Support and resistance to the measure, mainly along party lines, materialized immediately. The Memorial had been listed as a "third tier" landmark on the government's list of protected heritage sites. The Executive Yuan subsequently demoted the Memorial Hall to a "fourth tier" landmark, in order to make changes to the hall without Legislative approval. The Executive Yuan said the name change complied with laws stating that fourth-tier landmarks may be modified by the Executive Yuan directly via Organic Regulations, rather than via Organic Acts that require legislative approval. KMT-led Taipei City government responded by designating the 27-year-old hall and its surrounding walls a "temporary historical site" to make alterations to the structure unlawful according to city ordinances.

The official ceremony marking the renaming of the hall took place on 19 May 2007 when President Chen unveiled a plaque in front of the memorial bearing the name National Taiwan Democracy Memorial Hall (Chinese: 國立台灣民主紀念館). Chen announced that the name change reflected the desire of citizens "to bid goodbye to the old age and to show that we Taiwanese are all standing firmly behind the universal values of freedom, democracy and human rights." He noted that the date, May 19, marked the fifty-eighth anniversary of the imposition of martial law on Taiwan; the event began rule by the military on the island for thirty-eight years. Minor scuffles broke out among gathered spectators before the ceremony.

Large banners covering the north and south faces of the hall displayed the new name along with images of Formosan lilies. Their design recalled the pro-democracy Wild Lily student movement of 1990. New signs, displaying the new name and graphics, appeared in the garden park areas of the north and south gates. A drape covered the original name plaque over the entrance and the doors remained closed. No physical changes to the structure of the hall, though, were apparent and the statue of Chiang Kai-shek remained intact inside.

On May 22, Taipei City authorities moved in and dismantled the scaffolding obscuring the "Chiang Kai-shek Memorial Hall" tablet, and also removed the gigantic signs bearing the text "Taiwan Democracy Memorial Hall" which had been hung over the memorial hall, on the basis that this covered the cultural site, which violates the Cultural Protection Law of the ROC and also that it was unauthorised advertising which violated Taipei City law. The city government also issued a fine to the MOE for the second time over its redesignation moves, for blocking the view of and access to a heritage building. The MOE had earlier shut the gates to the memorial for what it claimed was "repair work". The city government has stated that, since no workmen could be observed conducting any repair work, it will take steps to reopen the gates.

On May 24, the new name plate unveiled by Chen Shui-bian was taken down by the MOE. The ministry cited the costly efforts to have a constant police guard at the name plate as the primary reason for its removal. A veteran was seen spitting on the new name plate that prompted the 24-hour police presence.

On June 7, a joint meeting of committees in the Legislative Yuan repealed the MOE's Organic Regulations of the National Taiwan Democracy Hall that established the name change. The move effectively voided the legal basis for the change, though Pan Blue legislators refrained from declaring the new name dead or the old one preserved. One legislator involved in the repeal was quoted as saying the final designation for the hall remained a political issue to be resolved through political means. Wang Shu-hui, DPP deputy caucus whip, argued that the legislature had "infringed upon the power of the central government by abolishing measures governing organizations under its jurisdiction".

On November 6, the Council of Cultural Affairs (CCA) officially designated the memorial hall and its surrounding park a national historic site, which puts control over alterations to the site in the hands of the central government's heritage bodies.

The memorial hall website remains at cksmh.gov.tw, from the abbreviation of "Chiang Kai-Shek Memorial Hall", but it refers to the hall at the time as the Taiwan Democracy Memorial Hall. Subsidiary bodies, such as the Chiang Kai-Shek Memorial Hall Digital Library, did not all change their names to reflect this.

In December 2008, crowds gathered to watch the inscription at the main gate changed to designate the plaza as Liberty Square.

=== Legal controversy ===
The legality of the Executive Yuan's move has been disputed by the Pan-Blue Coalition. Legislator Chang Hsien-yao said, "According to the Constitution, any administrative order that goes against an existing law is invalid. So if the Legislature has not yet abolished the organic act of the CKS Memorial Hall, which has the same legal status as law, the newly proposed organic regulation, which is an administrative order, is invalid." The Constitution of the Republic of China gives only the Legislature the power to enact, amend, or repeal laws. KMT legislators contend that the move by the Executive Yuan encroaches upon the powers of the Legislative Yuan, thereby violating the separation of powers.

Taipei City Mayor Hau Lung-pin declared he would authorize no changes to city-maintained signs, including mass transit signs and maps, to recognize changes of names at the site. Hau cited the high costs of making such changes and blamed the name change on the desire of officials to create "ideological strife." The mayor said he recognized no name changes at the site to be legal unless recognized by the national legislature.

Debate over the name also took place on literary grounds. The term "Memorial Hall" (紀念堂) is normally used in Chinese to commemorate a deceased person or past event, such as the Chiang Kai-shek Memorial Hall, the Chairman Mao Memorial Hall in Beijing or the numerous Sun Yat-sen Memorial Halls in Taiwan and Mainland China. Supporters of the name change had in mind the work of activists for democracy in Taiwan's history, especially those who had died for their efforts. Critics argued that the name "Taiwan Democracy Memorial Hall" implied that Taiwan's democracy was dead.

=== Re-opening ===
On 4 December 2007, the CCA passed a regulation giving the central government exclusive jurisdiction over modification to the memorial hall. Once the regulation was formally announced by the cabinet, the MOE was authorized to change to the inscription on the front gate of the square from "Great Centrality and Perfect Uprightness" ("大中至正") to "Liberty Square" ("自由廣場"). The new inscription placed the characters in left-to-right sequence, a modern practice that had recently become official in Taiwan, rather than the right-to-left sequence of ancient Chinese tradition. In reaction to the passing of the regulation, KMT-led Taipei City Government officials said they would continue to fight for jurisdiction over the hall. The new inscriptions to be used on the main building and the main gate are made up of Chinese characters from the works of famous ancient Chinese calligraphers. The inscription over the main building spells "Taiwan Democracy Memorial Hall" (台灣民主紀念館) in seven characters taken from the calligraphy works of Ouyang Xun of the Tang dynasty, while the four Chinese characters that represent "Liberty Square" (自由廣場) on the main gate is from the work of calligrapher Wang Xizhi of the East Jin dynasty.

On December 6, the memorial hall was closed to the public at 9:00 a.m. for three days by order of the MOE to facilitate the replacement of the inscription on the main gate. Some relatives of victims of the February 28 Incident held a vigil at the memorial hall supporting the ministry's decision while other groups of people protested the replacement of the inscription; the city government laid roadblocks to prevent cranes from approaching. KMT presidential candidate Ma Ying-jeou said at a separate setting that he would undo any removal or name change to the hall if he was elected.

On December 7, the old inscriptions on the main gate were removed. Contracted workers took more than seven hours to separate the four characters, each weighing half a ton, and lower them down carefully one by one. The final character, zheng (正), was peeled off at 5:26 p.m. A TV cameraman was run over by a small truck and seriously injured as supporters and opponents of the government's decision to alter the plaque at the memorial hall clashed near the scene. The Taipei City Government issued another NT$1 million fine to the MOE for damaging a historical site. The MOE defended its move and denied any other plans to modify the site, such as removing the statue of Chiang Kai-shek or demolishing the walls surrounding the park.

On December 8, the four new characters, which match the size of those taken down, were placed on the lawn in the afternoon by the side of the gate in advance of their installation. Also on that afternoon, the last bolt was hammered to complete the installation of the new "Liberty Square" inscription on the front side of the arch. At the same time, the new plaque for the main hall, bearing the name "National Taiwan Democracy Hall", was shown publicly for the first time. The plaque over the hall itself would be separated into 15 smaller pieces and removed. The official reopening of the site was scheduled for December 9. However, the slow pace of work postponed the reopening until the next day. The delay was caused by the requirement to carefully align each character, with ground crews having to stand approximately 100 meters away and guide the team on the crane who were affixing the characters. On December 6, city government's Labor Standard Inspection Office had issued an order to halt all work on the gate inscriptions, citing unsafe scaffolding.

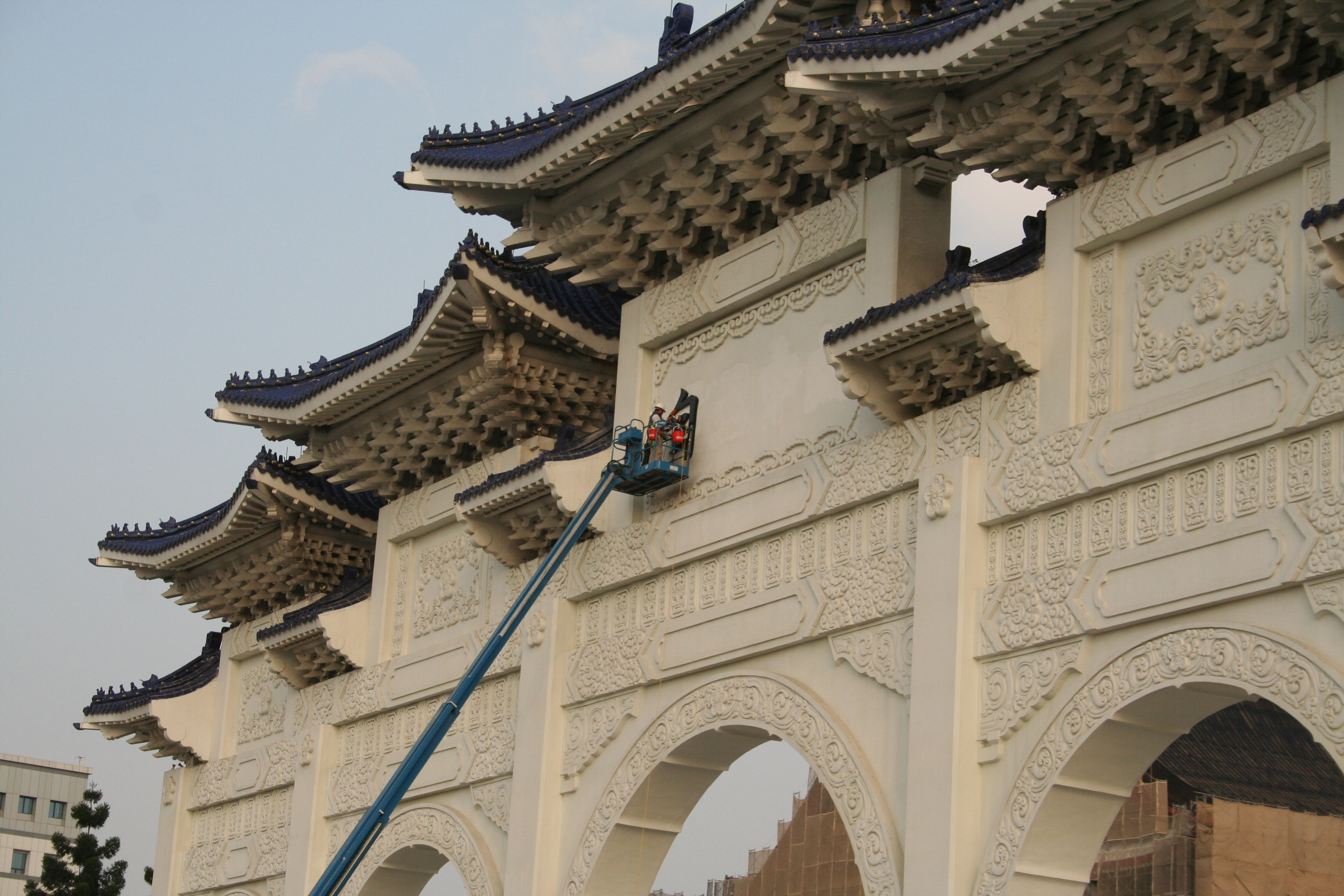
The first character of the new inscription is installed on 8 December 2007.

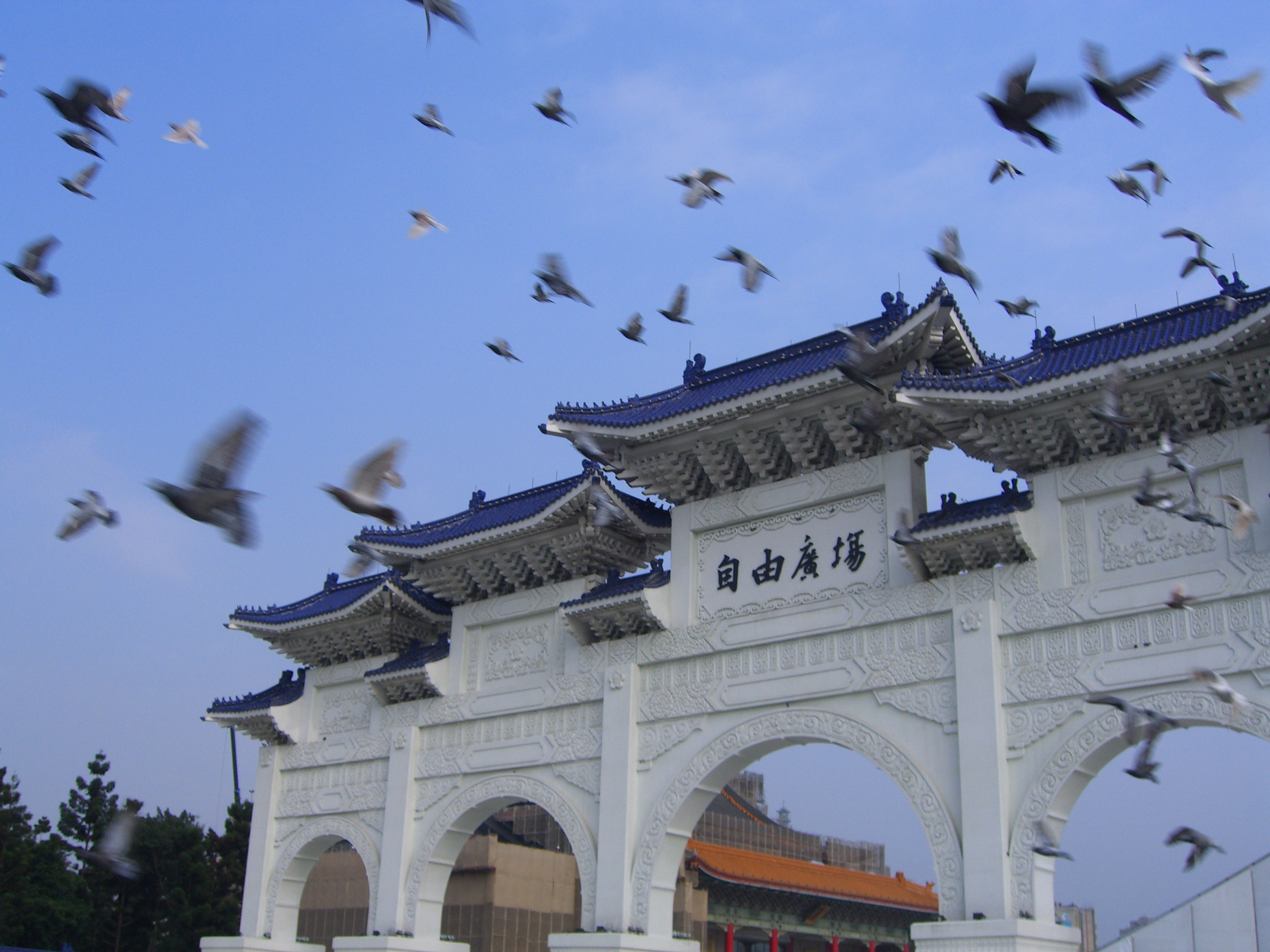
The new inscription

On December 30, Vice President Annette Lu apologized to the public for the MOE's mishandling of the controversial plaque removal at the memorial hall, which she referred to as the "Chiang Kai-shek Memorial Hall" despite the MOE's purported renaming. She blamed her party's underperformance in opinion polls ahead of the 2008 presidential election on Education Minister Tu Cheng-sheng's mishandling of the issue.

On New Year's Day 2008, the memorial hall opened a new exhibition on Taiwan's democratizing process sponsored by the "2.28 Memorial Fund". President Chen said the re-dedicated monument symbolized "opening the door to democracy". While the 10m-high (33 ft) bronze statue of Chiang remains in place, the guard of honor has been removed. As part of the exhibition, records of victims and milestones on the road to democracy were placed around the statue, along with about 300 kites to represent winds of democratic change.

== Restoration ==
KMT candidate Ma Ying-jeou was elected the 12th President of the Republic of China on 22 March 2008. Ma had earlier pledged to restore the name of CKS Memorial Hall, the original hall contents (flags and guards), and the inscription on both the central gate and door. President Ma took office on May 20.

The MOE ended the special exhibition on 31 March 2008. The kites will be sent on a touring exhibition overseas. Other exhibits would be placed in storage and the hall returned to its state prior to the shut-down. The MOE announcements tended to be low key.

In an interview after his election, Ma said that the "illegal" renaming was "violent" and "of course, ineffective". He promised to conduct wide public consultation regarding the names of the square and the memorial before acting according to law to either restore the old name or complete any renaming processes.

The Executive Yuan on 21 August 2008, under Ma's administration, officially restored the name "National Chiang Kai-Shek Memorial Hall" to the hall. The sign designating the hall a monument to democracy remained in place.

On 21 January 2009 Vice Minister of Education Lu Mu-lin (呂木琳) announced that the original plaque designating the hall as Chiang Kai-shek Memorial would be restored by the end of the summer at a cost of NT$1 million (US$29,700). The guard ceremonies in the statue chamber would also be restored. He admitted that the promised forum soliciting public opinion would not take place, saying such an event would only "increase tensions" and invoke backlash from the Taiwanese minority who align themselves with the DPP. Lu announced at the same time that Liberty Square would stand as the name for the plaza. "No changes will be made to it," he said, "as the square plays an important role in Taiwan’s democratic and cultural development." On 20 July 2009 the original plaque was restored under heavy police protection, but virtually non-existent media coverage before the event, since the attention was on the World Games 2009 taking place in the same time in Kaohsiung City.

== See also ==
- Taiwanization
