= Wild Strawberries Movement =

Protest movement in Taiwan

- Traditional Chinese: 野草莓運動
- Simplified Chinese: 野草莓运动
- Literal meaning: Wild Strawberries Movement
Transcriptions
Standard Mandarin
- Hanyu Pinyin: Yě Cǎoméi Yùndòng
Southern Min
- Hokkien POJ: Iá Chháu-m̂ Ūn-tōng
- Tâi-lô: Iá Tsháu-m̂ Ūn-tōng

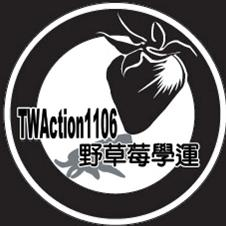
The official logo for the Wild Strawberry movement, including the Chinese name as well as "TWAction1106"

The Wild Strawberries Movement (Chinese: 野草莓運動) is a protest movement in Taiwan begun on 6 November 2008 after the visit of the People's Republic of China's ARATS chairman Chen Yunlin to the island. Police actions on protests aimed at Chen suppressed the display of Republic of China national flag and the playing of Taiwanese songs. This prompted a group of 400 students in Taipei, Taiwan to begin a sit-in in front of the Executive Yuan in protest of Taiwan's Parade and Assembly Act.

== Background ==
The name chosen by the students for their initiative, "Wild Strawberry", makes a pair of references. The word wild recalls the Wild Lily student movement of 1990, which led to vast political reforms and Taiwan's first general democratic elections. The word strawberry makes ironic use of the term "strawberry generation", a description of Taiwan's youth employed pejoratively by their elders to portray the newest generation as "soft", lacking strength of character and political convictions.

== Demonstrations ==
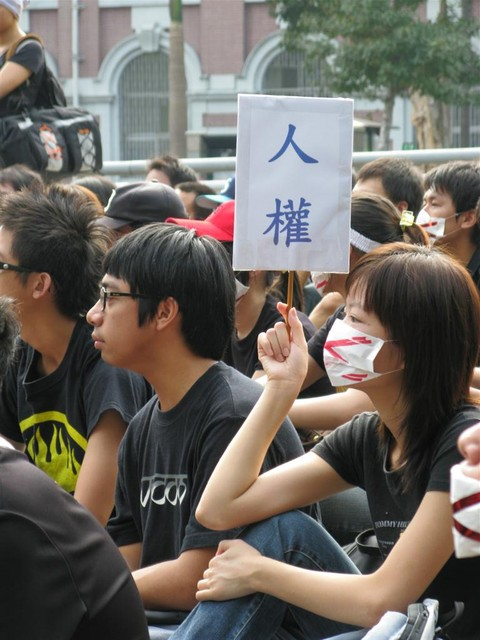
Protesters stage a sit-in; a female protester is holding a sign reading "human rights" (Chinese: 人權).

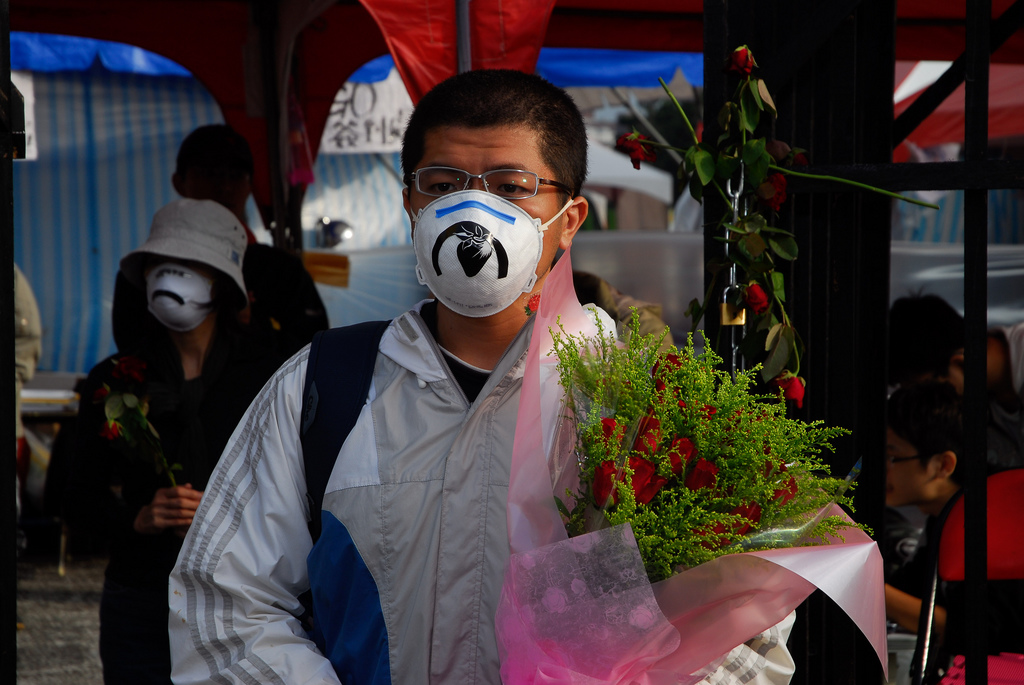
Protesting student

Sit-ins began with students in Taipei in front of the Executive Yuan. On November 7, 2008, police began removing protesters from the scene and taking them to separate locations around the city. Having made a regrouping plan earlier, the students reconvened at Liberty Square in front of the Chiang Kai-shek Memorial Hall.

Following the lead of the students in Taipei, six other sit-in protests sprang up around Taiwan:

- Kaohsiung, November 7
- Tainan, November 7
- Taichung, November 9
- Changhua, November 9
- Hsinchu, November 10
- Chiayi, November 12

== Student demands and government responses ==
The student-led sit-in protests were conducted in response to incidents of police violence and abuse of power during the visit of Chen Yunlin to Taiwan. The original protesters in Taipei issued a statement with the following demands:

1. A public apology by President Ma Ying-jeou and Premier Liu Chao-shiuan for police misconduct.
2. The immediate resignations of National Police Agency Director-General Wang Cho-chiun and National Security Bureau Director-General (Tsai Chao-ming).
3. An immediate review and amendment of the Assembly and Parade Law to ensure the right of peaceful assembly and expression.

Government responses to the Wild Strawberry petition included these actions:

- On November 11, 2008, Premier Liu made a statement to the Liberty Times as saying, "I will not apologize. With this kind of thing, you just wait one or two days and it will pass."
- President Ma Ying-jeou addressed the students on November 13, 2008, saying that, while he believed there was room for improvement in Wang Cho-chiun and Tsai Chao-ming's handling of public assembly issues, he saw no reason for them to step down.
- On December 11, 2008, Wild Strawberry and Tibetan demonstrators at Liberty Square were forced by police to leave the site for failure to comply with the existing Assembly and Parade Law.
- On December 24, 2008, an amended version of the Assembly and Parade Act passed its initial review at the legislature's Internal Administration Committee.

The amended version of the law remained controversial at the time of drafting in May 2009. Proposed changes fell short of student demands for a law in Taiwan that resembles assembly laws in European Union nations and the United States that give priority to constitutional guarantees of rights to peaceful assembly and free speech. While the proposed amendments would make the new law generally more permissive than one crafted during the martial law period, proposals continued to give state police substantial powers of veto over the content and location of citizen rallies.

== WildBerry House ==
On January 4, 2009, the movement stopped sit-ins. A headquarters called "WildBerry House" (野苺之家) was established in Taipei for the movement. This location subsequently closed as of June 30, 2009.

== See also ==
- Sunflower Student Movement
- Wild Lily student movement
- Taiwanization
- Dang Guo
- Human rights in Taiwan
- Blue Sky with White Sun
