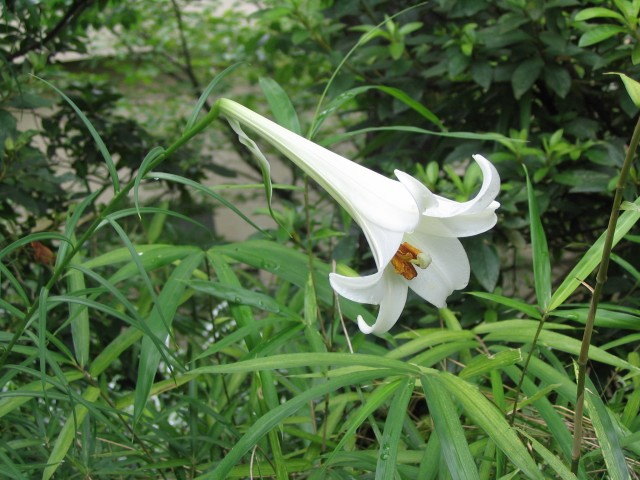

Scientific classification
- Kingdom: Plantae
- Clade: Tracheophytes
- Clade: Angiosperms
- Clade: Monocots
- Order: Liliales
- Family: Liliaceae
- Subfamily: Lilioideae
- Tribe: Lilieae
- Genus: Lilium
- Species: L. formosanum

Binomial name
- Lilium formosanum Wallace

Synonyms
- Synonymy: Lilium longiflorum var. formosanum Baker; Lilium philippinense var. formosanum Grove; Lilium formosanum var. pricei Stoker; Lilium zairei Mynett & Mackiewicz

= Lilium formosanum =

Species of lily

Lilium formosanum, also known as the Formosa lily or Taiwanese lily (traditional Chinese: 台灣百合; simplified Chinese: 台湾百合; pinyin: Táiwān bǎihé), is a plant species in the lily family, endemic to Taiwan. It is closely related to the Easter lily found in the Ryukyu Islands of Japan, eastern and northern Taiwan. Both species are cultivated for their showy, trumpet-shaped flowers. Lilium formosanum has become naturalized in scattered locations in Africa, Australia, and the Americas.

== Description ==
Lilium formosanum reaches a height of 120 to 150 cm. The bulbs are small, rounded and reach a diameter of around 2 to 4 cm. They consist of white to yellowish lanceolate scales. The stem is smooth to papillose and sometimes tinged with purple. The leaves are linear or narrow and lanceolate, 2.5 to 15 cm long and 4 to 13 mm wide. They are freely distributed around the stem.

The plant blooms from June to December with one to five fragrant, funnel-shaped flowers in an umbel. The hermaphrodite flowers are threefold. The six identically shaped flower bracts are broadly spatulate and 11.5 to 14.5 cm long. The basic color of the flowers is pure white, the outside is purple. Each flower contains three carpels and six stamens. The anthers are about 10 mm long, the pollen is yellow, the filaments are very long, about 10 cm. The nectaries are green and papillose on both sides. The seeds ripen in slender 7 cm to 9 cm long seed capsules and germinate immediately above the soil surface.

== Names ==
Several common names for the Taiwanese lily are in use among Taiwanese-speaking peoples. These include wild lily (野百合 or 高砂百合), trumpet flower (喇叭花), mountain garlic (山蒜頭, 山石蒜, or 山蒜瓣), and master's flask (師公鈃 or 師公鈃仔花). It is said the flower has another name of flower of broken bowl (打碗花) from the elderly members of the Hakka ethnic group. They believe that because the Taiwanese lily grows near bodies of clean water, harming the lily may damage the environment, just like breaking the bowls that people rely on. An alternative explanation is that parents convince children into not taking the lily by convincing the children that their dinner bowls may break if they destroy this flower.

=== Varieties ===
- Lilium formosanum var. formosanum
- Lilium formosanum var. microphyllum T.S.Liu & S.S.Ying

== In indigenous culture ==
This flower is favoured among the Rukai people who call this flower bariangalay, the Rukai often wear them in headdresses during special occasions or ceremonies.

== See also ==
- Wild Lily student movement
