= Liberty Square (Taipei) =

Public plaza in Taipei, Taiwan

- Town square
- Freedom Square
- Former name: Chiang Kai-shek Memorial Square
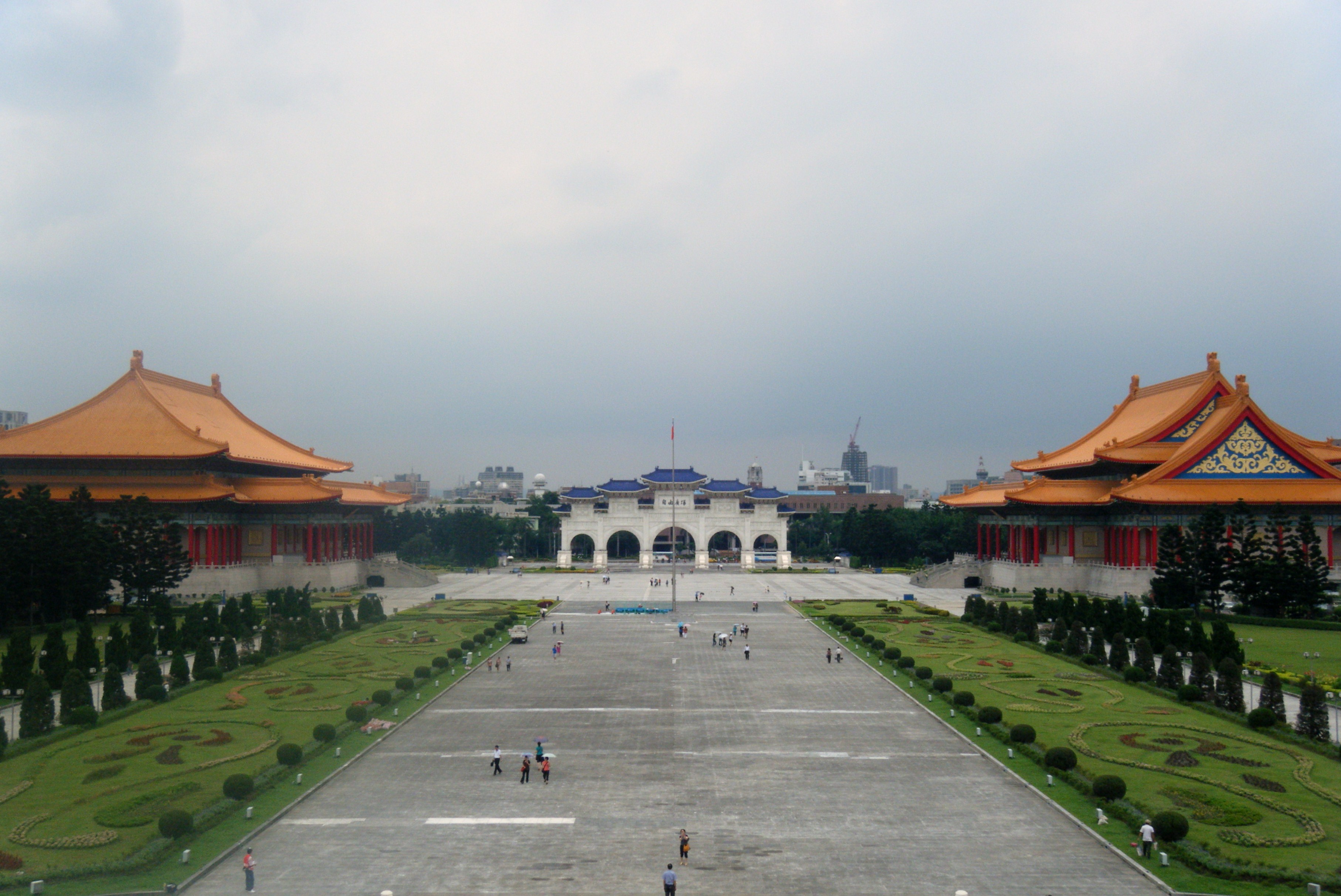
- Liberty Square
- Features: National Chiang Kai-shek Memorial Hall; National Concert Hall; National Theater
- Design: Yang Cho-cheng
- Opened: 1970s
- Area: 240,000 square metres (2,600,000 sq ft)
- Dedicated to: Chiang Kai-shek
- Location: Zhongzheng District, Taipei, Taiwan
- Location within Taiwan
- Coordinates: 25°2′4″N 121°31′18″E

Liberty Square
- Traditional Chinese: 自由廣場
- Simplified Chinese: 自由广场
Transcriptions
Standard Mandarin
- Hanyu Pinyin: Zìyóu Guǎngchǎng
Southern Min
- Hokkien POJ: Chū-iû Kóng-tiûⁿ

Liberty Square (also Freedom Square) is a public plaza covering over 240,000 square metres (2,600,000 sq ft) in the Zhongzheng District of Taipei, Taiwan. It has served as the city's public gathering place of choice since its completion in the late 1970s. The name of the square recalls the important historical role it played in Taiwan's transition from one-party rule to modern democracy in the 1990s.

== Overview ==
Liberty Square serves as a major site for public gatherings in Taipei and is home to three major landmarks as well as civic parks. At the east end of Liberty Square stands the National Chiang Kai-shek Memorial Hall. The square is flanked by the National Concert Hall on the north and the National Theater on the south. A park surrounds the plaza and a wall surrounds the site. The square sits within sight of the Presidential Office Building.

Liberty Square regularly serves as the site of mass gatherings in Taiwan. It is the scene for red-carpet ceremonies when Taiwan's president greets foreign dignitaries. Crowds gather at the square throughout the year for outdoor festivals and concerts. The Taipei Lantern Festival regularly takes place on the square. On many days students, athletes and soldiers may be seen at the square, working on drills and dance routines. The National Theater and Concert Hall host over 800 events every year and provide iconic backdrops for events on the square.

The ponds and parks surrounding the memorial and cultural centers feature well-maintained lawns, trees, and pathways. The ponds are filled with colourful koi traditionally found in gardens in East Asia. The parks regularly play host to quieter forms of public activity, such as Go games and taekwondo, tai chi and other martial arts practices. Holiday marching band and drum and bugle corps concerts, honor guard drill shows and traditional Chinese dances are also held within the grounds.

== History ==
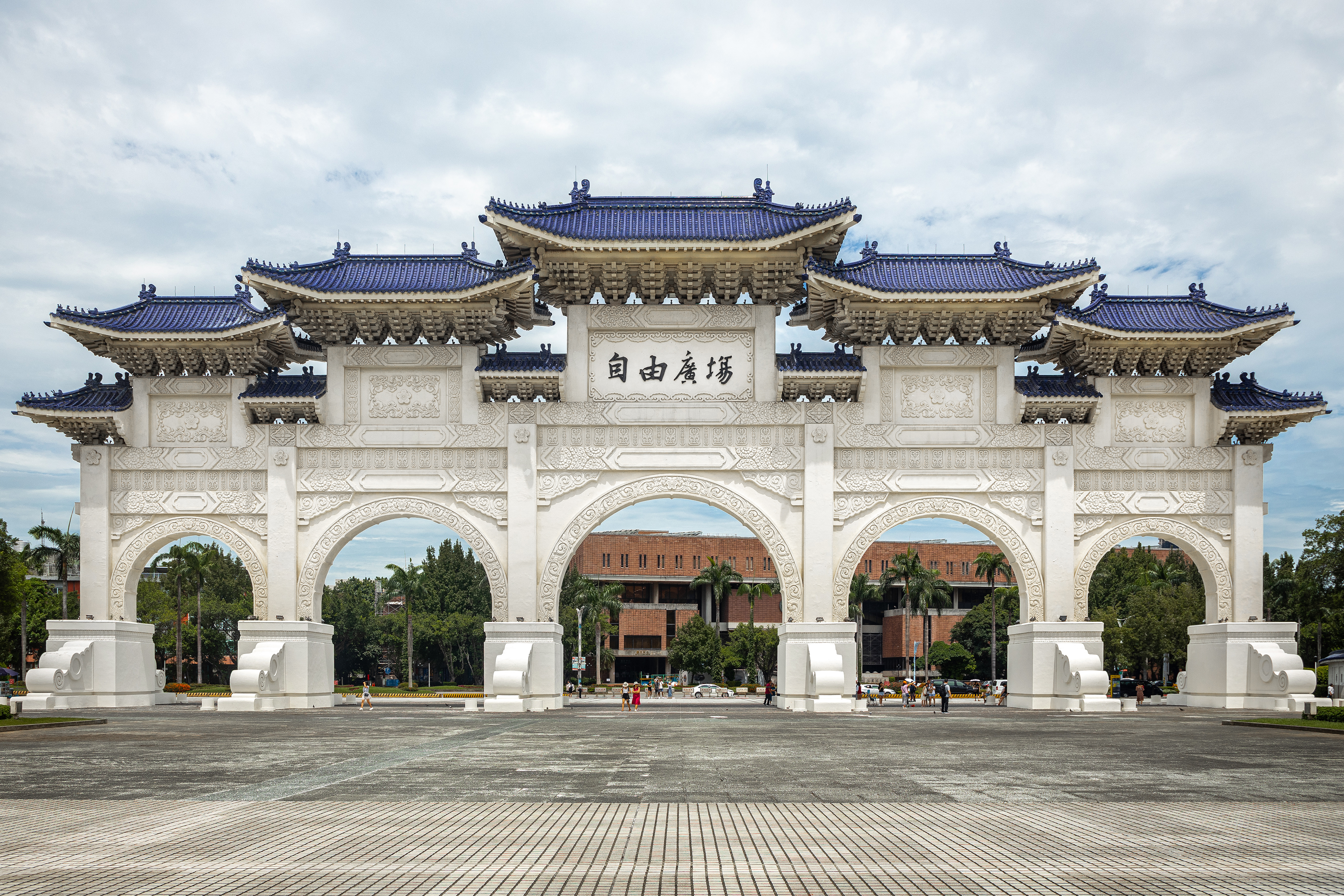
Liberty Square main gate (paifang) in 2023

The square had its beginnings in the 1970s at a time when Taiwan remained under martial one-party rule by the Kuomintang (Chinese Nationalists). Architect Yang Cho-cheng conceived the plaza as part of a grand design for a memorial to Chiang Kai-shek, the President of the Republic of China who relocated to Taiwan after the overthrow of the Kuomintang regime in China during the Chinese Civil War. The square first opened to the public as Chiang Kai-shek Memorial Square after Chiang's death in 1975.

Architecture at the site incorporates many traditional elements and recalls earlier Kuomintang monuments erected in Republican China. Yang's design symbolically assigned civic virtues to each area of the square. The main gate, the Gate of Integrity (大中至正; using the two characters of Chiang Kai-shek's name), was placed at the west end on Zhongshan South Road, with the Gate of Loyalty (大忠門) standing at the north side on Xinyi Road and the Gate of Piety (大孝門) at the south side on Aiguo East Road. A Boulevard of Homage, bordered by manicured bushes, connects the square to the memorial hall.

The square became Taipei's site of choice for mass gatherings as soon as it opened. The nature of many gatherings gave the site new historical meanings. The square became the hub of events in the 1980s and early 1990s that ushered Taiwan into its era of modern democracy. Of the many pro-democracy demonstrations that took place at the square, the most influential was the Wild Lily student movement of 1990. The movement provided the impetus for the far-reaching political reforms of President Lee Teng-hui. These culminated in the first popular elections of national leaders in 1996.

The plaza's importance in the development of Taiwan's democracy led to its rededication as Liberty Square by President Chen Shui-bian in 2007. Though the announcement of the new name was initially greeted with hostility by officials in the Pan-Blue camp, the name was eventually affirmed by officials across the political spectrum.

The inscriptions over the archways, including the main gate that declares the plaza as "Liberty Square", recall the calligraphic style of Wang Xizhi in the East Jin Dynasty (see Chinese calligraphy). The style is noted for its sense of vitality, movement and freedom. The characters are placed in left-to-right sequence, following modern practice in Taiwan, rather than the right-to-left order of ancient Chinese tradition, which had been adopted at the site previously.

Liberty Square remains popular as a public meeting place and a symbol of democratic progress. Within weeks of its re-dedication the square was the scene of demonstrations on behalf of freedom for Tibet, and within the year it was the scene of rallies for speech and assembly rights by the Wild Strawberry student movement. In February 2017 Taiwan's Ministry of Culture announced plans to transform the Chiang Kai-Shek Memorial Hall itself into a national center for “facing history, recognizing agony, and respecting human rights.”

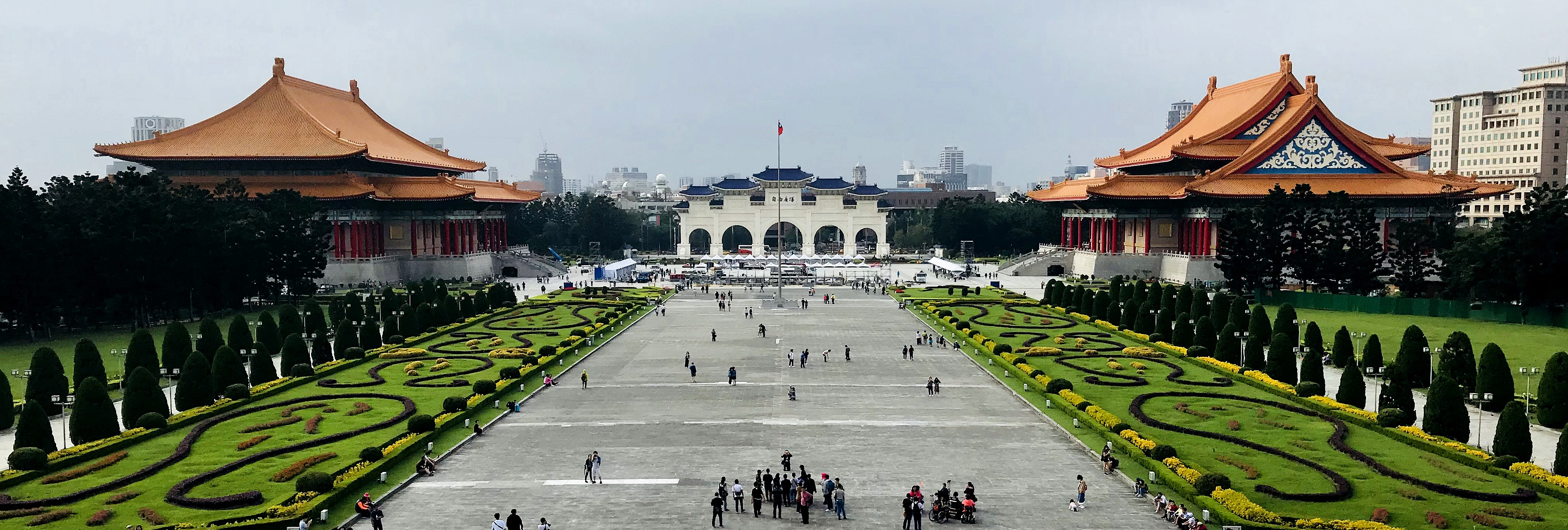
View of the square looking west

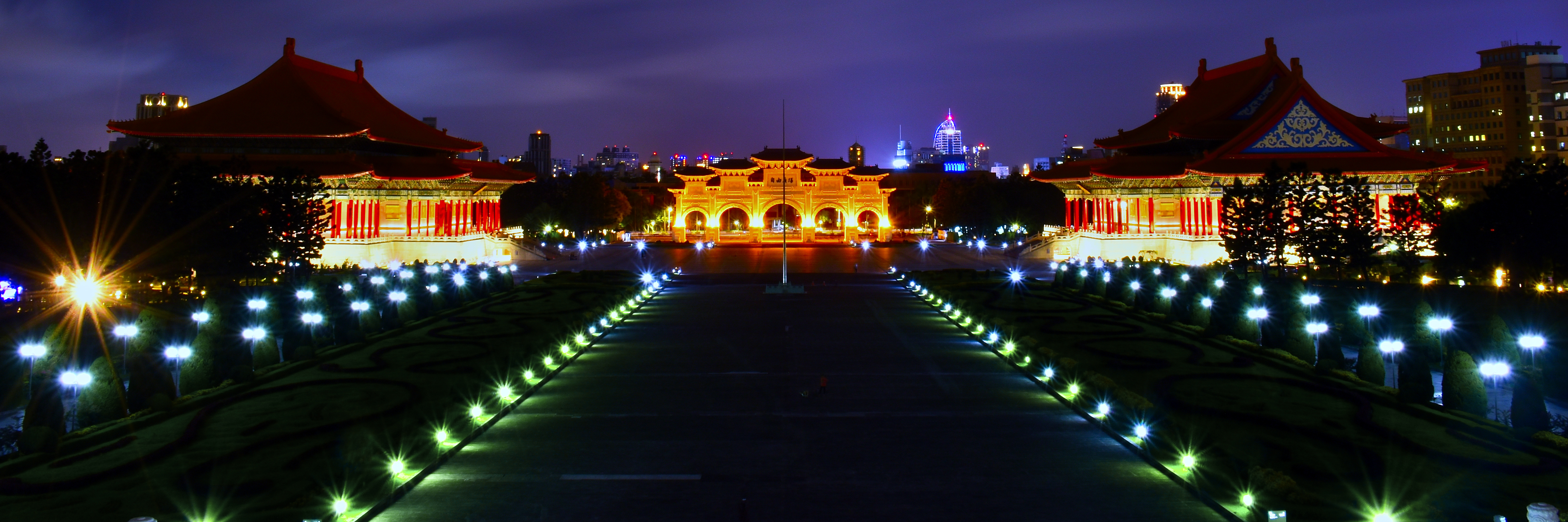
Liberty Square at night. Looking west.

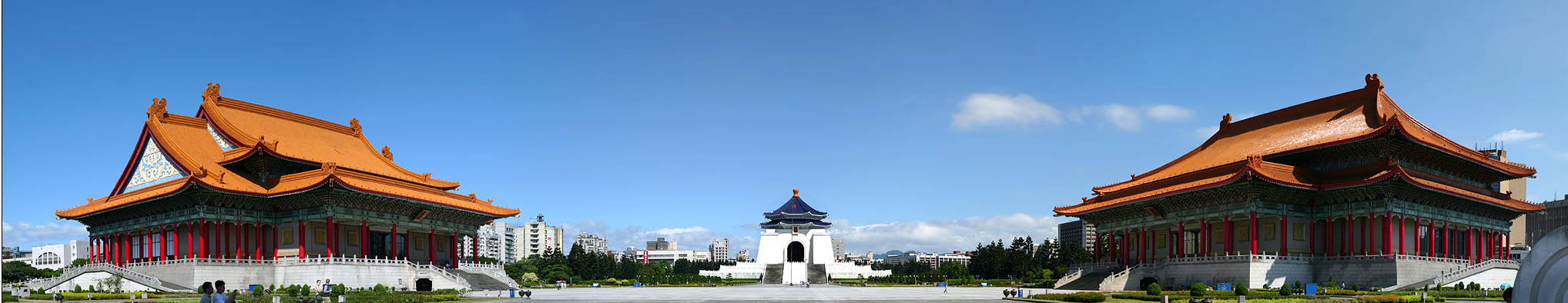
A panorama of the square looking east, with the National Concert Hall (left) and the National Theater (right)

== Transportation ==
The square is accessible from Chiang Kai-shek Memorial Hall Station of Taipei Metro.

== See also ==
- National Theater and Concert Hall
