= Yang Cho-cheng =

Taiwanese architect (1914–2006)

Yang Cho-cheng 楊卓成
- Born: 1914
- Died: 26 November 2006 (aged 91–92)
- Occupation: Architect
- Buildings: Chiang Kai-shek Memorial Hall

Yang Cho-cheng (Chinese: 楊卓成; pinyin: Yáng Zhuōchéng; 1914 – 26 November 2006) was an internationally renowned Chinese architect. One of his best-known works is the Chiang Kai-shek Memorial Hall, a major landmark in Taipei – with his design being chosen from entries in an international competition.

Many of his other works have become famous landmarks in Taiwan: the Taipei Grand Hotel, National Theater and Concert Hall, the Shilin Official Residence, Taipei Grand Mosque, Cihu Presidential Burial Place, Central Bank of the Republic of China (Taiwan) Building, and the Zhongxing New Village.

Yang's professional career spanned over 60 years. Even though he was best known for his expertise in the Chinese style architecture, he was also a leading expert in manufacturing, high tech, finance, performing arts, and commercial/residential architecture. He also designed the manufacturing facilities for RCA, Philips, Timex, Texas Instruments in Taiwan; as well as for pharmaceutical companies such as Eli Lilly and Company and Roche.

When he was close to 80 years old, he designed the semiconductor factory for TI-Acer. Although it is an older facility, the building remains notable as one of the few meeting the vibration free specifications and the Class A clean room specifications.

Yang dedicated his life to improving the international image of Taiwan, and his work implicitly improved the development of the various industries in Taiwan. Additionally, the National Theater and Concert Hall also facilitated the performing arts development in Taiwan.

== Selected works ==
- Central Bank of the Republic of China (Taiwan)
- Shilin Official Residence (1950)
- ZTE Village ZTE Hall (1959)
- Cihu Mausoleum (formerly Cixi Hotel, 1959)
- Taipei Grand Mosque (1960)
- Taipei City Building (1961)
- Taiwan University Gymnasium (early phase) (1962)
- Lishan Guest House (1965)
- Kaohsiung Round Hill Hotel (1971)
- Round Hill Hotel (1973)
- Chiang Kai-shek Memorial Hall (1980)
- Central 100th Building (1986)
- National Music Hall (1987)
- National Theatre (1987)
