= Chiang Kai-shek Memorial Hall =

National monument in Taipei, Taiwan

- 中正紀念堂
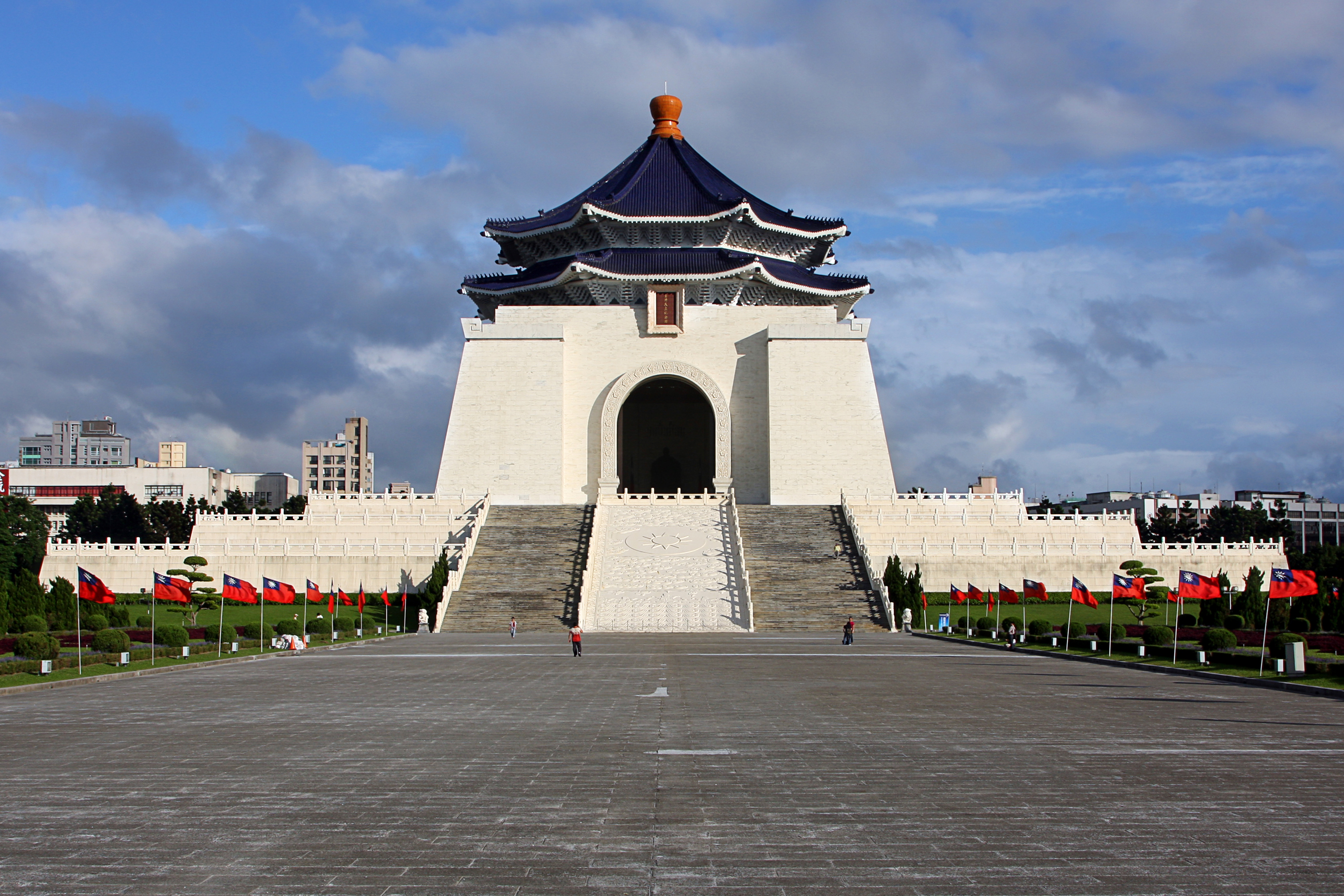
- Interactive map of Chiang Kai-shek Memorial Hall
- Location: Taipei, Taiwan
- Coordinates: 25°2′4″N 121°31′18″E
- Designer: Yang Cho-cheng
- Type: Memorial
- Material: Concrete and marble
- Height: 76 m (249 ft)
- Beginning date: October 31, 1976
- Completion date: April 5, 1980
- Dedicated to: Chiang Kai-shek
- Website: www.cksmh.gov.tw (in Chinese) www.cksmh.gov.tw/en (in English)

Chiang Kai-Shek Memorial Hall
- Traditional Chinese: 中正紀念堂
- Simplified Chinese: 中正纪念堂
Transcriptions
Standard Mandarin
- Hanyu Pinyin: Zhōngzhèng Jìniàntáng
- Wade–Giles: Chungcheng Chinient'ang
- IPA: [ʈʂʊ́ŋʈʂə̂ŋ tɕînjɛ̂ntʰǎŋ]
Southern Min
- Hokkien POJ: Tiong-chèng-kí-liām-tn̂g

The Chiang Kai-shek Memorial Hall (Chinese: 中正紀念堂; pinyin: zhōngzhèng jìniàntáng; Pe̍h-ōe-jī: Tiong-chèng-kí-liām-tn̂g) is a national monument and tourist attraction erected during Taiwan’s martial law period in memory of Chiang Kai-shek, former President of the Republic of China. In recent years, the site has also incorporated remembrance of Taiwan’s martial law period (1949–1987).

The monument, surrounded by a park, stands at the east end of Memorial Hall Square. It is flanked on the north and south by the National Theater and National Concert Hall. It has been likened by some to a Taiwanese analogue to the Lincoln Memorial.

== Description ==
The Memorial Hall is white with four sides. The roof is blue and octagonal, a shape that picks up the symbolism of the number eight, a number traditionally associated in Chinese culture with abundance and good fortune. Two sets of white stairs, each with 89 steps to represent Chiang's age at the time of his death, lead to the main entrance. The ground level of the memorial houses a library and a museum documenting Chiang Kai-shek's life and career, with exhibits detailing Taiwan's history and development. The upper level contains the main hall, in which a large statue of Chiang Kai-shek is located.

== Development ==
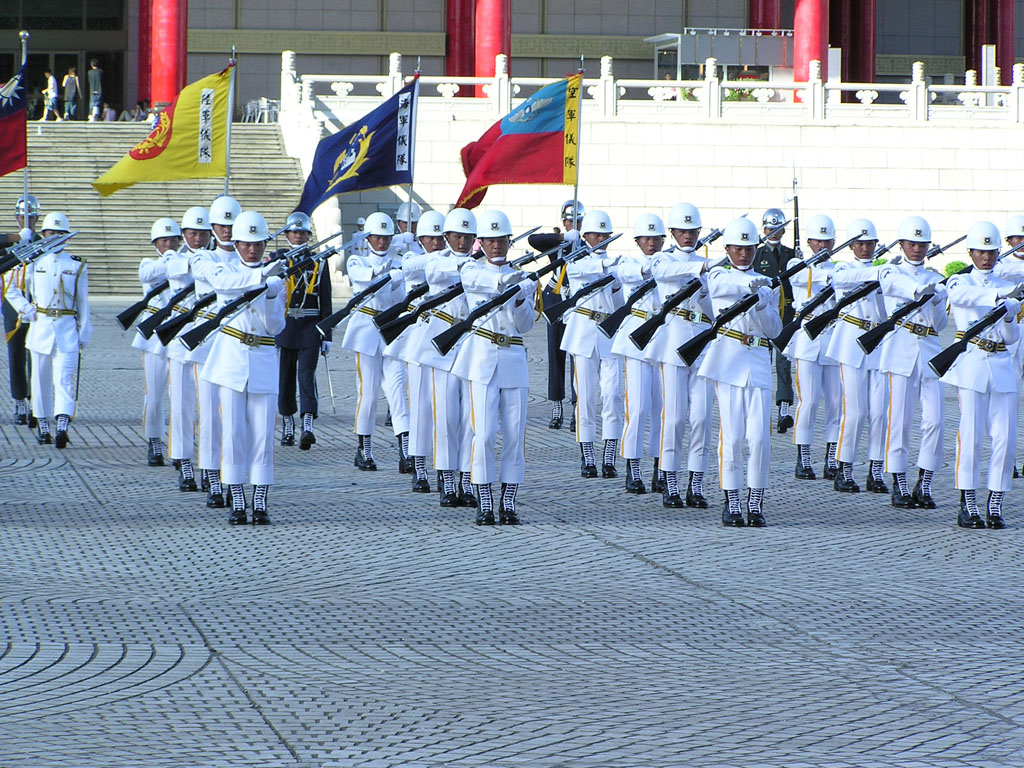
The Honor Guards of the Republic of China Armed Forces performing

After President Chiang Kai-shek died on April 5, 1975, the executive branch of the government established a Funeral Committee to build a memorial. The design, by architect Yang Cho-cheng, was chosen in a competition. Yang's design incorporated many elements of traditional Chinese architecture to mirror that of the Sun Yat-sen Mausoleum in Nanjing, China. (The Kuomintang (KMT) revered Dr. Sun as founder of the party and the government Chiang had led.) Groundbreaking for the memorial took place on October 31, 1976, the 90th anniversary of Chiang's birth. The hall officially opened on April 5, 1980, the fifth anniversary of the leader's death.

Yang's design placed the main building at the east end of the Chiang Kai-shek Memorial Park (中正紀念公園), covering over 240,000 square metres (290,000 sq yd) in Zhongzheng District. A main gate, the Gate of Great Centrality and Perfect Uprightness (大中至正) was placed at the west end on Chung Shan South Road, with a Gate of Great Loyalty (大忠門) standing at the north side on Hsin Yi (Xinyi) Road and a Gate of Great Piety (大孝門) standing at the south side on Ai Kuo (Aiguo) East Road. A Boulevard of Homage, bordered by manicured bushes, connected the main hall with the square.

== Subsequent history ==
The square became Taipei's site of choice for mass gatherings as soon as it opened. The nature of many of those gatherings gave the site new public meanings. The hall and square became the hub of events in the 1980s and early 1990s that ushered Taiwan into its era of modern democracy. Of the many pro-democracy demonstrations that took place at the square, the most influential were the Wild Lily student movement rallies of 1990. The movement provided the impetus for the far-reaching political reforms of President Lee Teng-hui. These culminated in the first popular elections of national leaders in 1996.

The site's importance in the development of Taiwan's democracy led to the plaza's rededication as Liberty Square by President Chen Shui-bian in 2007. The Memorial Hall was also renamed in a dedication to democracy. The announcement of the new names was greeted with hostility by Kuomintang officials. The original dedication to Chiang was subsequently restored to the hall by President Ma Ying-jeou, while the name Liberty Square was eventually affirmed by officials across party lines.

In 2017, on the occasion of the 70th anniversary of the February 28 Incident and the 30th anniversary of the lifting of martial law, Taiwan's Ministry of Culture announced plans to transform the hall into a national center for “facing history, recognizing agony, and respecting human rights.” Scholars and experts were invited to form an advisory group to help plan the hall's transformation. Public discussion of the transformation began the following year in forums held throughout Taiwan.

The Chinese inscription now over the main gate declares the plaza Liberty Square. The calligraphic style recalls that of Wang Xizhi in the East Jin Dynasty (see Chinese calligraphy). The style is noted for its sense of vitality, movement and freedom. The characters in the inscription are placed in left-to-right sequence to follow modern practice in Taiwan. (The right-to-left order of ancient Chinese tradition had been observed at the site up until then.)

In February 2017, during the administration of President Tsai Ing-wen, then Minister of Culture Cheng Li-chun promoted transitional justice reforms for the Chiang Kai-shek Memorial Hall. She invited experts and scholars to form an advisory committee on the memorial’s transformation, removed merchandise related to Chiang Kai-shek, stopped playing the “Chiang Kai-shek Memorial Song,” and renamed major exhibition and performance spaces—such as Zhongzheng Gallery, Jieshi Hall, Ruiyuan Hall, Zhiqing Hall, Meiling Gallery, Caiyu Gallery, and Zhongzheng Performance Hall—using numbers and floor designations instead.

On February 27 of the same year, Taiwan’s Ministry of Culture announced that, in order to avoid social tensions during the February 28 Memorial activities, the Chiang Kai-shek Memorial Hall would be closed for one day each year on February 28 starting that year.

In 2018, pro-independence student activists stormed the hall and threw paint on the statue of Chiang Kai-shek; two were arrested and penalized for NT$2,000.

In 2019 the Chiang Kai-shek Memorial Hall hosted an exhibition by the Chinese artist Ling Feng (靈峰). The 88 works exhibited were sharply critical of the Chinese Communist Party and authoritarianism in general.

On April 7, 2022, the former “Exhibition Room for Commemorating the Leader” was renamed the “Permanent Exhibition Hall,” and a new permanent exhibition titled “The Soul of Freedom vs. the Dictator – Taiwan’s Road to Freedom of Speech” was launched. This exhibition presents the struggles of non-Kuomintang democratic activists—such as Yang Kui, Lei Chen, Fu Zheng, Yin Haiguang, Peng Ming-min, Wei Ting-chao, Hsieh Tsung-min, Li Ao, Bo Yang, Huang Hsin-chieh, Kang Ning-hsiang, Shih Ming-teh, Cheng Nan-jung, Li Chen-yuan, Chen Shui-bian, Hsu Shih-hsien, Chen Chu, Irene, and Annette Lu—in their pursuit of freedom of speech under martial law. It is displayed alongside the existing permanent exhibition “President Chiang Kai-shek and the Republic of China,” presenting both achievements and controversies as a first step in the transformation.

In 2024, the Ministry of Culture announced the removal of military honor guards from the memorial as part of efforts to stop the promotion of a "cult of personality" around Chiang Kai-shek and "authoritarianism".

In July 2024, the Ministry of Culture required the honor guards stationed at the memorial to return to their primary duties of patrol training and maintaining site security, removing their previous role of standing guard in the statue hall. Starting July 15, the honor guard drill performances were moved to Democracy Boulevard in front of the main hall; the ceremony would be canceled in case of rain.

On November 24, 2025, the permanent exhibition on the right side of the hall—formerly “The Soul of Freedom vs. the Dictator – Taiwan’s Road to Freedom of Speech”—was updated to a new exhibition titled “Flowers of Freedom.” Using the metaphor of freedom as a flower’s core, the exhibition presents the history of Taiwan’s pursuit of democracy and freedom from 1945 to the present. It also introduced a bilingual Chinese-English format, added a comparative timeline of major global events related to democracy and human rights after World War II alongside Taiwan’s democratic milestones, and enhanced audiovisual, interactive, and object displays to illustrate how Taiwan cultivated and developed its democratic “Flowers of freedom.”CKS Memorial Hall launches exhibition on Taiwan’s democratic journey

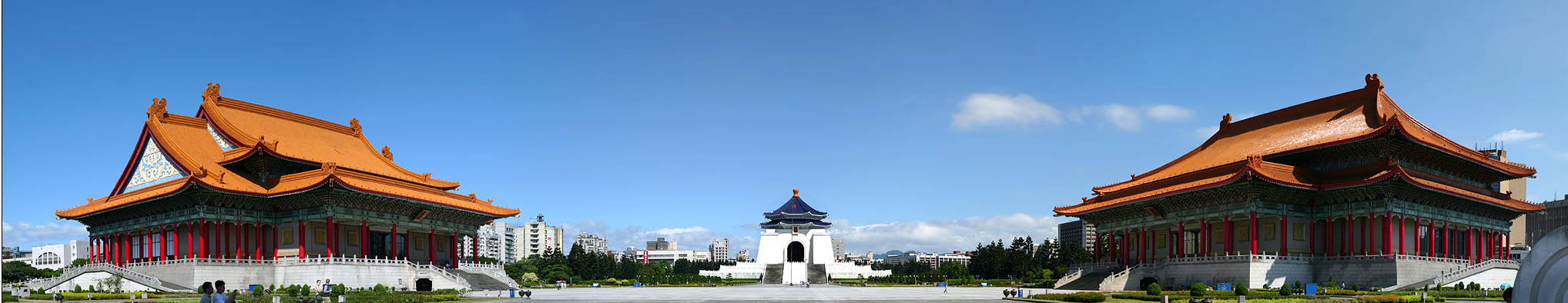
A panorama of Liberty Square, with the National Concert Hall (left) and the National Theater (right)

== Public transit ==
- Chiang Kai-shek Memorial Hall

== Gallery ==
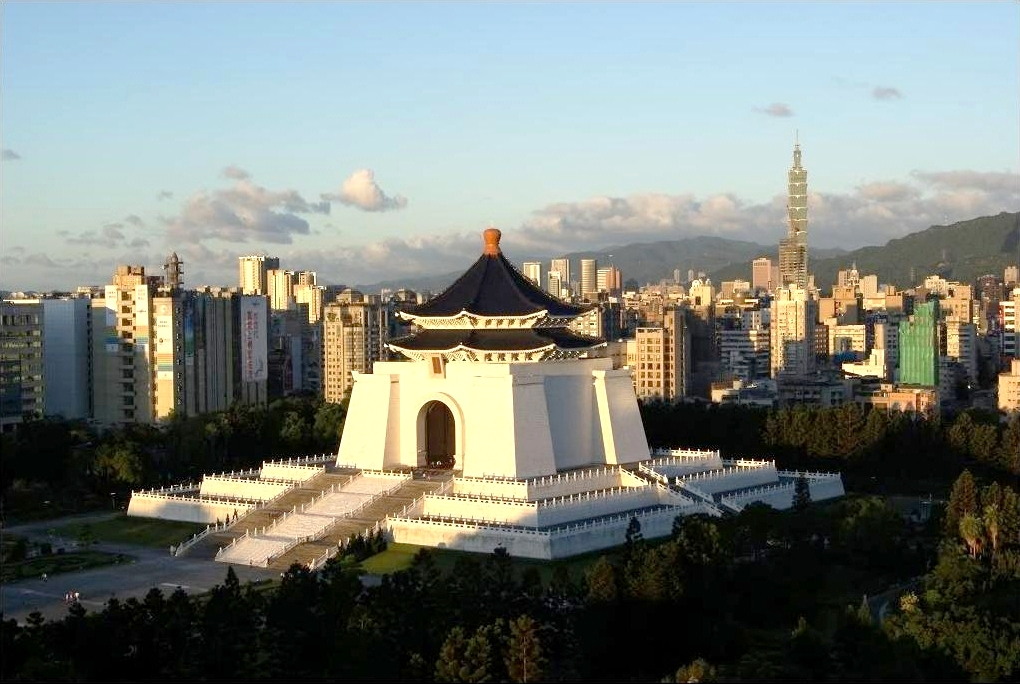
Aerial view of the Memorial Hall

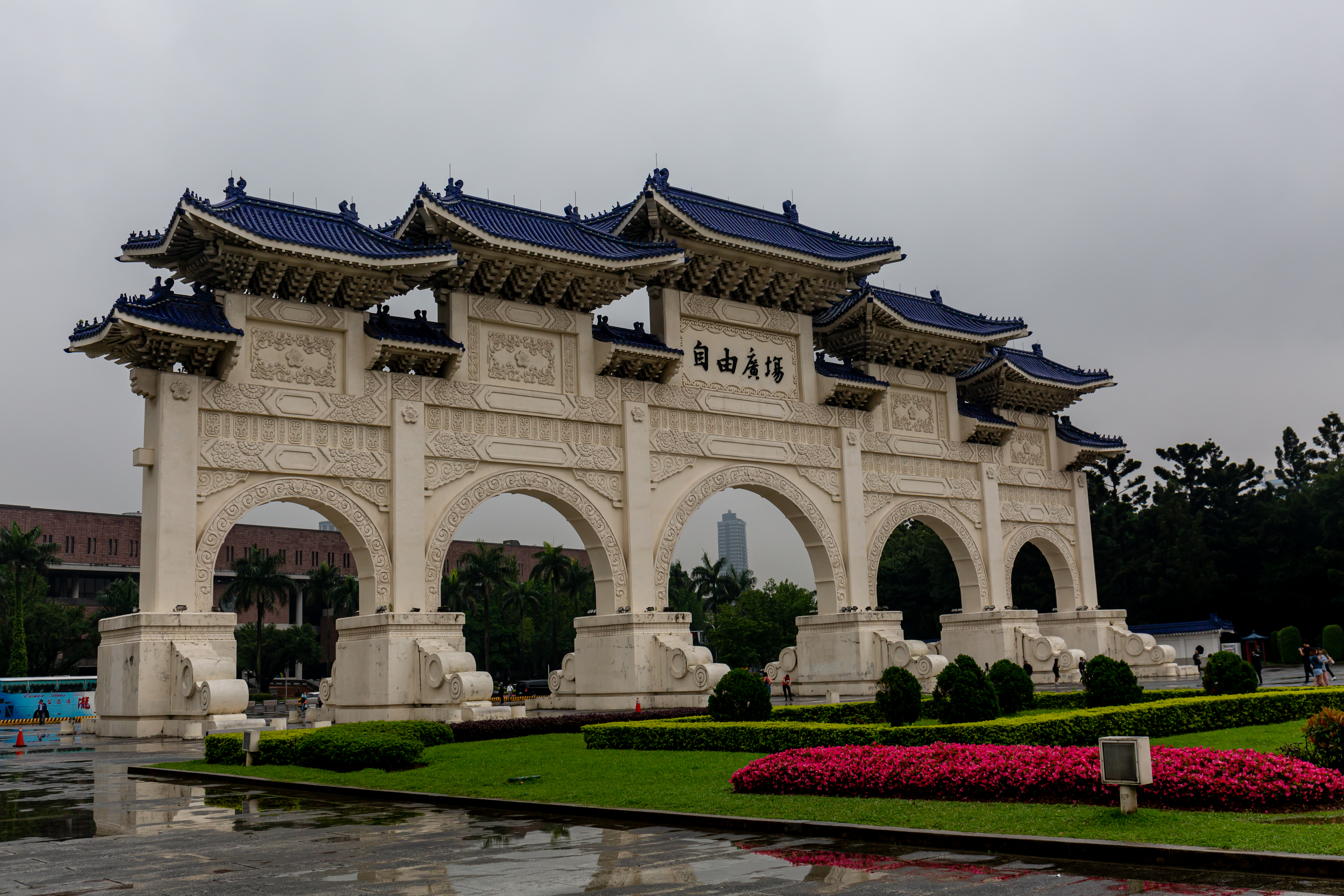
View of the front gate

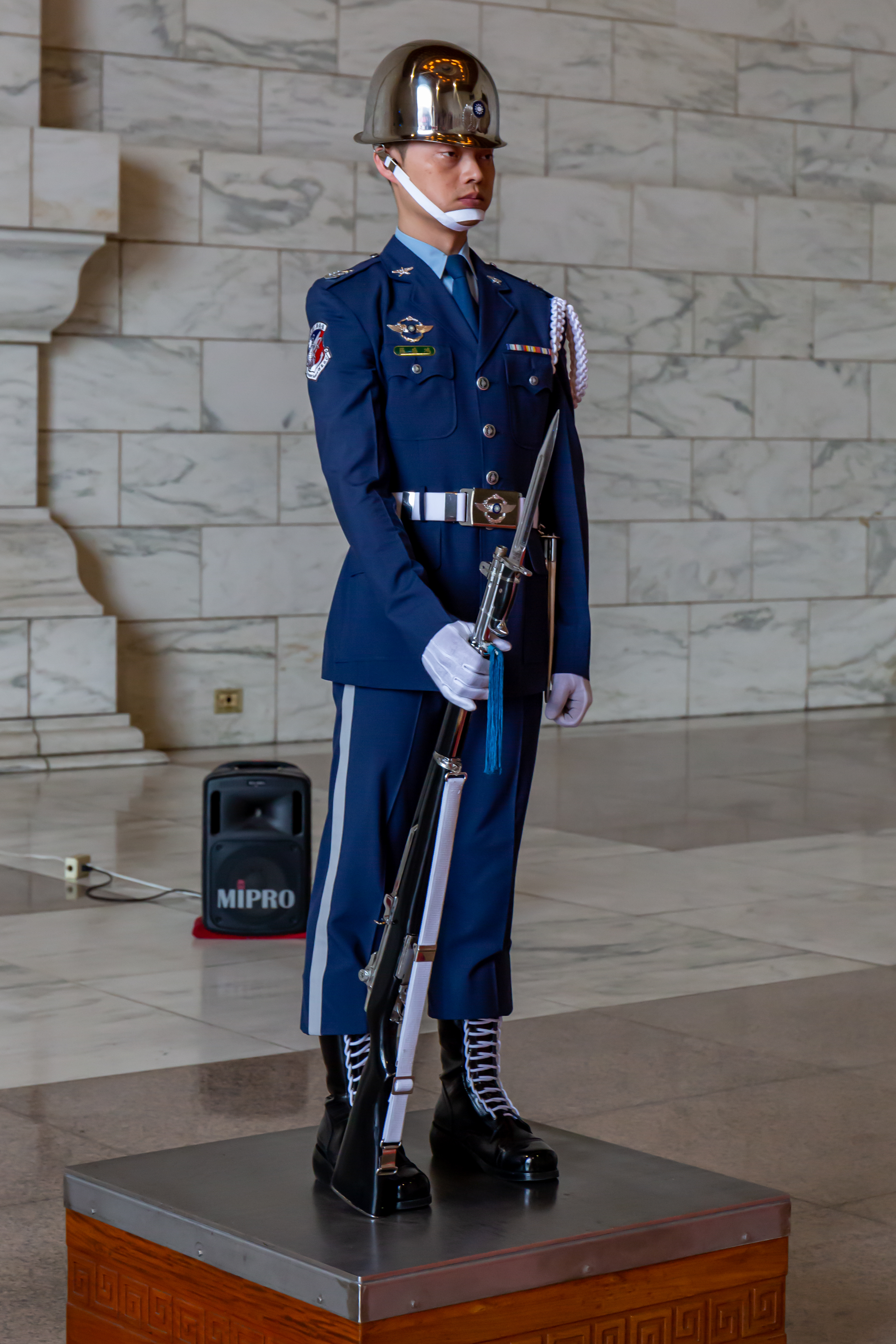
Guard in the main chamber

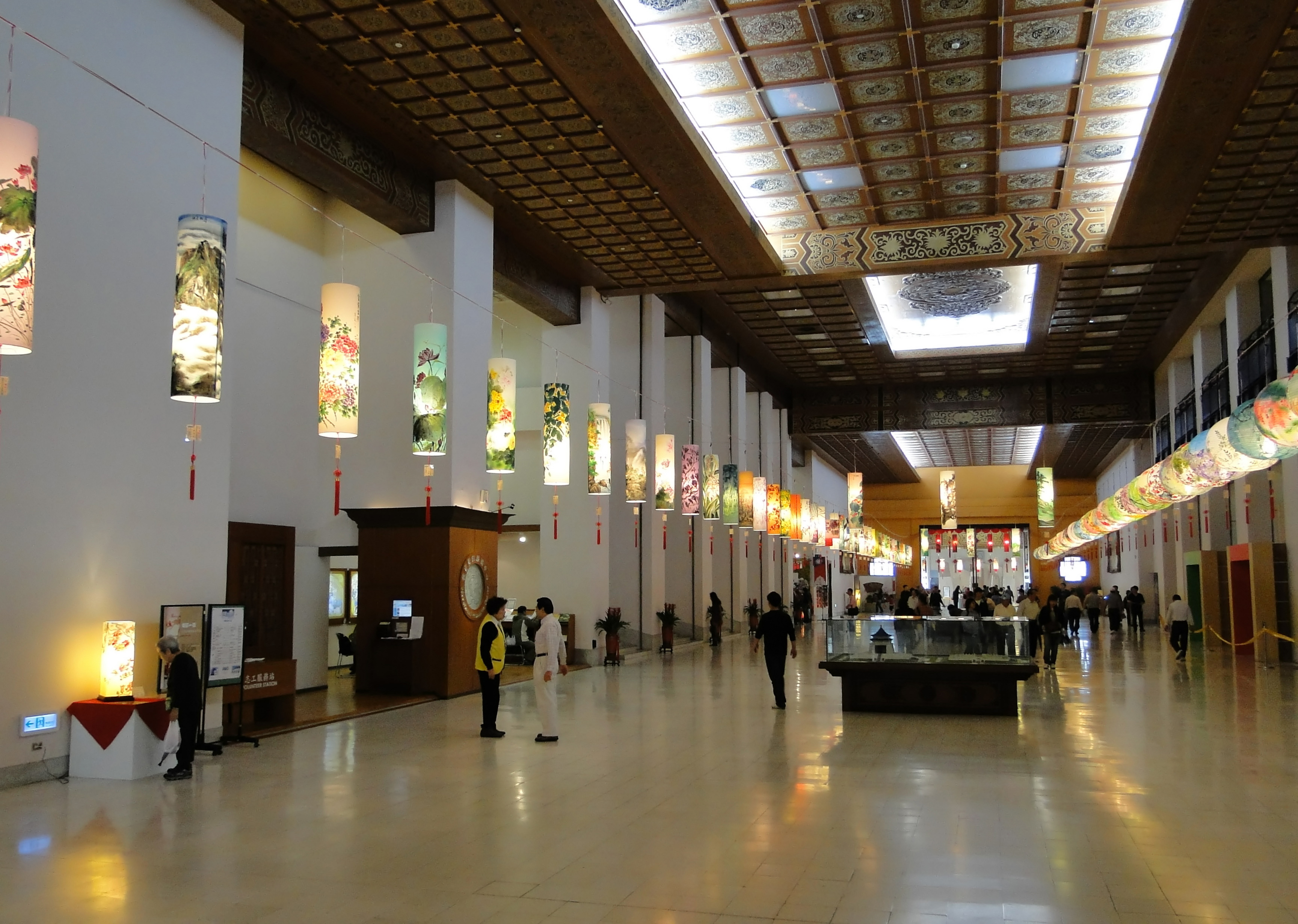
The lower level exhibition area

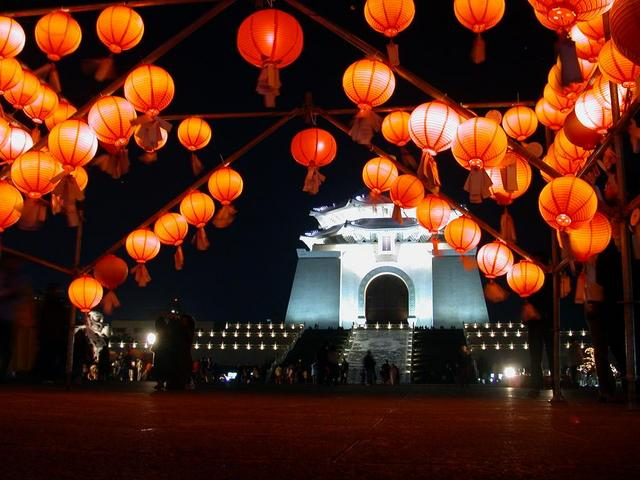
Taipei Lantern Festival festivities on the square (2004)

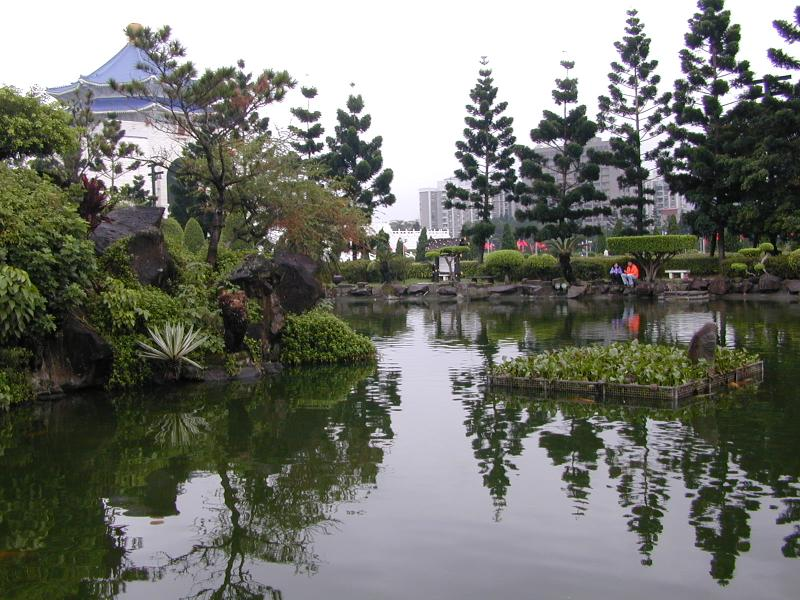
Gardens in the grounds of the Memorial Hall

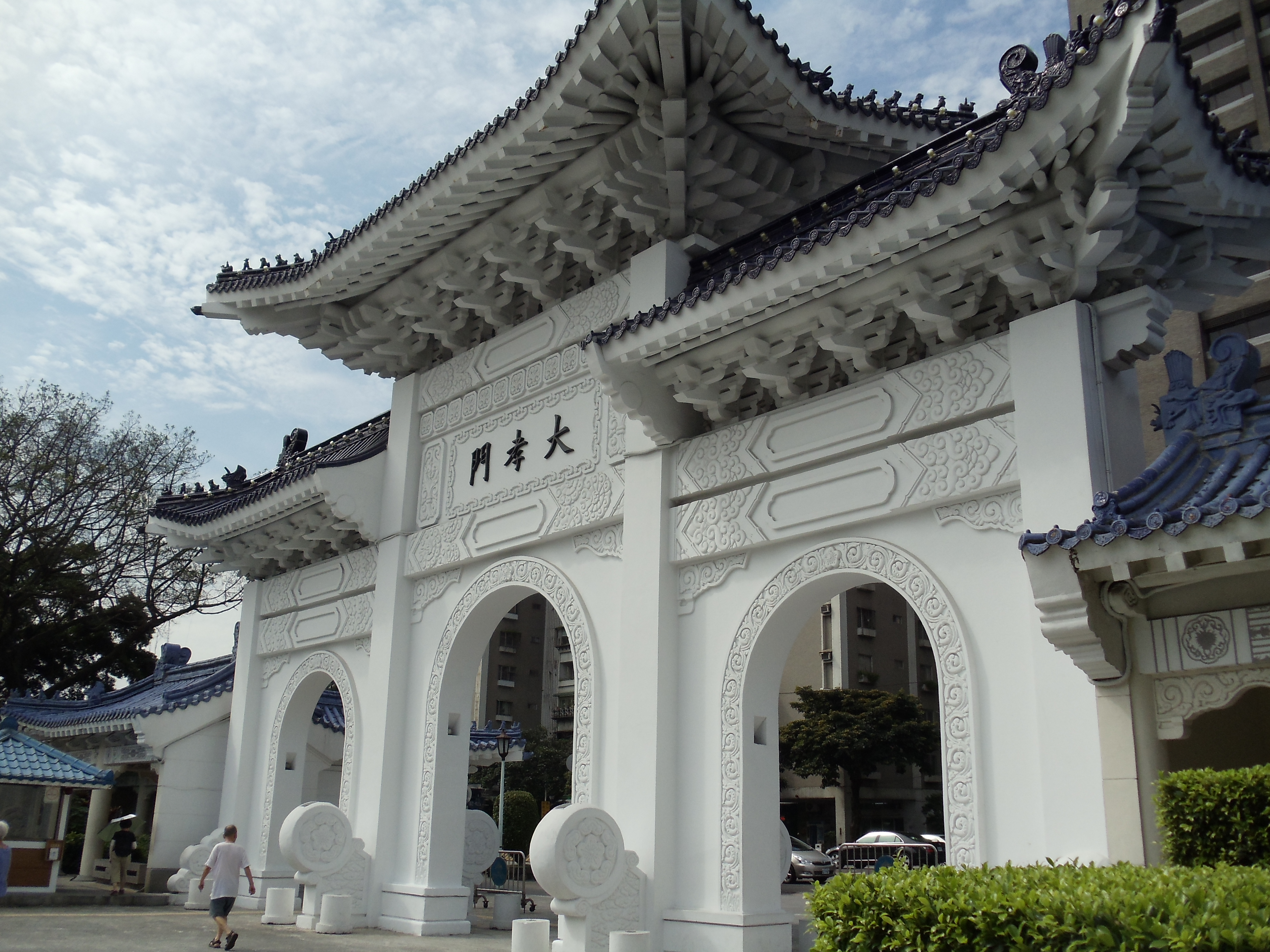
The Gate of Great Piety, a side gate

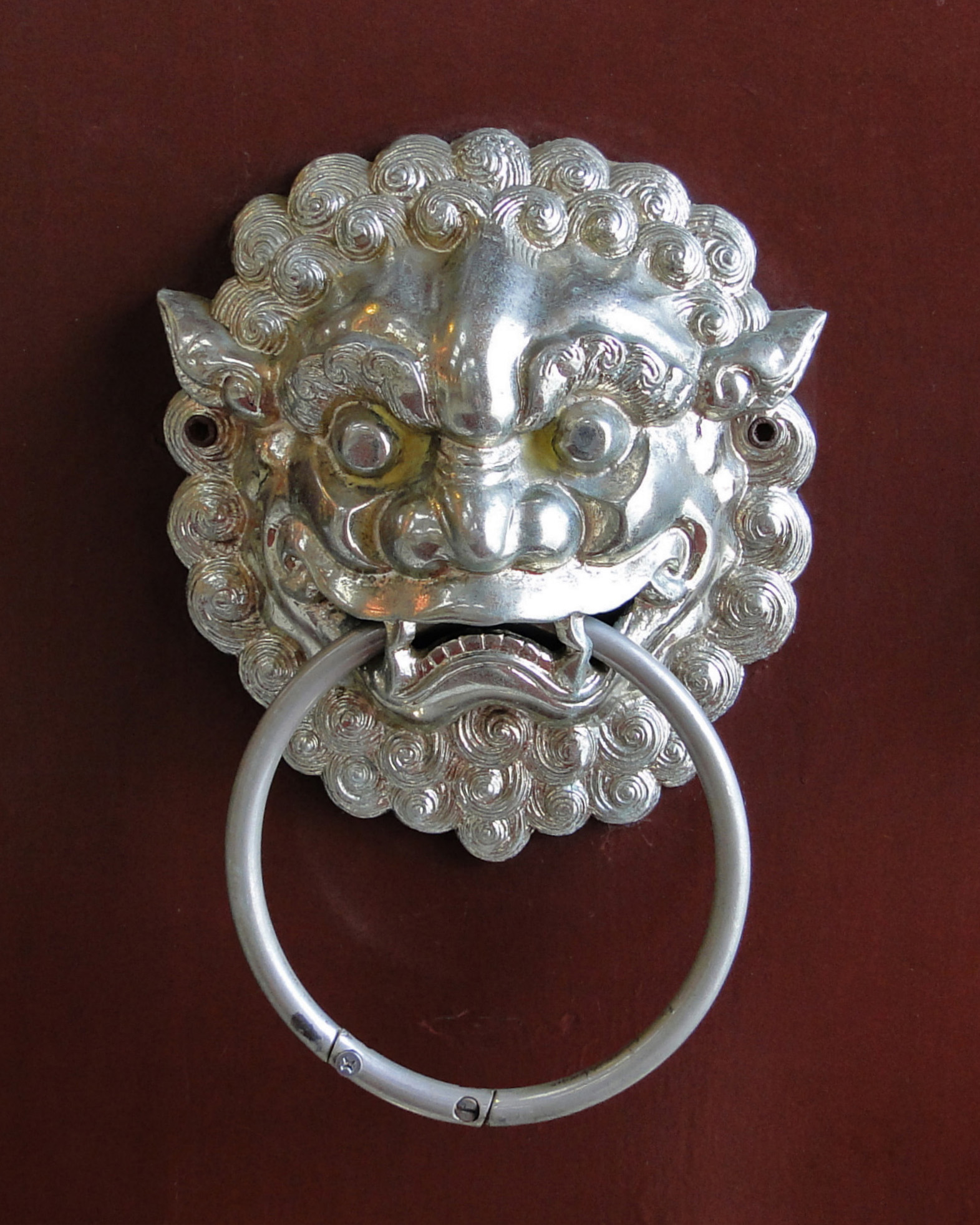
Door knocker on a lower level entrance

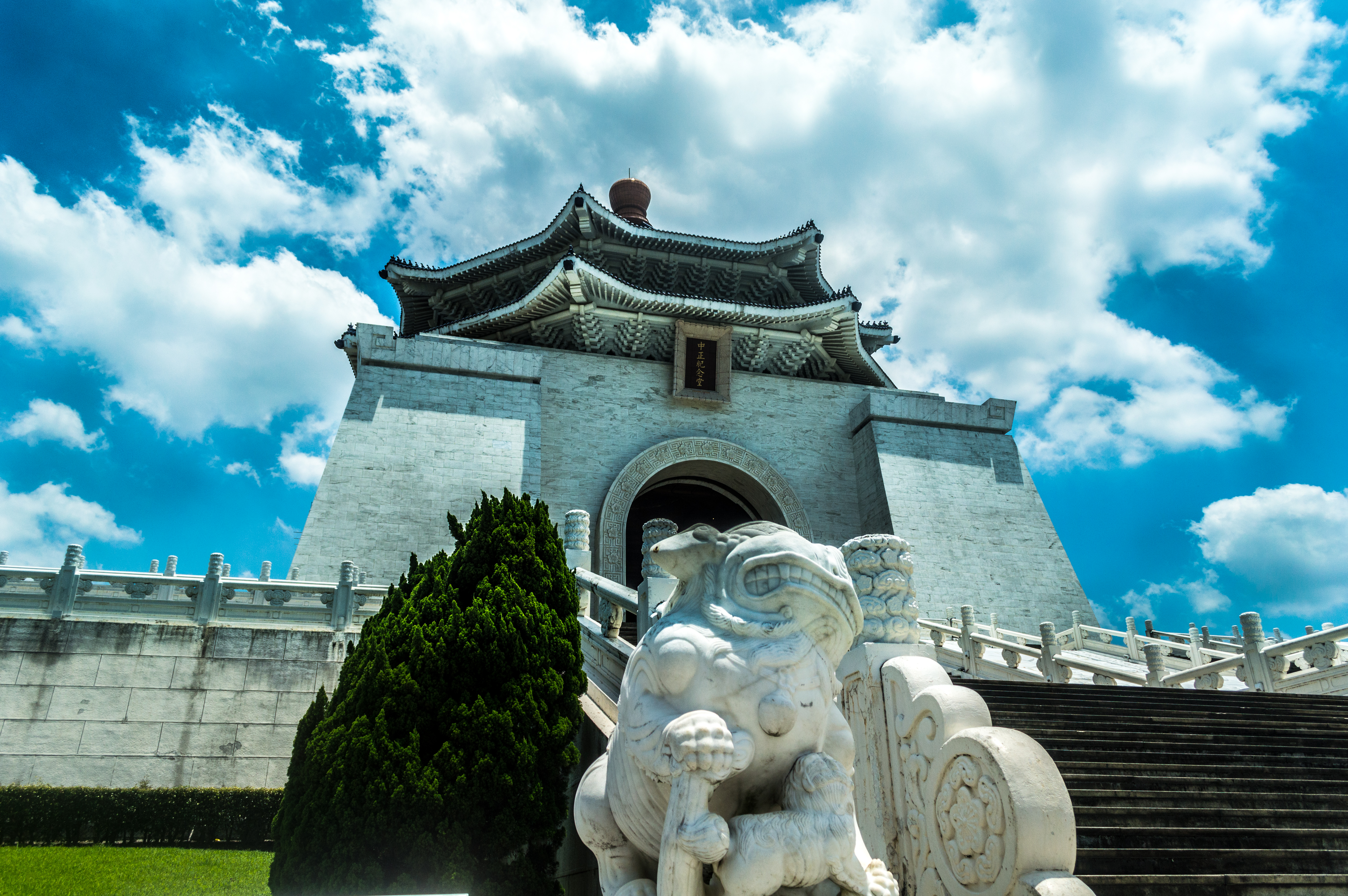
The Memorial Hall

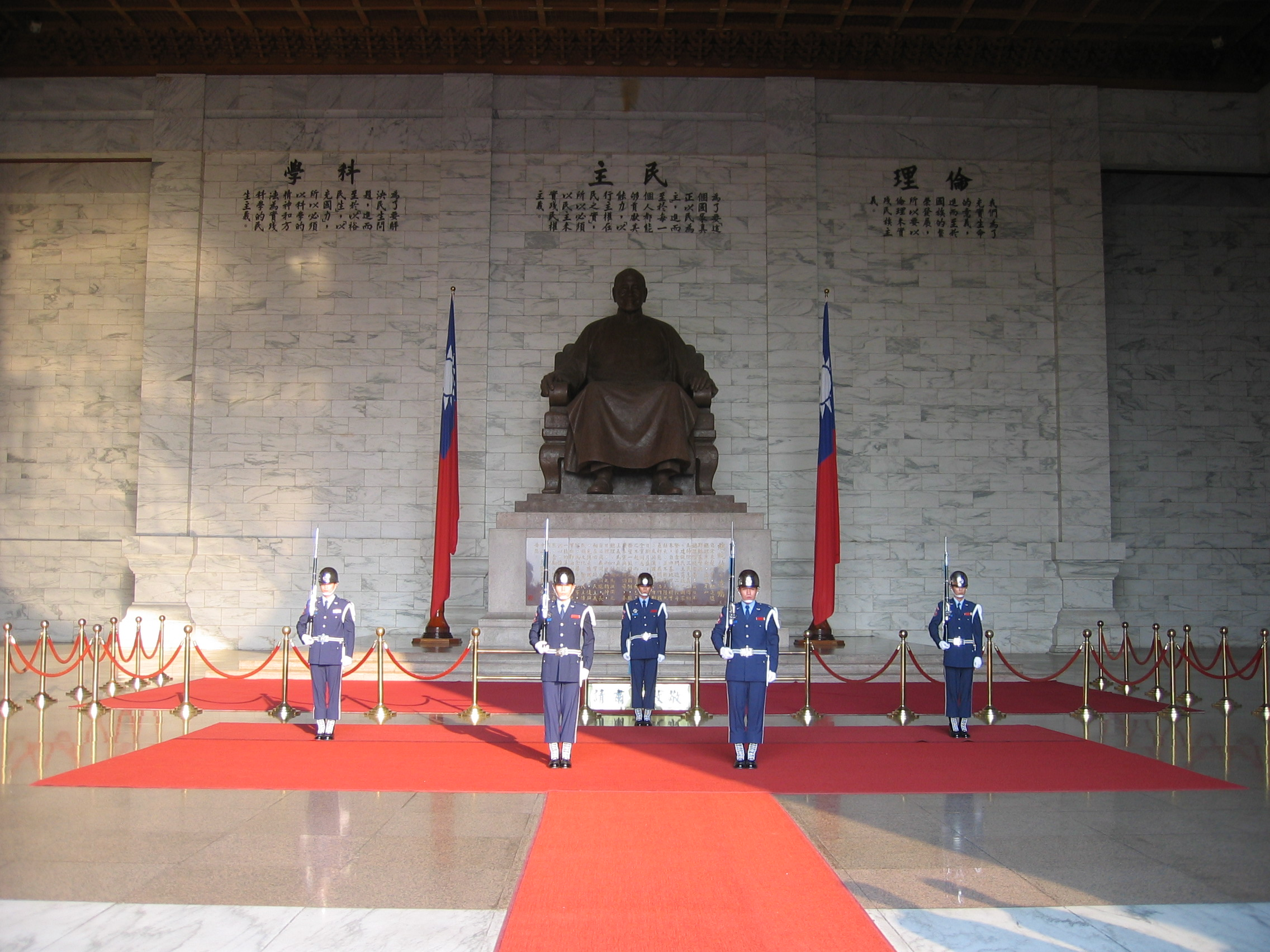
Chiang Kai-shek Memorial Hall Taipei Inside

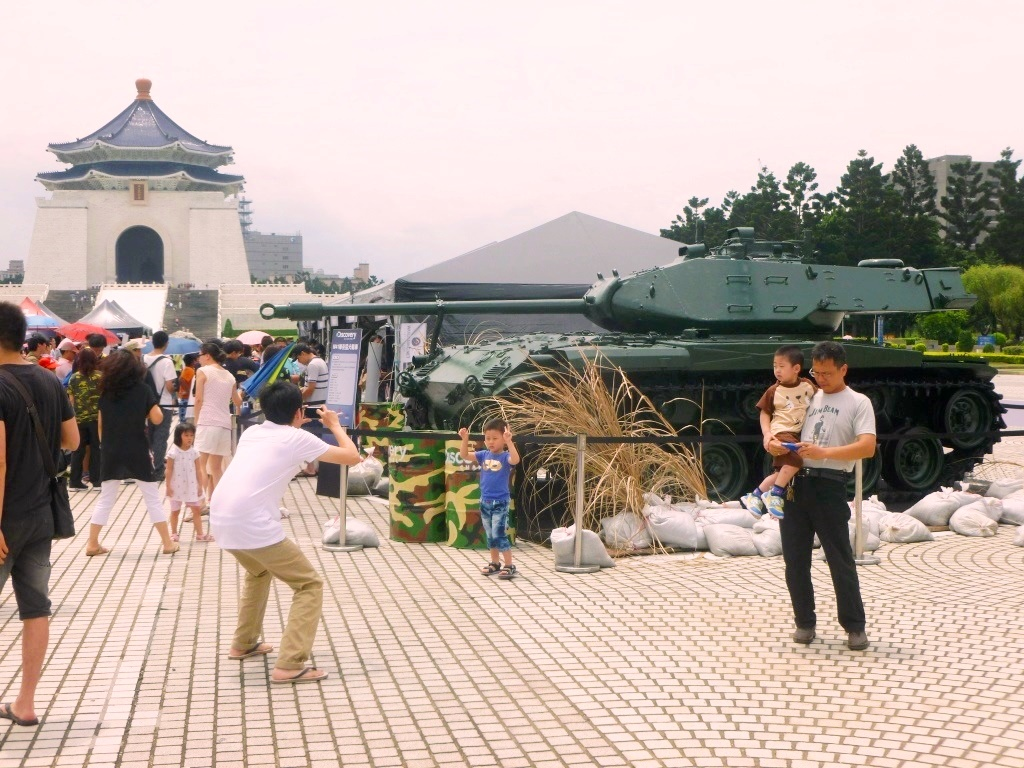
M41 Tank displayed next to Chiang Kai-shek Memorial for the Discovery Channel

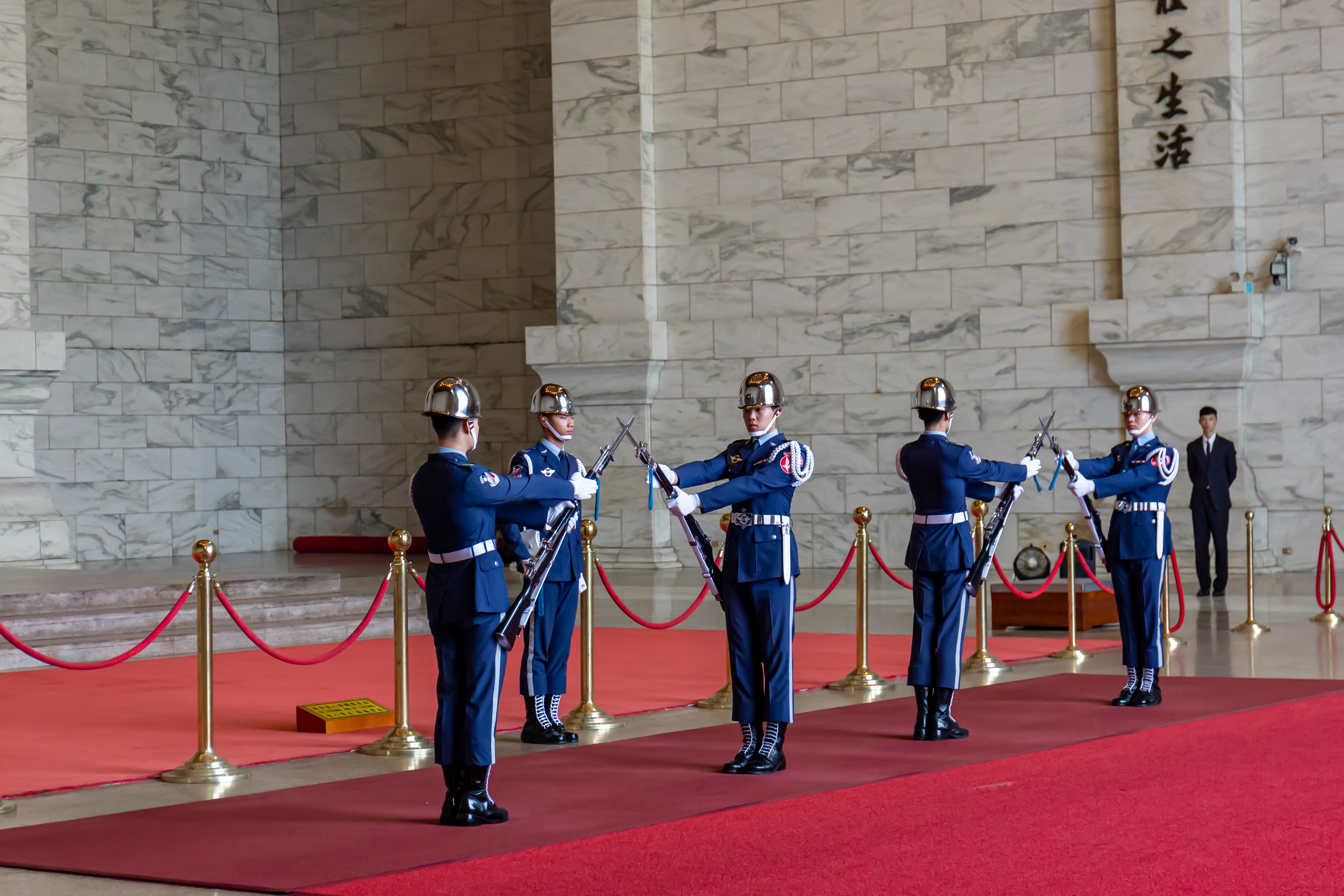
The changing of the guard ceremony

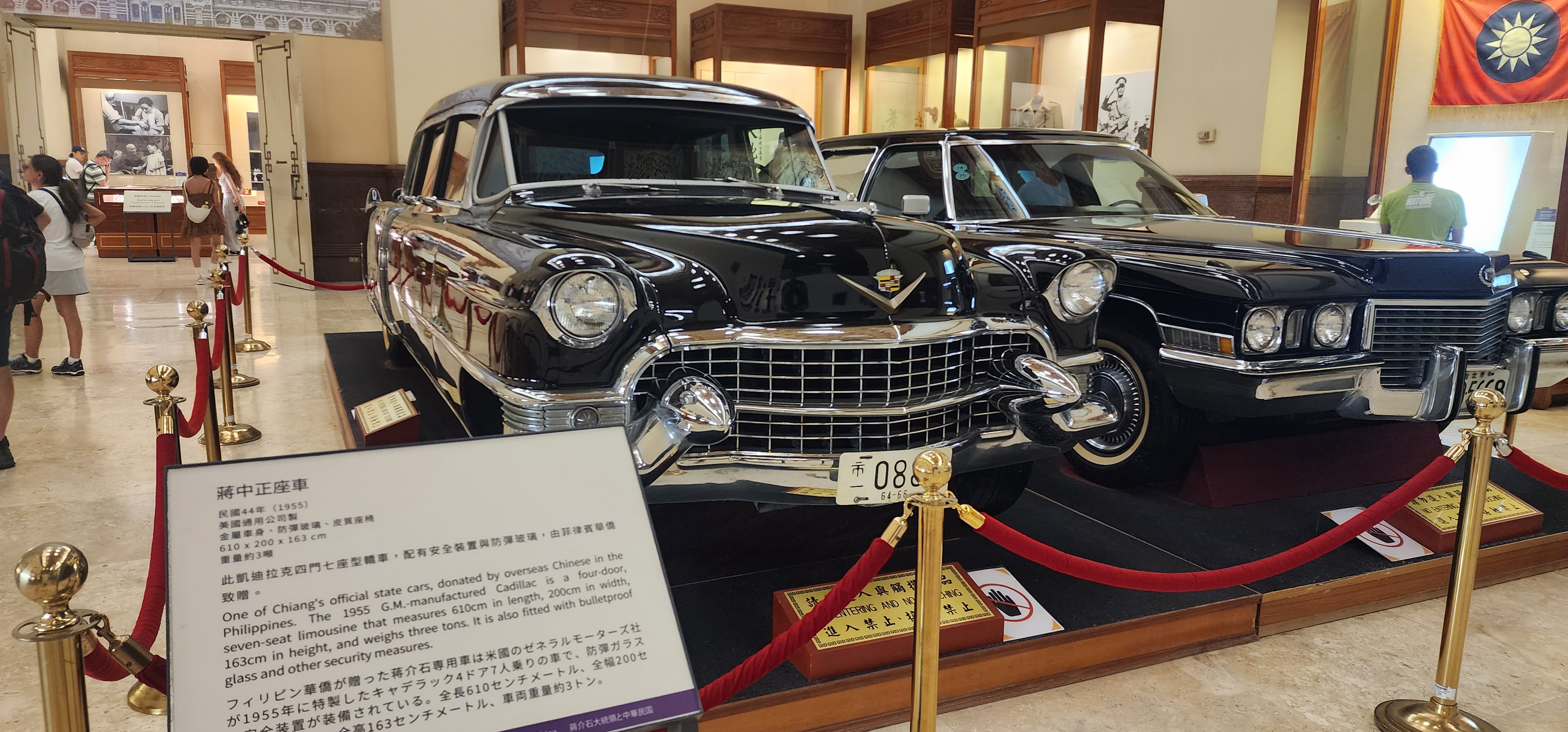
1955 Cadillac weighing three tons with bulletproof glass, donated to Chiang by overseas Chinese in the Philippines.

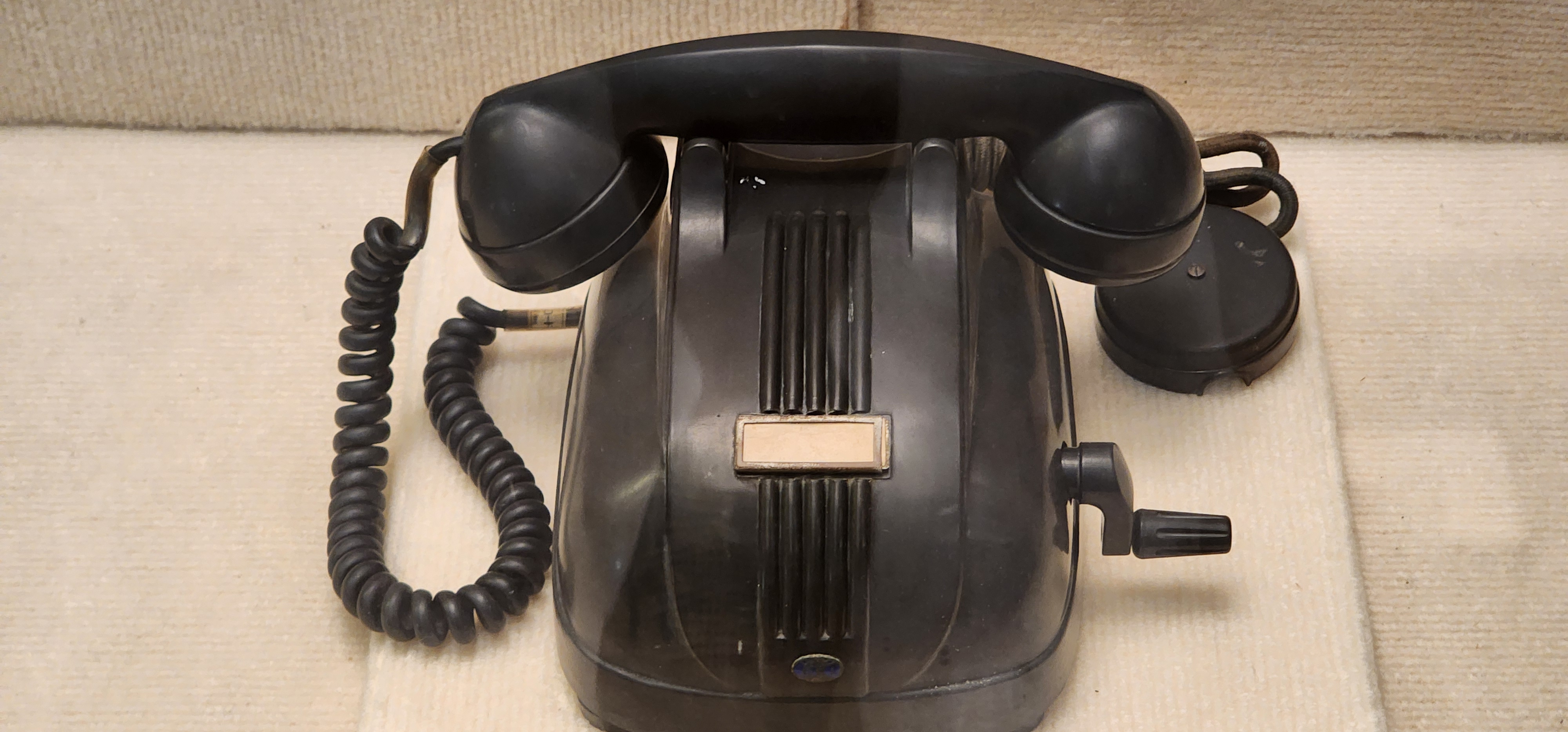
A hand-cranked telephone that Chiang used during the Second Sino-Japanese War.

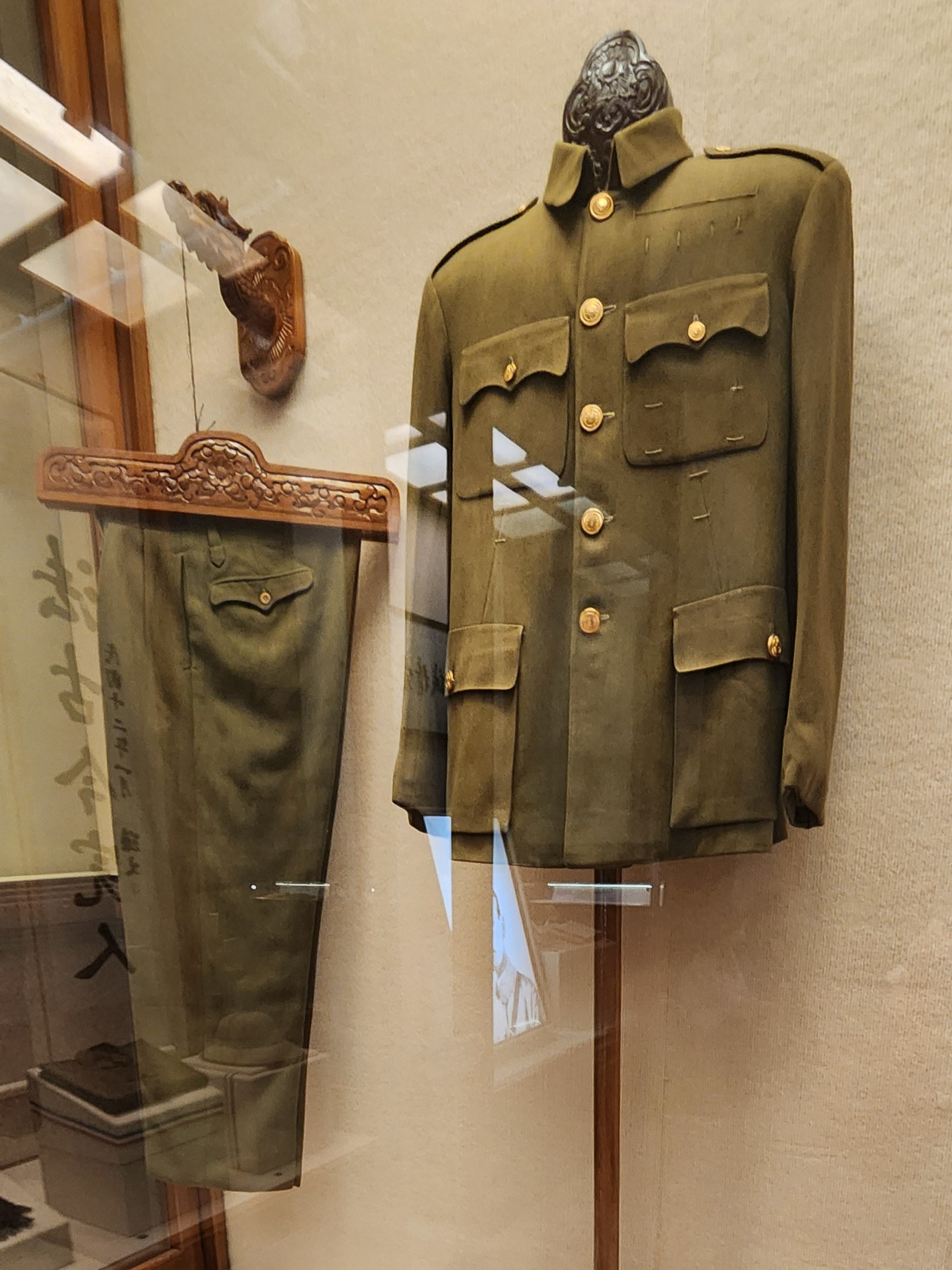
The class A service uniform that Chiang usually wore during the Chinese Civil War before World War II.

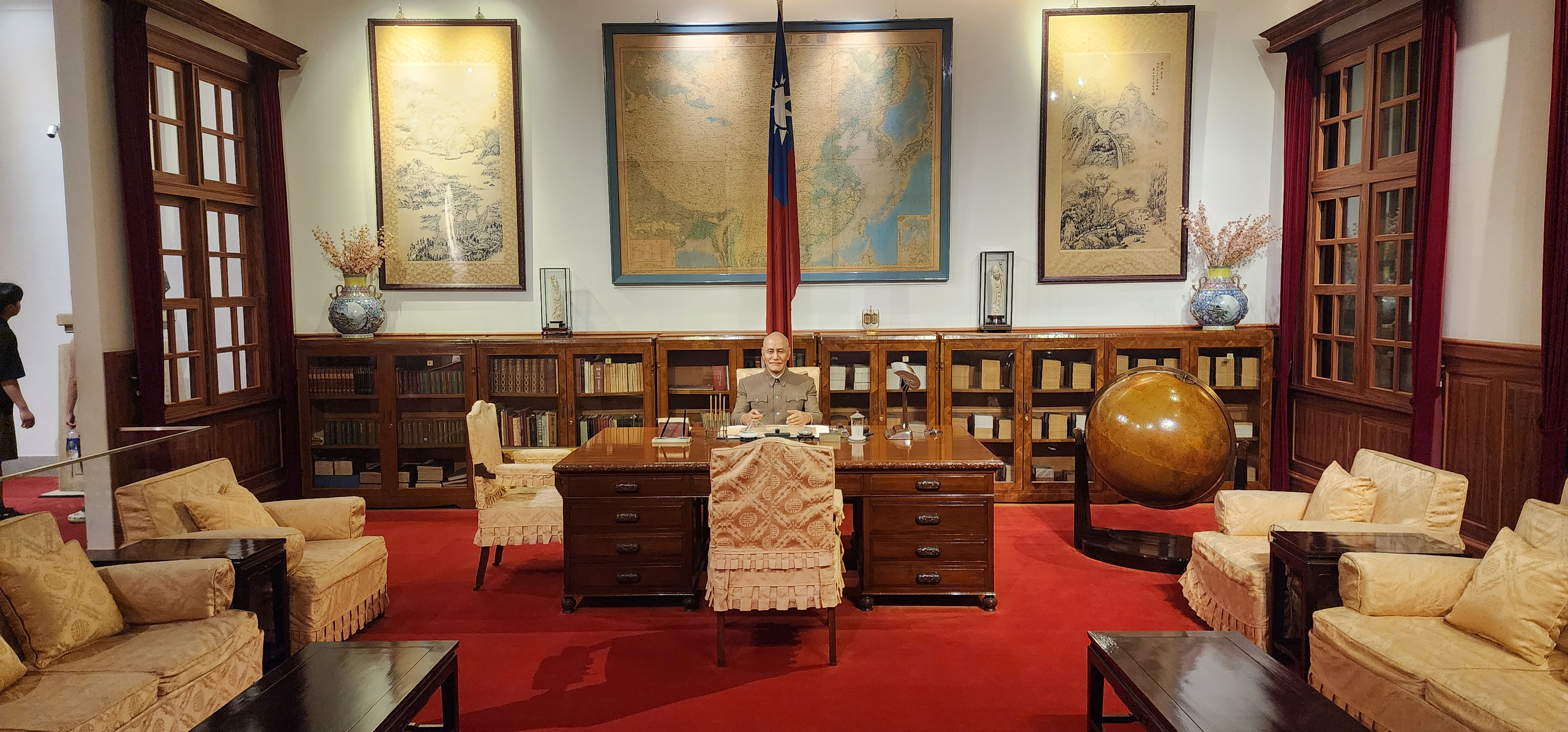
A 2015 reconstruction of Chiang's office, with original furniture and based on measurements of the Taiwan Green Room in the Presidential Office Building.

== See also ==
- National Theater and Concert Hall
- Presidential Office Building
- Wild Lily student movement
- List of museums in Taiwan
- Renaming of Chiang Kai-shek Memorial Hall
