= Wild Lily student movement =

1990 demonstration in Taiwan

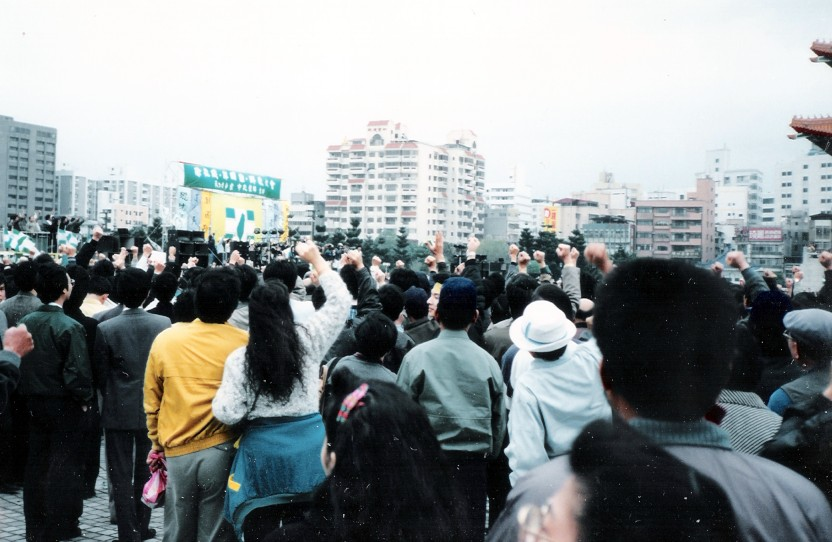
Wild Lily Movement protest at Memorial Hall Plaza, 18 March 1990

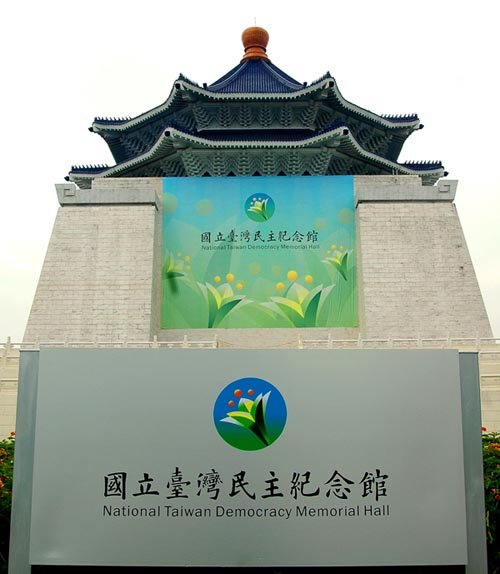
Wild Lily student movement of 1990 celebrated with banners in 2007

The Wild Lily student movement (Chinese: 野百合學運; pinyin: Yě Bǎihé xué yùn; Pe̍h-ōe-jī: Iá-pek-ha̍p ha̍k-ūn) or March student movement were a series of pro-democracy student demonstration in Taiwan which took place from 16-22 March 1990. The sit-in at Memorial Square in Taipei (since rededicated as Liberty Square in commemoration of the movement) was initiated by students from National Taiwan University. Participation quickly grew to 22,000 demonstrators. The Wild Lily demonstrators sought direct elections of Taiwan's president and vice president and new popular elections for all representatives in the National Assembly.

The demonstrations coincided with the inauguration of Lee Teng-hui on 21 March 1990 to a six-year term as president. The election Lee won was one in which only 641 members of the National Assembly voted, only one party was recognized, and one candidate ran. This process had been characteristic of one-party rule under the Kuomintang and Chiang Kai-shek.

Protesters wore white Formosa lilies and created giant replicas of the flower as a symbol of democracy. Their adoption of the flower as an icon of freedom evoked a long native tradition. Yang Yung-ming, a professor of political science at the National Taiwan University, described to the Taiwan Review in 2003:

For years, Taiwanese poets have employed this flower as a symbol of grace and resilience. The aboriginal poet Lin Yi-te, for example, often used it to symbolize the Taiwanese indigenous peoples' primitive purity of spirit, and used the flower's decline to dramatize the desolation and tragedy of their decline. It was Taiwanese literature's use of this wild lily [Lilium formosanum] as a metaphor of simplicity and fortitude that inspired its use by those in the student democracy movement.

On the first day of his new term, Lee Teng-hui welcomed fifty students to the Presidential Building. He expressed his support of the students' goals and promised full democracy in Taiwan beginning with reforms to be initiated that summer.

The Wild Lily student movement marked a crucial turning point in Taiwan's transition to pluralistic democracy. Six years later, Lee became Taiwan's first popularly elected leader, taking 54% of the vote in an election in which over 95% of eligible voters participated. Democracy supporters continue to gather at Liberty Square every 21 March to commemorate the event. Officials affiliated with the Taiwan Solidarity Union have advocated moving Taiwan's Youth Day to 21 March in recognition of the students' achievement.

On the eve of the fifteenth anniversary of the ill-fated student democracy protests in China's Tiananmen Square, Lee's successor Chen Shui-bian noted that the Wild Lily student movement had taken place only a year after the events in Beijing. He noted the contrast in the way the governments responded. "The most memorable impression of the Tiananmen incident of June 4th is that of that small, thin person holding up a line of tanks, which was a heroic and disturbing impression," he said. "The March Student Movement, in pressing for the establishment of a national affairs conference, changing the way the Legislative Yuan and the National Assembly are elected and a consensus on realizing the direct election of the president, also set a timetable for reform." The National Assembly voted to dissolve itself in 2005.

== See also ==
- Sunflower Student Movement
- Wild Strawberries Movement
- Taiwanization
- 1989 Tiananmen Square protests and massacre
