= List of minor planets: 281001–282000 =

The following is a partial list of minor planets, running from minor-planet number 281001 through 282000, inclusive. The primary data for this and other partial lists is based on JPL's "Small-Body Orbital Elements" and data available from the Minor Planet Center. Critical list information is also provided by the MPC, unless otherwise specified from Lowell Observatory. A detailed description of the table's columns and additional sources are given on the main page including a complete list of every page in this series, and a statistical break-up on the dynamical classification of minor planets.

Also see the summary list of all named bodies in numerical and alphabetical order, and the corresponding naming citations for the number range of this particular list. New namings may only be added to this list after official publication, as the preannouncement of names is condemned by the Working Group for Small Bodies Nomenclature of the International Astronomical Union.

Near-Earth obj.	MBA (inner)	MBA (outer)	Centaur
Mars-crosser	MBA (middle)	Jupiter trojan	Trans-Neptunian obj.
Unclassified

== 281001–281100 ==
Designation			Discovery			Properties		Ref
Permanent	Provisional	Named after	Date	Site	Discoverer(s)	Category	Diam.	Ref
281001	2006 DT_{141}	—	February 25, 2006	Kitt Peak	Spacewatch	·	1.8 km	MPC · JPL
281002	2006 DB_{164}	—	February 27, 2006	Mount Lemmon	Mount Lemmon Survey	·	2.3 km	MPC · JPL
281003	2006 DJ_{171}	—	February 27, 2006	Kitt Peak	Spacewatch	·	2.1 km	MPC · JPL
281004	2006 DB_{181}	—	February 27, 2006	Kitt Peak	Spacewatch	·	2.5 km	MPC · JPL
281005	2006 DH_{191}	—	February 27, 2006	Kitt Peak	Spacewatch	·	2.7 km	MPC · JPL
281006	2006 DW_{203}	—	February 23, 2006	Anderson Mesa	LONEOS	·	2.2 km	MPC · JPL
281007 Oliviaperrotto	2006 DR_{204}	Oliviaperrotto	February 27, 2006	Catalina	CSS	TRE	5.1 km	MPC · JPL
281008	2006 DU_{207}	—	February 25, 2006	Kitt Peak	Spacewatch	·	4.3 km	MPC · JPL
281009	2006 DN_{208}	—	February 25, 2006	Kitt Peak	Spacewatch	·	2.0 km	MPC · JPL
281010	2006 DJ_{215}	—	February 25, 2006	Mount Lemmon	Mount Lemmon Survey	JUN	1.4 km	MPC · JPL
281011	2006 ET_{2}	—	March 2, 2006	Kitt Peak	Spacewatch	·	1.5 km	MPC · JPL
281012	2006 EA_{11}	—	March 2, 2006	Kitt Peak	Spacewatch	·	1.7 km	MPC · JPL
281013	2006 EE_{13}	—	March 2, 2006	Kitt Peak	Spacewatch	NEM	2.6 km	MPC · JPL
281014	2006 EC_{21}	—	March 3, 2006	Kitt Peak	Spacewatch	·	3.1 km	MPC · JPL
281015	2006 EJ_{32}	—	March 3, 2006	Mount Lemmon	Mount Lemmon Survey	·	1.9 km	MPC · JPL
281016	2006 EH_{37}	—	March 3, 2006	Kitt Peak	Spacewatch	·	2.3 km	MPC · JPL
281017	2006 EV_{60}	—	March 5, 2006	Kitt Peak	Spacewatch	HNS	1.5 km	MPC · JPL
281018	2006 ED_{63}	—	March 5, 2006	Kitt Peak	Spacewatch	·	2.0 km	MPC · JPL
281019	2006 EB_{65}	—	March 5, 2006	Kitt Peak	Spacewatch	·	2.1 km	MPC · JPL
281020	2006 EH_{65}	—	March 5, 2006	Kitt Peak	Spacewatch	GEF	1.4 km	MPC · JPL
281021	2006 EX_{68}	—	March 2, 2006	Kitt Peak	M. W. Buie	·	1.3 km	MPC · JPL
281022	2006 EV_{69}	—	March 9, 2006	Catalina	CSS	H	760 m	MPC · JPL
281023	2006 FZ_{5}	—	March 23, 2006	Mount Lemmon	Mount Lemmon Survey	EUP	3.9 km	MPC · JPL
281024	2006 FH_{53}	—	March 25, 2006	Kitt Peak	Spacewatch	KOR	1.9 km	MPC · JPL
281025	2006 GR	—	April 2, 2006	Piszkéstető	K. Sárneczky	·	1.9 km	MPC · JPL
281026	2006 GU_{4}	—	April 2, 2006	Kitt Peak	Spacewatch	·	2.4 km	MPC · JPL
281027	2006 GK_{13}	—	April 2, 2006	Kitt Peak	Spacewatch	AGN	1.5 km	MPC · JPL
281028	2006 GS_{14}	—	April 2, 2006	Kitt Peak	Spacewatch	AGN	1.5 km	MPC · JPL
281029	2006 GU_{14}	—	April 2, 2006	Kitt Peak	Spacewatch	·	2.7 km	MPC · JPL
281030	2006 GF_{30}	—	April 2, 2006	Mount Lemmon	Mount Lemmon Survey	·	3.1 km	MPC · JPL
281031	2006 GS_{45}	—	April 8, 2006	Kitt Peak	Spacewatch	MRX	1.3 km	MPC · JPL
281032	2006 GX_{54}	—	April 8, 2006	Kitt Peak	Spacewatch	KOR	1.6 km	MPC · JPL
281033	2006 HF_{9}	—	April 19, 2006	Kitt Peak	Spacewatch	MRX	1.2 km	MPC · JPL
281034	2006 HP_{12}	—	April 19, 2006	Mount Lemmon	Mount Lemmon Survey	MRX	1.3 km	MPC · JPL
281035	2006 HM_{21}	—	April 20, 2006	Kitt Peak	Spacewatch	DOR	2.7 km	MPC · JPL
281036	2006 HB_{22}	—	April 20, 2006	Kitt Peak	Spacewatch	·	1.9 km	MPC · JPL
281037	2006 HS_{22}	—	April 20, 2006	Kitt Peak	Spacewatch	·	3.2 km	MPC · JPL
281038	2006 HE_{27}	—	April 20, 2006	Kitt Peak	Spacewatch	·	2.8 km	MPC · JPL
281039	2006 HX_{36}	—	April 21, 2006	Kitt Peak	Spacewatch	TIR	3.3 km	MPC · JPL
281040	2006 HY_{39}	—	April 21, 2006	Kitt Peak	Spacewatch	·	2.6 km	MPC · JPL
281041	2006 HV_{46}	—	April 20, 2006	Kitt Peak	Spacewatch	·	3.0 km	MPC · JPL
281042	2006 HE_{50}	—	April 26, 2006	Kitt Peak	Spacewatch	·	2.5 km	MPC · JPL
281043	2006 HO_{51}	—	April 26, 2006	Reedy Creek	J. Broughton	EUN	2.2 km	MPC · JPL
281044	2006 HF_{60}	—	April 26, 2006	Anderson Mesa	LONEOS	·	2.7 km	MPC · JPL
281045	2006 HL_{66}	—	April 24, 2006	Kitt Peak	Spacewatch	KOR	1.4 km	MPC · JPL
281046	2006 HF_{90}	—	January 13, 2005	Catalina	CSS	HNS ·	2.3 km	MPC · JPL
281047	2006 HL_{110}	—	April 26, 2006	Siding Spring	SSS	·	2.8 km	MPC · JPL
281048	2006 HA_{116}	—	April 26, 2006	Mount Lemmon	Mount Lemmon Survey	AGN	1.2 km	MPC · JPL
281049	2006 HQ_{123}	—	April 24, 2006	Kitt Peak	Spacewatch	·	2.0 km	MPC · JPL
281050	2006 HG_{124}	—	April 26, 2006	Cerro Tololo	M. W. Buie	KOR	1.5 km	MPC · JPL
281051	2006 HP_{124}	—	April 26, 2006	Cerro Tololo	M. W. Buie	AGN	1.2 km	MPC · JPL
281052	2006 HH_{153}	—	April 20, 2006	Kitt Peak	Spacewatch	KOR	1.7 km	MPC · JPL
281053	2006 JD_{12}	—	May 1, 2006	Kitt Peak	Spacewatch	EOS	2.2 km	MPC · JPL
281054	2006 JE_{17}	—	May 2, 2006	Kitt Peak	Spacewatch	·	2.4 km	MPC · JPL
281055	2006 JE_{39}	—	May 6, 2006	Mount Lemmon	Mount Lemmon Survey	·	4.2 km	MPC · JPL
281056	2006 JT_{63}	—	May 1, 2006	Kitt Peak	M. W. Buie	·	1.5 km	MPC · JPL
281057	2006 KO_{4}	—	May 19, 2006	Mount Lemmon	Mount Lemmon Survey	EOS	2.0 km	MPC · JPL
281058	2006 KZ_{4}	—	May 19, 2006	Mount Lemmon	Mount Lemmon Survey	·	1.8 km	MPC · JPL
281059	2006 KF_{13}	—	May 20, 2006	Kitt Peak	Spacewatch	·	4.5 km	MPC · JPL
281060	2006 KE_{26}	—	May 20, 2006	Kitt Peak	Spacewatch	·	2.7 km	MPC · JPL
281061	2006 KR_{27}	—	May 20, 2006	Kitt Peak	Spacewatch	·	2.9 km	MPC · JPL
281062	2006 KQ_{33}	—	May 20, 2006	Kitt Peak	Spacewatch	KOR	1.8 km	MPC · JPL
281063	2006 KH_{46}	—	May 21, 2006	Mount Lemmon	Mount Lemmon Survey	KOR	1.5 km	MPC · JPL
281064	2006 KE_{73}	—	May 23, 2006	Kitt Peak	Spacewatch	·	2.4 km	MPC · JPL
281065	2006 KJ_{83}	—	May 20, 2006	Palomar	NEAT	·	3.2 km	MPC · JPL
281066	2006 KT_{122}	—	May 22, 2006	Kitt Peak	Spacewatch	·	2.3 km	MPC · JPL
281067 Barmby	2006 KU_{130}	Barmby	May 25, 2006	Mauna Kea	P. A. Wiegert	EUP	6.4 km	MPC · JPL
281068 Chipolin	2006 OK_{1}	Chipolin	July 18, 2006	Lulin	Lin, H.-C., Q. Ye	·	4.9 km	MPC · JPL
281069	2006 OO_{10}	—	July 25, 2006	Ottmarsheim	C. Rinner	·	4.9 km	MPC · JPL
281070	2006 OY_{10}	—	July 21, 2006	Mauna Kea	D. J. Tholen	APO	630 m	MPC · JPL
281071	2006 PM	—	August 6, 2006	Pla D'Arguines	R. Ferrando	·	5.2 km	MPC · JPL
281072	2006 PB_{42}	—	August 14, 2006	Palomar	NEAT	·	3.2 km	MPC · JPL
281073	2006 QK_{100}	—	August 24, 2006	Palomar	NEAT	·	4.2 km	MPC · JPL
281074	2006 QL_{119}	—	August 28, 2006	Socorro	LINEAR	·	2.6 km	MPC · JPL
281075	2006 QE_{120}	—	August 29, 2006	Catalina	CSS	·	2.9 km	MPC · JPL
281076	2006 QV_{122}	—	August 29, 2006	Anderson Mesa	LONEOS	H	780 m	MPC · JPL
281077	2006 QD_{136}	—	August 28, 2006	Goodricke-Pigott	R. A. Tucker	·	1.7 km	MPC · JPL
281078	2006 QF_{141}	—	August 18, 2006	Palomar	NEAT	·	3.4 km	MPC · JPL
281079	2006 RB_{26}	—	September 14, 2006	Kitt Peak	Spacewatch	CYB	4.0 km	MPC · JPL
281080	2006 RR_{61}	—	September 12, 2006	Catalina	CSS	TIR ·	5.1 km	MPC · JPL
281081	2006 RX_{102}	—	September 14, 2006	Palomar	NEAT	·	3.2 km	MPC · JPL
281082	2006 SH_{33}	—	September 17, 2006	Catalina	CSS	CYB	4.8 km	MPC · JPL
281083	2006 SD_{55}	—	September 18, 2006	Catalina	CSS	·	3.5 km	MPC · JPL
281084	2006 SF_{59}	—	September 16, 2006	Catalina	CSS	H	580 m	MPC · JPL
281085	2006 SD_{139}	—	September 21, 2006	Anderson Mesa	LONEOS	H	540 m	MPC · JPL
281086	2006 SN_{220}	—	September 25, 2006	Socorro	LINEAR	·	3.5 km	MPC · JPL
281087	2006 SN_{231}	—	September 26, 2006	Kitt Peak	Spacewatch	EOS	1.9 km	MPC · JPL
281088	2006 SY_{411}	—	September 28, 2006	Catalina	CSS	·	7.1 km	MPC · JPL
281089	2006 SG_{412}	—	September 27, 2006	Mount Lemmon	Mount Lemmon Survey	HOF	2.6 km	MPC · JPL
281090	2006 TY_{73}	—	October 11, 2006	Palomar	NEAT	·	4.3 km	MPC · JPL
281091	2006 TW_{99}	—	October 15, 2006	Kitt Peak	Spacewatch	·	4.5 km	MPC · JPL
281092	2006 TE_{120}	—	October 12, 2006	Apache Point	A. C. Becker	·	3.4 km	MPC · JPL
281093	2006 UR_{109}	—	October 19, 2006	Kitt Peak	Spacewatch	EOS	2.7 km	MPC · JPL
281094	2006 UB_{210}	—	October 23, 2006	Kitt Peak	Spacewatch	·	4.7 km	MPC · JPL
281095	2006 UT_{218}	—	October 16, 2006	Catalina	CSS	ADE	3.0 km	MPC · JPL
281096	2006 UT_{272}	—	October 27, 2006	Kitt Peak	Spacewatch	VER	3.5 km	MPC · JPL
281097	2006 UR_{328}	—	October 19, 2006	Catalina	CSS	·	4.3 km	MPC · JPL
281098	2006 VV_{28}	—	November 10, 2006	Kitt Peak	Spacewatch	DOR	2.5 km	MPC · JPL
281099	2006 VU_{70}	—	November 11, 2006	Kitt Peak	Spacewatch	·	820 m	MPC · JPL
281100	2006 WS_{10}	—	November 16, 2006	Socorro	LINEAR	·	2.9 km	MPC · JPL

== 281101–281200 ==
back to top

Designation			Discovery			Properties		Ref
Permanent	Provisional	Named after	Date	Site	Discoverer(s)	Category	Diam.	Ref
281101	2006 WJ_{17}	—	November 17, 2006	Socorro	LINEAR	PHO	1.1 km	MPC · JPL
281102	2006 WZ_{79}	—	November 18, 2006	Kitt Peak	Spacewatch	·	770 m	MPC · JPL
281103	2006 WT_{82}	—	November 18, 2006	Kitt Peak	Spacewatch	3:2	8.1 km	MPC · JPL
281104	2006 WY_{159}	—	November 22, 2006	Mount Lemmon	Mount Lemmon Survey	·	880 m	MPC · JPL
281105 Dionneross	2006 WT_{198}	Dionneross	November 20, 2006	Catalina	CSS	·	3.4 km	MPC · JPL
281106	2006 XE_{56}	—	December 13, 2006	Mount Lemmon	Mount Lemmon Survey	·	1.2 km	MPC · JPL
281107	2006 XR_{73}	—	December 15, 2006	Catalina	CSS	T_{j} (2.99) · EUP	6.9 km	MPC · JPL
281108	2006 YC_{2}	—	December 17, 2006	7300	W. K. Y. Yeung	·	1.1 km	MPC · JPL
281109	2006 YM_{34}	—	December 21, 2006	Kitt Peak	Spacewatch	·	760 m	MPC · JPL
281110	2007 AW_{1}	—	January 8, 2007	Mount Lemmon	Mount Lemmon Survey	·	840 m	MPC · JPL
281111	2007 AU_{6}	—	January 9, 2007	Kitt Peak	Spacewatch	·	1.5 km	MPC · JPL
281112	2007 AN_{14}	—	January 9, 2007	Mount Lemmon	Mount Lemmon Survey	·	790 m	MPC · JPL
281113	2007 AV_{21}	—	January 15, 2007	Anderson Mesa	LONEOS	·	920 m	MPC · JPL
281114	2007 BX_{10}	—	January 17, 2007	Kitt Peak	Spacewatch	·	820 m	MPC · JPL
281115	2007 BP_{15}	—	January 17, 2007	Kitt Peak	Spacewatch	NYS	1.4 km	MPC · JPL
281116	2007 BM_{20}	—	January 23, 2007	Anderson Mesa	LONEOS	ERI	2.1 km	MPC · JPL
281117	2007 BN_{29}	—	January 24, 2007	Mount Lemmon	Mount Lemmon Survey	·	970 m	MPC · JPL
281118	2007 BF_{46}	—	January 26, 2007	Kitt Peak	Spacewatch	NYS	1.2 km	MPC · JPL
281119	2007 BB_{47}	—	January 26, 2007	Kitt Peak	Spacewatch	PHO	1.0 km	MPC · JPL
281120	2007 BN_{50}	—	January 23, 2007	Socorro	LINEAR	·	1.7 km	MPC · JPL
281121	2007 BJ_{51}	—	January 24, 2007	Kitt Peak	Spacewatch	·	780 m	MPC · JPL
281122	2007 BW_{57}	—	January 24, 2007	Socorro	LINEAR	MAS	1.0 km	MPC · JPL
281123	2007 BP_{67}	—	January 27, 2007	Mount Lemmon	Mount Lemmon Survey	·	1.3 km	MPC · JPL
281124	2007 BH_{70}	—	January 27, 2007	Mount Lemmon	Mount Lemmon Survey	·	2.8 km	MPC · JPL
281125	2007 BK_{70}	—	January 27, 2007	Mount Lemmon	Mount Lemmon Survey	·	1.2 km	MPC · JPL
281126	2007 BJ_{73}	—	January 27, 2007	Mount Lemmon	Mount Lemmon Survey	·	1.0 km	MPC · JPL
281127	2007 BW_{76}	—	January 24, 2007	Mount Lemmon	Mount Lemmon Survey	·	930 m	MPC · JPL
281128	2007 CW_{17}	—	February 8, 2007	Mount Lemmon	Mount Lemmon Survey	·	910 m	MPC · JPL
281129	2007 CP_{23}	—	February 7, 2007	Catalina	CSS	·	1.0 km	MPC · JPL
281130	2007 CY_{34}	—	February 6, 2007	Palomar	NEAT	·	930 m	MPC · JPL
281131	2007 CJ_{38}	—	February 6, 2007	Mount Lemmon	Mount Lemmon Survey	·	850 m	MPC · JPL
281132	2007 CL_{44}	—	February 8, 2007	Palomar	NEAT	·	850 m	MPC · JPL
281133	2007 CX_{45}	—	February 8, 2007	Palomar	NEAT	·	1.1 km	MPC · JPL
281134	2007 CM_{47}	—	February 9, 2007	Kitt Peak	Spacewatch	·	2.8 km	MPC · JPL
281135	2007 CR_{50}	—	February 10, 2007	Catalina	CSS	·	1.1 km	MPC · JPL
281136	2007 CJ_{60}	—	February 10, 2007	Palomar	NEAT	·	1.0 km	MPC · JPL
281137	2007 CH_{66}	—	February 10, 2007	Catalina	CSS	JUN	1.4 km	MPC · JPL
281138	2007 DR_{2}	—	February 16, 2007	Catalina	CSS	·	1.6 km	MPC · JPL
281139	2007 DL_{7}	—	February 19, 2007	Mayhill	Lowe, A.	·	1.6 km	MPC · JPL
281140 Trier	2007 DO_{7}	Trier	February 16, 2007	Taunus	E. Schwab, R. Kling	·	1.3 km	MPC · JPL
281141	2007 DO_{12}	—	February 16, 2007	Mount Lemmon	Mount Lemmon Survey	·	1.7 km	MPC · JPL
281142	2007 DH_{15}	—	February 17, 2007	Kitt Peak	Spacewatch	·	900 m	MPC · JPL
281143	2007 DG_{31}	—	February 17, 2007	Kitt Peak	Spacewatch	·	770 m	MPC · JPL
281144	2007 DS_{37}	—	February 17, 2007	Kitt Peak	Spacewatch	MAS	770 m	MPC · JPL
281145	2007 DF_{41}	—	February 19, 2007	Mount Lemmon	Mount Lemmon Survey	·	1.5 km	MPC · JPL
281146	2007 DT_{42}	—	February 17, 2007	Kitt Peak	Spacewatch	·	1.0 km	MPC · JPL
281147	2007 DA_{43}	—	February 17, 2007	Catalina	CSS	·	1.7 km	MPC · JPL
281148	2007 DX_{56}	—	February 21, 2007	Socorro	LINEAR	ERI	1.8 km	MPC · JPL
281149	2007 DH_{57}	—	February 21, 2007	Mount Lemmon	Mount Lemmon Survey	·	1.3 km	MPC · JPL
281150	2007 DK_{58}	—	February 21, 2007	Kitt Peak	Spacewatch	NYS	1.3 km	MPC · JPL
281151	2007 DY_{65}	—	February 21, 2007	Kitt Peak	Spacewatch	·	1.6 km	MPC · JPL
281152	2007 DM_{74}	—	February 21, 2007	Mount Lemmon	Mount Lemmon Survey	·	850 m	MPC · JPL
281153	2007 DS_{94}	—	February 23, 2007	Kitt Peak	Spacewatch	·	1.2 km	MPC · JPL
281154	2007 DJ_{96}	—	February 23, 2007	Mount Lemmon	Mount Lemmon Survey	MAS	710 m	MPC · JPL
281155	2007 DZ_{96}	—	February 23, 2007	Kitt Peak	Spacewatch	NYS	1.3 km	MPC · JPL
281156	2007 DA_{100}	—	February 25, 2007	Mount Lemmon	Mount Lemmon Survey	MAS	900 m	MPC · JPL
281157	2007 DL_{104}	—	February 27, 2007	Catalina	CSS	·	2.9 km	MPC · JPL
281158	2007 DU_{106}	—	February 23, 2007	Mount Lemmon	Mount Lemmon Survey	·	1.1 km	MPC · JPL
281159	2007 DP_{115}	—	February 21, 2007	Mount Lemmon	Mount Lemmon Survey	·	830 m	MPC · JPL
281160	2007 ER_{3}	—	March 9, 2007	Catalina	CSS	NYS	1.1 km	MPC · JPL
281161	2007 EK_{5}	—	March 9, 2007	Mount Lemmon	Mount Lemmon Survey	·	940 m	MPC · JPL
281162	2007 EO_{14}	—	March 9, 2007	Catalina	CSS	·	2.0 km	MPC · JPL
281163	2007 EO_{16}	—	March 9, 2007	Kitt Peak	Spacewatch	·	1.3 km	MPC · JPL
281164	2007 EZ_{23}	—	March 10, 2007	Mount Lemmon	Mount Lemmon Survey	·	1.6 km	MPC · JPL
281165	2007 EX_{24}	—	March 10, 2007	Palomar	NEAT	·	1.5 km	MPC · JPL
281166	2007 ET_{34}	—	March 10, 2007	Palomar	NEAT	NYS	1.2 km	MPC · JPL
281167	2007 EN_{39}	—	March 12, 2007	Kleť	Kleť	·	2.8 km	MPC · JPL
281168	2007 EA_{44}	—	March 9, 2007	Kitt Peak	Spacewatch	MAS	930 m	MPC · JPL
281169	2007 EP_{45}	—	March 9, 2007	Kitt Peak	Spacewatch	·	1.4 km	MPC · JPL
281170	2007 ET_{45}	—	March 9, 2007	Kitt Peak	Spacewatch	·	1.8 km	MPC · JPL
281171	2007 EB_{48}	—	March 9, 2007	Kitt Peak	Spacewatch	·	2.3 km	MPC · JPL
281172	2007 EM_{48}	—	March 9, 2007	Kitt Peak	Spacewatch	MAS	820 m	MPC · JPL
281173	2007 EP_{48}	—	March 9, 2007	Kitt Peak	Spacewatch	NYS	1.3 km	MPC · JPL
281174	2007 EZ_{68}	—	March 10, 2007	Kitt Peak	Spacewatch	MAS	910 m	MPC · JPL
281175	2007 EU_{71}	—	March 10, 2007	Kitt Peak	Spacewatch	·	2.3 km	MPC · JPL
281176	2007 EM_{72}	—	March 10, 2007	Kitt Peak	Spacewatch	·	1.4 km	MPC · JPL
281177	2007 EG_{73}	—	March 10, 2007	Palomar	NEAT	NYS	1.4 km	MPC · JPL
281178	2007 EG_{76}	—	March 10, 2007	Kitt Peak	Spacewatch	·	1.2 km	MPC · JPL
281179	2007 EB_{79}	—	March 10, 2007	Palomar	NEAT	·	1.8 km	MPC · JPL
281180	2007 EX_{82}	—	March 12, 2007	Kitt Peak	Spacewatch	·	820 m	MPC · JPL
281181	2007 EM_{92}	—	March 10, 2007	Palomar	NEAT	·	3.2 km	MPC · JPL
281182	2007 ER_{105}	—	March 11, 2007	Mount Lemmon	Mount Lemmon Survey	·	980 m	MPC · JPL
281183	2007 EN_{145}	—	March 12, 2007	Mount Lemmon	Mount Lemmon Survey	·	850 m	MPC · JPL
281184	2007 EY_{147}	—	March 12, 2007	Mount Lemmon	Mount Lemmon Survey	·	1.5 km	MPC · JPL
281185	2007 EQ_{151}	—	March 12, 2007	Mount Lemmon	Mount Lemmon Survey	·	1.1 km	MPC · JPL
281186	2007 EP_{166}	—	March 11, 2007	Catalina	CSS	·	2.7 km	MPC · JPL
281187	2007 EZ_{175}	—	March 14, 2007	Kitt Peak	Spacewatch	·	790 m	MPC · JPL
281188	2007 EK_{177}	—	March 14, 2007	Kitt Peak	Spacewatch	·	1.7 km	MPC · JPL
281189	2007 EU_{178}	—	March 14, 2007	Kitt Peak	Spacewatch	GEF	1.4 km	MPC · JPL
281190	2007 EF_{181}	—	March 14, 2007	Kitt Peak	Spacewatch	·	1.2 km	MPC · JPL
281191	2007 EQ_{198}	—	March 15, 2007	Catalina	CSS	·	950 m	MPC · JPL
281192	2007 ES_{210}	—	March 8, 2007	Palomar	NEAT	·	1.0 km	MPC · JPL
281193	2007 EK_{213}	—	March 9, 2007	Mount Lemmon	Mount Lemmon Survey	MAS	740 m	MPC · JPL
281194	2007 EO_{213}	—	March 9, 2007	Kitt Peak	Spacewatch	NYS	1.3 km	MPC · JPL
281195	2007 EM_{214}	—	March 9, 2007	Kitt Peak	Spacewatch	·	1.4 km	MPC · JPL
281196	2007 ED_{219}	—	March 13, 2007	Kitt Peak	Spacewatch	NYS	1.3 km	MPC · JPL
281197	2007 EB_{220}	—	March 13, 2007	Kitt Peak	Spacewatch	V	820 m	MPC · JPL
281198	2007 ET_{223}	—	March 11, 2007	Kitt Peak	Spacewatch	·	1.6 km	MPC · JPL
281199	2007 FD_{18}	—	March 16, 2007	Kitt Peak	Spacewatch	NYS	1.2 km	MPC · JPL
281200	2007 FC_{22}	—	March 20, 2007	Kitt Peak	Spacewatch	MAS	970 m	MPC · JPL

== 281201–281300 ==
back to top

Designation			Discovery			Properties		Ref
Permanent	Provisional	Named after	Date	Site	Discoverer(s)	Category	Diam.	Ref
281201	2007 FW_{45}	—	March 16, 2007	Mount Lemmon	Mount Lemmon Survey	·	1.0 km	MPC · JPL
281202	2007 FE_{47}	—	March 20, 2007	Mount Lemmon	Mount Lemmon Survey	NYS	1.3 km	MPC · JPL
281203	2007 GU_{21}	—	April 11, 2007	Mount Lemmon	Mount Lemmon Survey	·	1.2 km	MPC · JPL
281204	2007 GJ_{31}	—	April 14, 2007	Mount Lemmon	Mount Lemmon Survey	MAS	1.1 km	MPC · JPL
281205	2007 GY_{40}	—	April 14, 2007	Kitt Peak	Spacewatch	·	1.5 km	MPC · JPL
281206	2007 GT_{49}	—	April 15, 2007	Socorro	LINEAR	PHO	1.2 km	MPC · JPL
281207	2007 GE_{50}	—	April 15, 2007	Socorro	LINEAR	H	690 m	MPC · JPL
281208 Žebrauskas	2007 GV_{51}	Žebrauskas	April 15, 2007	Moletai	Molėtai	V	920 m	MPC · JPL
281209	2007 GE_{63}	—	April 15, 2007	Kitt Peak	Spacewatch	·	2.5 km	MPC · JPL
281210	2007 GL_{66}	—	April 15, 2007	Kitt Peak	Spacewatch	·	2.3 km	MPC · JPL
281211	2007 HC_{1}	—	April 16, 2007	Catalina	CSS	EUN	1.5 km	MPC · JPL
281212	2007 HG_{1}	—	April 16, 2007	Catalina	CSS	DOR	3.7 km	MPC · JPL
281213	2007 HT_{7}	—	April 17, 2007	7300	W. K. Y. Yeung	·	2.7 km	MPC · JPL
281214	2007 HX_{11}	—	April 18, 2007	Mount Lemmon	Mount Lemmon Survey	MAS	860 m	MPC · JPL
281215	2007 HB_{19}	—	April 18, 2007	Anderson Mesa	LONEOS	·	1.9 km	MPC · JPL
281216	2007 HH_{22}	—	April 18, 2007	Kitt Peak	Spacewatch	NYS	1.5 km	MPC · JPL
281217	2007 HW_{28}	—	April 19, 2007	Mount Lemmon	Mount Lemmon Survey	EUN	1.3 km	MPC · JPL
281218	2007 HC_{31}	—	April 19, 2007	Mount Lemmon	Mount Lemmon Survey	NYS	1.1 km	MPC · JPL
281219	2007 HK_{33}	—	April 14, 2007	Kitt Peak	Spacewatch	EUN	1.9 km	MPC · JPL
281220	2007 HY_{38}	—	April 20, 2007	Socorro	LINEAR	MAS	1.0 km	MPC · JPL
281221	2007 HQ_{54}	—	April 22, 2007	Kitt Peak	Spacewatch	NYS	1.3 km	MPC · JPL
281222	2007 HO_{58}	—	April 23, 2007	Catalina	CSS	V	1.1 km	MPC · JPL
281223	2007 HV_{66}	—	April 22, 2007	Mount Lemmon	Mount Lemmon Survey	·	2.0 km	MPC · JPL
281224	2007 HM_{75}	—	April 22, 2007	Kitt Peak	Spacewatch	·	1.2 km	MPC · JPL
281225	2007 HA_{86}	—	December 7, 2005	Kitt Peak	Spacewatch	·	1.1 km	MPC · JPL
281226	2007 HF_{89}	—	April 23, 2007	Kitt Peak	Spacewatch	·	2.4 km	MPC · JPL
281227	2007 HL_{91}	—	April 18, 2007	Mount Lemmon	Mount Lemmon Survey	·	1.1 km	MPC · JPL
281228	2007 HZ_{92}	—	April 18, 2007	Kitt Peak	Spacewatch	HOF	4.1 km	MPC · JPL
281229	2007 JF	—	May 7, 2007	Kitt Peak	Spacewatch	·	1.3 km	MPC · JPL
281230	2007 JT_{3}	—	May 6, 2007	Kitt Peak	Spacewatch	·	2.4 km	MPC · JPL
281231	2007 JO_{6}	—	May 9, 2007	Mount Lemmon	Mount Lemmon Survey	·	1.1 km	MPC · JPL
281232	2007 JQ_{21}	—	May 9, 2007	Mount Lemmon	Mount Lemmon Survey	·	1.4 km	MPC · JPL
281233	2007 JK_{31}	—	May 12, 2007	Mount Lemmon	Mount Lemmon Survey	·	1.7 km	MPC · JPL
281234	2007 JZ_{33}	—	May 9, 2007	Mount Lemmon	Mount Lemmon Survey	·	1.6 km	MPC · JPL
281235	2007 JE_{36}	—	May 15, 2007	Wrightwood	J. W. Young	HNS	1.6 km	MPC · JPL
281236	2007 JM_{39}	—	May 15, 2007	Kitt Peak	Spacewatch	·	1.2 km	MPC · JPL
281237	2007 JE_{42}	—	May 15, 2007	La Sagra	OAM	·	4.2 km	MPC · JPL
281238	2007 KQ	—	May 16, 2007	Eskridge	G. Hug	·	1.5 km	MPC · JPL
281239	2007 KD_{5}	—	May 24, 2007	Mount Lemmon	Mount Lemmon Survey	·	1.2 km	MPC · JPL
281240	2007 LG_{4}	—	June 8, 2007	Kitt Peak	Spacewatch	·	1.3 km	MPC · JPL
281241	2007 LM_{5}	—	June 9, 2007	Kitt Peak	Spacewatch	·	3.8 km	MPC · JPL
281242	2007 LU_{10}	—	June 9, 2007	Kitt Peak	Spacewatch	·	1.5 km	MPC · JPL
281243	2007 LA_{22}	—	June 12, 2007	Kitt Peak	Spacewatch	·	1.5 km	MPC · JPL
281244	2007 LU_{27}	—	June 14, 2007	Kitt Peak	Spacewatch	·	2.0 km	MPC · JPL
281245	2007 MG_{3}	—	June 16, 2007	Kitt Peak	Spacewatch	·	1.6 km	MPC · JPL
281246	2007 MU_{3}	—	June 18, 2007	Catalina	CSS	·	3.1 km	MPC · JPL
281247 Egryjózsef	2007 MA_{4}	Egryjózsef	June 19, 2007	Piszkéstető	K. Sárneczky	·	2.2 km	MPC · JPL
281248	2007 ML_{14}	—	June 20, 2007	Kitt Peak	Spacewatch	·	2.5 km	MPC · JPL
281249	2007 MO_{16}	—	June 22, 2007	Anderson Mesa	LONEOS	·	2.9 km	MPC · JPL
281250	2007 MD_{26}	—	June 20, 2007	Siding Spring	SSS	·	2.1 km	MPC · JPL
281251	2007 NT	—	July 9, 2007	Eskridge	G. Hug	·	2.0 km	MPC · JPL
281252	2007 NX_{5}	—	July 10, 2007	Siding Spring	SSS	EUN	2.1 km	MPC · JPL
281253	2007 OV_{6}	—	July 20, 2007	La Sagra	OAM	·	2.0 km	MPC · JPL
281254	2007 PT	—	August 4, 2007	Reedy Creek	J. Broughton	·	1.5 km	MPC · JPL
281255	2007 PW_{3}	—	August 8, 2007	Siding Spring	SSS	·	2.1 km	MPC · JPL
281256	2007 PQ_{17}	—	August 9, 2007	Socorro	LINEAR	·	2.5 km	MPC · JPL
281257	2007 PE_{20}	—	August 9, 2007	Socorro	LINEAR	·	2.3 km	MPC · JPL
281258	2007 PL_{21}	—	August 9, 2007	Socorro	LINEAR	·	3.8 km	MPC · JPL
281259	2007 PW_{21}	—	August 9, 2007	Socorro	LINEAR	·	2.4 km	MPC · JPL
281260	2007 PO_{22}	—	August 11, 2007	Socorro	LINEAR	EOS	3.2 km	MPC · JPL
281261	2007 PW_{22}	—	August 11, 2007	Socorro	LINEAR	·	2.6 km	MPC · JPL
281262	2007 PP_{36}	—	August 13, 2007	Socorro	LINEAR	·	2.3 km	MPC · JPL
281263	2007 PS_{36}	—	August 13, 2007	Socorro	LINEAR	·	1.6 km	MPC · JPL
281264	2007 PT_{37}	—	August 13, 2007	Socorro	LINEAR	AEO	1.6 km	MPC · JPL
281265	2007 QR_{1}	—	August 16, 2007	Purple Mountain	PMO NEO Survey Program	DOR	4.1 km	MPC · JPL
281266	2007 QF_{2}	—	August 20, 2007	Pla D'Arguines	R. Ferrando	·	2.3 km	MPC · JPL
281267	2007 QY_{2}	—	August 19, 2007	La Sagra	OAM	·	2.9 km	MPC · JPL
281268	2007 QT_{12}	—	August 21, 2007	Siding Spring	SSS	·	2.2 km	MPC · JPL
281269	2007 QV_{12}	—	August 23, 2007	Kitt Peak	Spacewatch	·	4.5 km	MPC · JPL
281270	2007 RY_{1}	—	September 2, 2007	Siding Spring	K. Sárneczky, L. Kiss	·	2.7 km	MPC · JPL
281271	2007 RC_{6}	—	September 5, 2007	Dauban	Chante-Perdrix	(32418)	2.2 km	MPC · JPL
281272 Arnaudleroy	2007 RC_{12}	Arnaudleroy	September 10, 2007	Pic du Midi	Pic du Midi	·	2.1 km	MPC · JPL
281273	2007 RK_{13}	—	September 4, 2007	Mount Lemmon	Mount Lemmon Survey	JUN	1.2 km	MPC · JPL
281274	2007 RC_{26}	—	September 4, 2007	Mount Lemmon	Mount Lemmon Survey	·	2.3 km	MPC · JPL
281275	2007 RC_{31}	—	September 5, 2007	Catalina	CSS	·	4.7 km	MPC · JPL
281276	2007 RV_{35}	—	September 8, 2007	Anderson Mesa	LONEOS	·	2.6 km	MPC · JPL
281277	2007 RN_{42}	—	September 9, 2007	Kitt Peak	Spacewatch	EOS	2.7 km	MPC · JPL
281278	2007 RX_{46}	—	September 9, 2007	Kitt Peak	Spacewatch	·	4.1 km	MPC · JPL
281279	2007 RU_{78}	—	September 10, 2007	Mount Lemmon	Mount Lemmon Survey	VER	2.7 km	MPC · JPL
281280	2007 RL_{81}	—	September 10, 2007	Mount Lemmon	Mount Lemmon Survey	·	2.6 km	MPC · JPL
281281	2007 RR_{91}	—	September 10, 2007	Mount Lemmon	Mount Lemmon Survey	·	2.4 km	MPC · JPL
281282	2007 RA_{96}	—	September 10, 2007	Kitt Peak	Spacewatch	·	4.4 km	MPC · JPL
281283	2007 RZ_{103}	—	September 11, 2007	Catalina	CSS	EOS	2.9 km	MPC · JPL
281284	2007 RC_{117}	—	September 11, 2007	Kitt Peak	Spacewatch	EOS	2.2 km	MPC · JPL
281285	2007 RV_{118}	—	September 11, 2007	Mount Lemmon	Mount Lemmon Survey	·	4.5 km	MPC · JPL
281286	2007 RP_{128}	—	September 12, 2007	Mount Lemmon	Mount Lemmon Survey	·	2.8 km	MPC · JPL
281287	2007 RD_{133}	—	September 15, 2007	Vicques	M. Ory	·	1.8 km	MPC · JPL
281288	2007 RF_{136}	—	September 14, 2007	Mount Lemmon	Mount Lemmon Survey	·	3.3 km	MPC · JPL
281289	2007 RV_{142}	—	March 9, 2005	Kitt Peak	Spacewatch	·	3.8 km	MPC · JPL
281290	2007 RM_{144}	—	September 14, 2007	Socorro	LINEAR	·	960 m	MPC · JPL
281291	2007 RQ_{149}	—	September 12, 2007	Catalina	CSS	·	3.6 km	MPC · JPL
281292	2007 RQ_{158}	—	September 12, 2007	Catalina	CSS	·	3.6 km	MPC · JPL
281293	2007 RW_{167}	—	September 10, 2007	Kitt Peak	Spacewatch	·	3.1 km	MPC · JPL
281294	2007 RE_{173}	—	September 10, 2007	Kitt Peak	Spacewatch	·	2.2 km	MPC · JPL
281295	2007 RT_{202}	—	September 13, 2007	Kitt Peak	Spacewatch	·	3.2 km	MPC · JPL
281296	2007 RH_{216}	—	September 13, 2007	Anderson Mesa	LONEOS	·	2.5 km	MPC · JPL
281297	2007 RK_{239}	—	September 14, 2007	Catalina	CSS	EOS	2.9 km	MPC · JPL
281298	2007 RM_{239}	—	September 14, 2007	Catalina	CSS	EOS	2.6 km	MPC · JPL
281299	2007 RS_{258}	—	September 14, 2007	Mount Lemmon	Mount Lemmon Survey	·	2.9 km	MPC · JPL
281300	2007 RS_{284}	—	September 12, 2007	Catalina	CSS	EOS	3.1 km	MPC · JPL

== 281301–281400 ==
back to top

Designation			Discovery			Properties		Ref
Permanent	Provisional	Named after	Date	Site	Discoverer(s)	Category	Diam.	Ref
281301	2007 RX_{291}	—	September 12, 2007	Mount Lemmon	Mount Lemmon Survey	·	5.3 km	MPC · JPL
281302	2007 RA_{299}	—	September 12, 2007	Catalina	CSS	EOS	2.5 km	MPC · JPL
281303	2007 RQ_{310}	—	September 11, 2007	Lulin	LUSS	·	2.3 km	MPC · JPL
281304	2007 RU_{313}	—	September 12, 2007	Catalina	CSS	·	4.7 km	MPC · JPL
281305	2007 RV_{322}	—	September 13, 2007	Mount Lemmon	Mount Lemmon Survey	·	2.3 km	MPC · JPL
281306	2007 SS_{5}	—	September 19, 2007	Socorro	LINEAR	·	2.5 km	MPC · JPL
281307	2007 SO_{9}	—	September 18, 2007	Kitt Peak	Spacewatch	EOS	2.5 km	MPC · JPL
281308	2007 SE_{15}	—	September 23, 2007	Charleston	Astronomical Research Observatory	EOS	2.1 km	MPC · JPL
281309	2007 TC_{3}	—	October 5, 2007	Prairie Grass	Mahony, J.	·	2.8 km	MPC · JPL
281310	2007 TV_{13}	—	October 7, 2007	Socorro	LINEAR	·	3.7 km	MPC · JPL
281311	2007 TZ_{33}	—	October 6, 2007	Kitt Peak	Spacewatch	THM	3.0 km	MPC · JPL
281312	2007 TE_{37}	—	October 4, 2007	Kitt Peak	Spacewatch	·	2.1 km	MPC · JPL
281313	2007 TV_{38}	—	October 6, 2007	Kitt Peak	Spacewatch	(1298)	3.4 km	MPC · JPL
281314	2007 TB_{43}	—	October 7, 2007	Mount Lemmon	Mount Lemmon Survey	·	2.8 km	MPC · JPL
281315	2007 TV_{76}	—	October 5, 2007	Kitt Peak	Spacewatch	VER	3.3 km	MPC · JPL
281316	2007 TH_{92}	—	October 5, 2007	Kitt Peak	Spacewatch	·	2.4 km	MPC · JPL
281317	2007 TO_{103}	—	October 8, 2007	Mount Lemmon	Mount Lemmon Survey	·	3.5 km	MPC · JPL
281318	2007 TQ_{103}	—	October 8, 2007	Mount Lemmon	Mount Lemmon Survey	CYB	4.9 km	MPC · JPL
281319	2007 TW_{145}	—	October 6, 2007	Socorro	LINEAR	VER	4.7 km	MPC · JPL
281320	2007 TB_{146}	—	October 6, 2007	Socorro	LINEAR	·	2.9 km	MPC · JPL
281321	2007 TH_{182}	—	October 8, 2007	Anderson Mesa	LONEOS	·	2.3 km	MPC · JPL
281322	2007 TU_{183}	—	October 9, 2007	Purple Mountain	PMO NEO Survey Program	LIX	6.1 km	MPC · JPL
281323	2007 TX_{183}	—	October 9, 2007	Purple Mountain	PMO NEO Survey Program	(1298)	4.3 km	MPC · JPL
281324	2007 TG_{184}	—	October 10, 2007	Mount Lemmon	Mount Lemmon Survey	·	3.6 km	MPC · JPL
281325	2007 TZ_{186}	—	October 13, 2007	Socorro	LINEAR	·	5.3 km	MPC · JPL
281326	2007 TR_{191}	—	October 4, 2007	Catalina	CSS	EOS	2.6 km	MPC · JPL
281327	2007 TL_{198}	—	October 8, 2007	Kitt Peak	Spacewatch	·	2.7 km	MPC · JPL
281328	2007 TO_{214}	—	October 7, 2007	Catalina	CSS	·	3.9 km	MPC · JPL
281329	2007 TV_{242}	—	October 8, 2007	Catalina	CSS	·	4.2 km	MPC · JPL
281330	2007 TO_{244}	—	October 8, 2007	Catalina	CSS	·	3.0 km	MPC · JPL
281331	2007 TR_{246}	—	October 9, 2007	Mount Lemmon	Mount Lemmon Survey	THM	2.7 km	MPC · JPL
281332	2007 TZ_{311}	—	October 11, 2007	Mount Lemmon	Mount Lemmon Survey	·	2.7 km	MPC · JPL
281333	2007 TT_{329}	—	October 11, 2007	Kitt Peak	Spacewatch	·	3.9 km	MPC · JPL
281334	2007 TD_{336}	—	October 12, 2007	Kitt Peak	Spacewatch	·	1.9 km	MPC · JPL
281335	2007 TF_{340}	—	October 9, 2007	Mount Lemmon	Mount Lemmon Survey	·	3.2 km	MPC · JPL
281336	2007 TM_{350}	—	October 14, 2007	Mount Lemmon	Mount Lemmon Survey	·	3.3 km	MPC · JPL
281337	2007 TN_{391}	—	October 15, 2007	Catalina	CSS	·	2.9 km	MPC · JPL
281338	2007 TJ_{431}	—	October 12, 2007	Kitt Peak	Spacewatch	HYG	3.0 km	MPC · JPL
281339	2007 TX_{433}	—	October 14, 2007	Catalina	CSS	·	4.9 km	MPC · JPL
281340	2007 TP_{441}	—	October 4, 2007	Catalina	CSS	·	4.3 km	MPC · JPL
281341	2007 TY_{441}	—	October 9, 2007	Anderson Mesa	LONEOS	·	2.6 km	MPC · JPL
281342	2007 UP_{2}	—	October 18, 2007	7300	W. K. Y. Yeung	·	3.3 km	MPC · JPL
281343	2007 UK_{21}	—	October 16, 2007	Kitt Peak	Spacewatch	HYG	4.0 km	MPC · JPL
281344	2007 UW_{31}	—	October 19, 2007	Mount Lemmon	Mount Lemmon Survey	·	5.6 km	MPC · JPL
281345	2007 UH_{33}	—	October 16, 2007	Catalina	CSS	MAR	1.5 km	MPC · JPL
281346	2007 UT_{44}	—	October 18, 2007	Mount Lemmon	Mount Lemmon Survey	·	3.8 km	MPC · JPL
281347	2007 UP_{113}	—	October 31, 2007	Kitt Peak	Spacewatch	EUN	1.5 km	MPC · JPL
281348	2007 UY_{135}	—	October 20, 2007	Siding Spring	K. Sárneczky, L. Kiss	·	1.9 km	MPC · JPL
281349	2007 UT_{136}	—	October 20, 2007	Catalina	CSS	·	3.8 km	MPC · JPL
281350	2007 UJ_{140}	—	October 16, 2007	Mount Lemmon	Mount Lemmon Survey	·	1.1 km	MPC · JPL
281351	2007 VT_{10}	—	November 5, 2007	La Sagra	OAM	(32418)	3.3 km	MPC · JPL
281352	2007 VP_{30}	—	November 2, 2007	Kitt Peak	Spacewatch	·	4.0 km	MPC · JPL
281353	2007 VO_{36}	—	November 2, 2007	Mount Lemmon	Mount Lemmon Survey	(1298)	3.4 km	MPC · JPL
281354	2007 VO_{62}	—	November 1, 2007	Kitt Peak	Spacewatch	AEG	3.7 km	MPC · JPL
281355	2007 VB_{147}	—	November 4, 2007	Kitt Peak	Spacewatch	·	2.9 km	MPC · JPL
281356	2007 VH_{167}	—	November 5, 2007	Mount Lemmon	Mount Lemmon Survey	·	4.6 km	MPC · JPL
281357	2007 VF_{176}	—	November 4, 2007	Mount Lemmon	Mount Lemmon Survey	·	6.8 km	MPC · JPL
281358	2007 VJ_{287}	—	November 15, 2007	Catalina	CSS	LIX	4.4 km	MPC · JPL
281359	2007 VN_{301}	—	November 15, 2007	Catalina	CSS	·	2.5 km	MPC · JPL
281360	2007 VE_{322}	—	November 12, 2007	Catalina	CSS	·	6.1 km	MPC · JPL
281361	2007 WQ_{17}	—	November 18, 2007	Mount Lemmon	Mount Lemmon Survey	EUP	4.3 km	MPC · JPL
281362	2007 YE_{34}	—	December 28, 2007	Kitt Peak	Spacewatch	·	3.5 km	MPC · JPL
281363	2008 CV_{5}	—	February 6, 2008	Socorro	LINEAR	H	700 m	MPC · JPL
281364	2008 CH_{9}	—	February 2, 2008	Mount Lemmon	Mount Lemmon Survey	·	4.1 km	MPC · JPL
281365	2008 CM_{116}	—	February 10, 2008	Mount Lemmon	Mount Lemmon Survey	APO +1km	1.1 km	MPC · JPL
281366	2008 CV_{185}	—	February 1, 2008	Catalina	CSS	H	780 m	MPC · JPL
281367	2008 CF_{210}	—	February 1, 2008	Mount Lemmon	Mount Lemmon Survey	·	4.9 km	MPC · JPL
281368	2008 EA	—	March 2, 2008	Catalina	CSS	H	890 m	MPC · JPL
281369	2008 EQ_{25}	—	March 3, 2008	Purple Mountain	PMO NEO Survey Program	·	1 km	MPC · JPL
281370	2008 FD_{58}	—	March 28, 2008	Mount Lemmon	Mount Lemmon Survey	H	570 m	MPC · JPL
281371	2008 FC_{76}	—	March 31, 2008	Mount Lemmon	Mount Lemmon Survey	centaur	58 km	MPC · JPL
281372	2008 GB_{1}	—	April 4, 2008	Catalina	CSS	H	750 m	MPC · JPL
281373	2008 GK_{57}	—	April 5, 2008	Mount Lemmon	Mount Lemmon Survey	·	2.6 km	MPC · JPL
281374	2008 JU_{3}	—	May 1, 2008	Kitt Peak	Spacewatch	V	870 m	MPC · JPL
281375	2008 JV_{19}	—	May 8, 2008	Catalina	CSS	ATE · PHA	240 m	MPC · JPL
281376	2008 JJ_{39}	—	May 15, 2008	Mount Lemmon	Mount Lemmon Survey	·	610 m	MPC · JPL
281377	2008 OR_{3}	—	July 25, 2008	Siding Spring	SSS	·	940 m	MPC · JPL
281378	2008 OE_{8}	—	July 29, 2008	La Sagra	OAM	·	640 m	MPC · JPL
281379	2008 OW_{8}	—	July 30, 2008	Dauban	Kugel, F.	·	820 m	MPC · JPL
281380	2008 OB_{10}	—	July 28, 2008	Dauban	Kugel, F.	·	980 m	MPC · JPL
281381	2008 OL_{10}	—	July 31, 2008	Dauban	Kugel, F.	·	810 m	MPC · JPL
281382	2008 OZ_{10}	—	July 29, 2008	Socorro	LINEAR	·	4.7 km	MPC · JPL
281383	2008 OJ_{19}	—	July 25, 2008	Siding Spring	SSS	·	920 m	MPC · JPL
281384	2008 PE_{6}	—	August 4, 2008	La Sagra	OAM	·	1.3 km	MPC · JPL
281385	2008 PF_{8}	—	August 6, 2008	La Sagra	OAM	·	760 m	MPC · JPL
281386	2008 PT_{9}	—	August 7, 2008	Hibiscus	S. F. Hönig, Teamo, N.	·	960 m	MPC · JPL
281387	2008 PR_{20}	—	August 5, 2008	Siding Spring	SSS	·	3.4 km	MPC · JPL
281388	2008 QZ_{1}	—	August 24, 2008	La Sagra	OAM	·	940 m	MPC · JPL
281389	2008 QA_{6}	—	August 25, 2008	Reedy Creek	J. Broughton	·	820 m	MPC · JPL
281390	2008 QE_{9}	—	August 25, 2008	La Sagra	OAM	·	670 m	MPC · JPL
281391	2008 QW_{17}	—	October 4, 1996	Kitt Peak	Spacewatch	MAR	1.3 km	MPC · JPL
281392	2008 QG_{27}	—	August 30, 2008	La Sagra	OAM	·	1.6 km	MPC · JPL
281393	2008 QK_{31}	—	August 30, 2008	Socorro	LINEAR	·	1.4 km	MPC · JPL
281394	2008 QA_{36}	—	August 21, 2008	Kitt Peak	Spacewatch	·	810 m	MPC · JPL
281395	2008 QD_{46}	—	August 30, 2008	Socorro	LINEAR	·	1.0 km	MPC · JPL
281396	2008 QN_{48}	—	August 25, 2008	Socorro	LINEAR	·	1.7 km	MPC · JPL
281397	2008 RJ_{22}	—	September 3, 2008	La Sagra	OAM	·	1.4 km	MPC · JPL
281398	2008 RM_{25}	—	September 5, 2008	Junk Bond	D. Healy	·	1.2 km	MPC · JPL
281399	2008 RU_{29}	—	September 2, 2008	Kitt Peak	Spacewatch	·	1.6 km	MPC · JPL
281400	2008 RV_{31}	—	September 2, 2008	Kitt Peak	Spacewatch	NYS	1.4 km	MPC · JPL

== 281401–281500 ==
back to top

Designation			Discovery			Properties		Ref
Permanent	Provisional	Named after	Date	Site	Discoverer(s)	Category	Diam.	Ref
281401	2008 RJ_{35}	—	September 2, 2008	Kitt Peak	Spacewatch	MAS	840 m	MPC · JPL
281402	2008 RE_{44}	—	September 2, 2008	Kitt Peak	Spacewatch	NYS	1.2 km	MPC · JPL
281403	2008 RW_{45}	—	September 2, 2008	Kitt Peak	Spacewatch	·	2.6 km	MPC · JPL
281404	2008 RB_{46}	—	September 2, 2008	Kitt Peak	Spacewatch	MAS	730 m	MPC · JPL
281405	2008 RG_{56}	—	September 3, 2008	Kitt Peak	Spacewatch	·	1.0 km	MPC · JPL
281406	2008 RP_{57}	—	September 3, 2008	Kitt Peak	Spacewatch	·	1.5 km	MPC · JPL
281407	2008 RQ_{66}	—	September 4, 2008	Kitt Peak	Spacewatch	·	1.7 km	MPC · JPL
281408	2008 RN_{68}	—	September 4, 2008	Kitt Peak	Spacewatch	V	880 m	MPC · JPL
281409	2008 RF_{71}	—	September 6, 2008	Catalina	CSS	·	970 m	MPC · JPL
281410	2008 RB_{103}	—	September 5, 2008	Kitt Peak	Spacewatch	·	1.4 km	MPC · JPL
281411	2008 RS_{105}	—	September 6, 2008	Catalina	CSS	·	2.5 km	MPC · JPL
281412	2008 RZ_{106}	—	September 7, 2008	Mount Lemmon	Mount Lemmon Survey	·	2.8 km	MPC · JPL
281413	2008 RX_{108}	—	September 2, 2008	Kitt Peak	Spacewatch	HOF	3.0 km	MPC · JPL
281414	2008 RE_{109}	—	September 2, 2008	Kitt Peak	Spacewatch	·	1.4 km	MPC · JPL
281415	2008 RA_{111}	—	September 3, 2008	Kitt Peak	Spacewatch	·	2.0 km	MPC · JPL
281416	2008 RB_{116}	—	September 7, 2008	Mount Lemmon	Mount Lemmon Survey	·	1.5 km	MPC · JPL
281417	2008 RZ_{116}	—	September 7, 2008	Mount Lemmon	Mount Lemmon Survey	AGN	1.3 km	MPC · JPL
281418	2008 RO_{119}	—	September 7, 2008	Catalina	CSS	·	1.4 km	MPC · JPL
281419	2008 RF_{129}	—	September 9, 2008	Kitt Peak	Spacewatch	ADE	2.1 km	MPC · JPL
281420	2008 RH_{129}	—	September 7, 2008	Mount Lemmon	Mount Lemmon Survey	·	1.8 km	MPC · JPL
281421	2008 RR_{130}	—	September 7, 2008	Mount Lemmon	Mount Lemmon Survey	NYS	1.1 km	MPC · JPL
281422	2008 RG_{132}	—	September 9, 2008	Catalina	CSS	·	3.0 km	MPC · JPL
281423	2008 RZ_{138}	—	September 6, 2008	Catalina	CSS	·	3.1 km	MPC · JPL
281424	2008 RG_{139}	—	September 7, 2008	Socorro	LINEAR	MAR	2.7 km	MPC · JPL
281425	2008 RQ_{142}	—	September 7, 2008	Socorro	LINEAR	PHO	1.4 km	MPC · JPL
281426	2008 SX_{2}	—	September 23, 2008	Hibiscus	Teamo, N.	MRX	1.4 km	MPC · JPL
281427	2008 SY_{3}	—	September 22, 2008	Socorro	LINEAR	·	1.8 km	MPC · JPL
281428	2008 SF_{5}	—	September 22, 2008	Socorro	LINEAR	NYS	1.4 km	MPC · JPL
281429	2008 SJ_{5}	—	September 22, 2008	Socorro	LINEAR	·	2.7 km	MPC · JPL
281430	2008 SO_{8}	—	September 22, 2008	Socorro	LINEAR	(2076)	900 m	MPC · JPL
281431	2008 SG_{9}	—	September 22, 2008	Socorro	LINEAR	·	760 m	MPC · JPL
281432	2008 SK_{9}	—	September 22, 2008	Socorro	LINEAR	·	1.3 km	MPC · JPL
281433	2008 SB_{10}	—	September 22, 2008	Socorro	LINEAR	·	2.9 km	MPC · JPL
281434	2008 SZ_{40}	—	September 20, 2008	Catalina	CSS	MAS	960 m	MPC · JPL
281435	2008 ST_{42}	—	September 20, 2008	Kitt Peak	Spacewatch	·	2.9 km	MPC · JPL
281436	2008 SN_{60}	—	September 20, 2008	Catalina	CSS	·	1.6 km	MPC · JPL
281437	2008 SR_{60}	—	September 20, 2008	Catalina	CSS	·	1.4 km	MPC · JPL
281438	2008 SE_{65}	—	September 21, 2008	Kitt Peak	Spacewatch	·	1.7 km	MPC · JPL
281439	2008 ST_{70}	—	September 22, 2008	Mount Lemmon	Mount Lemmon Survey	·	2.1 km	MPC · JPL
281440	2008 SV_{71}	—	September 22, 2008	Goodricke-Pigott	R. A. Tucker	·	1.5 km	MPC · JPL
281441	2008 SW_{72}	—	September 22, 2008	Mount Lemmon	Mount Lemmon Survey	·	2.8 km	MPC · JPL
281442	2008 SX_{77}	—	September 23, 2008	Mount Lemmon	Mount Lemmon Survey	MRX	1.3 km	MPC · JPL
281443	2008 SO_{81}	—	September 23, 2008	Catalina	CSS	EUN	2.4 km	MPC · JPL
281444	2008 SR_{83}	—	September 27, 2008	Altschwendt	W. Ries	·	1.0 km	MPC · JPL
281445 Scotthowe	2008 SS_{84}	Scotthowe	September 28, 2008	Wrightwood	J. W. Young	WIT	980 m	MPC · JPL
281446	2008 SL_{93}	—	September 21, 2008	Kitt Peak	Spacewatch	·	1.8 km	MPC · JPL
281447	2008 SJ_{97}	—	September 21, 2008	Kitt Peak	Spacewatch	AGN	1.7 km	MPC · JPL
281448	2008 SQ_{99}	—	September 21, 2008	Kitt Peak	Spacewatch	·	1.5 km	MPC · JPL
281449	2008 SR_{100}	—	September 21, 2008	Kitt Peak	Spacewatch	·	2.0 km	MPC · JPL
281450	2008 SS_{105}	—	September 21, 2008	Kitt Peak	Spacewatch	·	1.7 km	MPC · JPL
281451	2008 SF_{106}	—	September 21, 2008	Kitt Peak	Spacewatch	(5)	1.4 km	MPC · JPL
281452	2008 SS_{106}	—	September 21, 2008	Catalina	CSS	·	1.4 km	MPC · JPL
281453	2008 SC_{110}	—	September 22, 2008	Kitt Peak	Spacewatch	MAS	790 m	MPC · JPL
281454	2008 SV_{120}	—	September 22, 2008	Mount Lemmon	Mount Lemmon Survey	NYS	990 m	MPC · JPL
281455	2008 SO_{124}	—	September 22, 2008	Mount Lemmon	Mount Lemmon Survey	·	1.9 km	MPC · JPL
281456	2008 SZ_{126}	—	September 22, 2008	Kitt Peak	Spacewatch	MAS	780 m	MPC · JPL
281457	2008 SS_{131}	—	September 22, 2008	Kitt Peak	Spacewatch	·	2.4 km	MPC · JPL
281458	2008 SU_{131}	—	September 22, 2008	Kitt Peak	Spacewatch	·	1.8 km	MPC · JPL
281459 Kyrylenko	2008 SU_{148}	Kyrylenko	September 27, 2008	Andrushivka	Andrushivka	·	720 m	MPC · JPL
281460	2008 SH_{155}	—	September 23, 2008	Socorro	LINEAR	MAS	790 m	MPC · JPL
281461	2008 SJ_{164}	—	September 28, 2008	Socorro	LINEAR	MAS	840 m	MPC · JPL
281462	2008 SQ_{166}	—	September 28, 2008	Socorro	LINEAR	·	2.5 km	MPC · JPL
281463	2008 SR_{166}	—	September 28, 2008	Socorro	LINEAR	·	3.6 km	MPC · JPL
281464	2008 ST_{167}	—	September 28, 2008	Socorro	LINEAR	·	1.6 km	MPC · JPL
281465	2008 SF_{177}	—	September 23, 2008	Mount Lemmon	Mount Lemmon Survey	·	1.3 km	MPC · JPL
281466	2008 SR_{182}	—	September 24, 2008	Mount Lemmon	Mount Lemmon Survey	·	1.6 km	MPC · JPL
281467	2008 SL_{184}	—	September 24, 2008	Mount Lemmon	Mount Lemmon Survey	·	1.7 km	MPC · JPL
281468	2008 SE_{187}	—	September 25, 2008	Kitt Peak	Spacewatch	·	2.1 km	MPC · JPL
281469	2008 SZ_{190}	—	September 25, 2008	Mount Lemmon	Mount Lemmon Survey	·	1.5 km	MPC · JPL
281470	2008 SO_{191}	—	September 25, 2008	Mount Lemmon	Mount Lemmon Survey	·	1.1 km	MPC · JPL
281471	2008 SM_{197}	—	September 25, 2008	Kitt Peak	Spacewatch	·	1.8 km	MPC · JPL
281472	2008 SO_{201}	—	September 26, 2008	Kitt Peak	Spacewatch	·	2.1 km	MPC · JPL
281473	2008 SF_{202}	—	September 26, 2008	Kitt Peak	Spacewatch	MRX	1.1 km	MPC · JPL
281474	2008 SD_{203}	—	September 26, 2008	Kitt Peak	Spacewatch	·	1.4 km	MPC · JPL
281475	2008 SY_{203}	—	September 26, 2008	Kitt Peak	Spacewatch	·	1.2 km	MPC · JPL
281476	2008 SZ_{219}	—	September 30, 2008	La Sagra	OAM	NYS	1.0 km	MPC · JPL
281477	2008 SX_{223}	—	September 25, 2008	Kitt Peak	Spacewatch	WIT	1.1 km	MPC · JPL
281478	2008 SM_{226}	—	September 27, 2008	Mount Lemmon	Mount Lemmon Survey	·	3.2 km	MPC · JPL
281479	2008 SS_{232}	—	September 4, 2008	Kitt Peak	Spacewatch	·	2.8 km	MPC · JPL
281480	2008 SS_{236}	—	September 29, 2008	Catalina	CSS	·	920 m	MPC · JPL
281481	2008 SS_{239}	—	September 29, 2008	Kitt Peak	Spacewatch	·	2.5 km	MPC · JPL
281482	2008 SS_{240}	—	September 29, 2008	Kitt Peak	Spacewatch	·	3.1 km	MPC · JPL
281483	2008 SG_{241}	—	September 29, 2008	Catalina	CSS	·	1.6 km	MPC · JPL
281484	2008 SD_{251}	—	September 24, 2008	Kitt Peak	Spacewatch	MAS	750 m	MPC · JPL
281485	2008 SS_{263}	—	September 24, 2008	Catalina	CSS	·	1.8 km	MPC · JPL
281486	2008 SW_{263}	—	September 24, 2008	Kitt Peak	Spacewatch	·	1.6 km	MPC · JPL
281487	2008 SD_{267}	—	September 22, 2008	Mount Lemmon	Mount Lemmon Survey	·	2.9 km	MPC · JPL
281488	2008 SW_{267}	—	September 23, 2008	Kitt Peak	Spacewatch	·	2.1 km	MPC · JPL
281489	2008 SZ_{267}	—	September 23, 2008	Mount Lemmon	Mount Lemmon Survey	·	1.8 km	MPC · JPL
281490	2008 SR_{268}	—	September 29, 2008	Catalina	CSS	·	3.5 km	MPC · JPL
281491	2008 ST_{274}	—	September 21, 2008	Kitt Peak	Spacewatch	AGN	1.5 km	MPC · JPL
281492	2008 SO_{275}	—	September 23, 2008	Kitt Peak	Spacewatch	·	2.0 km	MPC · JPL
281493	2008 ST_{277}	—	September 25, 2008	Kitt Peak	Spacewatch	·	1.1 km	MPC · JPL
281494	2008 SF_{281}	—	September 29, 2008	Mount Lemmon	Mount Lemmon Survey	·	4.5 km	MPC · JPL
281495	2008 SD_{282}	—	September 27, 2008	Mount Lemmon	Mount Lemmon Survey	KOR	1.7 km	MPC · JPL
281496	2008 ST_{285}	—	September 21, 2008	Kitt Peak	Spacewatch	·	2.3 km	MPC · JPL
281497	2008 SM_{287}	—	September 23, 2008	Mount Lemmon	Mount Lemmon Survey	·	1.5 km	MPC · JPL
281498	2008 SO_{287}	—	September 23, 2008	Kitt Peak	Spacewatch	·	2.3 km	MPC · JPL
281499	2008 SH_{290}	—	September 29, 2008	Kitt Peak	Spacewatch	·	1.8 km	MPC · JPL
281500	2008 SF_{291}	—	September 20, 2008	Catalina	CSS	·	1.3 km	MPC · JPL

== 281501–281600 ==
back to top

Designation			Discovery			Properties		Ref
Permanent	Provisional	Named after	Date	Site	Discoverer(s)	Category	Diam.	Ref
281501	2008 SV_{298}	—	September 22, 2008	Kitt Peak	Spacewatch	·	2.5 km	MPC · JPL
281502	2008 SB_{299}	—	September 22, 2008	Socorro	LINEAR	V	870 m	MPC · JPL
281503	2008 SV_{301}	—	September 23, 2008	Kitt Peak	Spacewatch	·	3.3 km	MPC · JPL
281504	2008 SZ_{302}	—	September 24, 2008	Catalina	CSS	·	1.7 km	MPC · JPL
281505	2008 SZ_{306}	—	September 29, 2008	Socorro	LINEAR	WIT	1.4 km	MPC · JPL
281506	2008 SZ_{307}	—	September 29, 2008	Kitt Peak	Spacewatch	·	1.0 km	MPC · JPL
281507 Johnellen	2008 TM_{9}	Johnellen	October 7, 2008	Celbridge	McDonald, D.	·	2.4 km	MPC · JPL
281508	2008 TA_{10}	—	October 7, 2008	Tiki	Teamo, N.	·	2.5 km	MPC · JPL
281509	2008 TB_{19}	—	October 1, 2008	Mount Lemmon	Mount Lemmon Survey	KOR	1.5 km	MPC · JPL
281510	2008 TT_{22}	—	October 1, 2008	Kitt Peak	Spacewatch	·	3.2 km	MPC · JPL
281511	2008 TX_{36}	—	October 1, 2008	Catalina	CSS	(2076)	990 m	MPC · JPL
281512	2008 TZ_{36}	—	October 1, 2008	Catalina	CSS	·	3.5 km	MPC · JPL
281513	2008 TD_{38}	—	October 1, 2008	Mount Lemmon	Mount Lemmon Survey	·	1.4 km	MPC · JPL
281514	2008 TS_{38}	—	October 1, 2008	Kitt Peak	Spacewatch	(5)	1.5 km	MPC · JPL
281515	2008 TB_{39}	—	October 1, 2008	Kitt Peak	Spacewatch	·	2.5 km	MPC · JPL
281516	2008 TE_{48}	—	October 1, 2008	Kitt Peak	Spacewatch	·	2.4 km	MPC · JPL
281517	2008 TN_{54}	—	October 2, 2008	Kitt Peak	Spacewatch	WIT	1.2 km	MPC · JPL
281518	2008 TS_{55}	—	October 2, 2008	Kitt Peak	Spacewatch	·	1.9 km	MPC · JPL
281519	2008 TY_{65}	—	October 2, 2008	Catalina	CSS	V	810 m	MPC · JPL
281520	2008 TG_{66}	—	October 2, 2008	Kitt Peak	Spacewatch	·	2.8 km	MPC · JPL
281521	2008 TP_{69}	—	October 2, 2008	Kitt Peak	Spacewatch	·	1.4 km	MPC · JPL
281522	2008 TJ_{75}	—	October 2, 2008	Kitt Peak	Spacewatch	·	2.6 km	MPC · JPL
281523	2008 TQ_{82}	—	October 3, 2008	La Sagra	OAM	·	2.4 km	MPC · JPL
281524	2008 TW_{98}	—	October 6, 2008	Kitt Peak	Spacewatch	·	1.1 km	MPC · JPL
281525	2008 TR_{102}	—	October 6, 2008	Kitt Peak	Spacewatch	·	1.1 km	MPC · JPL
281526	2008 TY_{104}	—	October 6, 2008	Kitt Peak	Spacewatch	·	2.6 km	MPC · JPL
281527	2008 TM_{106}	—	October 6, 2008	Kitt Peak	Spacewatch	THM	3.3 km	MPC · JPL
281528	2008 TR_{111}	—	October 6, 2008	Catalina	CSS	EUN	2.0 km	MPC · JPL
281529	2008 TM_{113}	—	October 6, 2008	Kitt Peak	Spacewatch	·	2.7 km	MPC · JPL
281530	2008 TX_{122}	—	October 7, 2008	Kitt Peak	Spacewatch	AGN	1.6 km	MPC · JPL
281531	2008 TF_{138}	—	October 8, 2008	Mount Lemmon	Mount Lemmon Survey	·	1.9 km	MPC · JPL
281532	2008 TL_{146}	—	October 9, 2008	Mount Lemmon	Mount Lemmon Survey	MAS	710 m	MPC · JPL
281533	2008 TD_{160}	—	October 1, 2008	Kitt Peak	Spacewatch	THM	2.4 km	MPC · JPL
281534	2008 TO_{160}	—	October 1, 2008	Kitt Peak	Spacewatch	·	3.3 km	MPC · JPL
281535	2008 TD_{171}	—	October 10, 2008	Kitt Peak	Spacewatch	·	2.0 km	MPC · JPL
281536	2008 TY_{174}	—	October 8, 2008	Kitt Peak	Spacewatch	·	1.6 km	MPC · JPL
281537	2008 TS_{177}	—	October 4, 2008	La Sagra	OAM	·	2.3 km	MPC · JPL
281538	2008 TN_{182}	—	October 1, 2008	Kitt Peak	Spacewatch	AGN	1.6 km	MPC · JPL
281539	2008 TY_{182}	—	October 2, 2008	Kitt Peak	Spacewatch	·	2.7 km	MPC · JPL
281540	2008 TS_{188}	—	October 10, 2008	Kitt Peak	Spacewatch	·	1.6 km	MPC · JPL
281541	2008 UC_{6}	—	October 20, 2008	Kitt Peak	Spacewatch	·	1.3 km	MPC · JPL
281542	2008 UL_{19}	—	October 19, 2008	Kitt Peak	Spacewatch	·	1.3 km	MPC · JPL
281543	2008 UE_{27}	—	October 20, 2008	Kitt Peak	Spacewatch	·	1.5 km	MPC · JPL
281544	2008 UX_{27}	—	October 20, 2008	Kitt Peak	Spacewatch	·	2.2 km	MPC · JPL
281545	2008 UZ_{30}	—	October 20, 2008	Kitt Peak	Spacewatch	KOR	1.3 km	MPC · JPL
281546	2008 UD_{31}	—	October 20, 2008	Kitt Peak	Spacewatch	·	2.7 km	MPC · JPL
281547	2008 UK_{31}	—	October 20, 2008	Kitt Peak	Spacewatch	HOF	3.3 km	MPC · JPL
281548	2008 UX_{32}	—	October 20, 2008	Kitt Peak	Spacewatch	·	2.2 km	MPC · JPL
281549	2008 UD_{38}	—	October 20, 2008	Kitt Peak	Spacewatch	·	2.2 km	MPC · JPL
281550	2008 UX_{39}	—	October 20, 2008	Kitt Peak	Spacewatch	·	2.6 km	MPC · JPL
281551	2008 UQ_{48}	—	October 20, 2008	Kitt Peak	Spacewatch	·	1.7 km	MPC · JPL
281552	2008 UF_{49}	—	October 20, 2008	Kitt Peak	Spacewatch	·	2.2 km	MPC · JPL
281553	2008 UG_{52}	—	October 20, 2008	Mount Lemmon	Mount Lemmon Survey	·	2.0 km	MPC · JPL
281554	2008 UT_{54}	—	October 20, 2008	Mount Lemmon	Mount Lemmon Survey	(16286)	2.9 km	MPC · JPL
281555	2008 UU_{59}	—	October 21, 2008	Kitt Peak	Spacewatch	·	1.4 km	MPC · JPL
281556	2008 UL_{71}	—	October 21, 2008	Mount Lemmon	Mount Lemmon Survey	·	2.4 km	MPC · JPL
281557	2008 UV_{73}	—	October 21, 2008	Kitt Peak	Spacewatch	·	4.8 km	MPC · JPL
281558	2008 UC_{74}	—	October 21, 2008	Kitt Peak	Spacewatch	·	4.2 km	MPC · JPL
281559	2008 UF_{75}	—	October 21, 2008	Kitt Peak	Spacewatch	·	3.8 km	MPC · JPL
281560	2008 UU_{75}	—	October 21, 2008	Kitt Peak	Spacewatch	·	2.5 km	MPC · JPL
281561 Taitung	2008 UL_{78}	Taitung	October 21, 2008	Lulin	Hsiao, X. Y., Q. Ye	·	2.3 km	MPC · JPL
281562	2008 UT_{85}	—	October 23, 2008	Mount Lemmon	Mount Lemmon Survey	·	2.6 km	MPC · JPL
281563	2008 UC_{87}	—	October 23, 2008	Mount Lemmon	Mount Lemmon Survey	·	2.1 km	MPC · JPL
281564 Fuhsiehhai	2008 UQ_{87}	Fuhsiehhai	October 23, 2008	Lulin	Hsiao, H.-Y., Q. Ye	·	3.0 km	MPC · JPL
281565	2008 UA_{89}	—	October 24, 2008	Mount Lemmon	Mount Lemmon Survey	NEM	2.6 km	MPC · JPL
281566	2008 UQ_{92}	—	October 24, 2008	Socorro	LINEAR	·	3.6 km	MPC · JPL
281567	2008 UR_{92}	—	October 24, 2008	Socorro	LINEAR	GEF	1.6 km	MPC · JPL
281568	2008 UF_{93}	—	October 24, 2008	Socorro	LINEAR	·	5.6 km	MPC · JPL
281569 Taea	2008 UV_{94}	Taea	October 23, 2008	Lulin	Hsiao, X. Y., Q. Ye	·	1.1 km	MPC · JPL
281570	2008 UH_{97}	—	October 25, 2008	Socorro	LINEAR	·	2.6 km	MPC · JPL
281571	2008 UM_{98}	—	October 26, 2008	Socorro	LINEAR	·	2.5 km	MPC · JPL
281572	2008 UJ_{100}	—	October 27, 2008	Bisei SG Center	BATTeRS	·	2.3 km	MPC · JPL
281573	2008 UQ_{101}	—	October 20, 2008	Kitt Peak	Spacewatch	·	1.3 km	MPC · JPL
281574	2008 UJ_{108}	—	October 21, 2008	Kitt Peak	Spacewatch	·	5.0 km	MPC · JPL
281575	2008 UV_{110}	—	October 22, 2008	Kitt Peak	Spacewatch	·	2.4 km	MPC · JPL
281576	2008 UZ_{116}	—	October 22, 2008	Kitt Peak	Spacewatch	TEL	1.9 km	MPC · JPL
281577	2008 UL_{117}	—	October 22, 2008	Kitt Peak	Spacewatch	·	2.4 km	MPC · JPL
281578	2008 UM_{127}	—	October 22, 2008	Kitt Peak	Spacewatch	·	3.4 km	MPC · JPL
281579	2008 UN_{130}	—	October 23, 2008	Kitt Peak	Spacewatch	·	1.8 km	MPC · JPL
281580	2008 UO_{132}	—	October 23, 2008	Kitt Peak	Spacewatch	·	3.9 km	MPC · JPL
281581	2008 UT_{132}	—	October 23, 2008	Kitt Peak	Spacewatch	(7605)	6.6 km	MPC · JPL
281582	2008 UY_{136}	—	October 23, 2008	Kitt Peak	Spacewatch	·	3.3 km	MPC · JPL
281583	2008 UL_{139}	—	October 23, 2008	Kitt Peak	Spacewatch	EOS	2.0 km	MPC · JPL
281584	2008 UD_{141}	—	October 23, 2008	Kitt Peak	Spacewatch	·	2.3 km	MPC · JPL
281585	2008 UU_{141}	—	October 23, 2008	Kitt Peak	Spacewatch	·	2.4 km	MPC · JPL
281586	2008 UK_{143}	—	October 23, 2008	Kitt Peak	Spacewatch	·	1.3 km	MPC · JPL
281587	2008 UM_{143}	—	October 23, 2008	Kitt Peak	Spacewatch	·	2.6 km	MPC · JPL
281588	2008 UB_{145}	—	October 23, 2008	Kitt Peak	Spacewatch	·	2.3 km	MPC · JPL
281589	2008 UH_{145}	—	October 23, 2008	Kitt Peak	Spacewatch	KOR	1.5 km	MPC · JPL
281590	2008 UN_{148}	—	October 23, 2008	Kitt Peak	Spacewatch	·	2.8 km	MPC · JPL
281591	2008 UE_{149}	—	October 23, 2008	Kitt Peak	Spacewatch	EOS	2.2 km	MPC · JPL
281592	2008 UL_{151}	—	October 23, 2008	Kitt Peak	Spacewatch	·	3.3 km	MPC · JPL
281593	2008 UJ_{156}	—	October 23, 2008	Kitt Peak	Spacewatch	·	2.0 km	MPC · JPL
281594	2008 UG_{157}	—	October 23, 2008	Mount Lemmon	Mount Lemmon Survey	·	2.2 km	MPC · JPL
281595	2008 UV_{157}	—	October 23, 2008	Mount Lemmon	Mount Lemmon Survey	·	2.4 km	MPC · JPL
281596	2008 UP_{161}	—	October 24, 2008	Kitt Peak	Spacewatch	·	3.0 km	MPC · JPL
281597	2008 UF_{167}	—	October 24, 2008	Kitt Peak	Spacewatch	·	1.8 km	MPC · JPL
281598	2008 UP_{167}	—	October 24, 2008	Kitt Peak	Spacewatch	·	1.1 km	MPC · JPL
281599	2008 UH_{175}	—	October 24, 2008	Mount Lemmon	Mount Lemmon Survey	·	2.6 km	MPC · JPL
281600	2008 UO_{180}	—	October 24, 2008	Kitt Peak	Spacewatch	·	1.4 km	MPC · JPL

== 281601–281700 ==
back to top

Designation			Discovery			Properties		Ref
Permanent	Provisional	Named after	Date	Site	Discoverer(s)	Category	Diam.	Ref
281601	2008 UK_{181}	—	October 24, 2008	Mount Lemmon	Mount Lemmon Survey	·	5.0 km	MPC · JPL
281602	2008 US_{184}	—	October 24, 2008	Kitt Peak	Spacewatch	KOR	1.7 km	MPC · JPL
281603	2008 UP_{187}	—	October 24, 2008	Kitt Peak	Spacewatch	·	3.6 km	MPC · JPL
281604	2008 UE_{188}	—	October 24, 2008	Kitt Peak	Spacewatch	·	1.6 km	MPC · JPL
281605	2008 UK_{198}	—	October 26, 2008	Socorro	LINEAR	MAR	3.3 km	MPC · JPL
281606	2008 UQ_{200}	—	October 27, 2008	Socorro	LINEAR	·	2.6 km	MPC · JPL
281607	2008 UU_{201}	—	October 28, 2008	Socorro	LINEAR	·	1.8 km	MPC · JPL
281608	2008 UJ_{203}	—	October 28, 2008	Socorro	LINEAR	·	2.4 km	MPC · JPL
281609	2008 UK_{203}	—	October 28, 2008	Socorro	LINEAR	·	2.2 km	MPC · JPL
281610	2008 UV_{208}	—	October 23, 2008	Kitt Peak	Spacewatch	RAF	1.1 km	MPC · JPL
281611	2008 UQ_{210}	—	October 23, 2008	Kitt Peak	Spacewatch	HOF	2.4 km	MPC · JPL
281612	2008 UQ_{211}	—	October 23, 2008	Mount Lemmon	Mount Lemmon Survey	·	2.4 km	MPC · JPL
281613	2008 UV_{214}	—	October 24, 2008	Catalina	CSS	(1547)	2.6 km	MPC · JPL
281614	2008 UE_{215}	—	October 24, 2008	Catalina	CSS	·	2.1 km	MPC · JPL
281615	2008 UC_{221}	—	October 25, 2008	Kitt Peak	Spacewatch	·	3.9 km	MPC · JPL
281616	2008 UW_{223}	—	October 25, 2008	Catalina	CSS	·	2.5 km	MPC · JPL
281617	2008 UY_{237}	—	October 26, 2008	Kitt Peak	Spacewatch	·	2.4 km	MPC · JPL
281618	2008 UJ_{239}	—	October 26, 2008	Kitt Peak	Spacewatch	EOS	3.0 km	MPC · JPL
281619	2008 UN_{250}	—	October 27, 2008	Kitt Peak	Spacewatch	KOR	1.7 km	MPC · JPL
281620	2008 UY_{256}	—	October 27, 2008	Kitt Peak	Spacewatch	·	2.0 km	MPC · JPL
281621	2008 UB_{263}	—	October 27, 2008	Kitt Peak	Spacewatch	EOS	2.3 km	MPC · JPL
281622	2008 UQ_{266}	—	October 28, 2008	Kitt Peak	Spacewatch	HOF	3.7 km	MPC · JPL
281623	2008 UF_{269}	—	October 28, 2008	Kitt Peak	Spacewatch	·	2.7 km	MPC · JPL
281624	2008 UG_{274}	—	October 28, 2008	Kitt Peak	Spacewatch	(5)	1.5 km	MPC · JPL
281625	2008 UE_{282}	—	October 28, 2008	Kitt Peak	Spacewatch	·	2.7 km	MPC · JPL
281626	2008 UT_{283}	—	October 28, 2008	Mount Lemmon	Mount Lemmon Survey	·	2.2 km	MPC · JPL
281627	2008 UY_{284}	—	October 28, 2008	Mount Lemmon	Mount Lemmon Survey	·	2.1 km	MPC · JPL
281628	2008 UE_{286}	—	October 28, 2008	Mount Lemmon	Mount Lemmon Survey	·	2.2 km	MPC · JPL
281629	2008 UG_{291}	—	October 29, 2008	Kitt Peak	Spacewatch	·	2.3 km	MPC · JPL
281630	2008 UM_{297}	—	October 29, 2008	Kitt Peak	Spacewatch	·	1.9 km	MPC · JPL
281631	2008 UL_{303}	—	October 29, 2008	Kitt Peak	Spacewatch	·	2.5 km	MPC · JPL
281632	2008 UL_{304}	—	October 29, 2008	Mount Lemmon	Mount Lemmon Survey	·	1.3 km	MPC · JPL
281633	2008 UO_{307}	—	October 30, 2008	Catalina	CSS	·	2.1 km	MPC · JPL
281634	2008 UU_{310}	—	October 30, 2008	Kitt Peak	Spacewatch	·	1.7 km	MPC · JPL
281635	2008 UT_{312}	—	October 30, 2008	Kitt Peak	Spacewatch	·	2.2 km	MPC · JPL
281636	2008 UR_{315}	—	October 30, 2008	Kitt Peak	Spacewatch	·	1.8 km	MPC · JPL
281637	2008 UN_{316}	—	October 30, 2008	Kitt Peak	Spacewatch	·	1.7 km	MPC · JPL
281638	2008 UR_{316}	—	October 30, 2008	Kitt Peak	Spacewatch	·	1.4 km	MPC · JPL
281639	2008 UT_{330}	—	October 31, 2008	Kachina	Hobart, J.	·	1.6 km	MPC · JPL
281640	2008 UV_{334}	—	October 20, 2008	Kitt Peak	Spacewatch	NYS	1.1 km	MPC · JPL
281641	2008 UD_{335}	—	October 21, 2008	Kitt Peak	Spacewatch	·	3.1 km	MPC · JPL
281642	2008 UT_{335}	—	October 20, 2008	Kitt Peak	Spacewatch	·	3.0 km	MPC · JPL
281643	2008 UX_{336}	—	October 20, 2008	Kitt Peak	Spacewatch	·	3.4 km	MPC · JPL
281644	2008 UV_{337}	—	October 20, 2008	Kitt Peak	Spacewatch	·	1.2 km	MPC · JPL
281645	2008 UY_{337}	—	October 20, 2008	Kitt Peak	Spacewatch	·	2.6 km	MPC · JPL
281646	2008 UA_{338}	—	October 20, 2008	Kitt Peak	Spacewatch	GEF	1.6 km	MPC · JPL
281647	2008 UB_{339}	—	October 22, 2008	Mount Lemmon	Mount Lemmon Survey	·	2.4 km	MPC · JPL
281648	2008 UK_{340}	—	October 23, 2008	Kitt Peak	Spacewatch	HOF	3.1 km	MPC · JPL
281649	2008 UF_{342}	—	October 28, 2008	Mount Lemmon	Mount Lemmon Survey	·	2.1 km	MPC · JPL
281650	2008 UP_{343}	—	October 20, 2008	Mount Lemmon	Mount Lemmon Survey	HOF	2.5 km	MPC · JPL
281651	2008 UO_{344}	—	October 30, 2008	Kitt Peak	Spacewatch	NEM	2.9 km	MPC · JPL
281652	2008 UX_{347}	—	October 23, 2008	Kitt Peak	Spacewatch	·	4.3 km	MPC · JPL
281653	2008 US_{350}	—	October 27, 2008	Kitt Peak	Spacewatch	EOS	2.0 km	MPC · JPL
281654	2008 UJ_{353}	—	October 23, 2008	Kitt Peak	Spacewatch	·	4.3 km	MPC · JPL
281655	2008 UM_{353}	—	October 28, 2008	Kitt Peak	Spacewatch	KOR	1.3 km	MPC · JPL
281656	2008 UG_{354}	—	October 23, 2008	Mount Lemmon	Mount Lemmon Survey	·	1.7 km	MPC · JPL
281657	2008 UG_{359}	—	October 27, 2008	Mount Lemmon	Mount Lemmon Survey	·	3.8 km	MPC · JPL
281658	2008 UZ_{361}	—	October 24, 2008	Catalina	CSS	·	3.5 km	MPC · JPL
281659	2008 VZ_{10}	—	November 2, 2008	Mount Lemmon	Mount Lemmon Survey	·	2.4 km	MPC · JPL
281660	2008 VQ_{13}	—	November 5, 2008	Ondřejov	Ondrejov	·	1.8 km	MPC · JPL
281661 Michaelsiems	2008 VW_{13}	Michaelsiems	November 8, 2008	Tzec Maun	E. Schwab	·	1.5 km	MPC · JPL
281662	2008 VX_{15}	—	November 1, 2008	Kitt Peak	Spacewatch	AGN	1.5 km	MPC · JPL
281663	2008 VY_{17}	—	November 1, 2008	Kitt Peak	Spacewatch	·	1.6 km	MPC · JPL
281664	2008 VR_{22}	—	November 1, 2008	Mount Lemmon	Mount Lemmon Survey	TEL	1.9 km	MPC · JPL
281665	2008 VG_{23}	—	November 1, 2008	Kitt Peak	Spacewatch	·	2.4 km	MPC · JPL
281666	2008 VH_{27}	—	November 2, 2008	Kitt Peak	Spacewatch	·	1.9 km	MPC · JPL
281667	2008 VB_{31}	—	November 2, 2008	Mount Lemmon	Mount Lemmon Survey	·	2.6 km	MPC · JPL
281668	2008 VW_{46}	—	November 3, 2008	Kitt Peak	Spacewatch	EOS	3.0 km	MPC · JPL
281669	2008 VA_{51}	—	November 4, 2008	Kitt Peak	Spacewatch	·	3.6 km	MPC · JPL
281670	2008 VS_{57}	—	November 6, 2008	Mount Lemmon	Mount Lemmon Survey	·	2.1 km	MPC · JPL
281671	2008 VU_{57}	—	November 6, 2008	Kitt Peak	Spacewatch	·	2.9 km	MPC · JPL
281672	2008 VD_{60}	—	November 7, 2008	Mount Lemmon	Mount Lemmon Survey	·	2.1 km	MPC · JPL
281673	2008 VW_{70}	—	November 8, 2008	Kitt Peak	Spacewatch	VER	2.9 km	MPC · JPL
281674	2008 VZ_{72}	—	November 1, 2008	Mount Lemmon	Mount Lemmon Survey	·	3.3 km	MPC · JPL
281675	2008 VA_{75}	—	November 6, 2008	Catalina	CSS	EOS	2.6 km	MPC · JPL
281676	2008 VR_{76}	—	November 1, 2008	Mount Lemmon	Mount Lemmon Survey	·	2.5 km	MPC · JPL
281677	2008 VS_{78}	—	November 7, 2008	Mount Lemmon	Mount Lemmon Survey	·	3.6 km	MPC · JPL
281678	2008 VA_{80}	—	November 7, 2008	Mount Lemmon	Mount Lemmon Survey	EOS	3.2 km	MPC · JPL
281679	2008 WE_{2}	—	November 18, 2008	Socorro	LINEAR	TIR	3.9 km	MPC · JPL
281680	2008 WG_{5}	—	November 17, 2008	Kitt Peak	Spacewatch	THM	2.7 km	MPC · JPL
281681	2008 WA_{8}	—	November 17, 2008	Kitt Peak	Spacewatch	·	1.6 km	MPC · JPL
281682	2008 WW_{8}	—	November 17, 2008	Kitt Peak	Spacewatch	·	1.8 km	MPC · JPL
281683	2008 WJ_{13}	—	November 19, 2008	Socorro	LINEAR	·	2.1 km	MPC · JPL
281684	2008 WV_{22}	—	November 18, 2008	Catalina	CSS	(5)	1.6 km	MPC · JPL
281685	2008 WW_{22}	—	November 18, 2008	Catalina	CSS	·	2.3 km	MPC · JPL
281686	2008 WG_{31}	—	November 19, 2008	Mount Lemmon	Mount Lemmon Survey	·	2.1 km	MPC · JPL
281687	2008 WA_{34}	—	November 17, 2008	Kitt Peak	Spacewatch	·	1.9 km	MPC · JPL
281688	2008 WD_{36}	—	November 17, 2008	Kitt Peak	Spacewatch	·	2.4 km	MPC · JPL
281689	2008 WK_{36}	—	November 17, 2008	Kitt Peak	Spacewatch	·	1.5 km	MPC · JPL
281690	2008 WY_{38}	—	November 17, 2008	Kitt Peak	Spacewatch	·	3.3 km	MPC · JPL
281691	2008 WZ_{48}	—	November 18, 2008	Catalina	CSS	EMA	4.2 km	MPC · JPL
281692	2008 WK_{49}	—	November 18, 2008	Catalina	CSS	·	1.3 km	MPC · JPL
281693	2008 WC_{51}	—	November 18, 2008	Kitt Peak	Spacewatch	AST	2.1 km	MPC · JPL
281694	2008 WN_{52}	—	November 19, 2008	Kitt Peak	Spacewatch	·	1.9 km	MPC · JPL
281695	2008 WS_{59}	—	November 18, 2008	Socorro	LINEAR	(5)	1.4 km	MPC · JPL
281696	2008 WW_{59}	—	November 18, 2008	Socorro	LINEAR	·	2.4 km	MPC · JPL
281697	2008 WD_{60}	—	November 19, 2008	Socorro	LINEAR	·	4.2 km	MPC · JPL
281698	2008 WU_{63}	—	November 23, 2008	Calvin-Rehoboth	L. A. Molnar	PHO	3.0 km	MPC · JPL
281699	2008 WX_{66}	—	November 18, 2008	Kitt Peak	Spacewatch	fast	1.5 km	MPC · JPL
281700	2008 WF_{73}	—	November 19, 2008	Mount Lemmon	Mount Lemmon Survey	·	2.8 km	MPC · JPL

== 281701–281800 ==
back to top

Designation			Discovery			Properties		Ref
Permanent	Provisional	Named after	Date	Site	Discoverer(s)	Category	Diam.	Ref
281701	2008 WO_{76}	—	November 20, 2008	Kitt Peak	Spacewatch	·	2.2 km	MPC · JPL
281702	2008 WT_{79}	—	November 20, 2008	Kitt Peak	Spacewatch	·	3.3 km	MPC · JPL
281703	2008 WB_{91}	—	November 23, 2008	Mount Lemmon	Mount Lemmon Survey	AGN	1.4 km	MPC · JPL
281704	2008 WJ_{93}	—	November 21, 2008	Kitt Peak	Spacewatch	KOR	1.6 km	MPC · JPL
281705	2008 WN_{95}	—	November 23, 2008	Socorro	LINEAR	EUP	5.2 km	MPC · JPL
281706	2008 WO_{95}	—	November 23, 2008	Socorro	LINEAR	·	2.4 km	MPC · JPL
281707	2008 WE_{97}	—	November 18, 2008	Catalina	CSS	·	2.9 km	MPC · JPL
281708	2008 WU_{98}	—	November 23, 2008	La Sagra	OAM	(5)	2.0 km	MPC · JPL
281709	2008 WF_{103}	—	November 27, 2008	La Sagra	OAM	·	3.6 km	MPC · JPL
281710	2008 WU_{103}	—	November 30, 2008	Mount Lemmon	Mount Lemmon Survey	·	2.3 km	MPC · JPL
281711	2008 WQ_{105}	—	November 30, 2008	Mount Lemmon	Mount Lemmon Survey	KOR	1.6 km	MPC · JPL
281712	2008 WT_{106}	—	November 30, 2008	Kitt Peak	Spacewatch	·	2.7 km	MPC · JPL
281713	2008 WV_{107}	—	November 30, 2008	Mount Lemmon	Mount Lemmon Survey	AGN	1.3 km	MPC · JPL
281714	2008 WH_{108}	—	November 30, 2008	Catalina	CSS	NEM	2.5 km	MPC · JPL
281715	2008 WJ_{108}	—	November 30, 2008	Catalina	CSS	·	2.1 km	MPC · JPL
281716	2008 WL_{109}	—	November 30, 2008	Kitt Peak	Spacewatch	·	4.2 km	MPC · JPL
281717	2008 WO_{113}	—	November 30, 2008	Kitt Peak	Spacewatch	·	4.9 km	MPC · JPL
281718	2008 WE_{114}	—	November 30, 2008	Kitt Peak	Spacewatch	·	2.6 km	MPC · JPL
281719	2008 WK_{114}	—	November 30, 2008	Mount Lemmon	Mount Lemmon Survey	·	1.8 km	MPC · JPL
281720	2008 WJ_{117}	—	November 30, 2008	Kitt Peak	Spacewatch	·	4.3 km	MPC · JPL
281721	2008 WC_{122}	—	November 30, 2008	Mount Lemmon	Mount Lemmon Survey	·	1.7 km	MPC · JPL
281722	2008 WM_{131}	—	November 17, 2008	Catalina	CSS	·	3.5 km	MPC · JPL
281723	2008 WS_{135}	—	November 19, 2008	Kitt Peak	Spacewatch	EOS	2.5 km	MPC · JPL
281724	2008 WY_{135}	—	November 19, 2008	Kitt Peak	Spacewatch	(5)	2.1 km	MPC · JPL
281725	2008 WJ_{136}	—	November 20, 2008	Kitt Peak	Spacewatch	·	1.4 km	MPC · JPL
281726	2008 WF_{138}	—	September 8, 2007	Anderson Mesa	LONEOS	EOS	2.8 km	MPC · JPL
281727	2008 XE_{1}	—	December 2, 2008	Mayhill	Lowe, A.	·	3.1 km	MPC · JPL
281728	2008 XD_{10}	—	December 2, 2008	Mount Lemmon	Mount Lemmon Survey	·	2.7 km	MPC · JPL
281729	2008 XY_{14}	—	December 1, 2008	Kitt Peak	Spacewatch	KOR	1.5 km	MPC · JPL
281730	2008 XZ_{30}	—	December 2, 2008	Kitt Peak	Spacewatch	·	2.9 km	MPC · JPL
281731	2008 XT_{53}	—	December 1, 2008	Socorro	LINEAR	·	4.3 km	MPC · JPL
281732	2008 XB_{54}	—	December 1, 2008	Socorro	LINEAR	·	2.8 km	MPC · JPL
281733	2008 XK_{54}	—	December 2, 2008	Kitt Peak	Spacewatch	·	4.8 km	MPC · JPL
281734	2008 YG_{1}	—	December 19, 2008	La Sagra	OAM	EOS	3.0 km	MPC · JPL
281735	2008 YE_{9}	—	December 23, 2008	Dauban	Kugel, F.	·	1.8 km	MPC · JPL
281736	2008 YU_{11}	—	December 21, 2008	Mount Lemmon	Mount Lemmon Survey	(16286)	2.1 km	MPC · JPL
281737	2008 YB_{19}	—	December 21, 2008	Mount Lemmon	Mount Lemmon Survey	·	4.6 km	MPC · JPL
281738	2008 YT_{19}	—	December 21, 2008	Mount Lemmon	Mount Lemmon Survey	PHO	1.4 km	MPC · JPL
281739	2008 YW_{20}	—	December 21, 2008	Mount Lemmon	Mount Lemmon Survey	SYL · CYB	5.6 km	MPC · JPL
281740	2008 YH_{27}	—	December 22, 2008	Socorro	LINEAR	·	1.5 km	MPC · JPL
281741	2008 YY_{80}	—	December 30, 2008	Kitt Peak	Spacewatch	·	3.2 km	MPC · JPL
281742	2008 YY_{94}	—	December 29, 2008	Kitt Peak	Spacewatch	·	6.0 km	MPC · JPL
281743	2008 YY_{98}	—	December 29, 2008	Kitt Peak	Spacewatch	·	1.2 km	MPC · JPL
281744	2008 YR_{100}	—	December 29, 2008	Kitt Peak	Spacewatch	VER	3.9 km	MPC · JPL
281745	2008 YZ_{115}	—	December 29, 2008	Kitt Peak	Spacewatch	·	2.4 km	MPC · JPL
281746	2008 YQ_{124}	—	December 30, 2008	Kitt Peak	Spacewatch	THM	2.6 km	MPC · JPL
281747	2008 YX_{156}	—	December 21, 2008	Catalina	CSS	·	4.0 km	MPC · JPL
281748	2008 YZ_{156}	—	December 21, 2008	Kitt Peak	Spacewatch	·	1.6 km	MPC · JPL
281749	2009 AY_{1}	—	January 2, 2009	Dauban	Kugel, F.	VER	5.3 km	MPC · JPL
281750	2009 AQ_{36}	—	January 15, 2009	Kitt Peak	Spacewatch	·	2.0 km	MPC · JPL
281751	2009 AR_{47}	—	January 8, 2009	Kitt Peak	Spacewatch	EMA	3.7 km	MPC · JPL
281752	2009 BF_{6}	—	January 1, 2009	Kitt Peak	Spacewatch	·	3.9 km	MPC · JPL
281753	2009 BD_{8}	—	January 17, 2009	Socorro	LINEAR	·	1.9 km	MPC · JPL
281754	2009 BT_{12}	—	January 21, 2009	Socorro	LINEAR	·	5.3 km	MPC · JPL
281755	2009 BV_{49}	—	January 16, 2009	Mount Lemmon	Mount Lemmon Survey	·	4.8 km	MPC · JPL
281756	2009 BP_{68}	—	January 24, 2009	Purple Mountain	PMO NEO Survey Program	EUP	5.0 km	MPC · JPL
281757	2009 BK_{98}	—	January 26, 2009	Mount Lemmon	Mount Lemmon Survey	SYL · CYB	6.0 km	MPC · JPL
281758	2009 BP_{120}	—	January 31, 2009	Kitt Peak	Spacewatch	·	2.4 km	MPC · JPL
281759	2009 BC_{133}	—	September 21, 2005	Uccle	T. Pauwels	3:2	7.9 km	MPC · JPL
281760	2009 BP_{172}	—	January 18, 2009	Mount Lemmon	Mount Lemmon Survey	·	4.2 km	MPC · JPL
281761	2009 BR_{184}	—	January 18, 2009	Socorro	LINEAR	·	5.9 km	MPC · JPL
281762	2009 DJ_{58}	—	February 22, 2009	Kitt Peak	Spacewatch	·	1.5 km	MPC · JPL
281763	2009 DO_{58}	—	February 22, 2009	Kitt Peak	Spacewatch	·	2.0 km	MPC · JPL
281764 Schwetzingen	2009 DE_{67}	Schwetzingen	February 24, 2009	Calar Alto	F. Hormuth	·	2.5 km	MPC · JPL
281765	2009 FD_{29}	—	March 22, 2009	Catalina	CSS	·	2.9 km	MPC · JPL
281766	2009 FM_{74}	—	March 16, 2009	Purple Mountain	PMO NEO Survey Program	EOS	3.0 km	MPC · JPL
281767	2009 FE_{77}	—	March 19, 2009	Kitt Peak	Spacewatch	DOR	2.6 km	MPC · JPL
281768	2009 HN_{5}	—	April 17, 2009	Kitt Peak	Spacewatch	·	1.8 km	MPC · JPL
281769	2009 HD_{23}	—	April 17, 2009	Kitt Peak	Spacewatch	·	4.7 km	MPC · JPL
281770	2009 HG_{52}	—	April 17, 2009	Catalina	CSS	·	4.1 km	MPC · JPL
281771	2009 RR_{23}	—	March 26, 2003	Kitt Peak	Spacewatch	(5)	1.5 km	MPC · JPL
281772 Matttaylor	2009 RS_{26}	Matttaylor	September 13, 2009	ESA OGS	Busch, M., Kresken, R.	·	1.9 km	MPC · JPL
281773	2009 RG_{74}	—	September 15, 2009	Kitt Peak	Spacewatch	·	1.1 km	MPC · JPL
281774	2009 RG_{76}	—	September 15, 2009	Kitt Peak	Spacewatch	·	2.7 km	MPC · JPL
281775	2009 SW_{43}	—	September 16, 2009	Kitt Peak	Spacewatch	·	3.4 km	MPC · JPL
281776	2009 SK_{48}	—	September 16, 2009	Kitt Peak	Spacewatch	·	1.9 km	MPC · JPL
281777	2009 ST_{154}	—	February 8, 2007	Mount Lemmon	Mount Lemmon Survey	NYS	1.0 km	MPC · JPL
281778	2009 SB_{168}	—	September 19, 2009	Catalina	CSS	·	2.5 km	MPC · JPL
281779	2009 SP_{183}	—	September 21, 2009	Kitt Peak	Spacewatch	H	590 m	MPC · JPL
281780	2009 SO_{232}	—	September 19, 2009	Catalina	CSS	·	3.4 km	MPC · JPL
281781	2009 SK_{234}	—	September 27, 2009	Kitt Peak	Spacewatch	·	5.5 km	MPC · JPL
281782	2009 SM_{234}	—	September 16, 2009	Catalina	CSS	EOS	3.7 km	MPC · JPL
281783	2009 ST_{337}	—	September 28, 2009	Catalina	CSS	·	5.7 km	MPC · JPL
281784	2009 SH_{352}	—	September 20, 2009	Mount Lemmon	Mount Lemmon Survey	fast	1.1 km	MPC · JPL
281785	2009 TO_{36}	—	October 14, 2009	La Sagra	OAM	HYG	4.2 km	MPC · JPL
281786	2009 TY_{41}	—	October 12, 2009	Mount Lemmon	Mount Lemmon Survey	·	1.5 km	MPC · JPL
281787	2009 UG_{35}	—	October 21, 2009	Mount Lemmon	Mount Lemmon Survey	·	890 m	MPC · JPL
281788	2009 UO_{37}	—	October 22, 2009	Mount Lemmon	Mount Lemmon Survey	·	1.3 km	MPC · JPL
281789	2009 UP_{38}	—	October 22, 2009	Mount Lemmon	Mount Lemmon Survey	·	1.5 km	MPC · JPL
281790	2009 UL_{91}	—	October 18, 2009	Catalina	CSS	·	2.7 km	MPC · JPL
281791	2009 UD_{94}	—	October 28, 2009	La Sagra	OAM	H	690 m	MPC · JPL
281792	2009 UC_{106}	—	October 21, 2009	Mount Lemmon	Mount Lemmon Survey	·	1.1 km	MPC · JPL
281793	2009 UX_{111}	—	October 24, 2009	Kitt Peak	Spacewatch	·	1.1 km	MPC · JPL
281794	2009 US_{132}	—	October 17, 2009	Catalina	CSS	·	2.8 km	MPC · JPL
281795	2009 UW_{137}	—	October 24, 2009	Catalina	CSS	·	3.7 km	MPC · JPL
281796	2009 VV_{7}	—	November 8, 2009	Catalina	CSS	·	1.2 km	MPC · JPL
281797	2009 VA_{39}	—	November 9, 2009	Kitt Peak	Spacewatch	·	1.3 km	MPC · JPL
281798	2009 VP_{39}	—	November 10, 2009	La Sagra	OAM	·	3.5 km	MPC · JPL
281799	2009 VW_{47}	—	November 9, 2009	Mount Lemmon	Mount Lemmon Survey	·	1.2 km	MPC · JPL
281800	2009 VW_{113}	—	November 8, 2009	Kitt Peak	Spacewatch	·	970 m	MPC · JPL

== 281801–281900 ==
back to top

Designation			Discovery			Properties		Ref
Permanent	Provisional	Named after	Date	Site	Discoverer(s)	Category	Diam.	Ref
281801	2009 WS_{34}	—	November 16, 2009	Kitt Peak	Spacewatch	·	1.5 km	MPC · JPL
281802	2009 WO_{43}	—	November 17, 2009	Kitt Peak	Spacewatch	MAS	1.0 km	MPC · JPL
281803	2009 WG_{45}	—	March 15, 2007	Mount Lemmon	Mount Lemmon Survey	·	1.9 km	MPC · JPL
281804	2009 WD_{48}	—	November 19, 2009	Kitt Peak	Spacewatch	·	2.9 km	MPC · JPL
281805	2009 WX_{53}	—	November 17, 2009	Socorro	LINEAR	·	1.6 km	MPC · JPL
281806	2009 WX_{73}	—	November 18, 2009	Kitt Peak	Spacewatch	·	820 m	MPC · JPL
281807	2009 WC_{76}	—	November 18, 2009	Kitt Peak	Spacewatch	·	1.2 km	MPC · JPL
281808	2009 WH_{117}	—	November 21, 2003	Kitt Peak	Deep Ecliptic Survey	·	1 km	MPC · JPL
281809	2009 WW_{119}	—	November 20, 2009	Kitt Peak	Spacewatch	·	4.0 km	MPC · JPL
281810	2009 WG_{133}	—	November 22, 2009	Kitt Peak	Spacewatch	·	1.1 km	MPC · JPL
281811	2009 WF_{139}	—	November 26, 2009	Pingelly	D. Chestnov, A. Novichonok	·	790 m	MPC · JPL
281812	2009 WR_{164}	—	November 21, 2009	Kitt Peak	Spacewatch	·	1.5 km	MPC · JPL
281813	2009 WB_{195}	—	November 24, 2009	Purple Mountain	PMO NEO Survey Program	·	1.4 km	MPC · JPL
281814	2009 WM_{203}	—	November 16, 2009	Kitt Peak	Spacewatch	·	3.8 km	MPC · JPL
281815	2009 WR_{206}	—	November 17, 2009	Kitt Peak	Spacewatch	·	1.2 km	MPC · JPL
281816	2009 WZ_{214}	—	November 21, 2009	Kitt Peak	Spacewatch	·	940 m	MPC · JPL
281817	2009 WK_{215}	—	November 26, 2009	Catalina	CSS	·	1.5 km	MPC · JPL
281818	2009 WL_{233}	—	November 17, 2009	Mount Lemmon	Mount Lemmon Survey	·	1.9 km	MPC · JPL
281819	2009 WS_{250}	—	November 24, 2009	Kitt Peak	Spacewatch	JUN	1.8 km	MPC · JPL
281820 Monnaves	2009 XW	Monnaves	December 9, 2009	Cabrils	Montcabre, Observatorio	·	1.7 km	MPC · JPL
281821	2009 XH_{21}	—	December 10, 2009	Mount Lemmon	Mount Lemmon Survey	·	1.6 km	MPC · JPL
281822	2009 XE_{24}	—	December 11, 2009	Socorro	LINEAR	·	2.5 km	MPC · JPL
281823	2009 XQ_{24}	—	December 10, 2009	Mount Lemmon	Mount Lemmon Survey	·	1.3 km	MPC · JPL
281824	2009 YN_{5}	—	December 17, 2009	Mount Lemmon	Mount Lemmon Survey	·	3.7 km	MPC · JPL
281825	2009 YA_{7}	—	December 18, 2009	Mayhill	Evdokimova, E.	·	1.8 km	MPC · JPL
281826	2009 YG_{20}	—	December 26, 2009	Kitt Peak	Spacewatch	·	1.4 km	MPC · JPL
281827	2009 YT_{23}	—	December 18, 2009	Kitt Peak	Spacewatch	HNS	1.7 km	MPC · JPL
281828	2009 YN_{25}	—	December 19, 2009	Kitt Peak	Spacewatch	·	1.7 km	MPC · JPL
281829	2010 AR_{5}	—	January 5, 2010	Kitt Peak	Spacewatch	HNS	1.5 km	MPC · JPL
281830	2010 AF_{20}	—	January 7, 2010	Mount Lemmon	Mount Lemmon Survey	·	1.6 km	MPC · JPL
281831	2010 AG_{41}	—	January 6, 2010	Kitt Peak	Spacewatch	·	2.5 km	MPC · JPL
281832	2010 AA_{65}	—	January 11, 2010	Kitt Peak	Spacewatch	EUN	2.9 km	MPC · JPL
281833	2010 AC_{65}	—	January 11, 2010	Kitt Peak	Spacewatch	AGN	1.5 km	MPC · JPL
281834	2010 AO_{68}	—	January 12, 2010	Kitt Peak	Spacewatch	·	4.1 km	MPC · JPL
281835	2010 AR_{68}	—	January 12, 2010	Catalina	CSS	·	2.7 km	MPC · JPL
281836	2010 AM_{71}	—	January 12, 2010	Mount Lemmon	Mount Lemmon Survey	·	4.1 km	MPC · JPL
281837	2010 AV_{71}	—	January 13, 2010	Kitt Peak	Spacewatch	·	2.1 km	MPC · JPL
281838	2010 AX_{72}	—	January 13, 2010	Mount Lemmon	Mount Lemmon Survey	·	1.8 km	MPC · JPL
281839	2010 AY_{77}	—	January 14, 2010	Kitt Peak	Spacewatch	·	3.5 km	MPC · JPL
281840	2010 AB_{79}	—	January 12, 2010	Catalina	CSS	·	2.9 km	MPC · JPL
281841	2010 AM_{80}	—	January 8, 2010	Kitt Peak	Spacewatch	·	1.7 km	MPC · JPL
281842	2010 AL_{81}	—	January 12, 2010	Kitt Peak	Spacewatch	·	3.1 km	MPC · JPL
281843	2010 CS_{24}	—	February 9, 2010	Mount Lemmon	Mount Lemmon Survey	KOR	1.5 km	MPC · JPL
281844	2010 CR_{29}	—	February 9, 2010	Kitt Peak	Spacewatch	EOS	2.3 km	MPC · JPL
281845	2010 CH_{41}	—	February 6, 2010	Mount Lemmon	Mount Lemmon Survey	·	3.2 km	MPC · JPL
281846	2010 CR_{41}	—	February 5, 2010	Catalina	CSS	·	3.1 km	MPC · JPL
281847	2010 CC_{44}	—	February 13, 2010	Calvin-Rehoboth	Calvin College	TEL	1.9 km	MPC · JPL
281848	2010 CR_{55}	—	February 12, 2010	Socorro	LINEAR	·	1.2 km	MPC · JPL
281849	2010 CO_{62}	—	February 9, 2010	Catalina	CSS	·	5.1 km	MPC · JPL
281850	2010 CP_{67}	—	February 10, 2010	Kitt Peak	Spacewatch	·	3.7 km	MPC · JPL
281851	2010 CC_{70}	—	February 13, 2010	Mount Lemmon	Mount Lemmon Survey	·	3.5 km	MPC · JPL
281852	2010 CP_{77}	—	February 13, 2010	Mount Lemmon	Mount Lemmon Survey	EOS	2.9 km	MPC · JPL
281853	2010 CS_{78}	—	February 13, 2010	Mount Lemmon	Mount Lemmon Survey	HOF	3.8 km	MPC · JPL
281854	2010 CH_{82}	—	February 13, 2010	Kitt Peak	Spacewatch	·	2.2 km	MPC · JPL
281855	2010 CA_{94}	—	October 2, 2003	Kitt Peak	Spacewatch	·	3.1 km	MPC · JPL
281856	2010 CP_{96}	—	February 14, 2010	Mount Lemmon	Mount Lemmon Survey	·	3.5 km	MPC · JPL
281857	2010 CK_{128}	—	February 9, 2010	Catalina	CSS	·	3.1 km	MPC · JPL
281858	2010 CY_{128}	—	February 9, 2010	Catalina	CSS	·	3.9 km	MPC · JPL
281859	2010 CV_{138}	—	February 15, 2010	Mount Lemmon	Mount Lemmon Survey	KOR	1.6 km	MPC · JPL
281860	2010 CK_{139}	—	February 9, 2010	Catalina	CSS	·	2.2 km	MPC · JPL
281861	2010 CZ_{165}	—	February 10, 2010	Kitt Peak	Spacewatch	·	3.0 km	MPC · JPL
281862	2010 CM_{167}	—	February 14, 2010	Mount Lemmon	Mount Lemmon Survey	·	4.2 km	MPC · JPL
281863	2010 CN_{179}	—	February 9, 2010	Catalina	CSS	THB	3.4 km	MPC · JPL
281864	2010 CX_{243}	—	February 2, 2010	WISE	WISE	·	5.9 km	MPC · JPL
281865	2010 DL_{11}	—	February 16, 2010	Mount Lemmon	Mount Lemmon Survey	HOF	3.2 km	MPC · JPL
281866	2010 DW_{11}	—	February 16, 2010	Mount Lemmon	Mount Lemmon Survey	·	4.6 km	MPC · JPL
281867	2010 DR_{41}	—	February 17, 2010	Kitt Peak	Spacewatch	·	4.4 km	MPC · JPL
281868	2010 DH_{70}	—	February 28, 2010	WISE	WISE	·	3.1 km	MPC · JPL
281869	2010 EV_{2}	—	March 5, 2010	Farra d'Isonzo	Farra d'Isonzo	(1118)	5.4 km	MPC · JPL
281870	2010 EH_{66}	—	March 10, 2010	Purple Mountain	PMO NEO Survey Program	CYB	5.8 km	MPC · JPL
281871	2010 EX_{88}	—	March 14, 2010	Mount Lemmon	Mount Lemmon Survey	·	3.1 km	MPC · JPL
281872	2010 EU_{92}	—	March 14, 2010	Kitt Peak	Spacewatch	·	3.2 km	MPC · JPL
281873	2010 EC_{99}	—	March 14, 2010	Kitt Peak	Spacewatch	·	2.2 km	MPC · JPL
281874	2010 ES_{102}	—	March 15, 2010	Mount Lemmon	Mount Lemmon Survey	CYB	4.0 km	MPC · JPL
281875	2010 ES_{138}	—	March 15, 2010	Mount Lemmon	Mount Lemmon Survey	·	3.2 km	MPC · JPL
281876	2010 FP_{35}	—	March 18, 2010	WISE	WISE	·	2.5 km	MPC · JPL
281877	2010 FA_{83}	—	March 19, 2010	Kitt Peak	Spacewatch	HOF	3.8 km	MPC · JPL
281878	2010 GT_{24}	—	April 7, 2010	Mount Lemmon	Mount Lemmon Survey	AST	2.5 km	MPC · JPL
281879	2010 GW_{119}	—	October 20, 2003	Kitt Peak	Spacewatch	·	2.3 km	MPC · JPL
281880 Wuweiren	2010 GK_{126}	Wuweiren	January 24, 2004	Socorro	LINEAR	·	5.1 km	MPC · JPL
281881	2010 HO_{78}	—	April 20, 2010	Kitt Peak	Spacewatch	·	2.6 km	MPC · JPL
281882	2010 HD_{104}	—	April 20, 2010	Siding Spring	SSS	·	5.3 km	MPC · JPL
281883	2010 JB_{49}	—	May 7, 2010	Kitt Peak	Spacewatch	·	3.2 km	MPC · JPL
281884	2010 JM_{83}	—	May 6, 2010	Mount Lemmon	Mount Lemmon Survey	·	1.3 km	MPC · JPL
281885	2010 JH_{163}	—	May 8, 2010	Mount Lemmon	Mount Lemmon Survey	·	3.9 km	MPC · JPL
281886	2010 KM_{110}	—	May 29, 2010	WISE	WISE	·	5.8 km	MPC · JPL
281887	2010 LR_{1}	—	June 5, 2010	Pla D'Arguines	R. Ferrando	·	2.4 km	MPC · JPL
281888	2010 LY_{33}	—	June 1, 2010	Kitt Peak	Spacewatch	H	500 m	MPC · JPL
281889	2010 LC_{62}	—	June 5, 2010	Kitt Peak	Spacewatch	NEM	3.4 km	MPC · JPL
281890	2010 OA_{74}	—	July 25, 2010	WISE	WISE	·	3.3 km	MPC · JPL
281891	2010 PA_{78}	—	June 16, 2009	Kitt Peak	Spacewatch	·	5.5 km	MPC · JPL
281892	2010 XL_{19}	—	November 16, 2006	Kitt Peak	Spacewatch	·	1.7 km	MPC · JPL
281893	2011 AS	—	October 10, 2002	Apache Point	SDSS	·	1.3 km	MPC · JPL
281894	2011 AF_{29}	—	February 2, 2000	Kitt Peak	Spacewatch	·	4.4 km	MPC · JPL
281895	2011 AC_{49}	—	December 4, 2005	Kitt Peak	Spacewatch	EOS	2.6 km	MPC · JPL
281896	2011 BQ	—	November 22, 2006	Mount Lemmon	Mount Lemmon Survey	·	1.1 km	MPC · JPL
281897	2011 BS_{5}	—	September 5, 2000	Kitt Peak	Spacewatch	·	1.8 km	MPC · JPL
281898	2011 BP_{25}	—	May 10, 2007	Catalina	CSS	·	3.2 km	MPC · JPL
281899	2011 CW_{9}	—	December 6, 2005	Kitt Peak	Spacewatch	·	1.7 km	MPC · JPL
281900	2011 CP_{17}	—	February 27, 2006	Kitt Peak	Spacewatch	THM	2.5 km	MPC · JPL

== 281901–282000 ==
back to top

Designation			Discovery			Properties		Ref
Permanent	Provisional	Named after	Date	Site	Discoverer(s)	Category	Diam.	Ref
281901	2011 CR_{17}	—	December 7, 2002	Kitt Peak	Spacewatch	·	1.8 km	MPC · JPL
281902	2011 CB_{19}	—	February 3, 2000	Socorro	LINEAR	V	920 m	MPC · JPL
281903	2011 CP_{20}	—	March 2, 2000	Kitt Peak	Spacewatch	·	5.0 km	MPC · JPL
281904	2011 CX_{49}	—	August 25, 2004	Kitt Peak	Spacewatch	·	2.1 km	MPC · JPL
281905	2011 CJ_{72}	—	May 13, 2007	Mount Lemmon	Mount Lemmon Survey	·	2.7 km	MPC · JPL
281906	2011 CB_{77}	—	November 25, 2009	Mount Lemmon	Mount Lemmon Survey	·	3.7 km	MPC · JPL
281907	2011 DX_{2}	—	October 16, 2006	Catalina	CSS	·	940 m	MPC · JPL
281908	2011 EQ_{16}	—	August 11, 1997	Kitt Peak	Spacewatch	·	3.7 km	MPC · JPL
281909	2011 ED_{24}	—	January 17, 2005	Kitt Peak	Spacewatch	·	3.5 km	MPC · JPL
281910	2011 EG_{28}	—	October 23, 2003	Apache Point	SDSS	·	2.3 km	MPC · JPL
281911	2011 EU_{51}	—	March 25, 2006	Kitt Peak	Spacewatch	·	3.0 km	MPC · JPL
281912	2011 EX_{52}	—	December 13, 2006	Kitt Peak	Spacewatch	·	930 m	MPC · JPL
281913	2011 EZ_{53}	—	October 9, 1993	La Silla	E. W. Elst	PHO	1.3 km	MPC · JPL
281914	2011 EF_{63}	—	June 29, 2004	Siding Spring	SSS	PHO	2.1 km	MPC · JPL
281915	2011 ET_{71}	—	September 23, 2005	Catalina	CSS	·	870 m	MPC · JPL
281916	2011 EW_{76}	—	December 1, 2005	Mount Lemmon	Mount Lemmon Survey	·	2.7 km	MPC · JPL
281917	2011 FA	—	November 27, 1998	Kitt Peak	Spacewatch	EOS	2.3 km	MPC · JPL
281918	2011 FE_{2}	—	April 10, 2003	Kitt Peak	Spacewatch	·	2.0 km	MPC · JPL
281919	2011 FO_{6}	—	March 17, 2005	Kitt Peak	Spacewatch	·	3.6 km	MPC · JPL
281920	2011 FR_{9}	—	September 29, 2008	Catalina	CSS	EOS	2.7 km	MPC · JPL
281921	2011 FN_{11}	—	April 8, 2002	Kitt Peak	Spacewatch	·	2.2 km	MPC · JPL
281922	2011 FY_{11}	—	September 11, 2002	Palomar	NEAT	·	2.4 km	MPC · JPL
281923	2011 FX_{12}	—	May 1, 1997	Kitt Peak	Spacewatch	·	2.5 km	MPC · JPL
281924	2011 FZ_{12}	—	November 17, 2001	Socorro	LINEAR	·	1.6 km	MPC · JPL
281925	2011 FT_{13}	—	February 6, 2006	Mount Lemmon	Mount Lemmon Survey	AGN	1.4 km	MPC · JPL
281926	2011 FW_{13}	—	March 13, 2005	Kitt Peak	Spacewatch	LUT	3.2 km	MPC · JPL
281927	2011 FV_{19}	—	October 16, 1999	Kitt Peak	Spacewatch	·	2.6 km	MPC · JPL
281928	2011 FN_{30}	—	March 11, 2002	Palomar	NEAT	EUN	1.6 km	MPC · JPL
281929	2011 FB_{32}	—	November 21, 2003	Kitt Peak	Spacewatch	·	3.4 km	MPC · JPL
281930	2011 FG_{45}	—	January 15, 2001	Kitt Peak	Spacewatch	·	880 m	MPC · JPL
281931	2011 FV_{46}	—	October 8, 2004	Kitt Peak	Spacewatch	·	1.6 km	MPC · JPL
281932	2011 FL_{48}	—	May 14, 2004	Kitt Peak	Spacewatch	·	840 m	MPC · JPL
281933	2011 FJ_{83}	—	October 9, 2002	Socorro	LINEAR	·	4.2 km	MPC · JPL
281934	2011 FG_{138}	—	September 9, 2008	Mount Lemmon	Mount Lemmon Survey	·	2.1 km	MPC · JPL
281935	2011 FF_{142}	—	September 23, 2008	Kitt Peak	Spacewatch	·	3.0 km	MPC · JPL
281936	2011 FT_{142}	—	February 13, 2007	Mount Lemmon	Mount Lemmon Survey	·	820 m	MPC · JPL
281937	2011 FZ_{142}	—	April 2, 2006	Mount Lemmon	Mount Lemmon Survey	·	2.6 km	MPC · JPL
281938	2011 FC_{143}	—	March 3, 2005	Kitt Peak	Spacewatch	·	3.1 km	MPC · JPL
281939	2011 FQ_{143}	—	January 31, 2006	Mount Lemmon	Mount Lemmon Survey	·	2.3 km	MPC · JPL
281940	2011 FH_{147}	—	September 7, 2004	Kitt Peak	Spacewatch	GEF	1.6 km	MPC · JPL
281941	2011 FF_{148}	—	October 15, 1995	Kitt Peak	Spacewatch	·	2.4 km	MPC · JPL
281942	2011 FD_{150}	—	November 30, 2005	Kitt Peak	Spacewatch	RAF	1.3 km	MPC · JPL
281943	2011 FM_{154}	—	February 27, 2007	Kitt Peak	Spacewatch	NYS	1.0 km	MPC · JPL
281944	2011 GT_{3}	—	September 23, 2008	Mount Lemmon	Mount Lemmon Survey	·	3.1 km	MPC · JPL
281945	2011 GR_{9}	—	April 5, 2003	Anderson Mesa	LONEOS	·	1.8 km	MPC · JPL
281946	2011 GH_{12}	—	March 18, 2002	Kitt Peak	Spacewatch	WIT	1.4 km	MPC · JPL
281947	2011 GG_{31}	—	February 29, 2000	Socorro	LINEAR	NYS	1.1 km	MPC · JPL
281948	2011 GH_{32}	—	April 25, 2007	Kitt Peak	Spacewatch	·	1.1 km	MPC · JPL
281949	2011 GA_{34}	—	October 9, 2004	Kitt Peak	Spacewatch	AGN	1.3 km	MPC · JPL
281950	2011 GS_{36}	—	September 5, 2007	Catalina	CSS	·	3.0 km	MPC · JPL
281951	2011 GR_{39}	—	February 5, 2006	Mount Lemmon	Mount Lemmon Survey	WIT	1.4 km	MPC · JPL
281952	2011 GE_{46}	—	March 12, 1996	Kitt Peak	Spacewatch	·	960 m	MPC · JPL
281953	2011 GU_{46}	—	March 5, 2006	Kitt Peak	Spacewatch	(13314)	2.9 km	MPC · JPL
281954	2011 GJ_{55}	—	September 29, 2003	Kitt Peak	Spacewatch	·	2.3 km	MPC · JPL
281955	2011 GM_{55}	—	December 14, 2004	Kitt Peak	Spacewatch	·	2.6 km	MPC · JPL
281956	2011 GU_{55}	—	February 10, 2005	Campo Imperatore	CINEOS	·	3.1 km	MPC · JPL
281957	2011 GR_{57}	—	September 23, 2008	Mount Lemmon	Mount Lemmon Survey	HOF	3.2 km	MPC · JPL
281958	2011 GP_{58}	—	August 23, 2001	Kitt Peak	Spacewatch	NYS	820 m	MPC · JPL
281959	2011 GG_{59}	—	March 13, 2003	Kitt Peak	Spacewatch	NYS	1.1 km	MPC · JPL
281960	2011 GF_{61}	—	July 27, 2001	Anderson Mesa	LONEOS	·	1.1 km	MPC · JPL
281961	2011 GK_{63}	—	March 11, 2002	Kitt Peak	Spacewatch	·	2.0 km	MPC · JPL
281962	2011 GX_{63}	—	November 1, 2005	Mount Lemmon	Mount Lemmon Survey	·	1.4 km	MPC · JPL
281963	2011 GB_{64}	—	October 3, 2008	Mount Lemmon	Mount Lemmon Survey	·	1.7 km	MPC · JPL
281964	2011 GN_{65}	—	November 19, 2004	Catalina	CSS	H	670 m	MPC · JPL
281965	2011 GP_{66}	—	February 25, 2007	Kitt Peak	Spacewatch	BAR	1.0 km	MPC · JPL
281966	2011 GZ_{66}	—	December 8, 2005	Kitt Peak	Spacewatch	ADE	2.6 km	MPC · JPL
281967	2011 GO_{69}	—	August 22, 2007	Anderson Mesa	LONEOS	·	4.2 km	MPC · JPL
281968	2011 GR_{69}	—	May 24, 2001	Cerro Tololo	Deep Ecliptic Survey	THM	2.6 km	MPC · JPL
281969	2011 GT_{69}	—	September 27, 2003	Kitt Peak	Spacewatch	·	2.2 km	MPC · JPL
281970	2011 GV_{69}	—	August 8, 2007	Siding Spring	SSS	·	2.4 km	MPC · JPL
281971	2011 GC_{70}	—	December 1, 2005	Kitt Peak	Spacewatch	·	1.6 km	MPC · JPL
281972	2011 GF_{70}	—	October 7, 2004	Kitt Peak	Spacewatch	·	2.8 km	MPC · JPL
281973	2011 GV_{71}	—	December 19, 2004	Mount Lemmon	Mount Lemmon Survey	·	2.4 km	MPC · JPL
281974	2011 GM_{72}	—	May 3, 2002	Kitt Peak	Spacewatch	·	2.5 km	MPC · JPL
281975	2011 GR_{72}	—	September 30, 2003	Kitt Peak	Spacewatch	·	3.8 km	MPC · JPL
281976	2011 GC_{78}	—	June 23, 1995	Kitt Peak	Spacewatch	·	3.7 km	MPC · JPL
281977	2011 HS_{8}	—	December 18, 1995	Kitt Peak	Spacewatch	·	2.9 km	MPC · JPL
281978	2011 HQ_{9}	—	December 21, 2006	Kitt Peak	Spacewatch	·	920 m	MPC · JPL
281979	2011 HR_{10}	—	June 25, 2000	Kitt Peak	Spacewatch	·	1.2 km	MPC · JPL
281980	2011 HB_{11}	—	December 2, 2005	Kitt Peak	Spacewatch	·	1.6 km	MPC · JPL
281981	2011 HJ_{12}	—	March 11, 2002	Palomar	NEAT	·	2.2 km	MPC · JPL
281982	2011 HN_{13}	—	January 12, 2004	Palomar	NEAT	·	4.4 km	MPC · JPL
281983	2011 HX_{17}	—	March 25, 2006	Kitt Peak	Spacewatch	·	2.2 km	MPC · JPL
281984	2011 HQ_{18}	—	February 16, 2002	Kitt Peak	Spacewatch	·	1.8 km	MPC · JPL
281985	2011 HR_{18}	—	March 9, 2005	Catalina	CSS	·	4.4 km	MPC · JPL
281986	2011 HK_{20}	—	February 2, 2001	Kitt Peak	Spacewatch	AST	2.3 km	MPC · JPL
281987	2011 HV_{21}	—	May 22, 2003	Kitt Peak	Spacewatch	·	1.2 km	MPC · JPL
281988	2011 HY_{21}	—	March 10, 2005	Catalina	CSS	·	4.7 km	MPC · JPL
281989	2011 HE_{23}	—	November 23, 1998	Kitt Peak	Spacewatch	V	680 m	MPC · JPL
281990	2011 HZ_{25}	—	October 12, 2001	Haleakala	NEAT	·	1.8 km	MPC · JPL
281991	2011 HM_{26}	—	February 27, 2006	Mount Lemmon	Mount Lemmon Survey	·	2.8 km	MPC · JPL
281992	2011 HU_{27}	—	March 16, 2007	Catalina	CSS	V	1 km	MPC · JPL
281993	2011 HW_{28}	—	October 26, 1995	Kitt Peak	Spacewatch	(883)	940 m	MPC · JPL
281994	2011 HY_{28}	—	January 31, 2003	Palomar	NEAT	·	1.7 km	MPC · JPL
281995	2011 HC_{29}	—	April 20, 1996	Kitt Peak	Spacewatch	·	1.5 km	MPC · JPL
281996	2011 HX_{29}	—	March 3, 2005	Kitt Peak	Spacewatch	VER	3.7 km	MPC · JPL
281997	2011 HR_{32}	—	August 1, 2001	Palomar	NEAT	·	3.8 km	MPC · JPL
281998	2011 HF_{35}	—	September 21, 2001	Palomar	NEAT	·	1.0 km	MPC · JPL
281999	2011 HH_{36}	—	November 11, 2004	Catalina	CSS	·	2.2 km	MPC · JPL
282000	2011 HU_{36}	—	December 18, 2003	Kitt Peak	Spacewatch	·	3.9 km	MPC · JPL

back to top

== See also ==
- Meanings of minor-planet names: 281001–282000
