= Meanings of minor-planet names: 281001–282000 =

As minor planet discoveries are confirmed, they are given a permanent number by the IAU's Minor Planet Center (MPC), and the discoverers can then submit names for them, following the IAU's naming conventions. The list below concerns those minor planets in the specified number-range that have received names, and explains the meanings of those names.

Official naming citations of newly named small Solar System bodies are approved and published in a bulletin by IAU's Working Group for Small Bodies Nomenclature (WGSBN). Before May 2021, citations were published in MPC's Minor Planet Circulars for many decades. Recent citations can also be found on the JPL Small-Body Database (SBDB). Until his death in 2016, German astronomer Lutz D. Schmadel compiled these citations into the Dictionary of Minor Planet Names (DMP) and regularly updated the collection.

Based on Paul Herget's The Names of the Minor Planets, Schmadel also researched the unclear origin of numerous asteroids, most of which had been named prior to World War II. This article incorporates text from this source, which is in the public domain: SBDB New namings may only be added to this list below after official publication as the preannouncement of names is condemned. The WGSBN publishes a comprehensive guideline for the naming rules of non-cometary small Solar System bodies.

== 281001–281100 ==
Named minor planet	Provisional	This minor planet was named for...	Ref · Catalog
281007 Oliviaperrotto	2006 DR_{204}	Olivia “Liv” Perrotto, bright American teenager with a passion for space science. She was invited by the Inspiration4 crew to witness their launch, and she designed the zero-gravity indicator for the Polaris Dawn mission. Her courage and love of the cosmos, undeterred by life's challenges, touched many lives.	IAU · 281007
281067 Barmby	2006 KU_{130}	Pauline Margaret Barmby (b. 1972), a Canadian astronomer.	IAU · 281067
281068 Chipolin	2006 OK_{1}	Chi Po-lin (1964–2017) was a Taiwanese documentary filmmaker, photographer and environmentalist, best known for his 2013 film Beyond Beauty: Taiwan from Above, which won Best Documentary at the 2013 Golden Horse Awards.	JPL · 281068

== 281101–281200 ==
back to top

Named minor planet	Provisional	This minor planet was named for...	Ref · Catalog
281105 Dionneross	2006 WT_{198}	Dionne Leah Cozier Ross (b. 1981), an American pediatrician.	IAU · 281105
281140 Trier	2007 DO_{7}	The Germany city of Trier, the birthplace of Karl Marx. It was founded by the Romans in 16 BCE, numerous historic monuments make it an outstanding testimony to the Roman Empire. The association Sternwarte Trier is heavily involved in astronomical education.	JPL · 281140

== 281201–281300 ==
back to top

Named minor planet	Provisional	This minor planet was named for...	Ref · Catalog
281208 Žebrauskas	2007 GV_{51}	Tomas Žebrauskas (Polish: Żebrowski; 1714-1758), Lithuanian Jesuit astronomer and architect.	IAU · 281208
281247 Egryjózsef	2007 MA_{4}	József Egry, Hungarian painter, considered a significant representative of Hungarian modernism.	IAU · 281247
281272 Arnaudleroy	2007 RC_{12}	Arnaud Leroy (born 1974), a French amateur astronomer at the Uranoscope Observatory and Pic du Midi Observatory in Paris and the Pyrenees, respectively	JPL · 281272

== 281301–281400 ==
back to top

Named minor planet	Provisional	This minor planet was named for...	Ref · Catalog
There are no named minor planets in this number range

== 281401–281500 ==
back to top

Named minor planet	Provisional	This minor planet was named for...	Ref · Catalog
281445 Scotthowe	2008 SS_{84}	A. Scott Howe (born 1960), an American engineer at the Jet Propulsion Laboratory	JPL · 281445
281459 Kyrylenko	2008 SU_{148}	The brothers Peter Kyrylenko (born 1987) and Dmytro Kyrylenko (born 1985), observers at the Andrushivka Observatory in Ukraine	JPL · 281459

== 281501–281600 ==
back to top

Named minor planet	Provisional	This minor planet was named for...	Ref · Catalog
281507 Johnellen	2008 TM_{9}	John and Ellen McDonald, parents of Irish amateur astronomer David McDonald who discovered this minor planet at the Celbridge Observatory (J65)	JPL · 281507
281561 Taitung	2008 UL_{78}	Taitung County, located in the southeast of Taiwan	JPL · 281561
281564 Fuhsiehhai	2008 UQ_{87}	Hsieh-Hai Fu (1952—2020) was serve at the Department of Earth Sciences, National Taiwan Normal University, specializing in astronomy and science education, and training university students to teach astronomy in secondary education. He is the founder of the Star Watcher journal and the author of several popular science books.	JPL · 281564
281569 Taea	2008 UV_{94}	Tainan Astronomical Education Area (TAEA) is an astronomy museum in Tainan, Taiwan. TAEA has been dedicated to fundamental astronomy education since it was established in 2007.	JPL · 281569

== 281601–281700 ==
back to top

Named minor planet	Provisional	This minor planet was named for...	Ref · Catalog
281661 Michaelsiems	2008 VW_{13}	Michael Siems (b. 1960), a German boomerang thrower who began building boomerangs in 1982. He is a longtime friend of the discoverer.	IAU · 281661

== 281701–281800 ==
back to top

Named minor planet	Provisional	This minor planet was named for...	Ref · Catalog
281764 Schwetzingen	2009 DE_{67}	Schwetzingen is a mid-sized town in the southwest of Germany. The first written reference "Suezzingen" dates back to 766 CE, while settlement can be traced back to the Stone Age. It is best known for its large baroque castle and surrounding park complex. Another famed specialty is the locally grown asparagus.	JPL · 281764
281772 Matttaylor	2009 RS_{26}	Matt Taylor (born 1973), a British astrophysicist, involved in the landing of the Philae spacecraft on a comet during ESA's Rosetta mission	JPL · 281772

== 281801–281900 ==
back to top

Named minor planet	Provisional	This minor planet was named for...	Ref · Catalog
281820 Monnaves	2009 XW	Ramon ("Mon") Naves Jr., son of one of the discoverers at Montcabre Observatory (213), Spain	JPL · 281820
281880 Wuweiren	2010 GK_{126}	Wu Weiren (born 1953), an academician of Chinese Academy of Engineering, is the Chief Designer of China's Lunar Exploration Program, and has contributed significantly to China's lunar and deep-space exploration. The Chang'e-4 mission, which he designed, accomplished the first soft-landing on the far side of the Moon.	JPL · 281880

== 281901–282000 ==
back to top

Named minor planet	Provisional	This minor planet was named for...	Ref · Catalog
There are no named minor planets in this number range

back to top

Preceded by 280,001–281,000	Meanings of minor-planet names List of minor planets: 281,001–282,000	Succeeded by 282,001–283,000
