= Lunghwa University of Science and Technology =

University in Taoyuan City, Taiwan

Coordinates: 25°1′10.29″N 121°24′3.51″E

- 龍華科技大學
- Motto: 勤、敬、誠、樸(Chinese) (Pe̍h-ōe-jī: Khîn, kèng, sêng, phok)
- Motto in English: Diligence, Dedication, Honesty, and Simplicity
- Type: Vocational/Technical education, Science and technology education
- Established: Founded 1969; Upgraded in 1998; Renamed in 2001
- President: Dr.Tzu-Hsiang Ko
- Academic staff: 250 (2011Y December)
- Students: 6,117(2011YMarch)
- Undergraduates: 5,048
- Postgraduates: 2,215
- Location: 33306, NO. 300, Sec. 1, Wanshou Rd., Guishan District, Taoyuan City, Taiwan, R.O.C., Republic of China
- Campus: Urban and Suburban
- Website: www.lhu.edu.tw

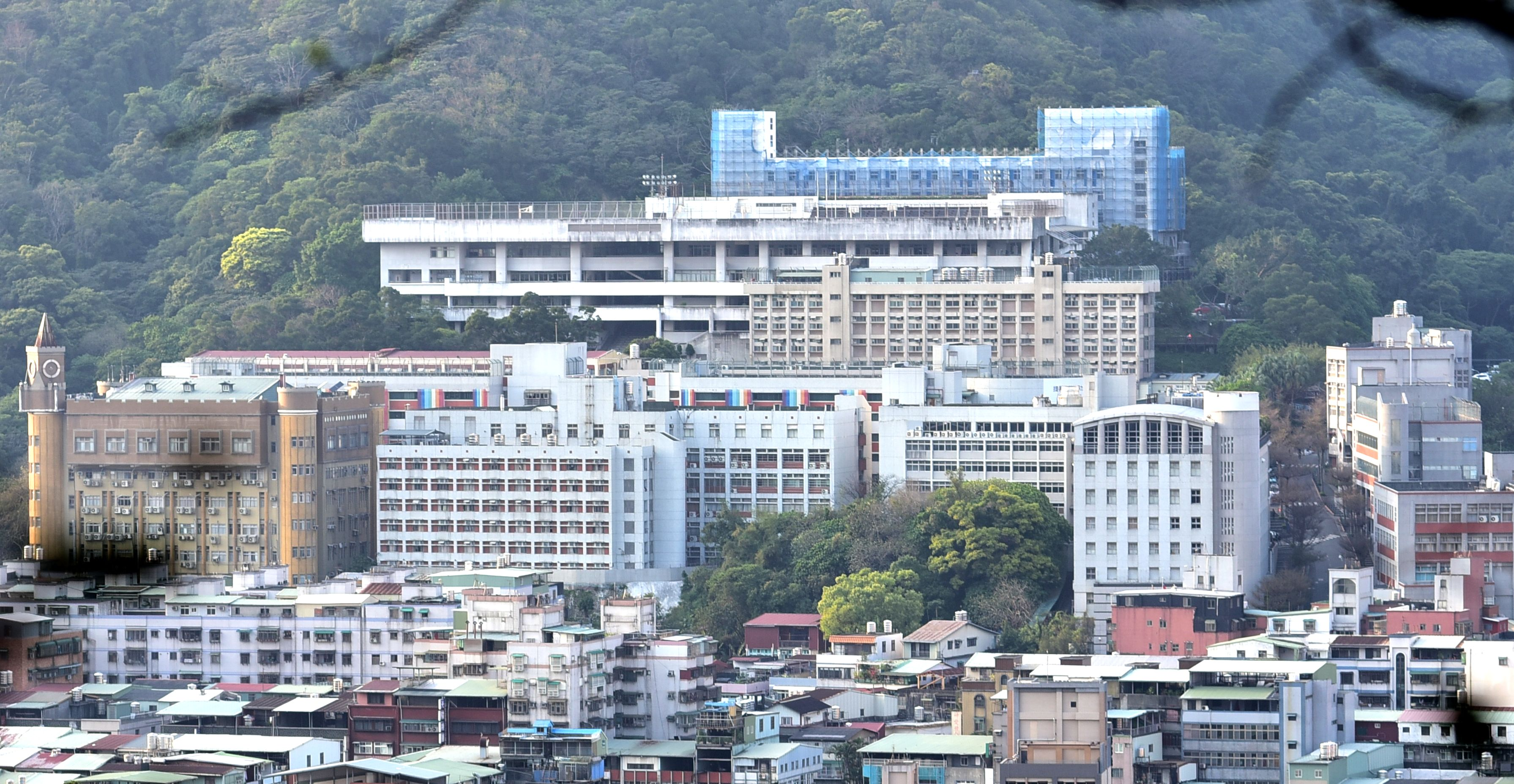
Lunghwa University of Science and Technology in 2018

Lunghwa University of Science and Technology
- Traditional Chinese: 龍華科技大學
Transcriptions
Standard Mandarin
- Hanyu Pinyin: Lónghuá Kējì Dàxué
Southern Min
- Hokkien POJ: Liông-hôa Kho-ki Tāi-ha̍k

Lunghwa University of Science and Technology (LHU; Chinese: 龍華科技大學; Pe̍h-ōe-jī: Liông-hôa Kho-ki Tāi-ha̍k) is a private university of science and technology in the Taiwanese vocational education system, originally based in Guishan District, Taoyuan City, Taiwan.

As its spirit of fundamental of initial creation in its school song, "a technical skill can be valued unlimitedly; both hands can be creating infinitely for country."

Popular undergraduate majors at LHU include electronics, business, mechanic, engineering, finance, philology, international business, industrial management, multi-media and gaming science, tourism and leisure science and computer science. Popular fields of study among graduate students include electronics, engineering, computer science and finance. LHU claims to provide HTC, TSMC, UMC and other famous firms with more engineering, computer science and business graduates than any other college or university, and philanthropic support of LHU is among the highest in the Taiwanese vocational education system and technical education system.

== Colleges and departments ==
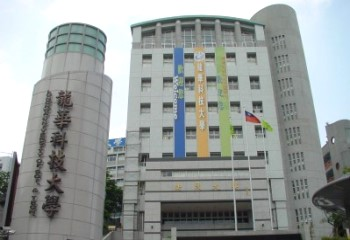
Lunghwa University of Science and Technology

There are three colleges at LHU.

=== College of Engineering ===
- Department of Mechanical Engineering
- Department of Chemical and Materials Engineering
- Department of Electrical Engineering
- Department of Electronic Engineering
- Department of Computer Information and Network Engineering

=== College of Management ===
- Department of International Business
- Department of Finance
- Department of Business Administration
- Department of Information Management
- Department of Industrial Management

=== College of Humanities and Design ===
- Department of Applied Foreign Languages
- Department of Multimedia and Game Science
- Department of Cultural Creativity and Digital Media Design
- Department of Tourism and Recreation

== Sister universities ==
Sister schools of Lunghwa include:

Name	Location	Date
Technos International college	Japan	January 14, 1985
Mercer University	Macon, Georgia, U.S.A.	August 14, 1996
University of Sunderland	United Kingdom	October 20, 1996
Lawrence Technological University	Southfield, Michigan, U.S.A.	August 11, 1996
Beijing University of Technology	China	October 18, 2001
Capital University of Economics and Business	China	October 19, 2001
Beijing Technology and Business University	China	October 18, 2001
Nanjing University of Science & Technology	China	October 23, 2001
University of South Australia	Australia	January 14, 2002
Northwestern Polytechnic University	U.S.A.	April 19, 2002
University of Bridgeport	U.S.A.	May 20, 2002
University of Canberra	Australia	January 6, 2002
University of Detroit-Mercy	U.S.A.	November 6, 2002
University of Santiago de Compostela	Spain	November 6, 2002
University of Westminster	United Kingdom	August 30, 2002
Hanoi University of Economics	Hanoi, Vietnam	April 25, 2004
Hanoi University of Business and Management	Vietnam	April 25, 2004
Shenzhen Polytechnic	China	September 7, 2004
Moscow State Institute of Radio-engineering Electronics and Automation	Russia	June 22, 2004
Moscow Aviation Institute	Russia	June 22, 2004
Pittsburg State University	U.S.A.	February 16, 2005
Hanoi University of Technology	Vietnam	March 17, 2005
Queen's University Belfast	United Kingdom	June 21, 2005
Akita University	Japan	July 15, 2005
Utsunomiya University	Japan	July 28, 2005
Youngstown State University	U.S.A.	April 10, 2005
Western Kentucky University	U.S.A.	September 1, 2006
Kharkiv University	Ukraine	August 2, 2006
University of Primorska	Slovenia	April 20, 2006
University of Minnesota Crookston	U.S.A.	November 12, 2006
University of Minnesota	Crookston.	April 20, 2007
Ho Chi Minh City University of Industry	Vietnam	November 6, 2007
Dublin City University	Ireland	June 29, 2007
Kyungmin College	Korea	September 27, 2007
Royal Brisbane International College	Australia	September 27, 2007
Don Bosco Institute of Technology, Mumbai	India	August 11, 2007
Hanoi University of Technology	Vietnam	August 1, 2008
National Key Polytechnics under Construction	China	June 12, 2008
Xiamen Nanyang University	China	February 20, 2009

== Alumni ==
- Chan I-hua – performed self-immolation on May 19, 1989 when the funeral procession of fellow activist Cheng Nan-jung (who had similarly immolated himself) was blocked by the police in front of the Presidential Office Building in Taipei on what is now called Ketagalan Boulevard.
- Chi Po-lin – photographer and film director

== See also ==
- List of universities in Taiwan
- List of universities in Taoyuan County, Taiwan
