= Eco-nationalism =

Political ideology combining environmentalism with nationalism

Eco-nationalism (also known as ecological nationalism or green nationalism) is a synthesis of nationalism and green politics. Eco-nationalists may be from many points across the left–right political spectrum, but all are bound to the idea that the nation-state and its citizens have a special duty to protect the environment of their country.

== Definitions and tenets ==
According to Jane Dawson, eco-nationalism is the rise of social movements that closely connect problems of environment protection with nationalist concerns. Dawson also surmised that eco-nationalism is "the synthesis of environmentalism, national identity, and the struggle for justice". (Note: "Justice" here may refer to both environmental justice and social justice.) Professors of history K. Sivaramakrishnan and Gunnel Cederlöf have defined eco-nationalism as, whether nativist or cosmopolitan in nature, "when the state appropriates the environment and environmental policies as forms of national pride, thereby consolidating and legitimating the nation."

One of the first instances of eco-nationalism was in the 1980s in the then Soviet Union, where citizens perceived environmental degradation as both a systemic fault of socialism and a direct result of Moscow's desire to weaken a particular nation by destroying its natural base, and exploiting its resources. Estonian, Lithuanian and Ukrainian independence movements drew great strength from environmental activism, especially from an antinuclear stance. In 1985–1991, eco-nationalism was one of the symptoms and at the same time a new impulse of the disintegration of the Soviet Union.

Eco-nationalism as defined by anthropologists often manifests in the adoption of nature as an entity outside of culture that must be protected in its pristine and untouched state whenever possible. In subaltern studies and cultural anthropology, eco-nationalism refers to the iconification of native species and landscapes in a way that appeals to a nationalist sentiment.

=== Ethnic Eco-nationalism vs. Civic Eco-nationalism ===
When discussing eco-nationalism, many writers have noted it is important to understand the difference between ethnic nationalism and civic nationalism. Ethnic nationalism believes that the nation-state should be constructed primarily around a single ethnicity, whereas civic nationalism believes that the nation-state should be constructed around a diversity of people who all share common values, beliefs, and culture. The former tends to be insular, isolationist, nativist, and typically right-wing, while the latter is open, egalitarian, multicultural, and typically more left-wing. Whether ethno nationalist or civic nationalist, when a nationalist group adds an environmentalist dimension to their ideology, they believe the nation-state and its citizens have a duty to protect the environment of the country.

=== Bioregionalism ===
Bioregionalism is the belief that political, cultural, and economic systems are more environmentally sustainable and just if they are organized around naturally defined areas called bioregions. This idea that a state should conform to the natural geography of the land is compatible with the older nationalist concept of a natural border, which also believes that natural geography should determine the borders of a state. Due to the compatibility of these two ideas, Bioregionalism is often a tenet of eco-nationalist thought.

=== Ecotourism and cultural eco-nationalism ===
Eco-nationalism can manifest in ecotourism, which can enrich local economies but has garnered criticism from a variety of perspectives. Artistic works that extol the virtues of a nation's natural phenomena, such as the poetry of William Wordsworth or the paintings of the Group of Seven, are another expression of eco-nationalism.

== National examples ==
=== Africa ===
==== Nigeria ====
The flag of the Ogoni people

The struggle of the Ogoni people in Ogoniland in coastal south Nigeria against the national government has been characterised as an eco-nationalist movement by Jane Dawson. Following the discovery of oil in the region during the 1960s, the federal government altered how states in Nigeria were budgeted. Before the discovery of oil, a state's budget was based on how much it contributed to the national economy, but after the discovery of oil, the policy became that wealth must be shared out amongst all states. The result of this was that little of the newfound wealth being generated in Ogoniland was reinvested locally, and was instead redistributed to the more politically powerful states in the north of the country. The small percentage of wealth reinvested into Ogoniland was invested into building oil infrastructure, infrastructure which had dire environmental consequences on the region. As a result, Ogoni nationalism took on a distinctive environmentalist dimension in response to these issues.

=== Asia ===
==== China ====
In China, eco-nationalism is manifested through the state-led ideology of "Ecological civilization" (shengtai wenming), which became a central pillar of Xi Jinping Thought and was enshrined in the Chinese Communist Party (CCP) constitution in 2017. This shift represents a transition from "resource nationalism"—which prioritized industrial growth at the expense of the environment—to a "green nationalism" where environmental stewardship is directly linked to the state's performance legitimacy.

The government utilizes "traditional Chinese ecological wisdom," such as the concept of harmony between humanity and nature, to frame its environmental policies as a culturally authentic alternative to Western liberal democratic models. A key element of this discourse is the "Two Mountains Theory," which posits that "lucid waters and lush mountains are invaluable assets" (equivalent to gold and silver mountains). This ideology is promoted through state-led rituals, such as national tree-planting campaigns, and is integrated into school curricula to cultivate a "green" national identity.

While the narrative is primarily top-down, it involves the participation of domestic NGOs, academics, and private actors who reproduce these narratives in a process described as "banal green nationalism". Internationally, China leverages its environmental efforts—such as hosting the COP15 and establishing the Kunming Biodiversity Fund—to assert global leadership and enhance the international prestige of its governance model. However, scholars note that this model remains distinct from "reflexive green nationalism" seen in some European contexts, as the Chinese party-state restricts environmental criticism that challenges central authority.

==== India ====
The struggle of the practitioners of the Sarna sthal religion in India, particularly in the Jharkhand state, to receive official recognition from the state has been described by some as an "eco-nationalist" one, as the Sarna identity has been suggested to born out of a sense of nation infused with ecological thinking.

==== Taiwan ====
Some scholars have suggested that Civic Eco-nationalism is a distinct feature of Taiwanese politics. Similar to countries in the Eastern Bloc in the 1980s, Environmentalism protests in Taiwan in the 1990s were a means by which the citizens could indirectly criticise the party-state. Just like the Baltic nations in the Soviet Union, Environmentalism as a mass movement began in Taiwan as a backlash against the introduction of Nuclear power. Protests against the construction of the Lungmen Nuclear Power Plant led by Lin Yi-hsiung in 1994 have been cited as a foundation point for Eco-nationalism in Taiwan as well as part of the momentum that led to Taiwan's transition to democracy in the late 1990s and 2000s. Part of Chen Shui-bian's platform in the historic 2000 Taiwanese presidential election, in which the ruling Kuomintang lost for the first time ever, was to halt the construction of the Lungmen plant. The issue of nuclear power, and specifically Lungmen, have never been resolved in Taiwan and following the Fukushima nuclear disaster in Japan in 2011, the issue of nuclear power once again became a key issue in Taiwanese politics.

Members of Taiwan's indigenous peoples protesting in 2017 as part of the Indigenous Ketagalan Boulevard protest

Another area in which Taiwanese environmentalism and eco-nationalism can be seen demonstrated is in the politics of Taiwan's indigenous population. A persistent critique in Taiwan is that land traditionally held by indigenous Taiwanese has been transformed by the state into mines and national parks, while the indigenous have been prevented by the state from using the same land for homes or for hunting. In 2018, a member of the New Power Party stated that 80% of Taiwan's 217 mining areas were located in aboriginal territories. This situation has led to the ongoing Indigenous Ketagalan Boulevard protest, which began in 2017. Another example of the environmental burden placed on indigenous Taiwanese has been the issue of nuclear waste dumping practised in secret by the state on the largely indigenous Orchid Island. The discovery of this nuclear dumping led to mass protests in 2002. The sentiment that the price of Taiwan's industrial development has unfairly fallen on indigenous communities has led to the growth of Eco-nationalism in Taiwan, with Eco-Nationalists arguing that the struggle of the indigenous must be tied to environmentalism and that there must be environmental justice for the indigenous.

Another cited example of a merger of Taiwanese nationalism and environmentalism is in the increasing environmental aspect of the "huan-dao"; the huan-dao is an emerging Taiwanese tradition in which a Taiwanese citizen cycles the entire length of the country along Taiwan Cycling Route No.1. Considered both a coming-of-age ritual as well as an act of Taiwanese patriotism, a developing aspect of the huan-dao is for travellers to collect and dispose of waste along the route as a patriotic act.

=== Europe ===
==== Baltic nations and Ukraine ====
As noted above, some of the first instances of eco-nationalism were observed in Estonia, Latvia, Lithuania and Ukraine in the 1980s. It was during this time period that nationalists in those countries discovered that the Soviet Union did not seek to block anti-government activity if it was under the banner of environmentalism. Thus nationalists in those countries threw themselves into environmental causes, particular after the Chernobyl disaster. In Estonia, eco-nationalists campaigned on the issues of oil-shale pollution, nuclear risk and mineral (phosphate) mining. In Latvia, fears about the potential damages to the natural environment by large hydro-dams on the Daugava River, as well as concerns that the symbols of the Latvian nation the Oak and Linden tree species were being destroyed. The eco-nationalism of Estonia, Latvia, Lithuania and Ukraine are described as being eco-civic-nationalist rather than eco-ethno-nationalist.

==== Scotland ====
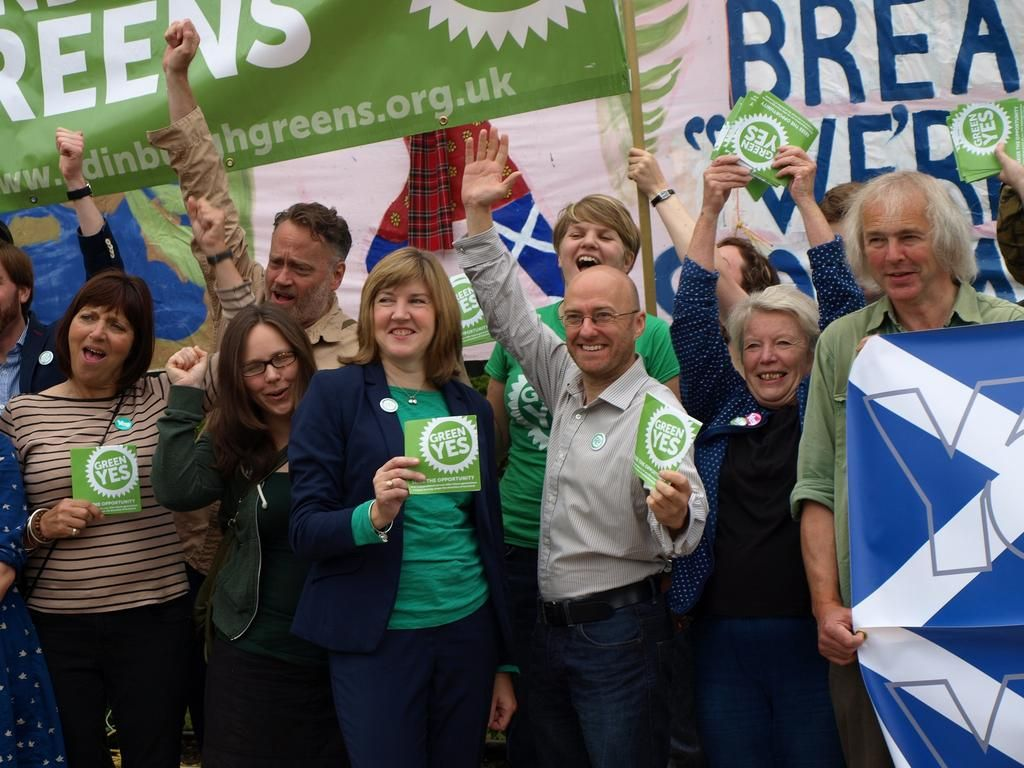
Members of the Scottish Greens supporting the Yes Scotland campaign for Scottish Independence

The centre-left, civic nationalist Scottish National Party has been described in some sources as eco-nationalist; Espousing Scottish nationalism, the SNP has accused the Westminster government of being a "negligent landlord" that tosses its waste and pollution in Scotland. The SNP is noted for a longstanding willingness to work alongside environmental activists. In 2019 the SNP-led Scottish government was one of the first countries in the world to officially declare a climate emergency and followed this up with the radical Climate Change (Emissions Reduction Targets) (Scotland) Act 2019. The act was subsequently praised by the UN as "an inspiring example of the level of ambition we need globally to achieve the Paris Agreement". Following the 2021 Scottish Parliament election, the SNP and Scottish Greens entered into a ruling coalition together. Like the SNP, the Scottish Greens favour independence from the United Kingdom.

==== Spain ====
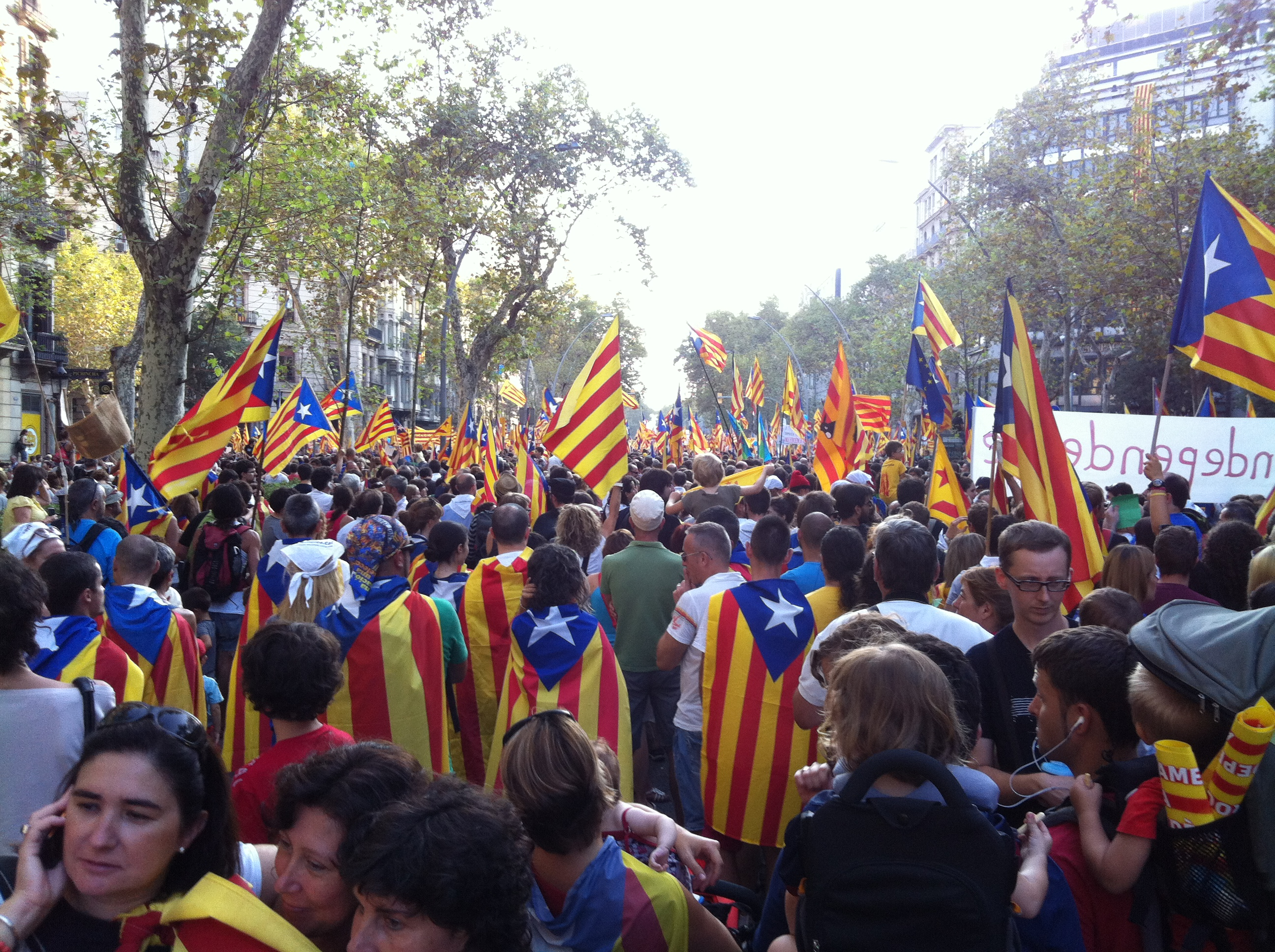
Pro-Independence Catalans during a protest in 2012. The Estelada can be seen throughout.

Republican Left of Catalonia, a center-left Catalan nationalist party, has been described as eco-nationalist. In 2017 they passed a climate emergency declaration through the Catalan parliament that would have taken radical actions such as banning fracking, planning a closure of all nuclear facilities by 2027 and a reduction in CO_{2} emissions of 27% at a minimum by 2030. However, the Spanish supreme court vetoed the act after deeming it to be unconstitutional because it exceed the scope of powers granted to regional parliaments in Spain. In addition to their work in the Catalan parliament, the ERC (Esquerra Republicana de Catalunya) have been praised by the Climate Action Network for their work in the European Parliament, where between 2014 and 2019 ERC were deemed to have a pro-climate voting record even better than Spain's main green party, Greens Equo, and were ranked amongst the best performers on green issues of any party sitting in the entire European Parliament.

The left-wing Galician Nationalist Bloc has also been called eco-nationalist. The party has called for laws that would provide protection to the landscape and ecosystems while addressing issues of mobility, waste, energy, mining and water management. In 2019 the party asked for the creation of a crisis cabinet at the regional level in Spain to act on the climate emergency, as well as to tackle the threat of invasive species as a threat to water management and biodiversity.

==== France ====
In 2014, the nationalist leader of the French National Front, Marine Le Pen, launched a 'patriotic ecology' project. Termed New Ecology, the movement branded itself on a nativist form of environmentalism - encouraging locally sourced products being an example. In keeping with Le Pen's nationalist agenda, Le Pen described open borders as "anti-ecological". Conversely, Le Pen also promised to "decree an immediate moratorium on wind energy" In an article in the Huffington Post, the Danish entrepreneur Jens Martin Skibsted, reported that he once saw Marine Le Pen's father and former leader of the National Front, Jean-Marie Le Pen, "cut a water melon in two to demonstrate that green environmentalists were in fact hidden red communists."

==== Hungary ====
The Hungarian political party Our Homeland Movement has been described as chauvinistically eco-nationalist in orientation; for example, the party has called on Hungarians to show patriotism by supporting the removal of pollution from the Tisza River while simultaneously placing the blame on the pollution on Romania and Ukraine. Elements of the far-right Sixty-Four Counties Youth Movement proscribe themselves to the "Eco-Nationalist" label, with one member stating "no real nationalist is a climate denialist".

==== Russia ====
The new age religious movement Anastasianism, which stresses the people's spiritual connection to nature, has been described in academia as being "eco-nationalist" in political outlook.

==== Germany ====
German intellectuals from the 19th century, like Wilhelm Riehl, and Theodor Fontane, espoused ideals such as German nationalism and rootedness, in terms of the land as a food source and being German ground. German soil and German blood are nearly synonymous, or at least very closely related, in these contexts. This agro-romanticism was also popularized amongst Nazis because German cities were "Jew-ridden," according to Adolf Bartels, a National Democratic Party member and journalist.

German magazines Umwelt and Aktiv have been identified as a potential "camouflage publication" for the National Democratic Party. The NPD is a far-right political organization, whose personal publications do not in themselves promote antisemitic ideas, but are frequently used for antisemitic purposes. Umwelt and Aktiv contains information about gardening and genetically-modified food, as well as right-wing propaganda and slurs. These magazines are not the only modern trace of the far-right green movement. In northern Germany, individuals with right-wing and ecologically-driven beliefs created new settlements inspired by agro-romanticism. These individuals grow their own food and knit with wool from their own livestock. Their food is sold through Biopark, an organic cultivation organization. Consumers have been warned of the risk of supporting the National Democratic Party, and Biopark has been questioned on the ethics of allowing members to sell through them. The organization’s vetting process is done only through cultivation practices. A farmer and former candidate for a party position questioned why left-wing individuals have dominated the ecological scene. The German Greens are Europe’s most successful environmental party ever since their rise in the 1980s.

=== Oceania ===
==== Australia and New Zealand ====
Patriotic pride in the country's landscape and environment is particularly visible in countries such as Australia and New Zealand, which are known for their unique animal life. Eco-nationalism is also marked by national pride in natural wonders such as the Great Barrier Reef or Mitre Peak, extensive conservation efforts towards iconic species such as the kākāpō and largetooth sawfish, and the creation of National Parks in order to protect these species and areas. While beneficial for conservation efforts, eco-nationalism has been criticized as an extension of colonialist dichotomies and ontologies and rarely addresses Indigenous ecological knowledge.

The Oil Free Wellington group and its sister projects in other areas of New Zealand, a movement that campaigned against deep-sea drilling for oil off the coast of New Zealand because of the damage it was doing to the nation, has been described as another example of New Zealander Eco-Nationalism.

== See also ==
- Eco-capitalism
- Greenwashing
- Indigenism
- Left-wing Nationalism
- Water is Life

== Bibliography ==
- Dawson J. I. Eco-Nationalism: Anti-Nuclear Activism and National Identity in Russia, Lithuania, and Ukraine. - Duke University Press Books, 1996. - 240 p.
- Efremenko D. Eco-nationalism and the Crisis of Soviet Empire (1986-1991) // Irish Slavonic Studies. – vol. 24. – Dublin: IARCEES, 2012. – pp. 17–20.
- Josephson P., Dronin N., Mnatsakanyan R., Cherp A., Efremenko D., Larin A. An Environmental History of Russia. – New York: Cambridge University Press, 2013. – 341 p.
- Neslen, A. (2014, December 18). French National Front launches nationalist environmental movement. The Guardian. Retrieved from https://www.theguardian.com/uk
- Carroll, B. (2017). A Role for Art in Ecological Thought. Concentric: Literary and Cultural Studies, 43(1), 145–164.
- Skibsted, J.M. (2014). Foreign climate: Why European right-wingers should be treehuggers. Huffington Post.
