= Indigenous Ketagalan Boulevard protest =

Indigenous protests at Ketagalan Boulevard, Taipei

Indigenous Ketagalan Boulevard protest (凱道部落)
- People dancing and singing at the Indigenous Ketagalan Boulevard protest on Ketagalan Boulevard, 5 March 2017.
- Date: As of 23 February 2017 (3467 days)
- Location: Ketagalan Boulevard; 25°02′22″N 121°30′55″E(until 3 June 2017) Taipei Metro National Taiwan University Hospital Station Exit 1; 25°02′27.49″N 121°30′56.77″E(as of 3 June 2017)
- Methods: Protest Sit-in Nonviolence

Parties
Taiwanese aborigines	Government of the Republic of China

Lead figures
Panay Kusui Nabu Husungan Istanda (那布) Mayaw Biho	Tsai Ing-wen (蔡英文), President of Taiwan Council of Indigenous Peoples

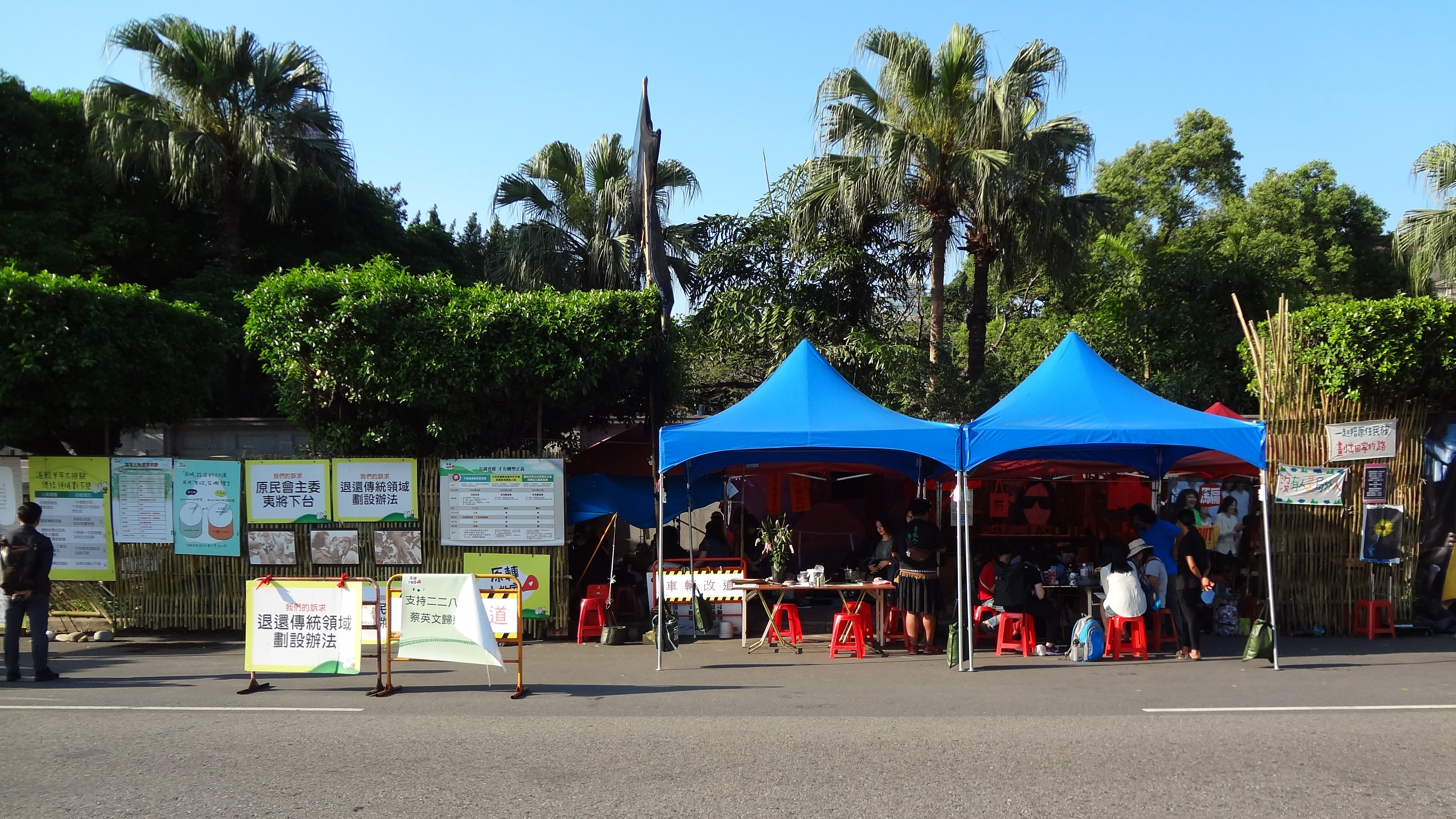
A view of the protest on 29 April 2017, at that time still on Ketagalan Boulevard in Zhongzheng District, Taipei City.

The Indigenous Ketagalan Boulevard protest is an ongoing protest in Taiwan started on Ketagalan Boulevard in Taipei City by Taiwanese aborigines in February 2017 asking for more official recognition of land as traditional territories, in particular for the possibility of private land to also be designated as indigenous territory, which was not allowed for by the February 2017 regulations brought forward by the governmental Council of Indigenous Peoples.

Some more prominent figures who have led the protests are activist Panai Kusui, her husband Nabu Husungan Istanda (那布) and documentary filmmaker Mayaw Biho. One of the movements' slogans is "No one is an outsider" (Chinese: 沒有人是局外人).

== History ==
On 14 February 2017 the Council of Indigenous Peoples held a press conference on the "Regulations for Demarcating Indigenous Traditional Territories" (Chinese: 原住民族土地或部落範圍土地劃設辦法) and on 18 February 2017 the same governmental body officially proclaimed those regulations. Because the regulations excluded private land from what was designated as indigenous land in the draft proposal, only around eight hundred thousands hectares of land would be recognized as traditional territory, which was in sharp contrast with an earlier estimate by the same Council of Indigenous Peoples, based on a survey completed in 2007, in which it was said that around 1.8 million hectares of land should be designated as such. This was the reason for the start of the "Indigenous Ketagalan Boulevard protest" on 23 February.

The activists feared that the police would destroy their campout before the first anniversary of the inauguration of president Tsai Ing-wen on 20 May 2017. Because, on 3 June 2017, the protest site was destroyed by the police, the activists resettled the protest to the Taipei Metro National Taiwan University Hospital Station.

=== Relation to other protests ===
==== Sunflower movement ====
Sunflower Student Movement leader Lin Fei-fan actively joined the first day of the Indigenous Ketagalan Boulevard protest. Later, on 28 February 2017, on Peace Memorial Day, which commemorates the February 28 Incident, Lin Fei-fan again joined the protest, marching towards 228 Peace Memorial Park and afterwards published a later translated essay in which he claims "to stand with Taiwan’s indigenous peoples" on the issue.

==== Asia Cement's mining rights ====
In June and July 2017, thousands of people protested between the building of the Executive Yuan and the Presidential Office Building to raise concerns about the twenty-year extension of the mining rights of the corporation Asia Cement (part of the Far Eastern Group conglomerate) granted on 14 March 2017 without conducting an environmental impact assessment. The protestors being large in numbers was said to be following the death of Taiwanese documentary maker Chi Po-Lin earlier in June while filming a sequel to his 2013 film "Beyond Beauty: Taiwan From Above", as the release of Chi's final footage of the "Sincheng Mine" (referring to Asia Cement's mine in Hualien County's Xincheng Township) in which one could purportedly see the company having expanded it operations, while the latter claimed it had reduced them, went viral.

Activist Panay Kusui joined these environmental protesters, on the common grounds of accusing the government of not protecting Aboriginal land from exploitation. The environmental activists of the protests against Asia Cement's extension of mining rights, on their turn, joined the relocated protest site of the Indigenous Ketagalan Boulevard protest. Nabu Husungan Istanda (那布) claimed that a friendship and cooperation thus arose between the indigenous and environmental protesters.

== Popular culture ==
On 17 March 2017, the English singer and songwriter Joss Stone, as part of her "Total World Tour", went to learn a song from the protest leader Panay Kusui and sing it together with her where Panai had been camping out twenty-three days at the protest sit-in, then still located on Ketagalan Boulevard. In the video which resulted from this collaboration Stone briefly introduces the Indigenous Ketagalan Boulevard protest.
