= Chan I-hua =

Taiwanese activist (1957–1989)

- 詹益樺
- Born: 22 February 1957; Chiayi County, Taiwan
- Died: 19 May 1989 (aged 32); Taipei, Taiwan
- Cause of death: Burns from self-immolation
- Education: Lunghwa University of Science and Technology

Chan I-hua (Chinese: 詹益樺; pinyin: Zhān Yìhuà; Pe̍h-ōe-jī: Chiam Ek-hôa; 22 February 1957 – 19 May 1989) was a Taiwanese pro-democracy activist and graduate of Lunghwa University of Science and Technology. He performed self-immolation on May 19, 1989, when the funeral procession of fellow activist Cheng Nan-jung (who had similarly immolated himself) was blocked by the police in front of the Presidential Office Building in Taipei on what is now called Ketagalan Boulevard.

== See also ==
- List of political self-immolations
- Cheng Nan-jung
- Taiwan independence
