= Ketagalan Boulevard =

Major arterial road in Taipei

Coordinates: 25°02′22″N 121°30′55″E

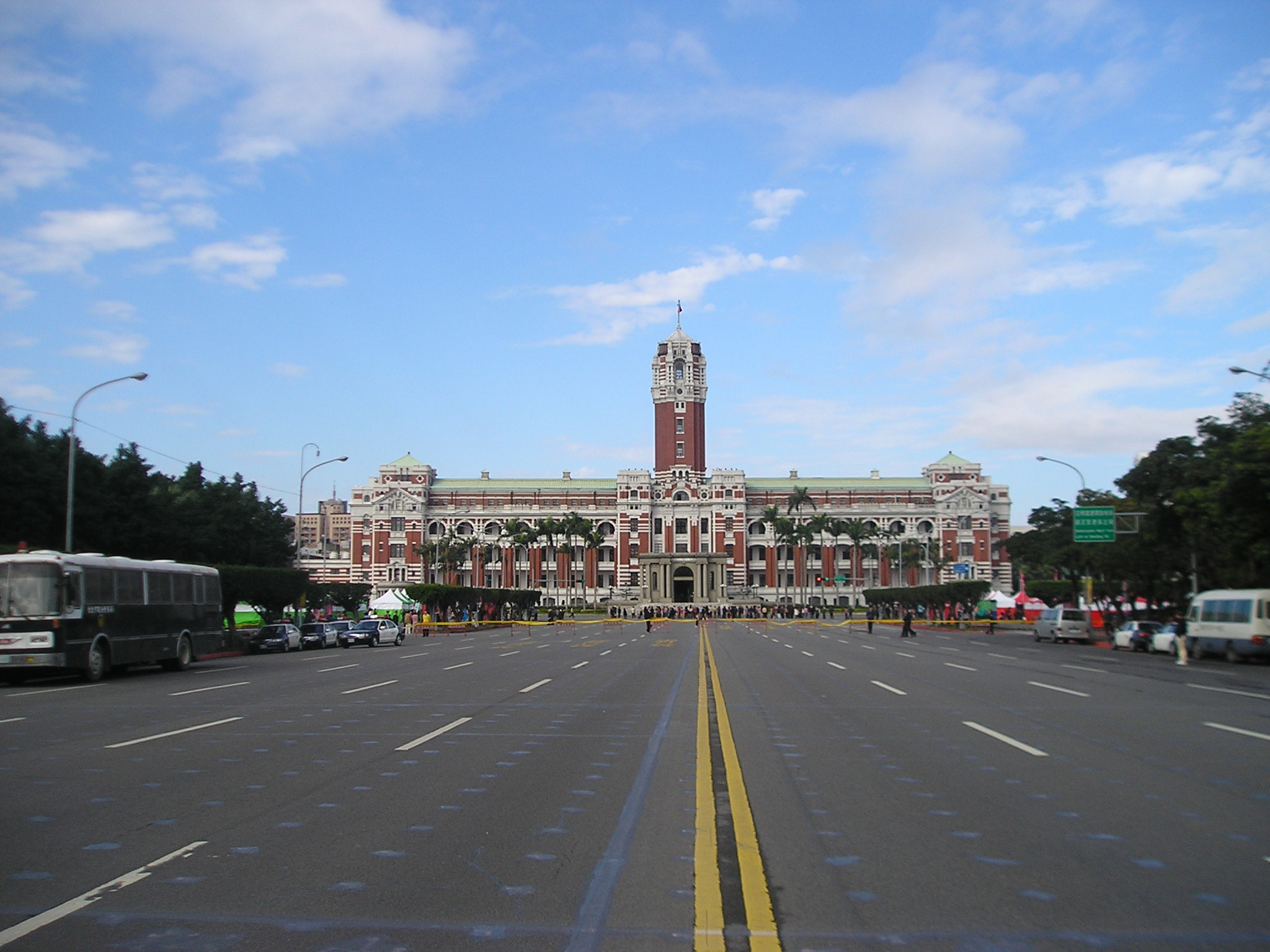
A view of Ketagalan Boulevard from the Gongyuan Road intersection towards the Presidential Office Building.

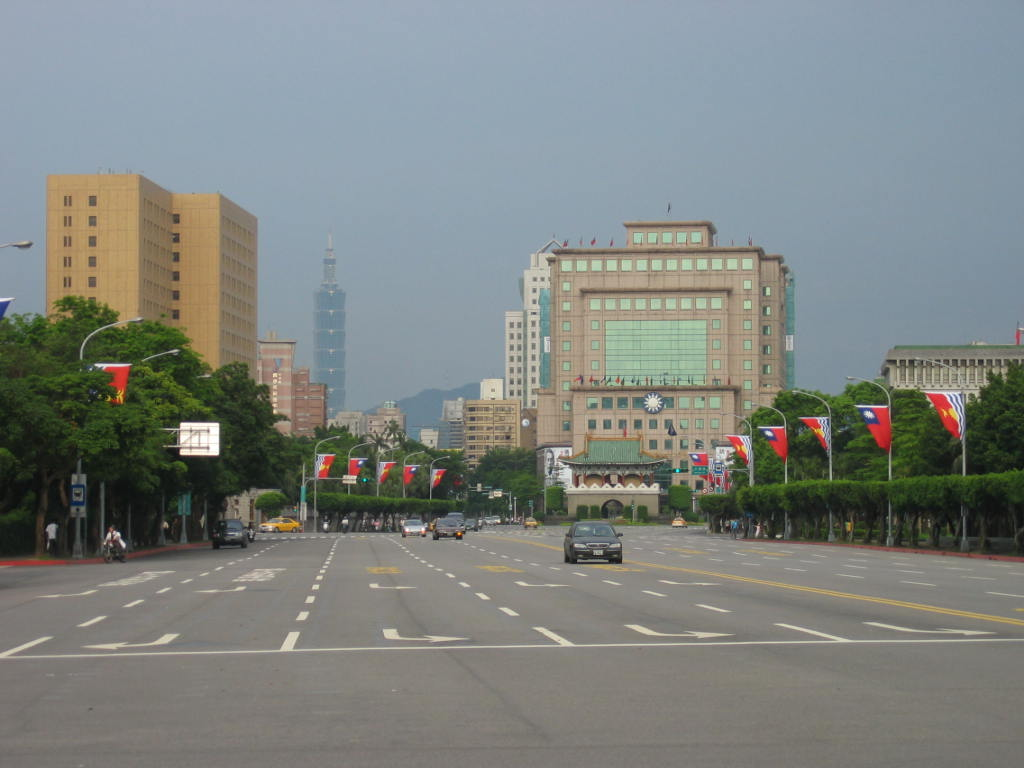
A view of Ketagalan Boulevard from the Presidential Office Building towards the East Gate (foreground): The prominent landmarks seen are the NTU Hospital (left), Taipei 101 (background), KMT former Headquarters (right), and ROC Foreign Ministry (far right). The route was lined with flags of the ROC and Kiribati during a state visit by President Anote Tong.

Ketagalan Boulevard (Chinese: 凱達格蘭大道; pinyin: Kǎidágélán Dàdào) is an arterial road in Zhongzheng District in Taipei, Taiwan, between the Presidential Office Building and the East Gate (東門). It is 400 meters (1,300 ft) long and has five lanes in each direction with no median.

== History ==
The former name of this street is Chieh-shou Road (介壽路; Jièshòu Lù); Chieh-shou (介壽; jièshòu) means "Long live Chiang Kai-shek". On May 19, 1989, a pro-democracy activist named Chan I-hua performed self-immolation to protest the blocking of the funeral procession of fellow activist Cheng Nan-jung. On 21 March 1996, when Chen Shui-bian was the mayor of Taipei, Chieh-shou Road was renamed Ketagalan Boulevard and the surrounding square was renamed Ketagalan Square in honor of the Ketagalan Taiwanese aborigines originally living in the Taipei area. However, Ketagalan Boulevard has been given other levels of political meaning and is a prominent site of political protest by opposing parties.

Back when there was a stern atmosphere in front of the Presidential Office Building, pedestrians had to pass by with their heads lowered. Motorcycles and bicycles were banned from Chieh-shou Road and a section of Chongqing South Road right in front of the Presidential Office Building. When Chieh-shou Road was renamed Ketagalan Boulevard, the traffic signs banning motorcycles and bicycles on Ketagalan Boulevard and Chongqing South Road were removed, reminiscent of "lifting martial law" (解嚴). When renaming the road, it was announced that there was no disrespect intended to former President Chiang Kai-shek.

Ketagalan Boulevard and the area surrounding the Presidential Office Building and East Gate is a popular location for mass political rallies. For example, after the 2004 presidential election, supporters of the Pan-Blue Coalition not satisfied with the result of the election occupied Ketagalan Boulevard, protesting and parading for an entire week.

In the wake of the renaming of the Chiang Kai-shek Memorial Hall to National Taiwan Democracy Memorial Hall (Chinese: 國立臺灣民主紀念館) by the DPP administration, Taipei Mayor Hau Lung-pin proposed to rename the section of Ketagalan Boulevard between the Presidential Office Building and Kungyuan Road "Anticorruption Democracy Square" (反貪腐民主廣場) after the 2006 protests. However, subsequent debate regarding this name change has not occurred since the renaming of the memorial hall.

In February 2017, the Indigenous Ketagalan Boulevard protest, surrounding the delineation of traditional lands, started on the Boulevard.

== Landmarks ==
Ketagalan Boulevard is 400 meters long. Along the road are three buildings, two parks and two parking lots. Among them are:

- Taipei Guest House
- Ministry of Foreign Affairs
- 228 Peace Memorial Park
- Jieshou Park dedicated to Lin Sen, President of the Republic of China from 1931 to 1943.

== See also ==
- List of roads in Taiwan
