= Cheng Nan-jung Liberty Museum =

Museum in Songshan, Taipei, Taiwan

- 鄭南榕自由紀念館
- Established: 1999
- Location: Songshan, Taipei, Taiwan
- Coordinates: 25°03′42″N 121°32′44″E
- Type: museum

Cheng Nan-jung Liberty Museum
- Traditional Chinese: 鄭南榕自由紀念館
Transcriptions
Standard Mandarin
- Hanyu Pinyin: Zhèngnánróng Zìyóu Jìniànguǎn

The Cheng Nan-jung Liberty Museum (traditional Chinese: 鄭南榕自由紀念館; simplified Chinese: 郑南榕自由纪念馆) is a museum in Songshan District, Taipei, Taiwan. The museum is dedicated to the pro-democracy activist Cheng Nan-jung.

== History ==
The museum was inaugurated in 1999, on Human Rights Day, in honor of Cheng Nan-jung's lifelong struggle for freedom. It was built on the site of Cheng Nan-jung's self-immolation on 7 April 1989, which was an act of protest against the government's curbing of freedom of speech.

== Exhibitions ==
Original manuscripts and objects belonging to Cheng Nan-jung are housed in the museum. There are also several copies of magazines from the Freedom Era.

== Transportation ==
The museum is accessible within walking distance northeast from Zhongshan Junior High School Station of Taipei Metro.

== See also ==
- List of museums in Taiwan
