= Jieshou Park =

Park in Zhongzheng, Taipei, Taiwan

- 介壽公園
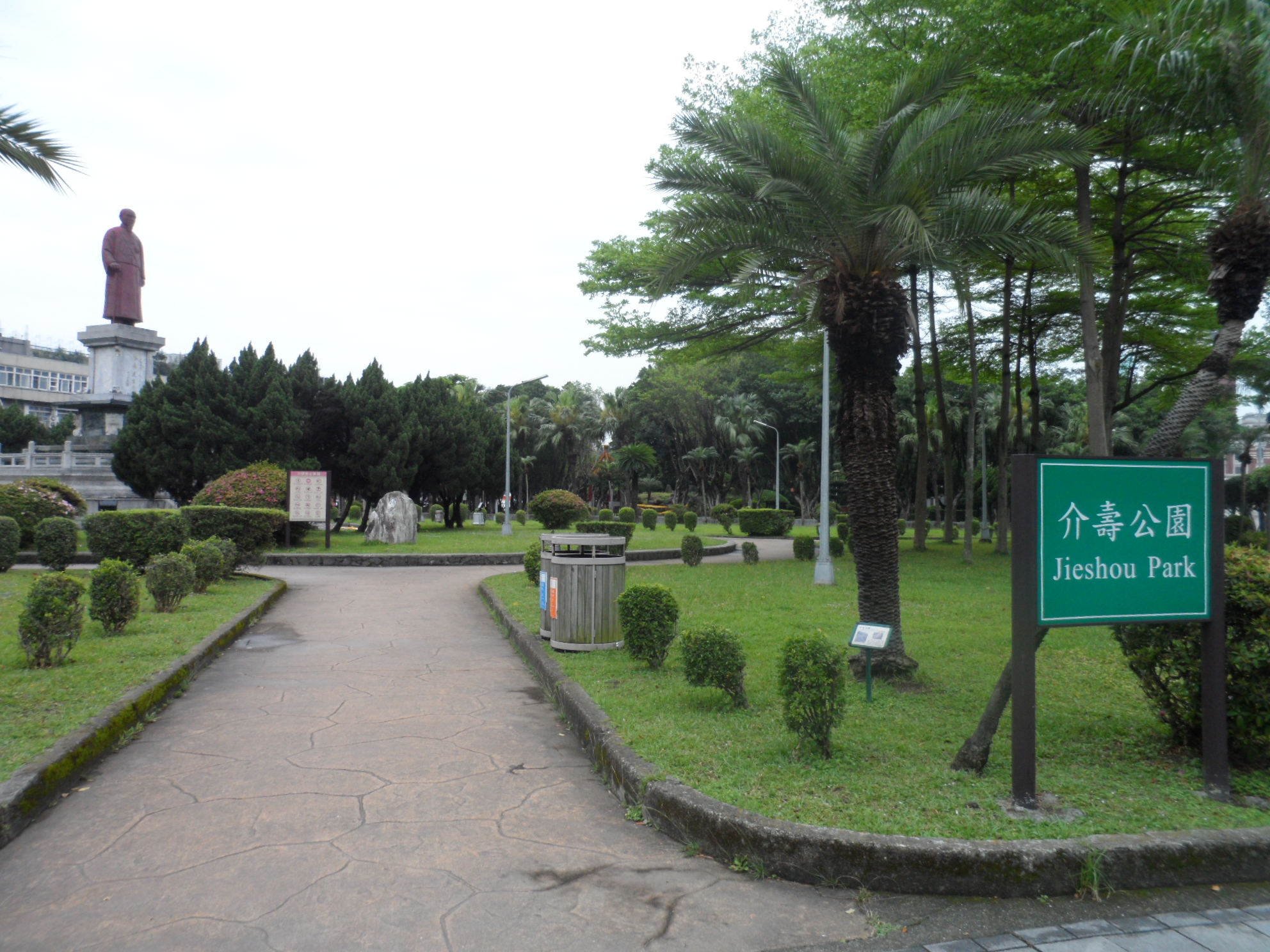
- Interactive map of Jieshou Park
- Type: Park
- Location: Ketagalan Boulevard, Zhongzheng District, Taipei, Taiwan
- Coordinates: 25.039231°N 121.514481°E
- Opening: 1964

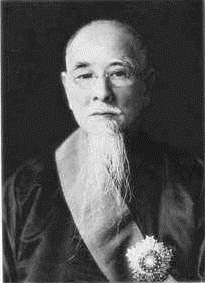
Lin Sen

Jieshou Park (traditional Chinese: 介壽公園; simplified Chinese: 介寿公园; pinyin: Jièshòu Gōngyuán) is an urban type park in Zhongzheng District, Taipei, Taiwan.

== Features ==
The park features the statue of Lin Sen, the former President of the Republic of China. And in the west side of the park, there is a Memorial to the Victims of the White Terror.

== History ==
The site of Jieshou Park was formerly San-Jun basketball court (三軍球場) and a sports venue of Taipei First Girls' High School. The park opened to the public in 1964. What is now Ketagalan Boulevard, running beside the park, was then named Jieshou Road. The name of the park refers to Chiang Kai-shek's name in Mandarin. When the park opened to the public, the city held a chrysanthemum exhibition for one week.

In 1968, authorities decided to erect a statue of Lin Sen, former President of the Republic of China, in Jieshou park in celebration of the hundredth anniversary of his birth. They used the pedestal of the statue of Governor-General of Taiwan Kabayama Sukenori.

On March 27, 2008, Taiwan Government set up a monument of Memorial to the Victims of the White Terror in northwest corner of Jieshou park.

== Gallery ==
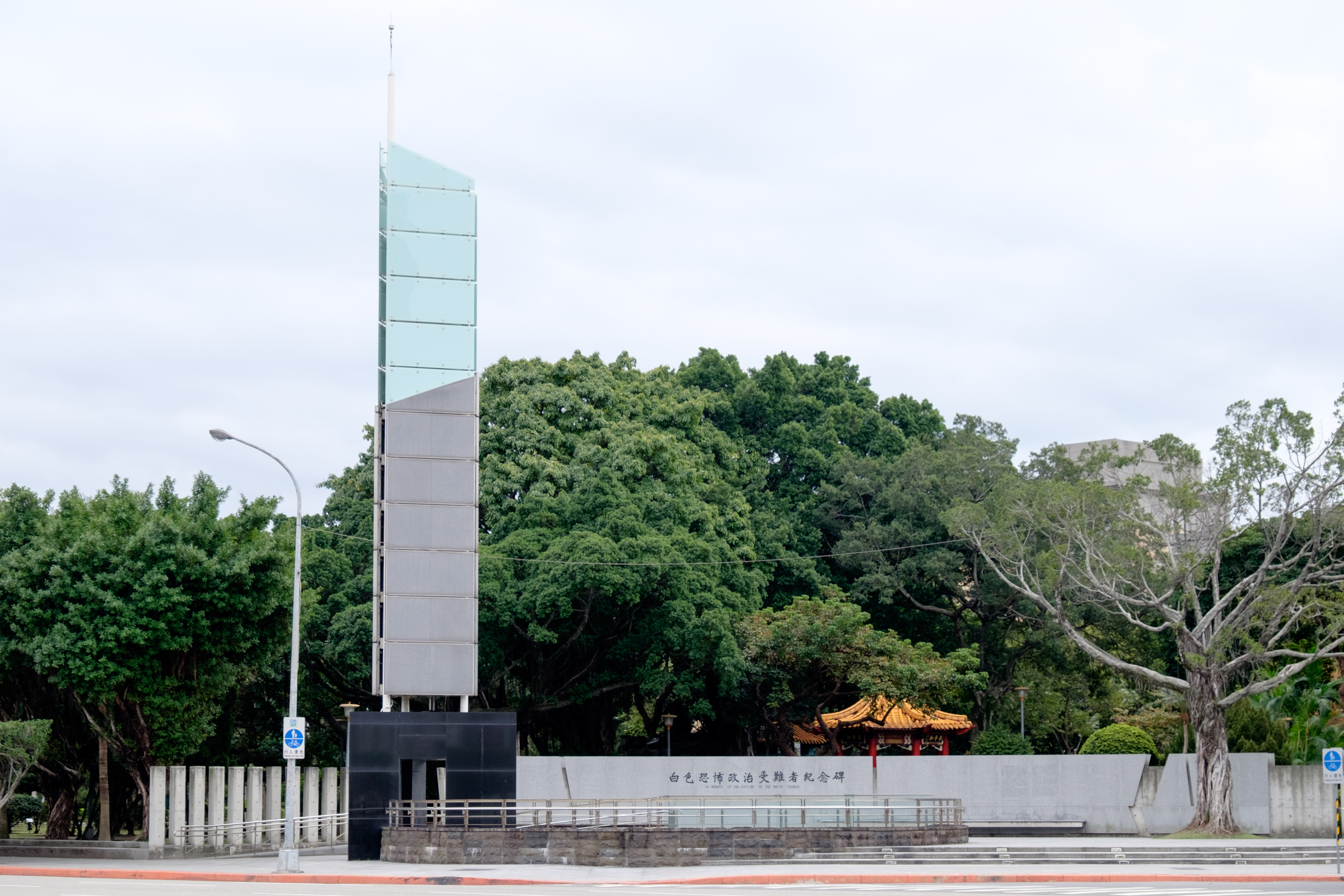
Front View of Memorial to the Victims of the White Terror

Memorial to the Victims of the White Terror

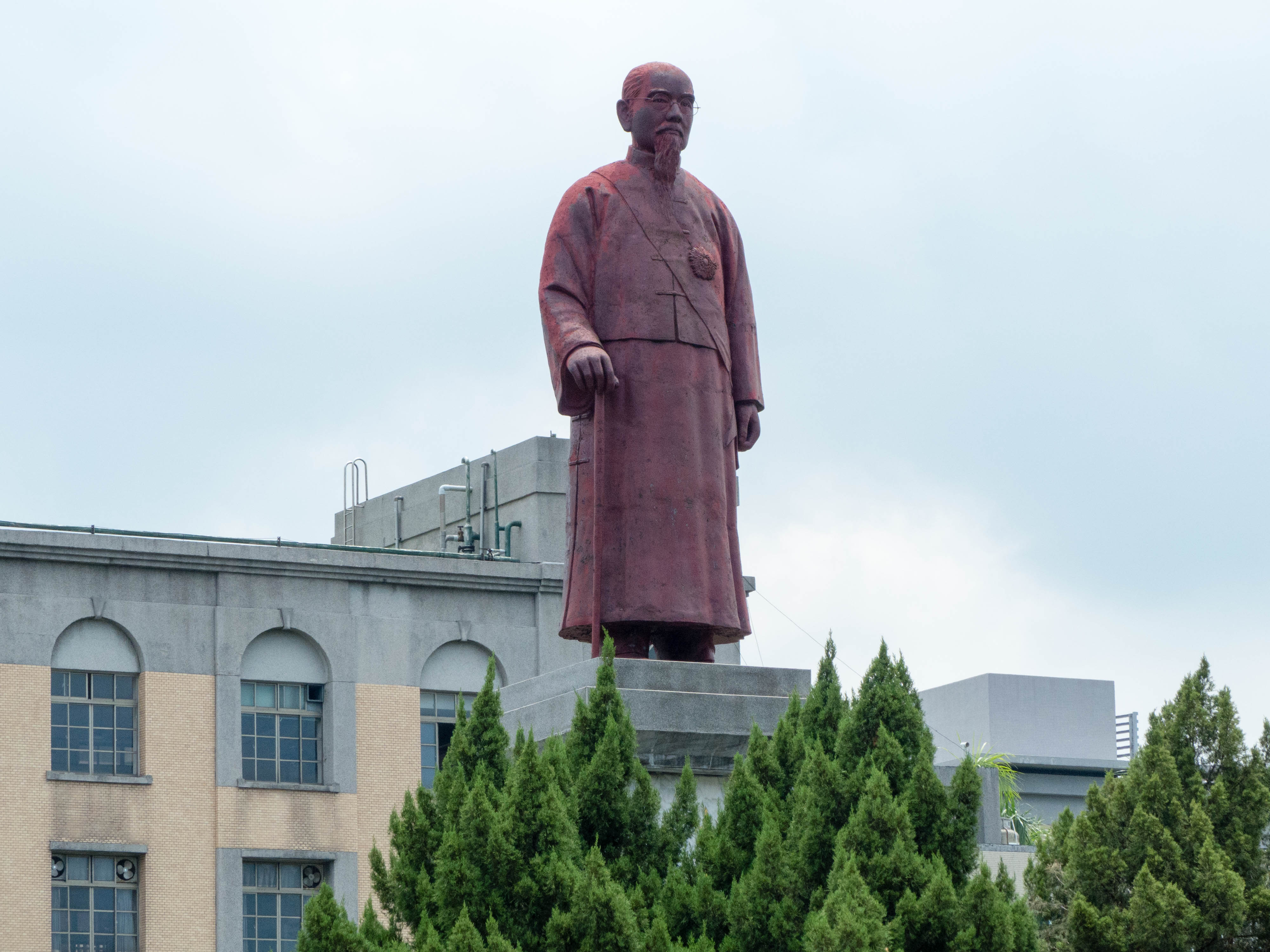
Statue of Lin Sen in Jieshou Park

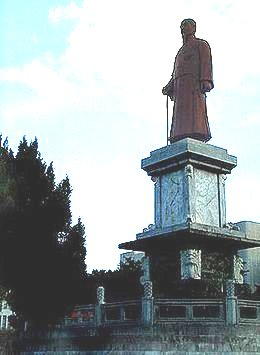
Statue of Lin Sen in Jieshou Park

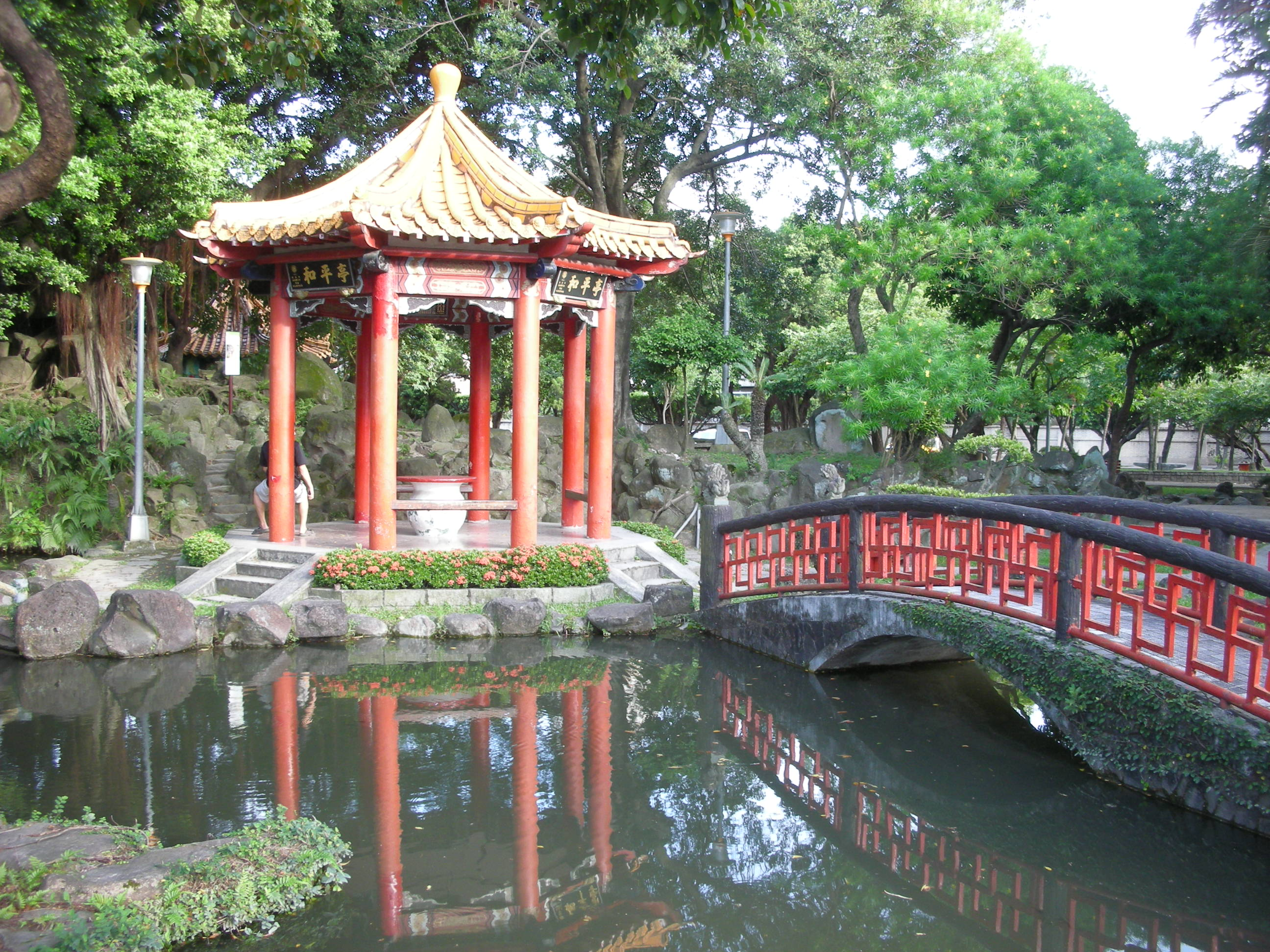
Peace Shelter in Jieshou Park

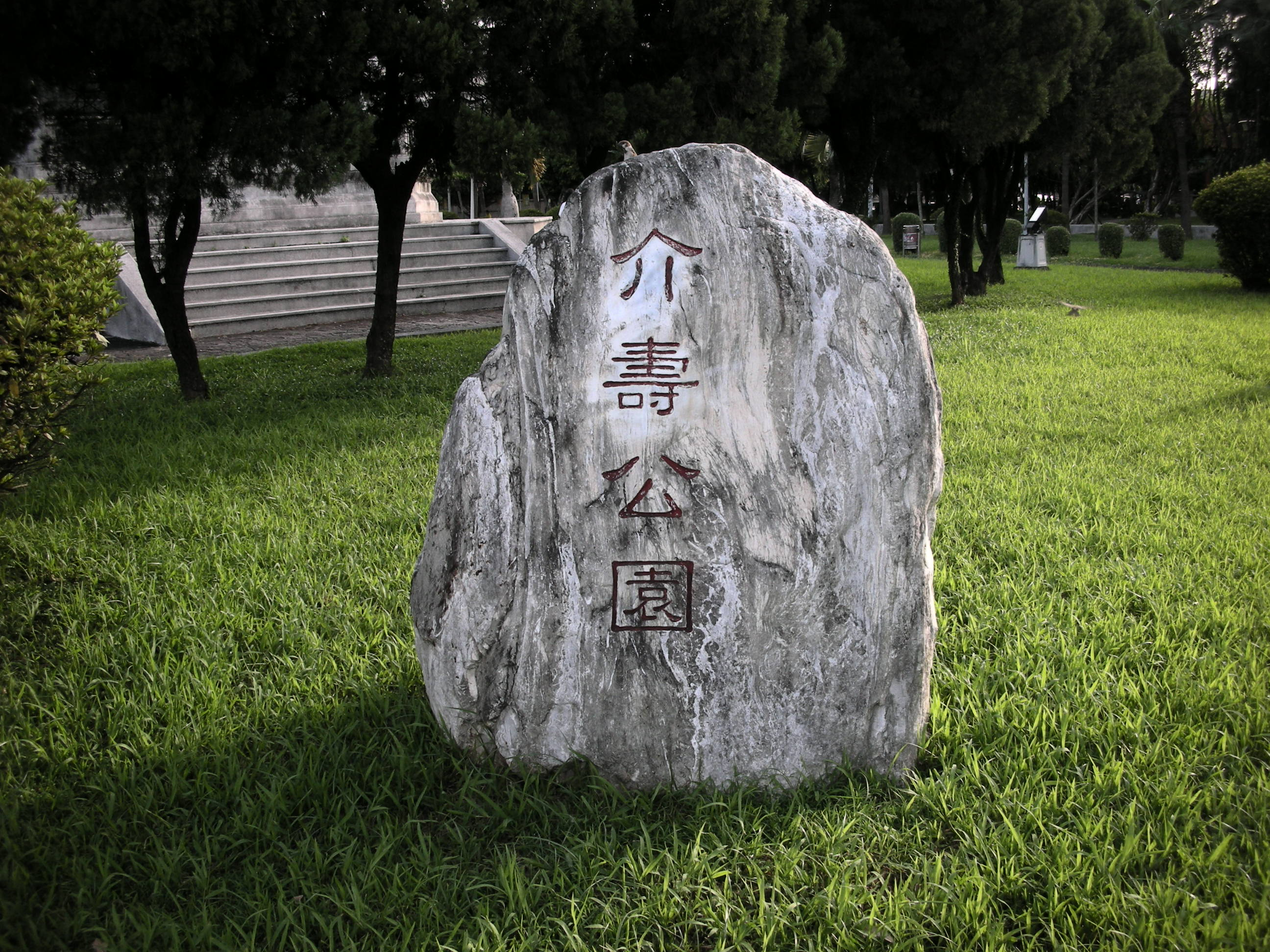
Chinese garden stone in Jieshou Park

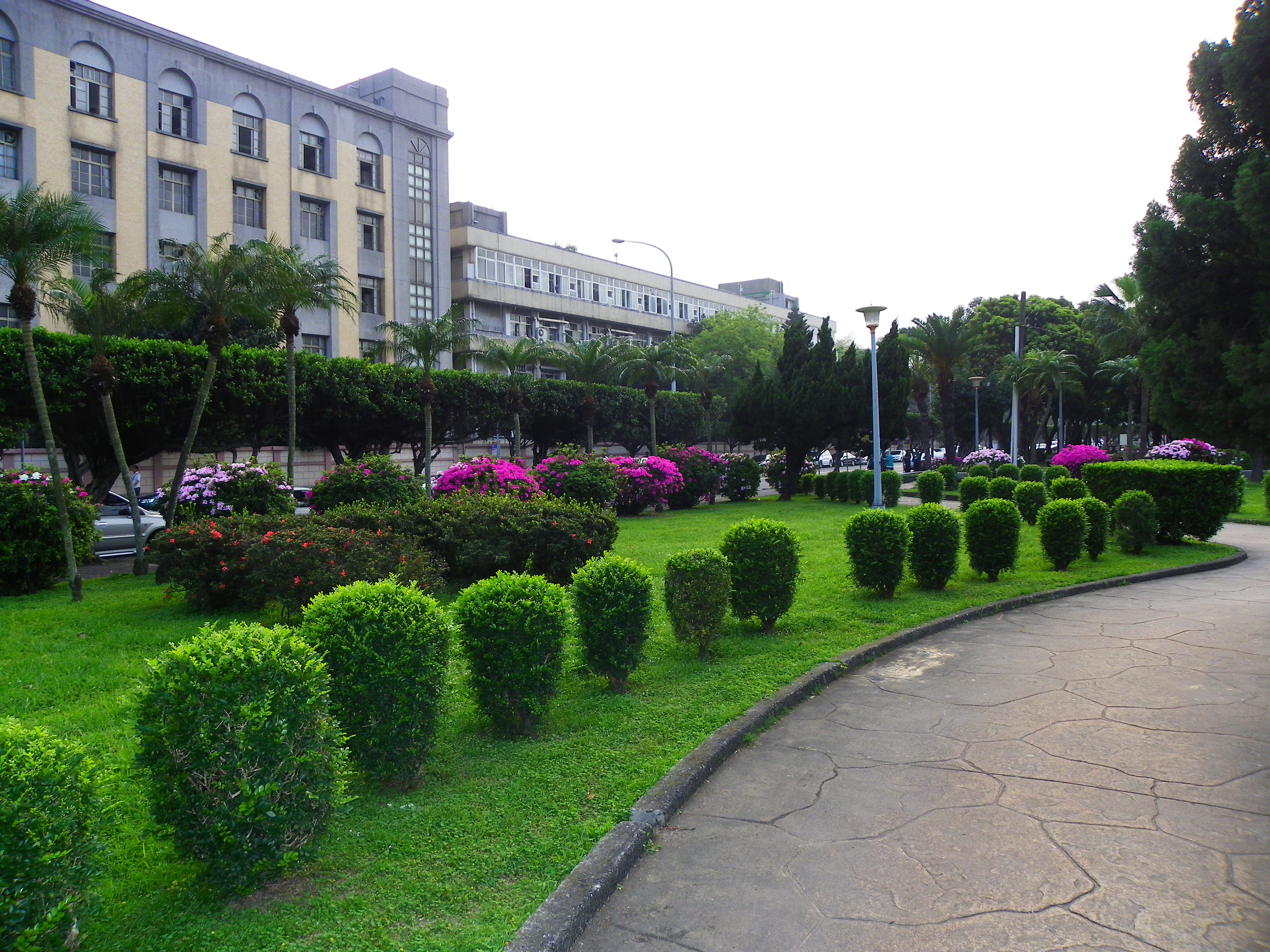
Jieshou Park and Taipei First Girls' High School in the distance

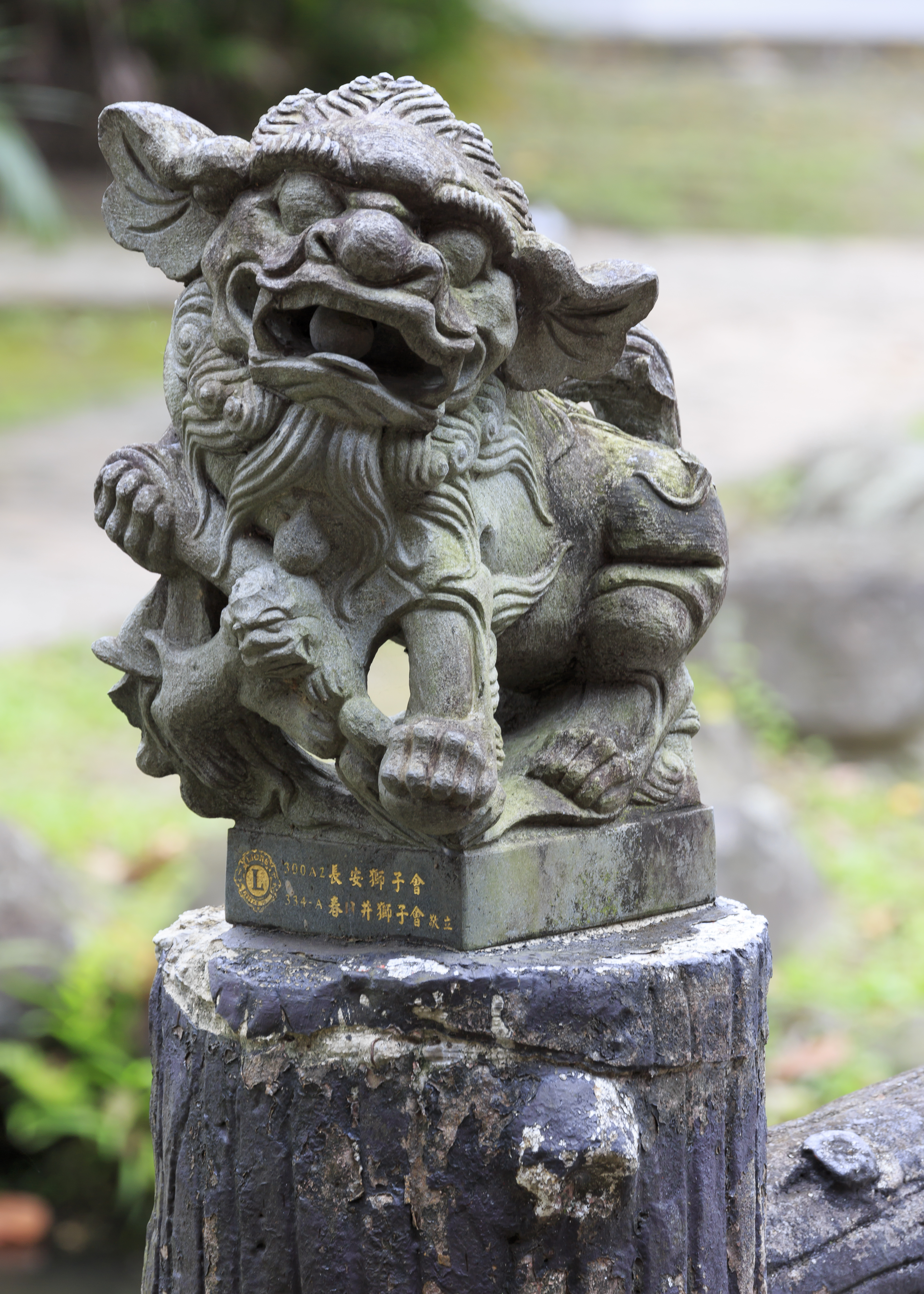
Stone Lion statue in Jieshou Park

== Transportation ==
The park is within walking distance south of NTU Hospital Station of Taipei Metro.

== See also ==
- List of parks in Taiwan
- List of tourist attractions in Taiwan
