= Beyond Beauty: Taiwan from Above =

- Taiwan theatrical poster of Beyond Beauty
- Directed by: Chi Po-lin
- Written by: Tsui Chi-chuan
- Produced by: Hou Hsiao-hsien
- Narrated by: Wu Nien-jen
- Cinematography: Chi Po-lin
- Edited by: Kuo Yu-ning; Chen Hsiao-Tong
- Music by: Ricky Ho; Nolay Piho
- Production companies: Taiwan Aerial Imaging, Inc.
- Distributed by: Activator Marketing
- Release date: November 1, 2013 (Taiwan)
- Running time: 93 minutes
- Country: Taiwan
- Language: Mandarin
- Budget: NT$90 million

Beyond Beauty: Taiwan from Above (Chinese: 看見台灣) is a 2013 documentary film which documents Taiwan completely in aerial photography to underscore the need for environmental reforms. It is directed by aerial photographer Chi Po-lin and produced by Hou Hsiao-hsien, with narration by Wu Nien-jen. The music is composed by Ricky Ho, with three songs written and performed by Nolay Piho (Lin Ching-tai). The film opened on November 1, 2013 at 44 theaters in Taiwan, with Chinese and English subtitles. The film broke the Taiwan box office records for the largest opening weekend and the highest total gross of a locally produced documentary. The film was nominated for Best Documentary and Best Original Film Score at the 50th Golden Horse Awards, winning the best documentary category.
