= Gunnel Cederlöf =

Gunnel Cederlöf (born 1960) is professor of history at Linnaeus University and a working member of The Royal Swedish Academy of Letters, History and Antiquities. She was previously professor in the Department of History at Uppsala University.

== Education ==
Cederlöf studied history at Uppsala University, where she obtained a BA in 1990 and a PhD in 1997. Her doctoral thesis examined bonded labour, caste and class relations in South India's agrarian economy in the 20th century. It was published as Bonds Lost: Subordination, Conflict and Mobilisation in Rural South India c. 1900-1970 in 1997 by Manohar Publishers and, again, in 2020 by Oxford University Press.

== Academic career ==
Cederlöf was appointed to professor at Uppsala University in 2011, where she also served as director of the Forum for Advanced Studies in Arts, Languages, and Theology (2006–08). She was a visiting professor and taught in the Division of History of Science, Technology and Environment at KTH Royal Institute of Technology (2014–16). She currently serves as Professor of History in the Centre for Concurrencies in Colonial and Postcolonial Studies and the Department of Cultural Sciences at the Linnaeus University.

Cederlöf has been a visiting researcher at SCAS, Swedish Collegium for Advanced Study (2000), Oxford University (2000–01), Jawaharlal Nehru University (2010), Calcutta University (2004–13), and at Shiv Nadar University, India (2014–19).

In 2017, she was appointed to working member of The Royal Swedish Academy of Letters, History and Antiquities in the historical and antiquarian class.

== Scholarship ==
Cederlöf's research is situated in environmental history, legal history, and colonial history. Her research focuses on early-modern and modern India and the British Empire. Her recent research seeks to establish the impact of environment, climate, and mobility on the formative processes of subjecthood and of British colonial governing institutions on the North-eastern Frontiers.

She is a known advocate for the internationalization of Swedish higher-education and academia. She was awarded Uppsala University's Pedagogical Prize in 2010 ‘For the internationalization of education’. She served as Deputy Chair of The Swedish Foundation for International Cooperation in Research and Higher Education (STINT) in 2013–19.

== Books ==
- Cederlöf, G. and Mahesh Rangarajan (eds.). 2018. At Nature’s Edge: The Global Present and Long-term History. New Delhi: Oxford University Press.
- Cederlöf, G. and Sanjukta Das Gupta (eds.). 2017. Subjects, Citizens and Law: Colonial and Independent India. Routledge, New Delhi and London.
- Cederlöf, G. 2014. Founding and Empire on India’s North-Eastern Frontiers, 1790-1840: Climate, Commerce, Polity. Oxford University Press, New Delhi.
- Cederlöf G. 2019 (2008). Landscapes and the Law: Environmental Politics, Regional Histories, and Contests over Nature. New Delhi: Permanent Black (2008) and Oxford University Press (2019).
- Cederlöf, G. and K. Sivaramakrishnan (eds.). 2014 (2006). Ecological Nationalisms: Nature, Livelihoods and Identities in South Asia. 1st and 2nd editions with New Delhi: Permanent Black and Seattle: University of Washington Press.
- Cederlöf G. 2020 (1997). Bonds Lost: Subordination, Conflict and Mobilisation in Rural South India c. 1900-1970. Oxford University Press, and Manhoar Publishers, New Delhi.
