= Royal Brisbane International College =

Postsecondary school in Australia

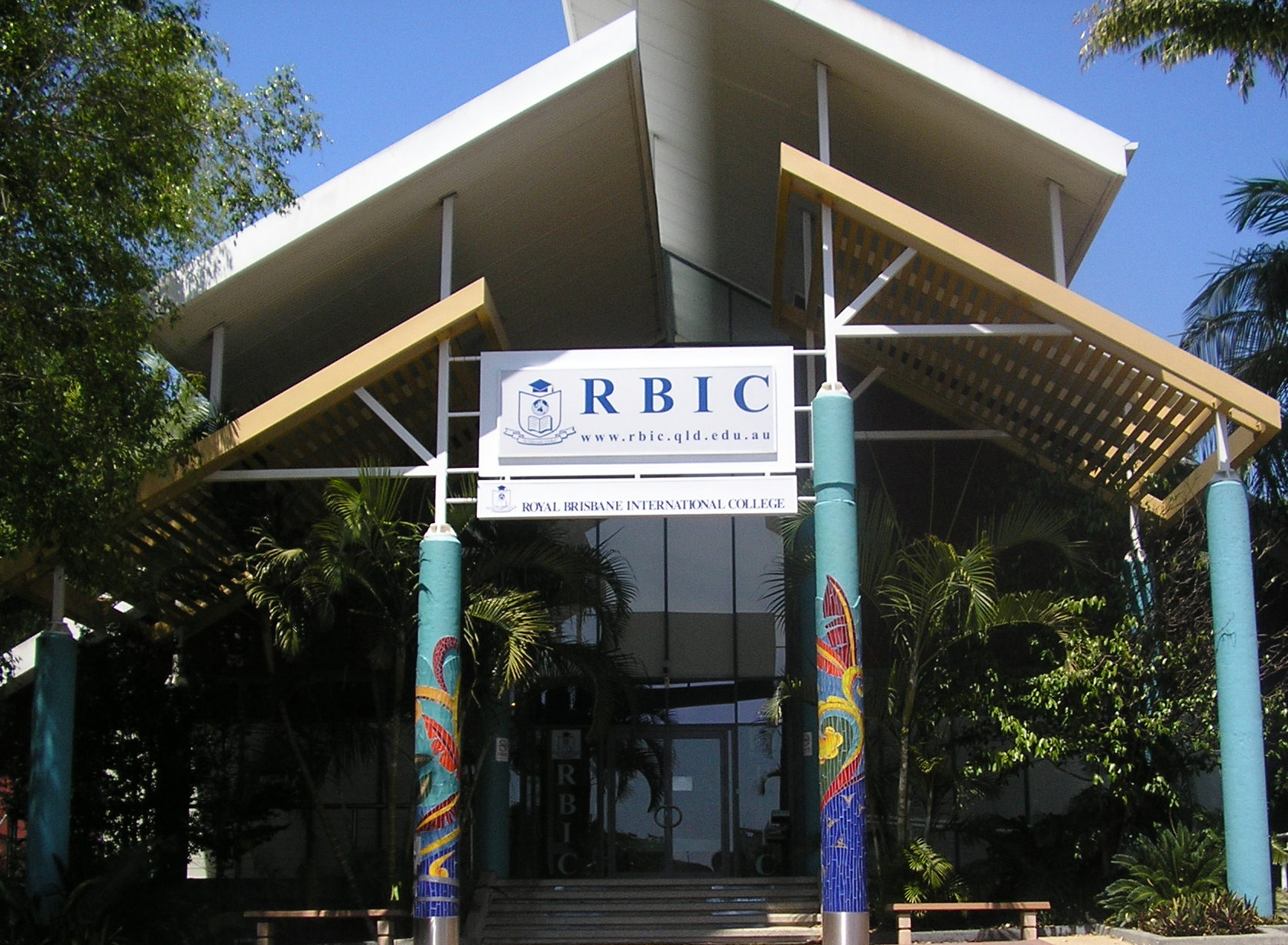
Royal Brisbane Institute of Technology

The Royal Brisbane Institute of Technology (or RBIT) has taught over 7,500 international students from 42 different countries and has a global network and several articulation partnerships. RBIT recently moved to a new campus located within Brisbane's CBD on Level 1, 99 Creek St, 4000. RBIT has also expanded to a new Hong Kong campus and has several study tours a year with sister schools in Taiwan & Korea. It is accredited with National Recognised Training and NEAS Australia.

RBIT offers courses ranging from Certificate II to Advanced Diploma's and VGC/VGD's in the following subjects:

- Business Administration
- Transport & Logistics
- Hospitality
- Tourism
- Aged Care/Community Services
