= Oil Free Wellington =

New Zealand protest group

Oil Free Wellington is a protest group which was formed in Wellington, New Zealand, in 2012. It exists to oppose deep sea oil drilling off the coast of New Zealand's capital city, Wellington. It also works in support of other groups opposing fossil fuel exploration around New Zealand.

== Oil exploration in New Zealand ==
Oil exploration permits are given out at annual Block Offers by a branch of the New Zealand government. These annual events have been the focus of much protest organized by groups around the country.

The New Zealand Government has been strongly encouraging oil and gas exploration in the country.

Permits for exploration and drilling have been given to a wide variety of companies which include, Anadarko, Statoil, and Chevron. The Government Minister, Simon Bridges, has said that he is taking the environmental risks seriously and "will not allow cowboys" in New Zealand waters.

== Protest actions ==
Oil Free Wellington has led and been involved in many protest actions around Wellington and New Zealand.

- In September 2013 Oil Free Wellington led a protest march and blockade of the annual Petroleum Summit in Wellington.
- In January 2014 members of the group swam to an oil surveying ship which was berthed in Wellington harbour and attached a banner reading "oil free seas." Later in the year the same surveying boat was prevented from leaving, and much harbour traffic was prevented from entering the harbour, when protesters from Kaikōura swam and body boarded into the path of the surveying boat.
- In January 2014 Oil Free Wellington led a protest march to the offices of oil company Anadarko in Wellington to deliver a "trespass notice" which had been signed by Wellington city locals.
- In June 2014 members of the group rigged a banner outside the venue hosting the National Party's campaign conference. The National government had just opened protected sea areas to oil exploration potentially putting at risk the critically endangered Maui's Dolphin. The banner addressed to government minister Simon Bridges read, "Hey Simon, extinction is forever!"
- In October 2014 members scaled a building in Wellington to drop a "stop deep sea oil" banner protesting the Norwegian owned company Statoil which has permits for oil exploration in New Zealand waters. This was accompanied by events around the country.
- In December 2015 the group hosted protests at Wellington's waterfront expressing their opposition to oil exploration on the day the climate change talks in Paris ended. This featured dozens of kayaks, waka (a Māori canoe) and yachts, as well as hundreds of protesters on shore.
