= Chi Po-lin =

Taiwanese documentary filmmaker, photographer and environmentalist (1964–2017)

- 齊柏林
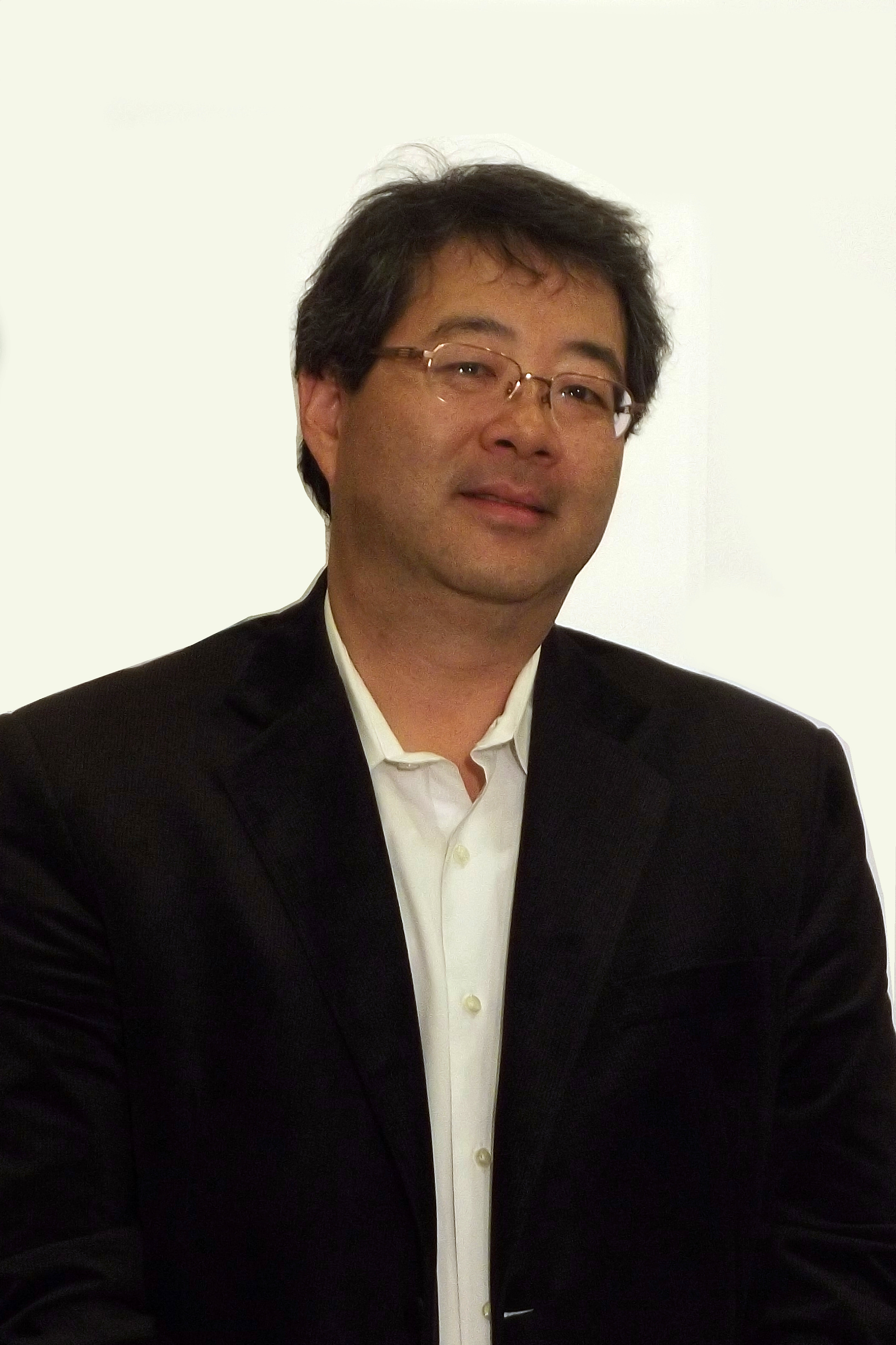
- Chi in 2015
- Born: December 27, 1964; Taipei, Taiwan
- Died: June 10, 2017 (aged 52); Fengbin, Hualien, Taiwan
- Education: Lunghwa University of Science and Technology
- Occupations: Documentary director, photographer, cinematographer
- Years active: 1997–2017
- Children: 2

Chinese name
- Traditional Chinese: 齊柏林 (Note: His name literally means "zeppelin". However, his father had no knowledge about the airship when he gave him the name and this was just a result of coincidence.)
- Simplified Chinese: 齐柏林
Transcriptions
Standard Mandarin
- Hanyu Pinyin: Qí Bólín
- Wade–Giles: Chi^{2} Po^{2}-lin^{2}
- Musical career
- Also known as: Po-lin Chi

Chi Po-lin (Chinese: 齊柏林; 27 December 1964 – 10 June 2017) was a Taiwanese documentary filmmaker, photographer and environmentalist, best known for his 2013 film Beyond Beauty: Taiwan from Above, which won Best Documentary at the 2013 Golden Horse Awards.

On 10 June 2017, Chi along with his assistant Chen Kuan-chi and pilot Chang Chi-kuang died in a helicopter crash in a mountainous area in Hualien County's Fengbin Township. The group was shooting footage for the sequel to Beyond Beauty: Taiwan from Above, which was scheduled for release in 2019. A memorial service was held in Taipei on 14 July 2017.

== Personal life ==
Chi was married and had a son and a daughter.

== Filmography ==
Year	English title	Mandarin title	Role	Notes
2012	Taiwan from the Air	鳥目台灣	Director, cinematographer	Short film
2013	Beyond Beauty: Taiwan from Above	看見台灣	Director, cinematographer	
2014	Taichung - The Heart Of Taiwan	台中心動	Director, cinematographer	Short film
2019	Beyond Beauty II	看見台灣II	Director, cinematographer	Sequel to Beyond Beauty: Taiwan from Above

== Published works ==
- Chi, Po-lin, Yeh, Huan-hui (1997). Images of the Northern Taiwan Second Freeway : Capturing the Feeling of Nature and the Earth. Taipei: MOTC. ISBN 9570201266.
- Chi, Po-lin (2001). Tai wan fei lan. Taipei: Choice Development, Inc. (zh:秋雨文化 pinyin: Qiū yǔ wén huà). ISBN 986-7680-06-5.
- Chi, Po-lin (2004). Our Land Our Story. Taipei: Choice Development, Inc. ISBN 986-7680-68-5.
- Chi, Po-lin (2012). Cong kong zhong kan tai wan : qi bo lin kong zhong she ying ji. Taipei: Owl Publishing House. ISBN 978-986-262-110-3.
- Chi, Po-lin (2013). Wo di xin, wo di yan, kan jian tai wan: qi bo lin kong pai 20 nian di jian chi yu shen qing. Taipei: Booklife. ISBN 9789861334691.
- Chi, Po-lin (2015). Beyond Beauty : Taiwan from Above. Taipei: Above Taiwan. ISBN 978-986-92467-0-5.

== Awards and nominations ==
Year	Award	Category	Nominated work	Result
2003	Keep Walking Fund Project	Grand Prize	—N/a	Won
2012	Xue Xue Awards	Special Contribution Award	—N/a	Won
2013	50th Golden Horse Awards	Best Documentary	Beyond Beauty: Taiwan from Above	Won
2014	Dunxu High School of Industry and Commerce	Outstanding Alumni Award	—N/a	Honored
2014	Lunghwa University of Science and Technology	Outstanding Alumni Award	—N/a	Honored

== Legacy ==
Asteroid 281068 Chipolin, discovered by Taiwanese astronomers Hung-Chin Lin and Ye Quan-Zhi in 2006, was named in his memory. The official naming citation was published by the Minor Planet Center on 4 November 2017 (M.P.C. 107122).

In March 2018, Chunghwa Post announced that still images from the sequel to Beyond Beauty would be released as stamp designs.

In August 2018, a species of true crab described from specimens collected in Kaohsiung, Taiwan, was named Neorhynchoplax chipolini in memory of Chi for his "immense contribution to environmental protection in Taiwan".

In April 2019, the Chi Po-lin Space dedicated to Chi opened in Tamsui.

In 2025, the first satellite in the earth observation constellation Formosat-8 was named after him.

== See also ==
- Taiwanese art
