= Cheng Nan-jung =

Taiwanese publisher and activist (1947–1989)

- 鄭南榕
- Cheng, c.1980s
- Born: 12 September 1947; Taipei, Taiwan
- Died: 7 April 1989 (aged 41); Taipei, Taiwan
- Cause of death: Burns from self-immolation
- Education: National Cheng Kung University; Fu Jen Catholic University; National Taiwan University
- Occupations: publisher, democracy activist
- Known for: Self-immolation, Taiwan independence
- Spouse: Yeh Chu-lan

Cheng Nan-jung (Chinese: 鄭南榕; pinyin: Zhèng Nánróng; Pe̍h-ōe-jī: Tēⁿ Lâm-iông; 12 September 1947 – 7 April 1989), nicknamed Nylon Deng, was a Taiwanese publisher and pro-democracy activist. He was the founder of the Freedom Era Weekly. He is most known internationally for setting himself on fire in support of freedom of speech.

== Background and career ==
Cheng's father was a Fuzhou immigrant in Taiwan under Japanese rule and his mother was from Keelung, Taiwan. His parents had four sons. Cheng was born in the year of the February 28 Incident. On his first job-seeking résumé, Cheng Nan-jung wrote: "I was born the year of the February 28 Incident, and this incident has tormented me throughout my life.... Only because we were protected by our neighbors were we Waishengrens safe from the wave of retaliation from the Taiwanese." He wrote that his experience growing up in the White Terror drove his commitment to Taiwan independence.

Cheng studied engineering at Taiwan Provincial Cheng Kung University, and philosophy at Fu Jen Catholic University and National Taiwan University. He refused to take the classes on Sun Yat-sen Thought (國父思想), which did not become optional until 2006, and handed back his National Taiwan University graduation certificate.

In March 1984, he founded Freedom Era Weekly and declared that "[it was] fighting for 100 percent freedom of speech." Cheng Nan-jung had registered 18 different magazines as "spare tires" for use when the Kuomintang banned the magazine and suspended publication. He said, "I'm not scared of arrest nor of being killed, basically, I'll fight them to the very end." The magazine was banned several times by the authorities but continued to be printed and distributed.

== Immolation and aftermath ==
In 1989, Cheng was charged with insurrection for printing a proposal for a constitution for the Republic of Taiwan. An arrest warrant was issued. He refused to appear in court. When the police attempted to break into his office in order to arrest him on April 7, he committed suicide by self-immolation. He set fire to his office and died in the blaze. His immolation protest against the Kuomintang was covered by Formosa Television several years later.

At Cheng's funeral on May 19, another Taiwanese pro-democracy activist, Chan I-hua, also immolated himself when the funeral procession was blocked by police.

Cheng's widow, Yeh Chu-lan, held senior positions in the Democratic Progressive Party administration between 2000 and 2005. Former Vice Premier, she was acting mayor of Kaohsiung from July 2005 to December 2006. In 2007 she was mentioned as a possible running mate for Frank Hsieh in the 2008 Taiwan Presidential Election, but in the end Hsieh picked Su Tseng-chang.

In 1999, a museum dedicated to Cheng called the Cheng Nan-jung Liberty Museum was opened in Taipei. The museum rests on the venue where Cheng immolated himself. On 22 December 2016, the Executive Yuan announced that 7 April every year would become Freedom of Expression Day to commemorate his death.

In November 2013, the National Cheng Kung University renowned for its political sciences studies held a vote to choose the name for a new square. Cheng's name won the vote, but the university chief secretary preferred to ignore the vote outcome.

== See also ==
- List of political self-immolations
- Altruistic suicide

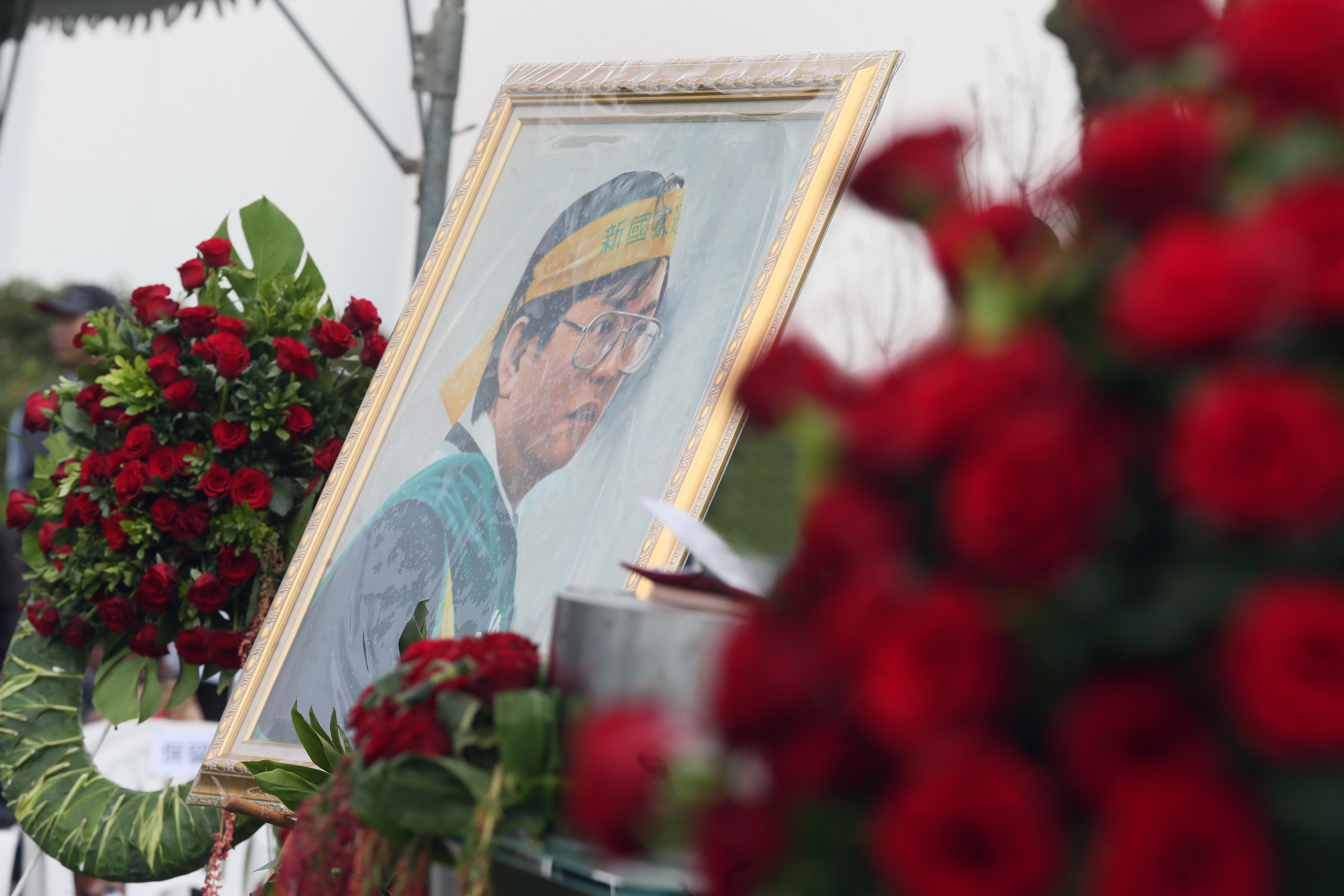
a portrait of Cheng at his 28th Anniversary Memorial Service, held at the Presidential Office Building, Taipei
