= Xizhi (disambiguation) =

Xizhi (汐止) is a district in New Taipei City, Taiwan.

Xizhi may also refer to:

- Xizhi line, branch line of Minsheng–Xizhi line, Taipei Metro
- Xizhi railway station, station of the Taiwan Railways
- Wang Xizhi (303–361), Chinese calligrapher, politician, general and writer
- Fang Xiaoru (1357–1402), courtesy name Xizhi (希直), Chinese politician and Confucian scholar of the Ming dynasty
- Li Lin (1923–2003), born name Li Xizhi (李熙芝), Chinese physicist
- Yao Qisheng (1624–1683), courtesy name Xizhi (熙止), Chinese regional official, diplomat, and statesman

== See also ==
- Xizhimen station
