= Wudu (disambiguation) =

Wuḍūʾ is the Islamic procedure for cleansing parts of the body, a type of ritual purification, or ablution.

Wudu may also refer to:

- Wudu (武都), one of the five realms of Chouchi
- Wudu Dam, a dam in Sichuan Province, China
- Wudu language, a Togo language
- Wudu, Longnan, Gansu province, China
- Wudu railway station, a railway station on the Taiwan Railways Administration West Coast line
- Wudu River, a tributary of the Beipan River in Panzhou, Guizhou, China
- Melknat Wudu (born 2005), an Ethiopian track and field and cross-country runner
- Üdü Ẁüdü, the sixth studio album by French rock band Magma
