= Baifu =

Baifu may refer to:

- Baifu railway station, a railway station on the Taiwan Railways Administration West Coast line
- Baifu Village (百福里), Nangang District, Taipei, Taiwan
- Baifu/Bofu Village (百福里), Qidu District, Keelung, Taiwan
- Baifu Village (白浮村), Machikou, Changping, Beijing
- Baifu Village (百福村), Xiaoyan, Anhua, Hunan Province, China

== See also ==
- Momofuku Ando (Japanese: 安藤 百福, 1910–2007), born Go Pek-Hok (Chinese: 吳百福; Pe̍h-ōe-jī: Gô͘ Pek-hok), an inventor and businessman
