= Qidu =

Qidu may refer to:

- Qidu District, Keelung, Taiwan
- Qidu railway station, a railway station on the Taiwan Railways Administration West Coast line
- Qidu Subdistrict (七都街道), Lucheng, Wenzhou, Zhejiang Province, China
- Qidu Town (七都镇), Jiaocheng, Ningde, Fujian Province, China
- Qidu Town (七都镇), Shitai County, Anhui Province, China
- Qidu Town (七都镇), Wujiang, Suzhou, Jiangsu Province, China
- Qidu Town (齐都镇), Linzi, Zibo, Shandong Province, China
- Qidu Township (七都乡), Yongfeng County, Jiangxi Province, China
- Qidu Village (七渡村), Shidu, Beijing, China
