= Xizhi Gongbei Temple =

Taoist temple in Xizhi New Taipei, Taiwan

- 汐止拱北殿
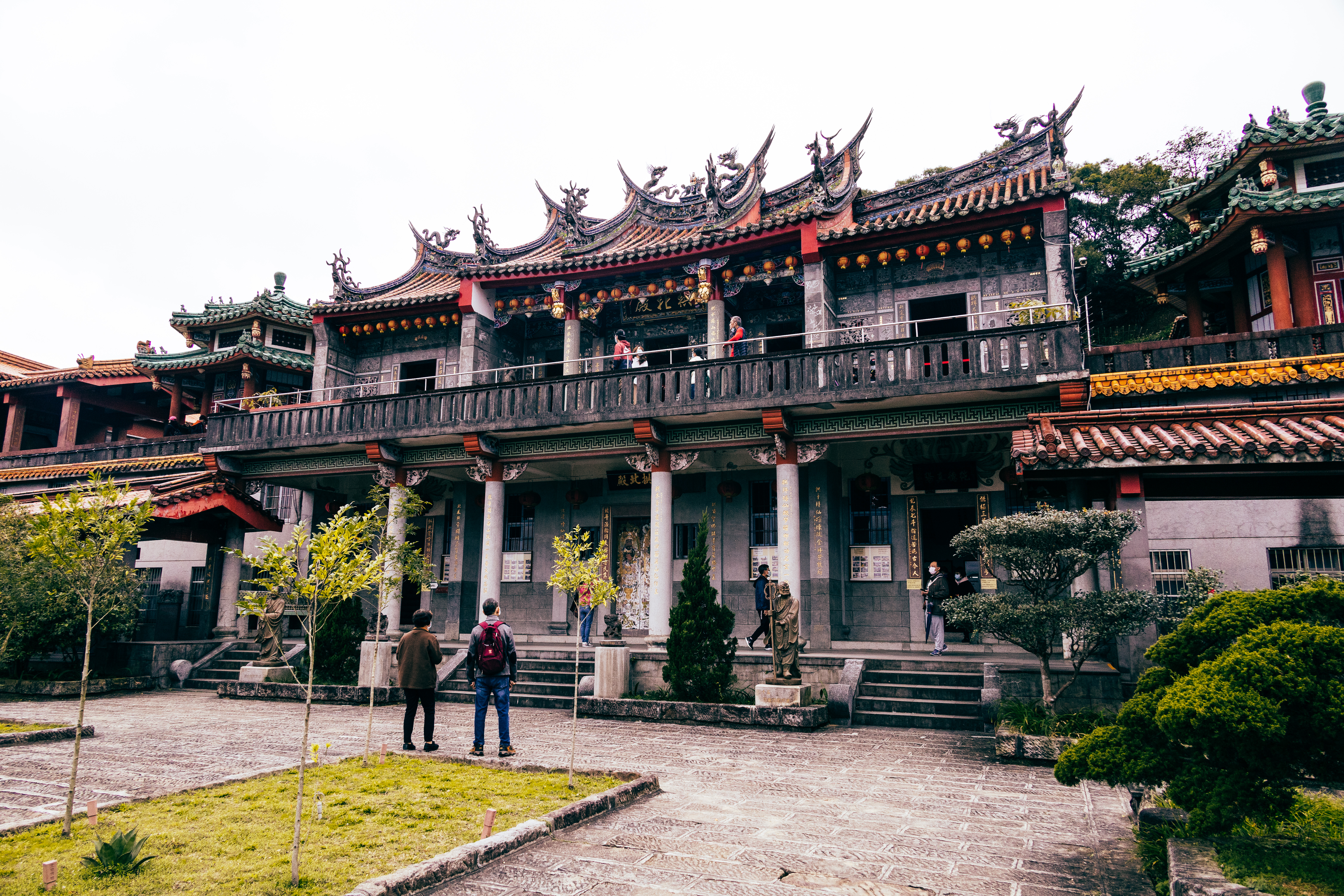

Religion
- Affiliation: Taoism

Location
- Location: No. 88, Section 3, Xiwan Road, Xizhi District, New Taipei, Taiwan
- Interactive map of Xizhi Gongbei Temple
- Coordinates: 25.094630316258154°N 121.64213593985272°E

Architecture
- Type: Taoist temple
- Completed: 1906

The Xizhi Gongbei Temple (Chinese: 汐止拱北殿; pinyin: Xīzhǐ gǒngběi diàn) is a traditional Taoist temple located on Sanxiu Mountain in Xizhi District, New Taipei, Taiwan. Zhenren Lü Dongbin, known locally as Hianggong (Chinese: 仙公), is the principal Deity worshiped at Xizhi Gongbei Temple. Every year, from late November to late December, the temple is also a popular tourist spot for maple viewing. There are various hiking trails around the Xizhi Gongbei Temple. The cityscape of downtown Xizhi and the mountains in the distance can be viewed after following the stone steps up to the Chuanliu Pavilion.

== History ==
Xizhi Gongbei Temple was first built during the Japanese rule in 1906. Since then, it has been reconstructed four times. Its last reconstruction started in 1960 and was completed in 1966.

== Transportation ==
The temple is accessible by Xizhi railway station of Taiwan Railway.

== Gallery ==
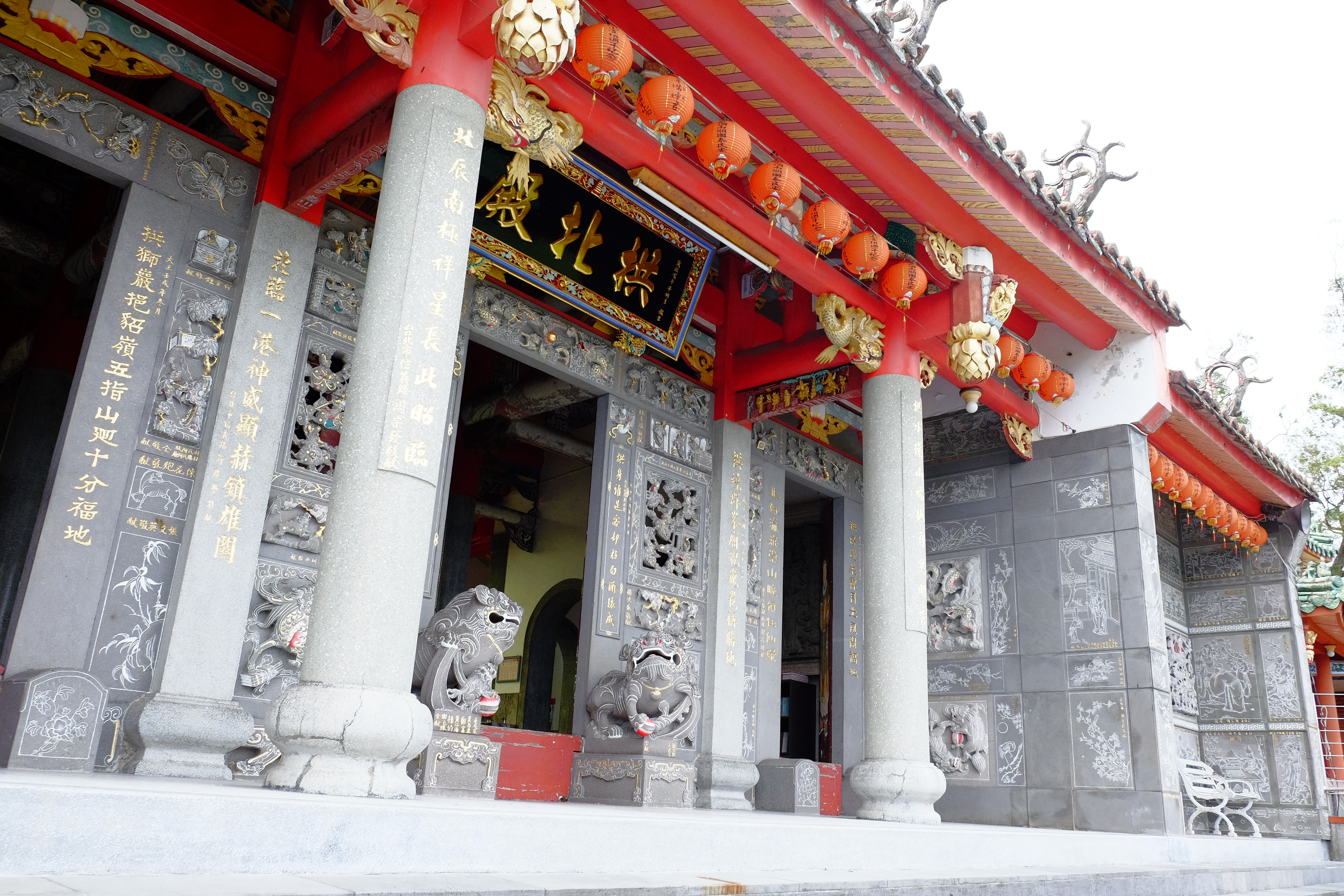

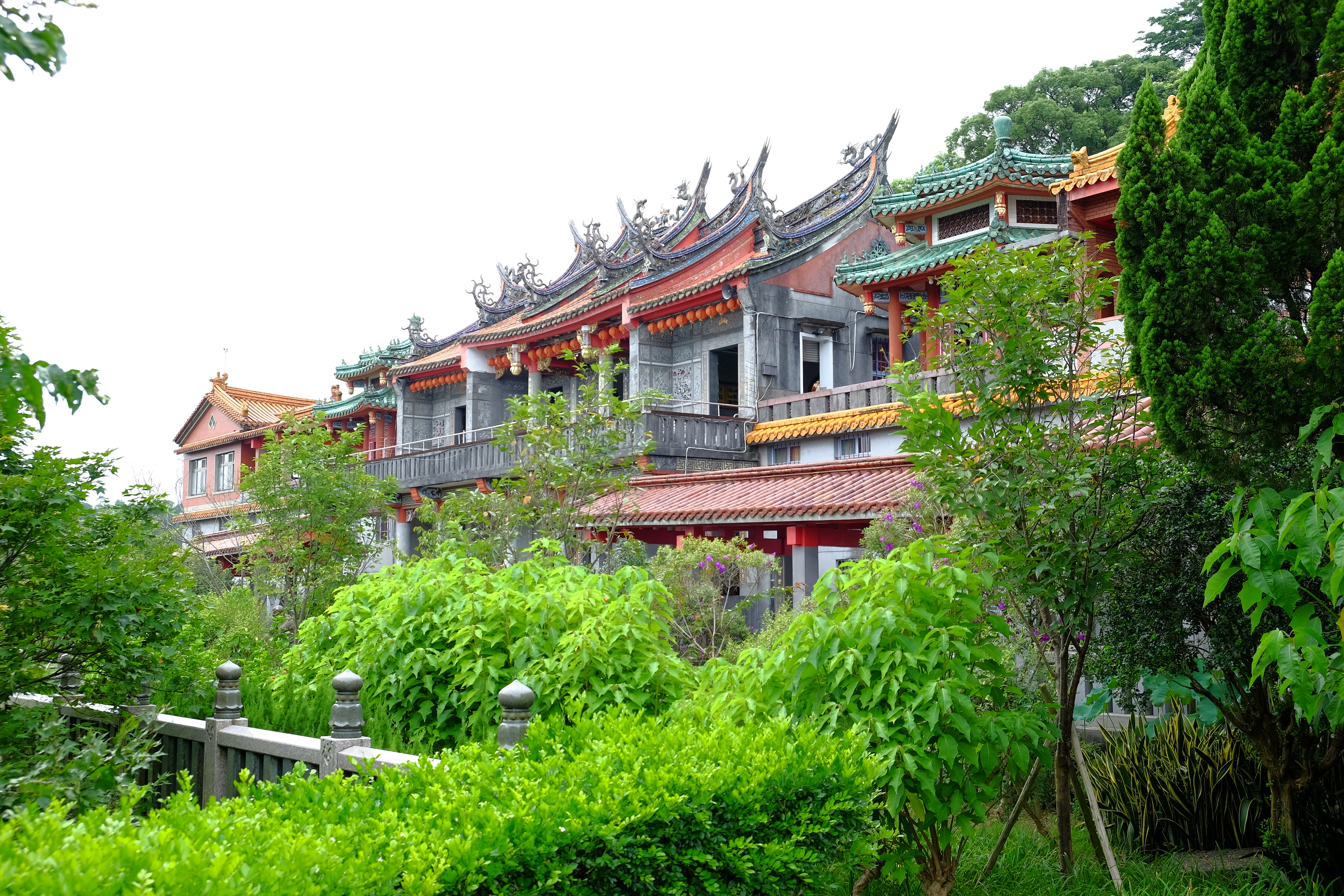

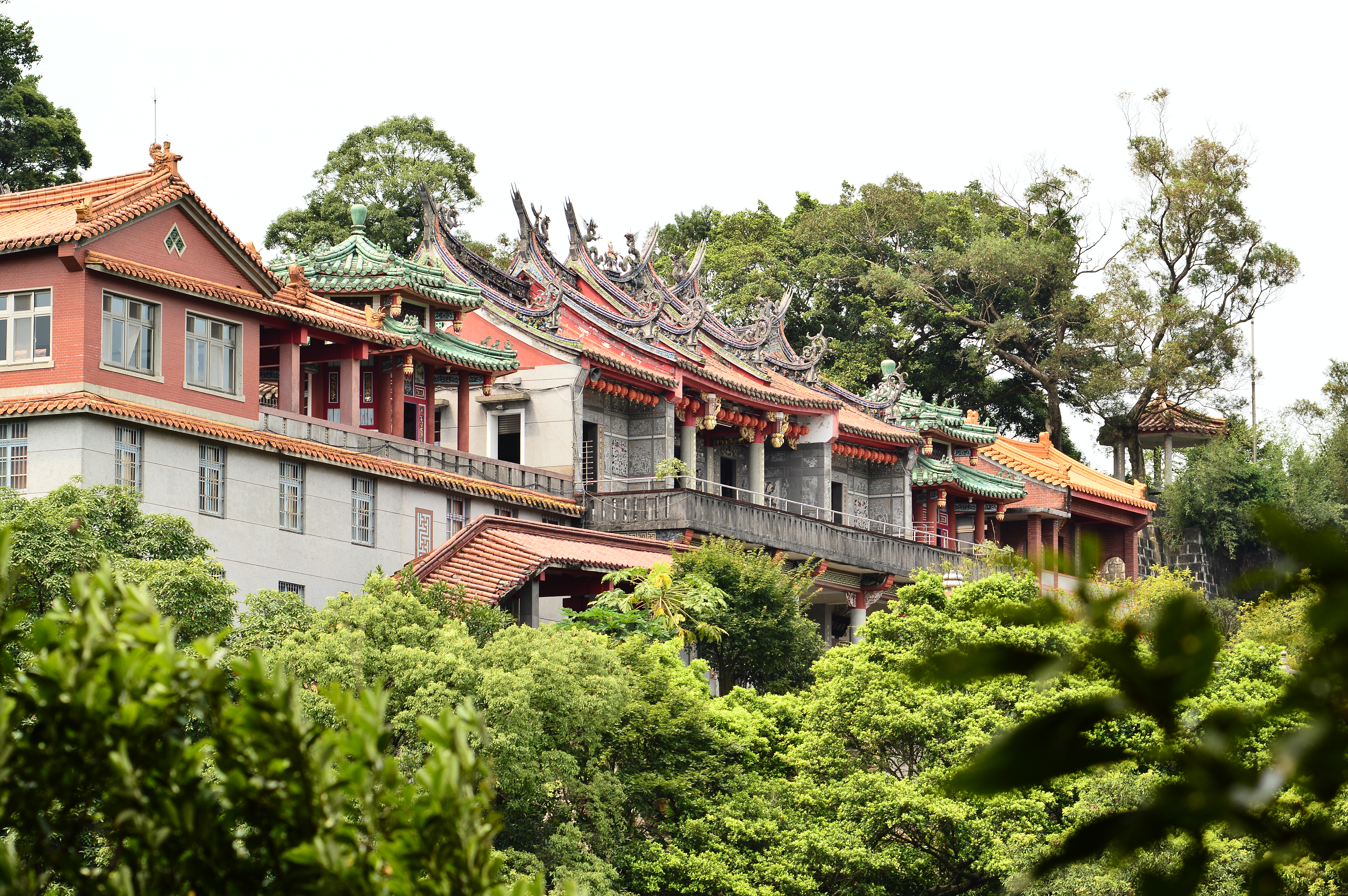

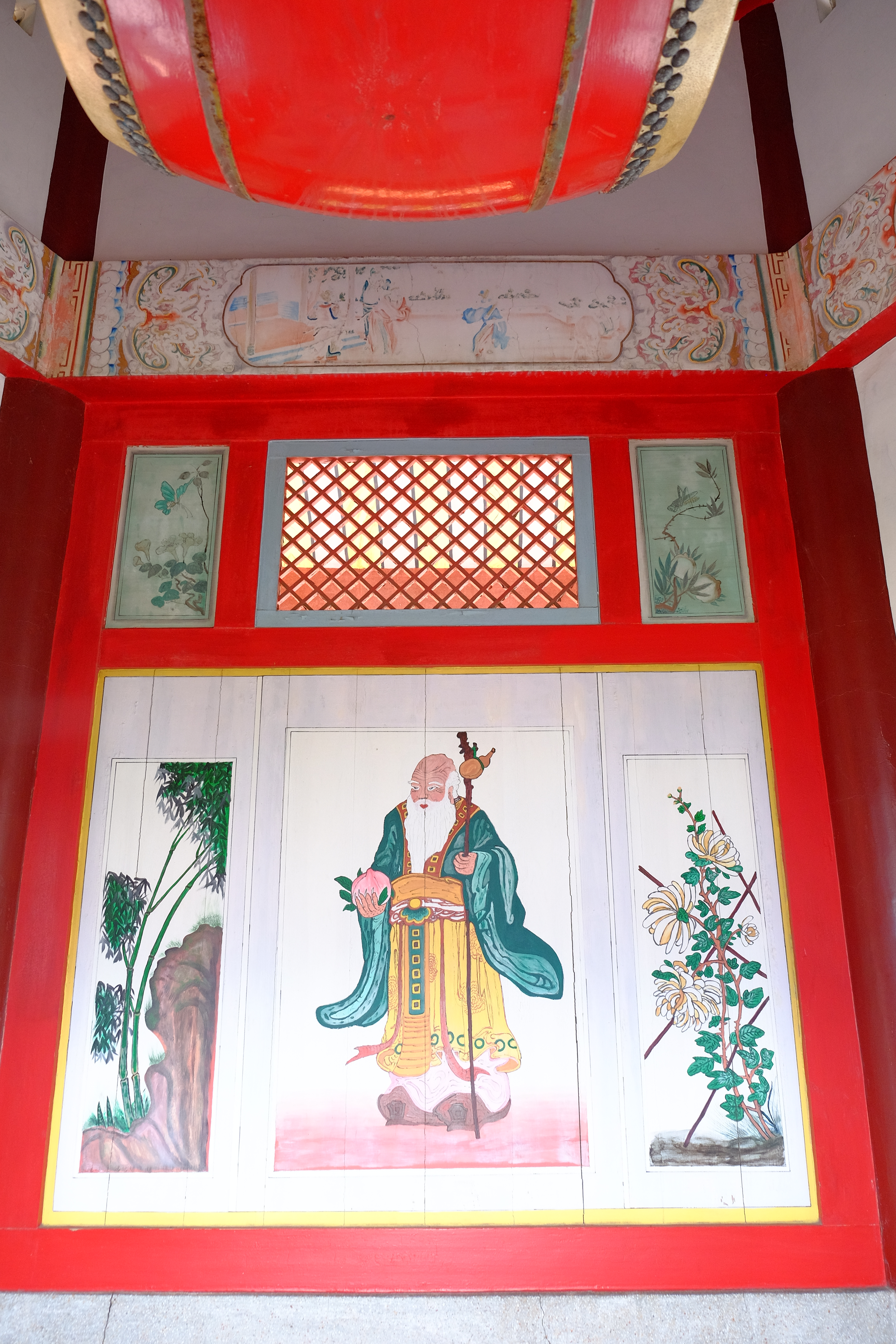

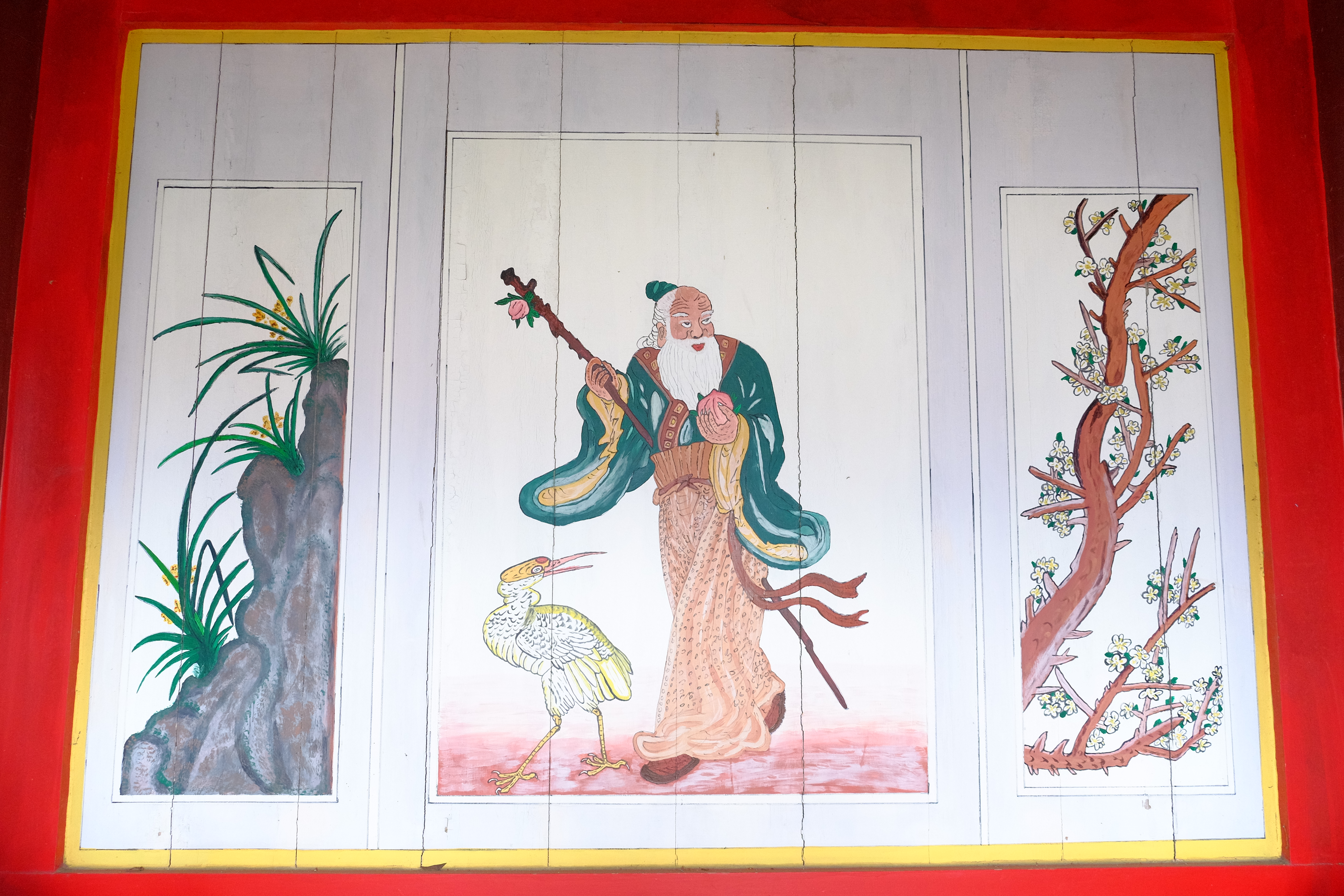

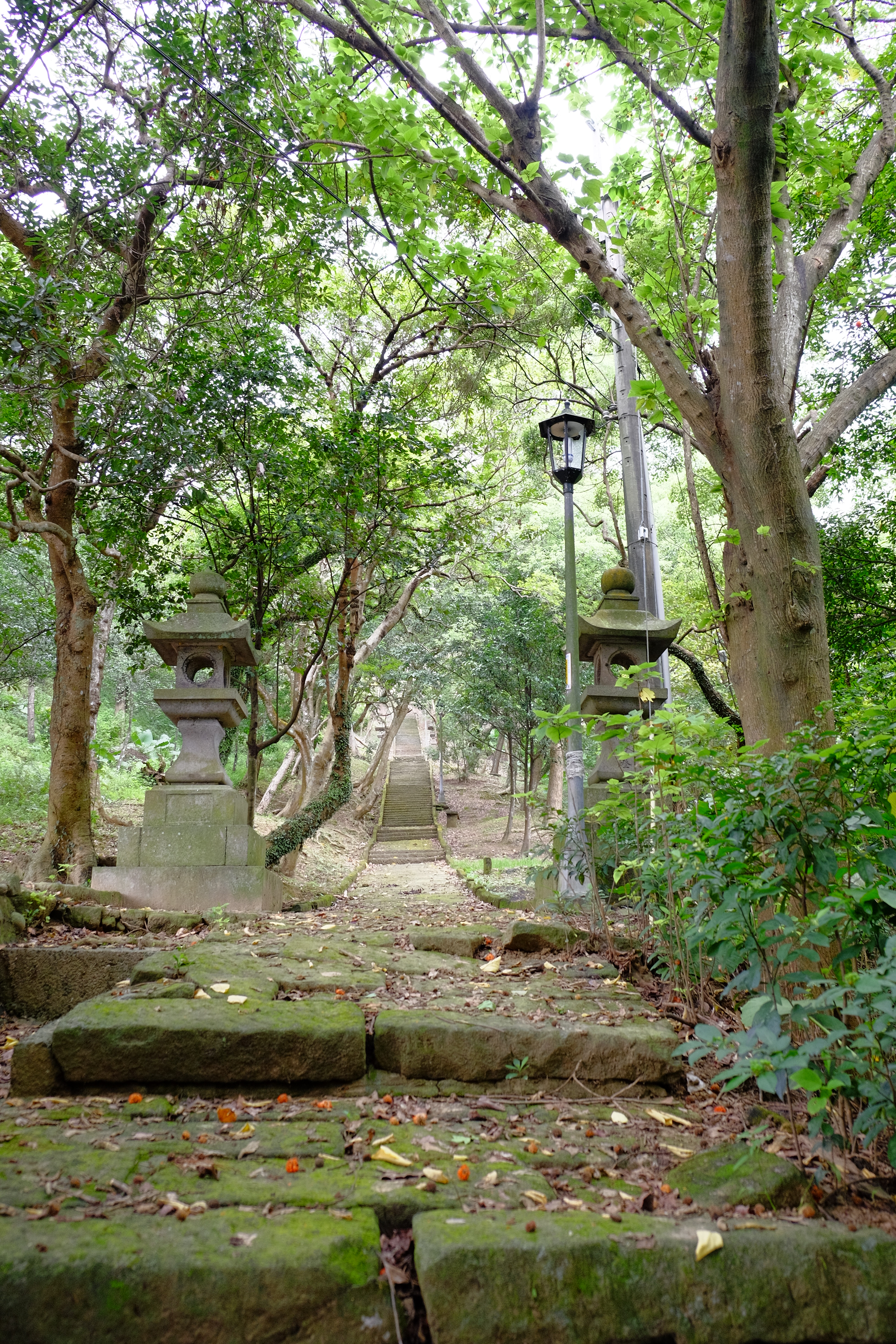
Stone lanterns

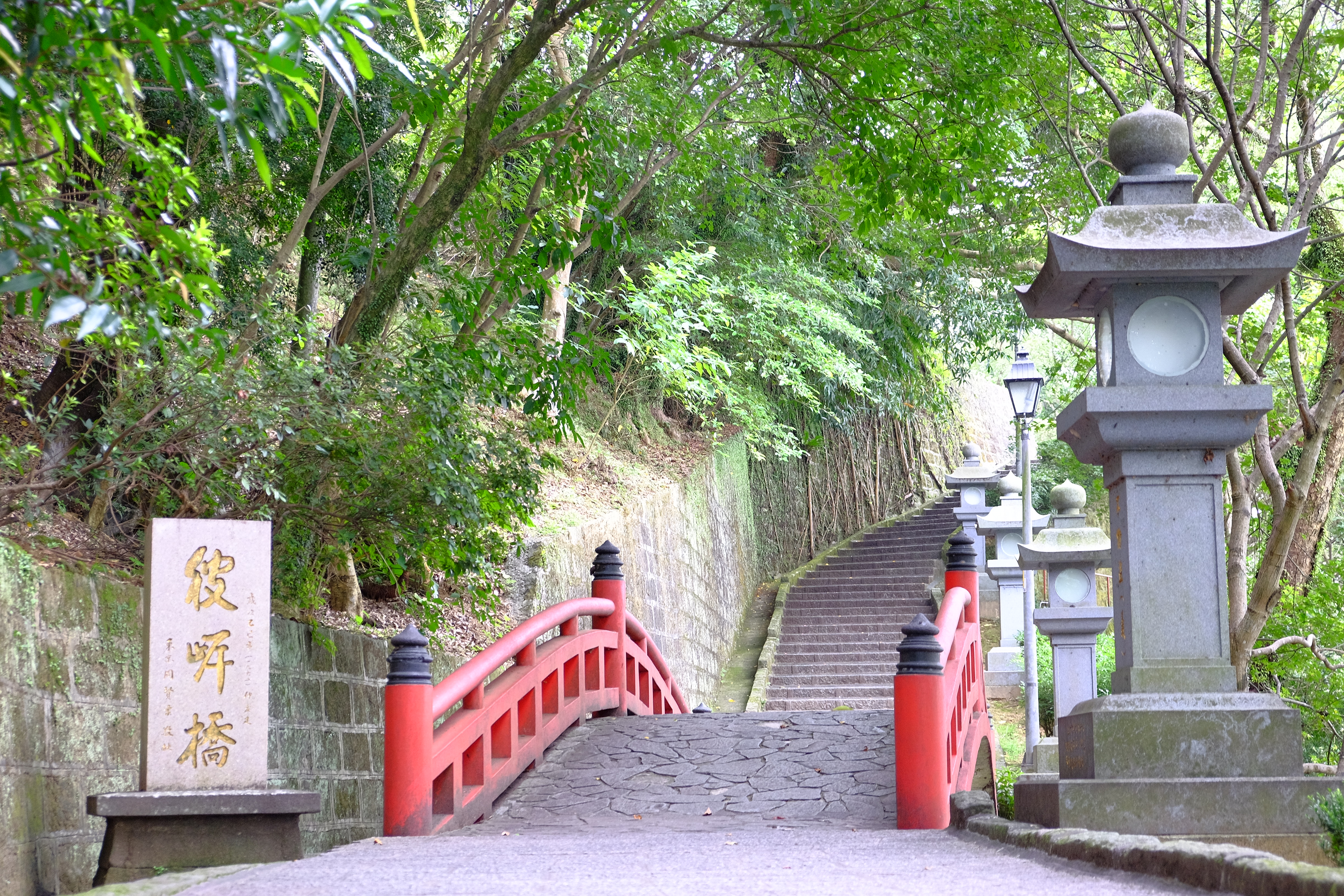
Arch bridge

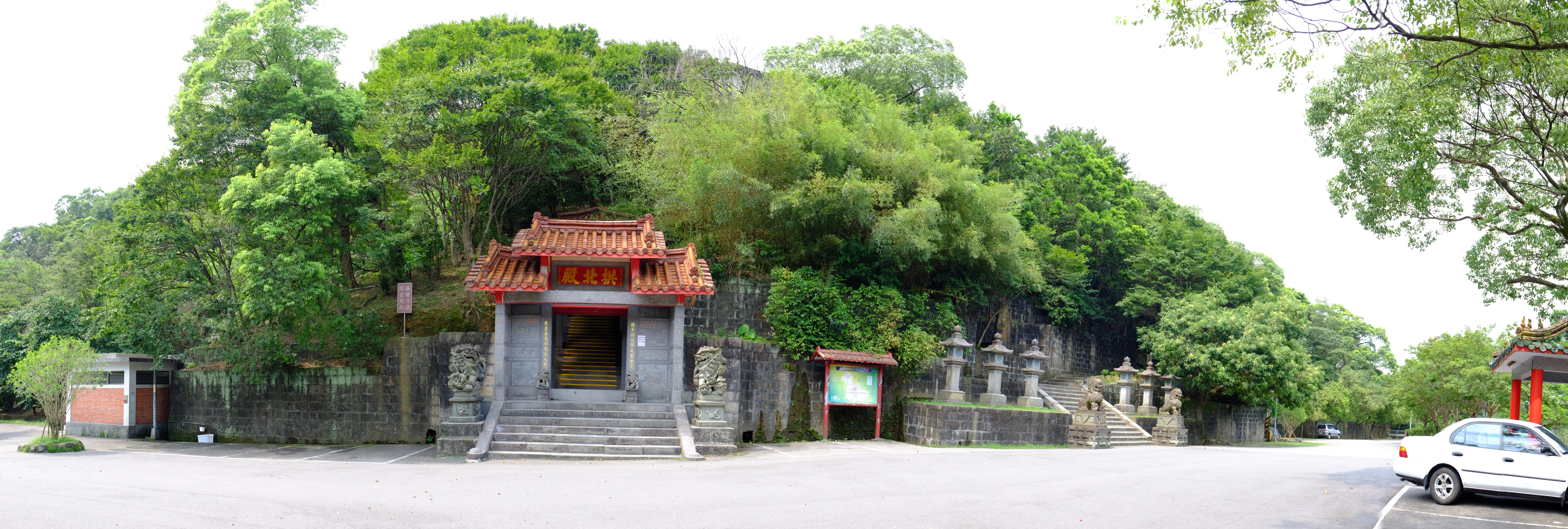
Car park

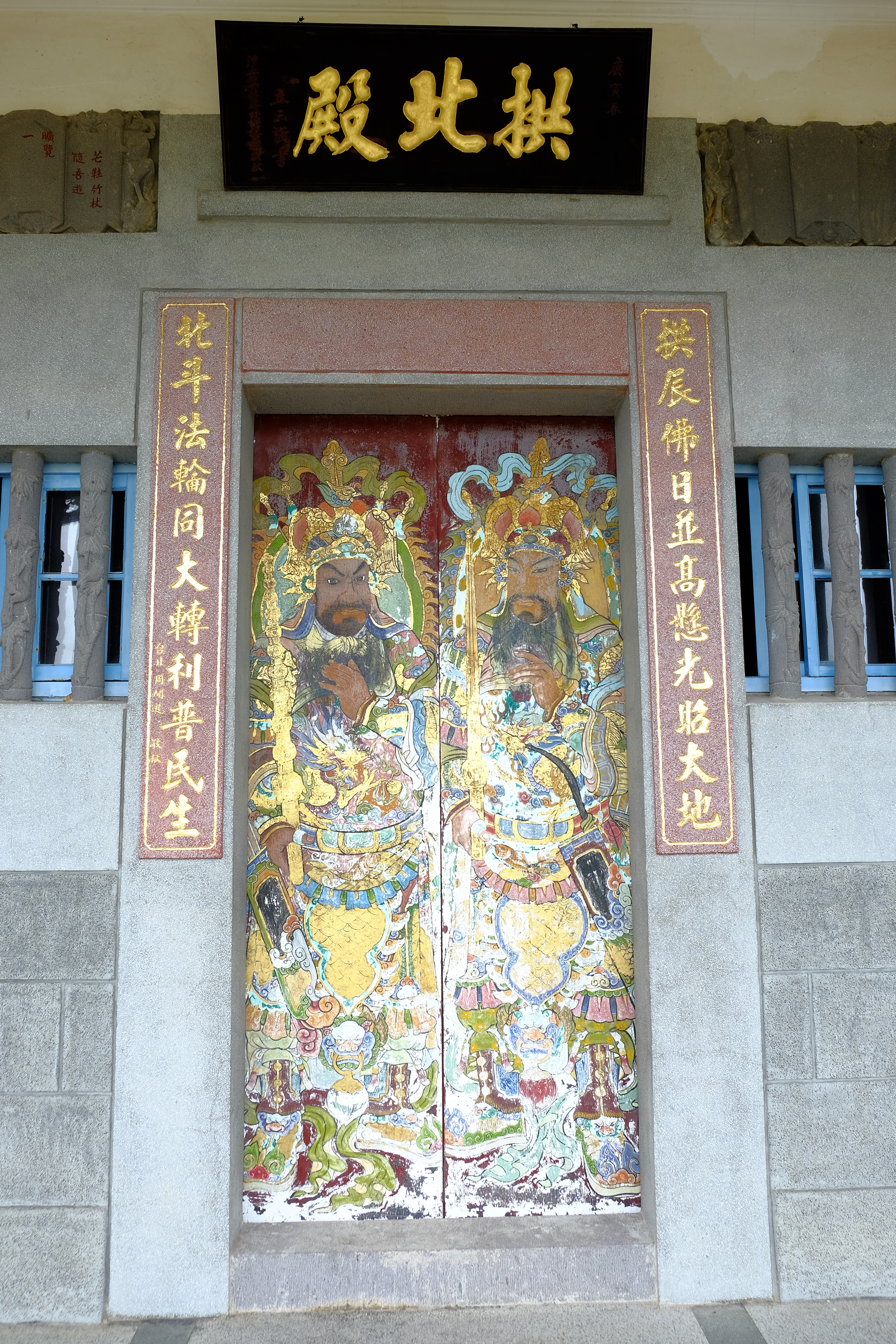

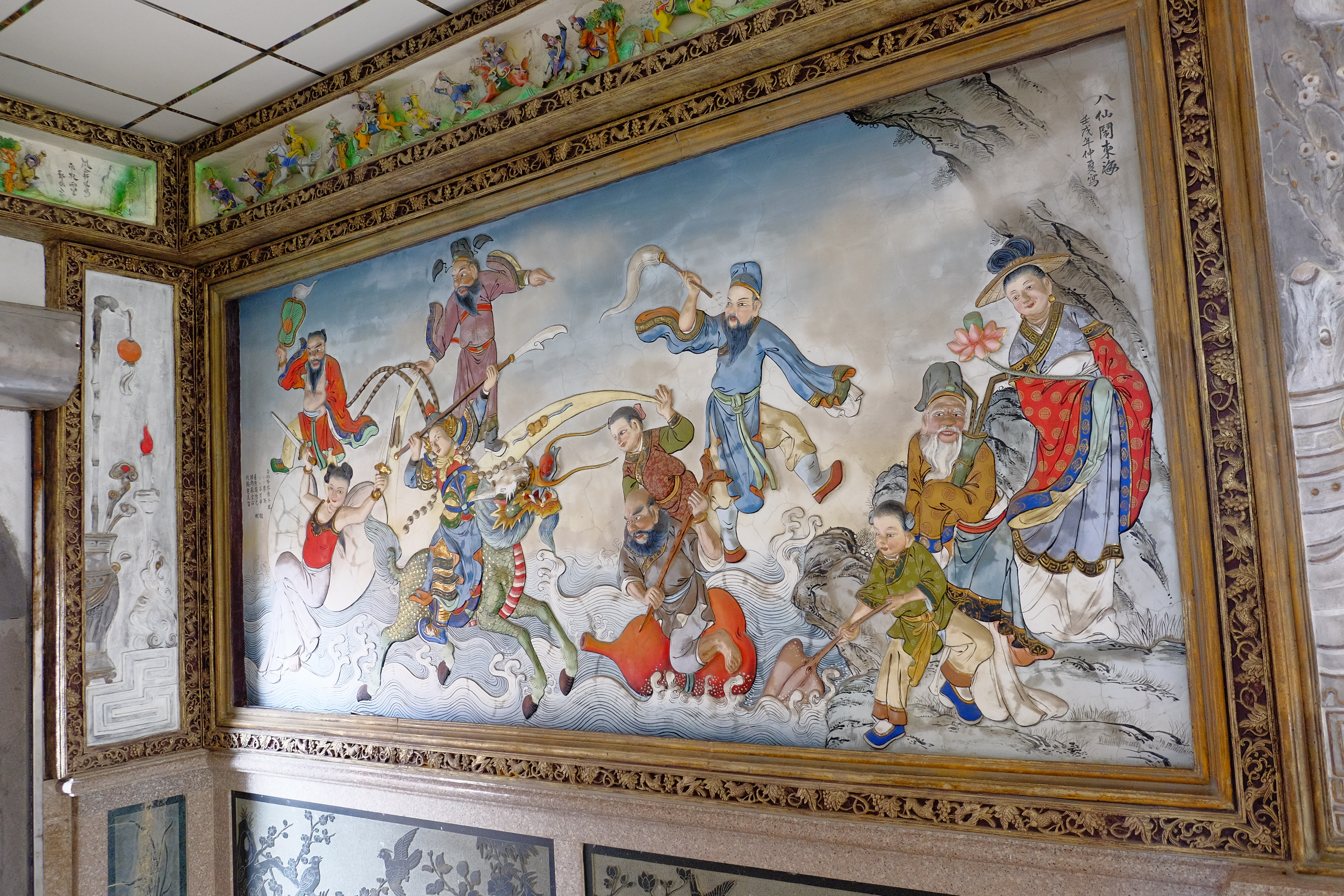
Wall paintings

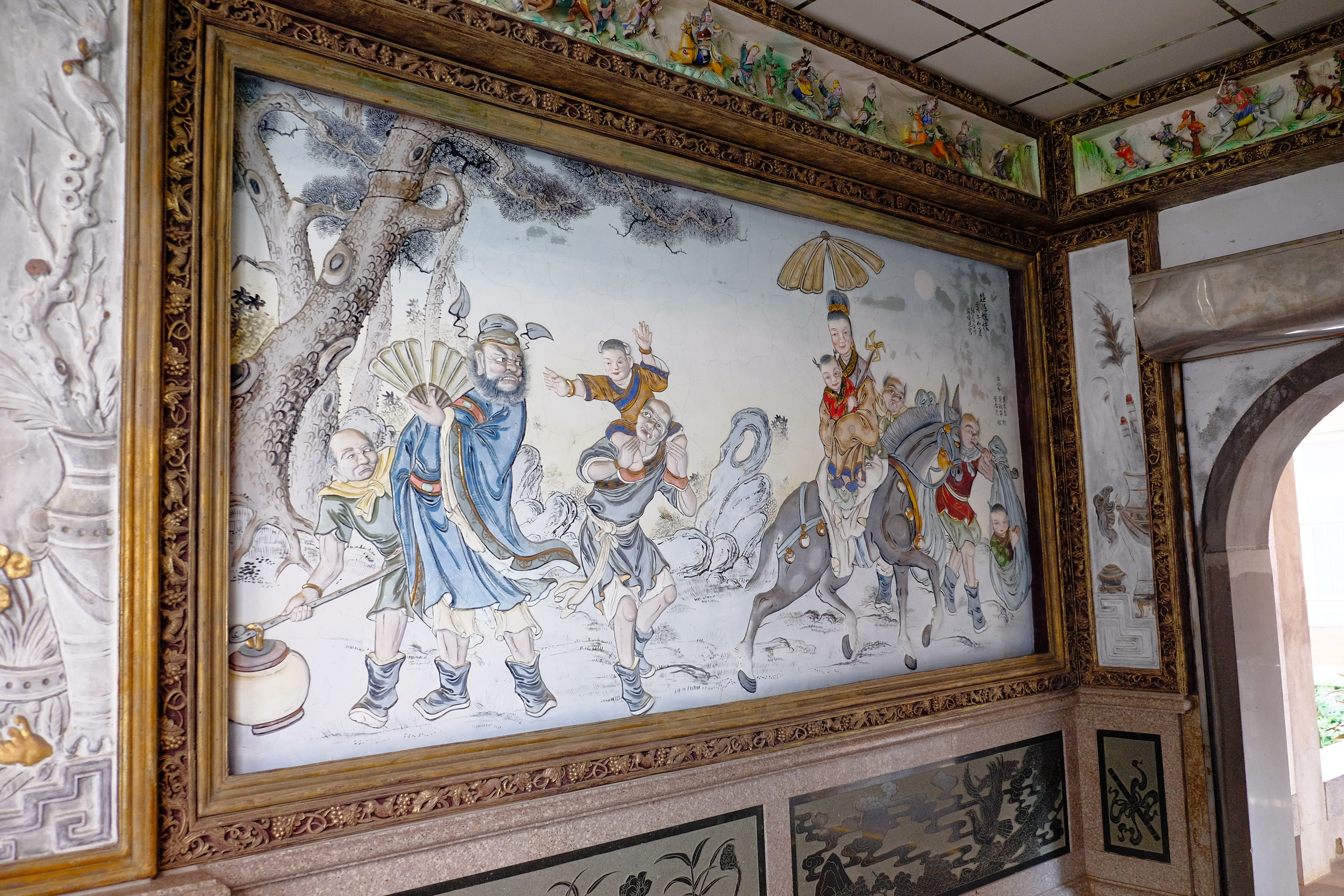
Wall paintings

== See also ==
- Lü Dongbin
- Zhinan Temple (指南宮), Taipei, Taiwan
- List of temples in Taiwan
- Religion in Taiwan
