= Department of Rapid Transit Systems =

New Taipei City government branch

Department of Rapid Transit Systems, New Taipei City Government
- 新北市政府捷運工程局
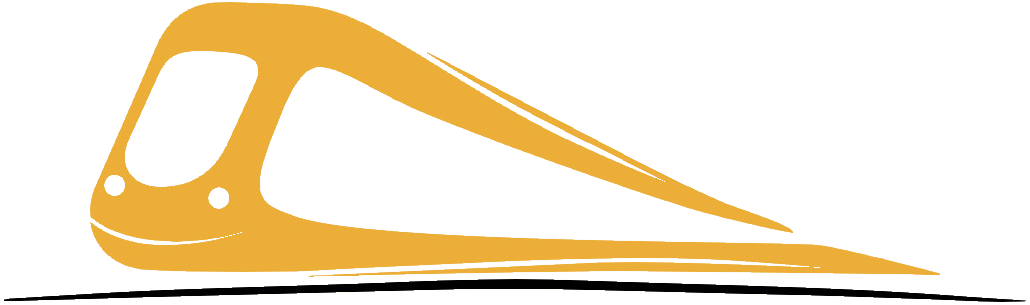

Agency overview
- Headquarters: Xindian District, New Taipei
- Parent agency: New Taipei City Government
- Website: www.dorts.ntpc.gov.tw

The Department of Rapid Transit Systems (DRTS; Chinese: 新北市政府捷運工程局) is a New Taipei City Government branch established in 2013 which oversees the construction and regulation of the Taipei Metro and New Taipei Metro systems in New Taipei. They work alongside the DORTS (Taipei), while the Taipei Rapid Transit Corporation and New Taipei Metro Corporation handles system operations.

== Lines ==
=== Under Construction ===
Line			Termini		Stations	Length (km)	Depot
	Sanying line	1st	Dingpu	Yintao Fude	12	13.78	Sanxia
Minsheng–Xizhi line	Xidong metro		Donghu	Xizhi District Office	6	5.56	Xizhi

=== Planning ===
The following lines are currently in the planning stages:

Line			Termini		Stations	Length (km)	Depot
	Danhai light rail		Tamsui Fisherman's Wharf	Tamsui	25	13.99	Danhai
	Danhai light rail		Kanding	St. John's University	25	13.99	Danhai
	Danhai light rail		Tamsui	Kanding	25	13.99	Danhai
	Danhai light rail		Tamsui Fisherman's Wharf	BaLi	25	13.99	Danhai
	Sanying line	2nd	Yintao Fude	Da'nan	2	3.7	Sanxia
Keelung Mass Rapid Transit	Keelung metro		Nangang	Badu	11	10.45	Badu
Wugu–Taishan light rail	Wugu-Taishan light rail		Fenziwei	Fu Jen Catholic University Hospital	13	15.6	
	Taishan-Banqiao light rail		Fu Jen Catholic University Hospital	Juguang	14	10.38	Taiban
	Zhonghe-Guangfu line		Xiulang Bridge	Gongguan	4	3.1	South
	Zhonghe-Guangfu line		Gongguan	Sun Yat-sen Memorial Hall	4	5	South
	Shenkeng light rail		Taipei Zoo	Shiding Service Area	7	8	
