= Keelung Mass Rapid Transit =

Planned railway system in Taipei, Taiwan

Keelung MRT

Overview
- Native name: 基隆捷運
- Owner: New Taipei DORTS
- Locale: Keelung, Taipei and New Taipei, Taiwan
- Termini: Nangang; Badu (Phase 1)
- Stations: 13 (Phase 1)

Service
- Type: Rapid transit
- System: Taipei Metro
- Route number: KL
- Depot: Shehou

History
- Planned opening: SB34 - SB25: December 2032; SB31 - SB22: December 2034

Technical
- Character: Underground, elevated
- Track gauge: 1,435 mm (4 ft 8 1/2 in) standard gauge

The Keelung MRT (Chinese: 基隆捷運) is a medium-volume rapid transit system planned in the Taipei metropolitan area of Taiwan. It mainly serves public transportation between Keelung City, Xizhi District, New Taipei, and Nangang District, Taipei, Formerly known as the "Mountain Line" in the "Keelung Light Rail" project promoted by the Keelung City Government, On February 22, 2022, the then President of the Executive Yuan Su Tseng-chang announced that the plan for the first phase of the Keelung MRT from Nangang to Badu was finalized. The environmental impact assessment was approved on April 12, 2023, and 13 stations will be built along the line.

== History ==
In early 2006, the Keelung City Government commissioned Zhongxing Engineering Consulting Company to conduct a "Feasibility Study on the Keelung Light Rail Transportation System" and submitted a final report. The plan proposed four routes, with Keelung Station as the center of the road network: the East Line leading to Badouzi and the National Museum of Marine Science and Technology; the terminal of the second east line is located at Pier 11 on the west coast of Keelung Port; the west line leads to Dawulun; and the second west line is initially built from Shipise to Keelung Chang Gung Memorial Hospital, and then extended to Qidu. The right-of-way design is mainly based on shared right-of-way (people and vehicles traveling together). In order to deal with the tourist crowds brought about by the opening of the National Museum of Marine Science and Technology in Badouzi, the east line passing through the east coast of Keelung Port was the top priority for construction. The Keelung Light Rail was considered by the central government to help relieve Keelung's traffic and improve the economic benefits of tourism and recreation, so it was given priority over other counties and cities. The original estimated construction schedule was to obtain subsidy funds from the Ministry of Transportation for detailed planning in 2006, and submit to the Executive Yuan for approval in 2007 before proceeding with contracting and basic design. The civil engineering project would start in 2011, and the mechanical and electrical engineering would be constructed four years later. It would be completed and opened to traffic in 2015.

== Line ==
The first phase route of the Keelung MRT has been finalized and may be connected with the Xidong MRT in the future. The line will run from Nangang to Badu Railway Station, The line has a total of 17 stations and 13 on Phase 1 and a length of 19.1 km. CAF will deliver 23 Urbos trams for the future Xidong and Keelung lines. The nine-section low-floor trams will be 55 m long.

== See also ==
- Rail transport in Taiwan
- Taipei Metro
- New Taipei Metro
- Keelung City
