= Xike railway station =

Railway station located in New Taipei, Taiwan

Xike 汐科
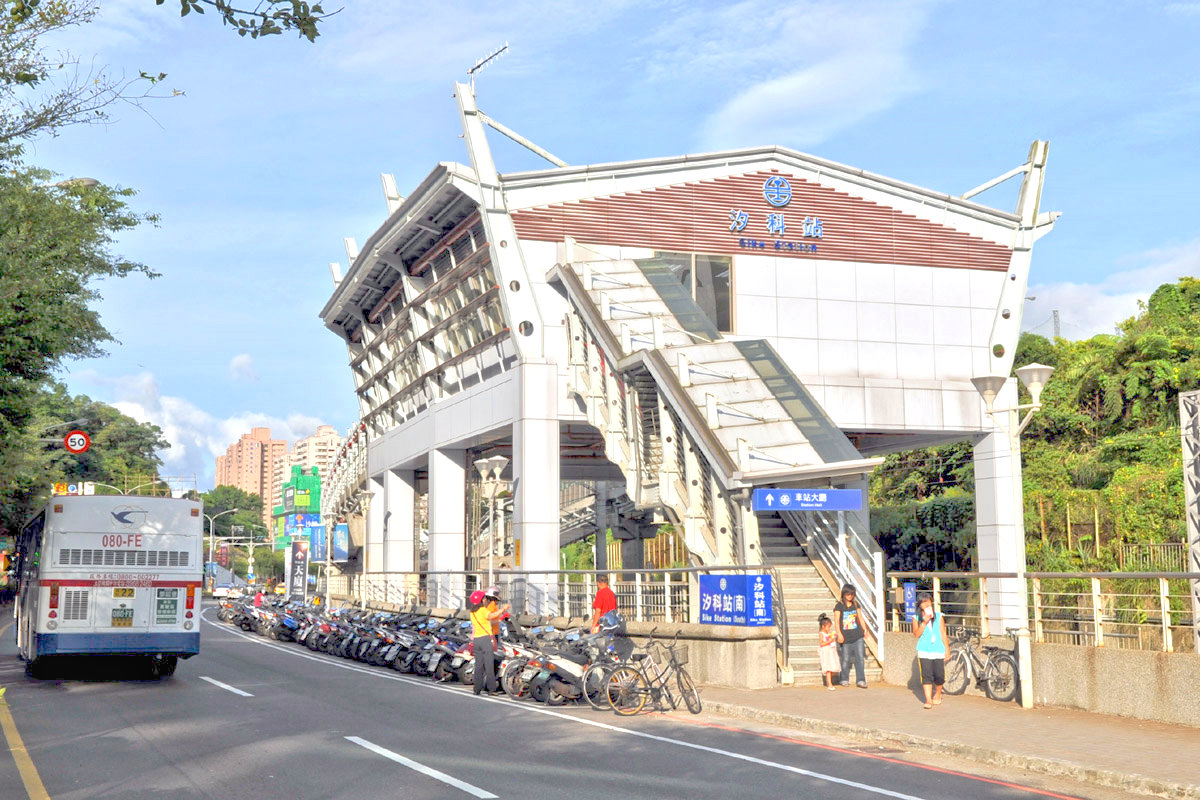

Chinese name
- Traditional Chinese: 汐科/汐止科學園區
- Literal meaning: Xizhi Science Park
Transcriptions
Standard Mandarin
- Hanyu Pinyin: Xìke/Xìzhī Kēxué Yuánqū
- Bopomofo: ㄒㄧˋ ㄎㄜ/ㄒㄧˋ ㄓˇ ㄎㄜ ㄒㄩㄝˊ ㄩㄢˊ ㄑㄩ
- Wade–Giles: Hsi⁴-k'ê¹

General information
- Location: 182 Sec 2 Datong Rd; Xizhi District, New Taipei; Taiwan
- Coordinates: 25.0627°N 121.6466°E
- System: Taiwan Railway railway station
- Line: Western Trunk line
- Distance: 14.6 km to Keelung
- Connections: Local bus; Coach

Construction
- Structure type: Elevated

Other information
- Station code: A064 (statistical)
- Classification: Simple (Chinese: 簡易)

History
- Opened: 30 December 2007

Passengers
- 23,478 daily (2024)

Services
Preceding station	Taiwan Railway	Following station
Xizhi towards Keelung	Western Trunk line	Nangang towards Pingtung
Location
- Location within Taiwan

Xike (Chinese: 汐科) is a railway station in New Taipei, Taiwan served by Taiwan Railway. Located near Xizhi's science and technology park, it experiences heavy traffic during the morning and early evening rush hours.

== Construction ==
Construction started in June 2005 and finished on schedule in December 2007. During planning the names South Xizhi Station (南汐止站) and Xike Park Station (汐科園區站) were mooted, but eventually the name Xike Station (汐科站) was chosen.

== Usage ==
Media reports have highlighted Xike Station as part of the "MRT-ization" plan for Taiwan's urban railways, offering convenient transport for commuters, spurring new residential construction, and raising property prices in the vicinity of the station.

Only local trains stop at this station.

== Future expansion ==
The planned Minsheng–Xizhi line of the Taipei Metro (MRT) system would see Xike Station transformed into a TRA and MRT interchange station.

== Around the station ==
- Farglory U-Town (next to the station)
- Acer Inc. Headquarters (300m to the south)
- Oriental Science Park (450m to the southeast)

== See also ==
- List of railway stations in Taiwan
