= Department of Rapid Transit Systems (Taipei City) =

Taipei government branch

Department of Rapid Transit Systems, Taipei City Government
- 臺北市政府捷運工程局
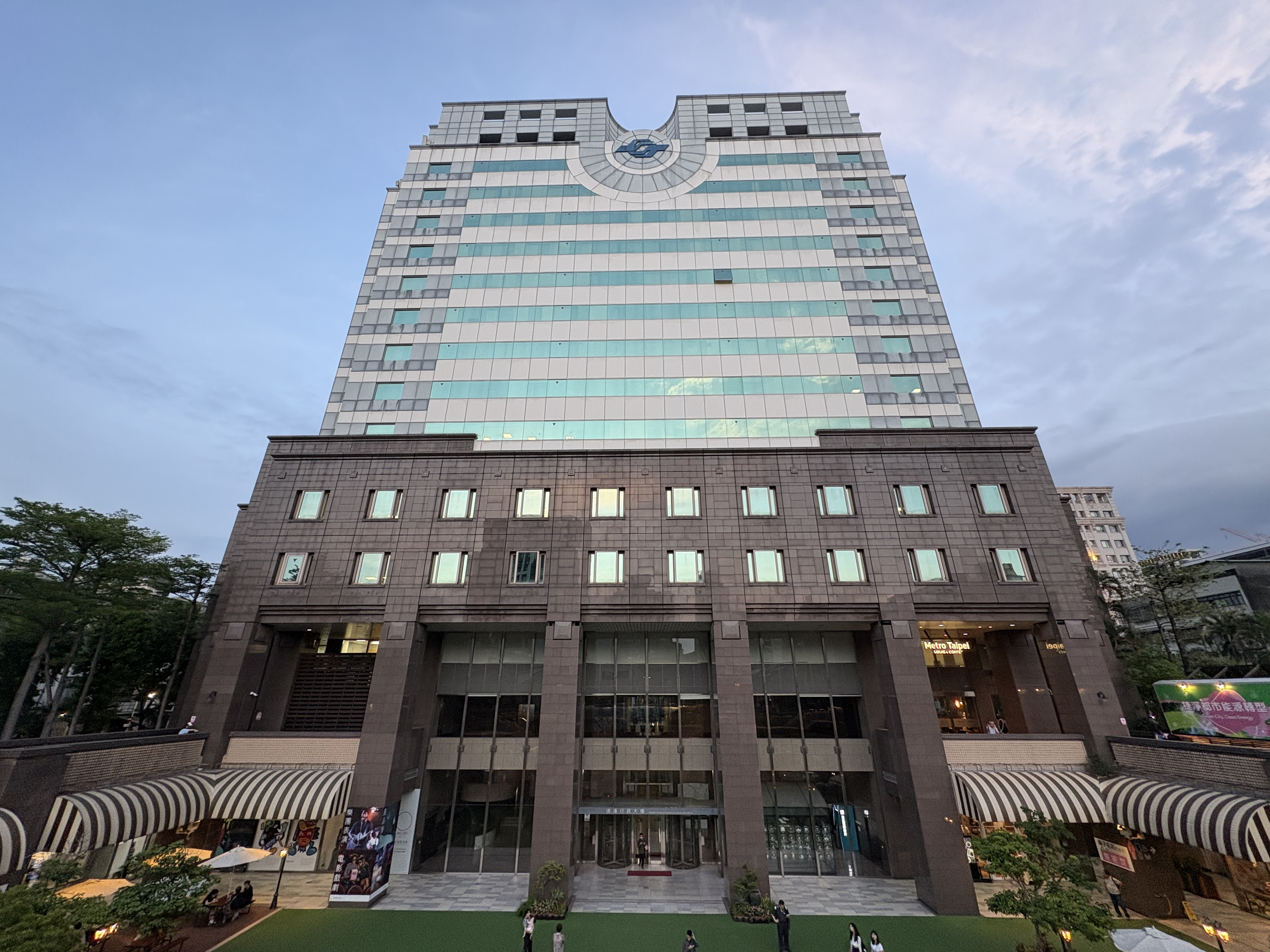
- Rapid Transit Administration Building

Agency overview
- Headquarters: Zhongshan District, Taipei
- Parent agency: Taipei City Government
- Website: www.dorts.gov.taipei

The Department of Rapid Transit Systems (DORTS; Chinese: 臺北市政府捷運工程局) is a Taipei City Government branch established in 1987 which oversees the construction and regulation of the Taipei Metro system along with DRTS (New Taipei), while the Taipei Rapid Transit Corporation handles the running and maintenance of the system.
