= Lanner Electronics =

Taiwanese electronics manufacturer

Lanner Electronics, Inc.
- Company type: Public (TWSE: 6245)
- Industry: Computer hardware Electronics
- Founded: 1986; 40 years ago
- Headquarters: New Taipei, Taiwan
- Key people: Emily Chou, CEO
- Products: Industrial PCs; Embedded systems Single-board computers Motherboards; Network Appliance; Vehicle Computers
- Number of employees: 982
- Website: lannerinc.com

Lanner Electronics, Inc. (TSE:6245) (Chinese: 立端科技股份有限公司; pinyin: Lìduān Kējì Gǔfèn Yǒuxiàn Gōngsī), is a Taiwanese electronics manufacturer specializing in network appliances, industrial computers, embedded computers, vehicle PCs, motherboards and related accessories. Lanner owns and operates printed circuit board (PCB) manufacturing, chassis manufacturing and computer assembly factories. The company focuses mainly on OEM/ODM manufacturing for global name brand computer and computer peripheral companies. Lanner's main product lines include network appliance platforms, rugged embedded computers, and telecommunication carrier-grade platforms.

== History ==
Lanner Electronics was established in March 1986 as GES Taiwan, a subsidiary of a Singapore-based industrial PC company, GES International. In 1993, Lanner separated from the GES group and launched its own industrial computer chassis and SBC Single-board computer product lines under the name Lanner Electronics. In 2000, Lanner launched its new factory with one SMT line in Xizhi, Taipei County, and in 2003, the company went public on the Taiwan Stock Exchange. In 2006, Lanner opened a new factory and doubled output capacity.

== Subsidiaries ==
Lanner Electronics owns and operates the following subsidiaries:

- Lanner Electronics USA, Inc. – The USA subsidiary is located in Fremont, CA, United States.
- Lanner Electronics Canada Ltd. – The office of this subsidiary is located in Mississauga, Ontario.
- L&S Lancom Platform Technology Company, Ltd. – This subsidiary serves all of mainland China. Its main office is located in Beijing.
- Lanner Europe B.V. – This subsidiary serves EU member states and the UK. The office is located in The Hague, Netherlands.

== Operations ==
With headquarters in Xizhi District, New Taipei City, Lanner operates 7 subsidiaries and manufacturing facilities in mainland China, Canada and the United States, five of which are in mainland China, one in the United States, and one in Canada. Lanner's Fremont (California) office serves the United States. Its Mississauga, Ontario office serves Canada and the east coast of the United States. Lanner's Beijing office is the main office of the subsidiary L&S Lancom Platform Technology Company, Ltd.

== Products ==
Lanner's products are divided into three main product lines:

- Network Computing Appliance for firewall, UTM, wired/wireless management, application delivery and WAN optimization
- Rugged, Embedded & Industrial Computing for Smart City, IoT applications, industrial automation, video analytics and intelligent transportation
- Telecom Datacenter Carrier-grade Platform for virtual CPE, SDN, NFV, cloud-RAN, artificial intelligence, video transcoding and mobile edge computing

== Industry Alliances ==
Lanner Electronics is an associate member of the Intel Intelligent Systems Alliance.

== See also ==
- List of companies of Taiwan
- Industrial PC
- Embedded system
