= National Keelung Commercial & Industrial Vocational Senior High School =

High school in Qidu, Keelung, Taiwan

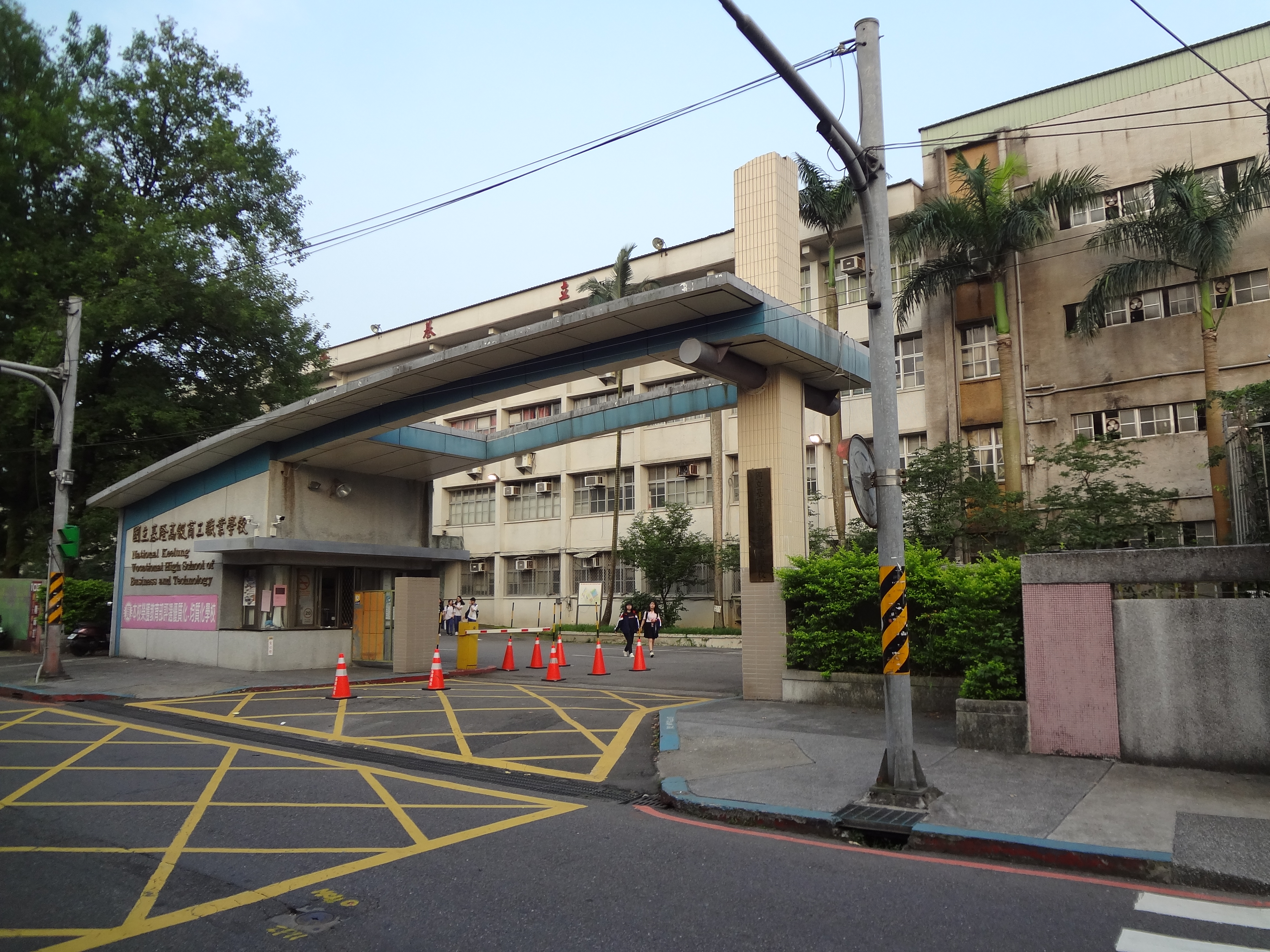

Location
- Qidu District, Keelung City, Taiwan; 25.094°N 121.717°E

Information
- Type: Public, National
- Motto: Sincerity, Honesty, Diligence, and Persistence
- Established: 1949
- Principal: Zhi-Jian Lin
- Grades: Three
- Campus: Suburban
- Website: www.klcivs.kl.edu.tw

National Keelung Commercial & Industrial Vocational Senior High School (KLCIVS; Chinese: 國立基隆高級商工職業學校) is a Taiwanese vocational high school and comprehensive high school located in Qidu, Keelung. Founded in 1949, its initial name was Keelung Municipal Commercial Continuing Education School (Chinese: 基隆市立商業補習學校). After the administration of Taiwan Province Government was streamlined in 2000, the School became national and adopted the current name.

== History ==
=== 1949–1968: Keelung Municipal Commercial Continuing Education School and Keelung Municipal Commercial Vocational Senior High School ===
Initially named Keelung Municipal Commercial Continuing Education School, the school was first located in modern-day Shin Yi Elementary School, Ren-ai District, Keelung in 1949 as the first commercial school for students in Keelung Area. In 1957, the school was relocated to Liou Ming Chwan Road (also in Ren-ai District) and reorganized into Keelung Municipal Commercial Vocational High School. On April 26, 1960, the school was relocated again to modern-day Zhong-Zeng Park, in which the new school building was built. The day was also concluded as the anniversary day of the school.

=== 1968–2000: Taiwan Provincial Keelung Commercial & industrial Vocational Senior High School ===
In 1968, it was reorganized into Taiwan Provincial Keelung Commercial & industrial Vocational Senior High School in accordance with the policy by the government. The school was relocated to Qidu where has been the permanent campus of the school. In this year, industrial departments were established.

== Successive principal ==
Name	Tenure	Note
Guang-Bin Yao	1949.7–1957.7	
Da-Xiang Li	1957.7–1961.5	Transferred to Cheng Yuan High School
Guo-Xu Feng	1961.6–1977.10	
Xian-Zhang Zhang	1977.11–1978.1	Deputy; Transferred to Zhongli Home Economics and Commercial Vocational Senior High School
Zhi-Juen Huang	1978.2–1985.2	
Xian-Zhang Zhang	1985.2–1991.1	
Min-Hou Li	1991.2–2000.7	
Ming-Xin Lien	2000.8–2005.7	
Ming-Hua Zhang	2005.8–2011.7	Transferred to Zhong He Senior High School
Wen-Zheng Lai	2011.7–2011.11	Deputy
Ming-Yin Chen	2011.11–2019.7	Transferred to Keelung Girls' Senior High School
Guang-Xian Hung	2019.8–2025.7	Transferred to Yilan Senior High School
Zhi-Jian Lin	2025.7–	Current

== Academics ==
There are twelve academic departments in KLCIVS:

- Comprehensive Senior High School
- Department of Business Management
- Department of Accounting
- Department of International Trade
- Department of Data Processing
- Department of Advertisement Design (Department of Advertisement Techniques is included)
- Department of Arts and Crafts
- Department of Electrics
- Department of Computer Science
- Department of Avionics
- Department of Comprehensive Occupational Abilities
- Department of Physical Education

== Sister high schools ==
Hiroshima Prefectural Miyoshi Seiryo Senior High School, Hiroshima Prefecture, Japan

== See also ==
- High school
- Vocational school
- Comprehensive high school
- Education in Taiwan
- List of schools in Taiwan
