= Wudu River =

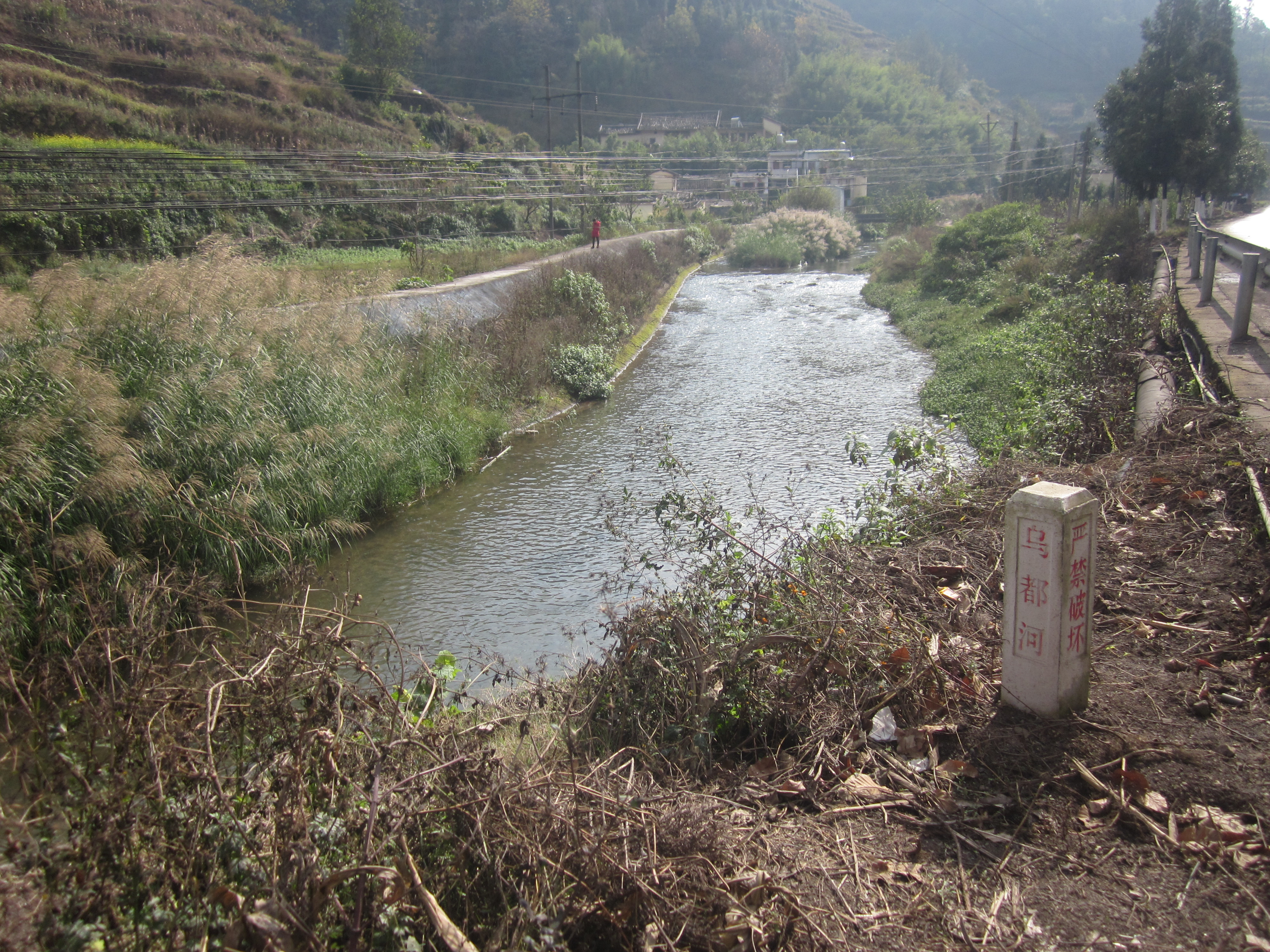
- Picture of Wudu River in Panzhou, Guizhou, China.
- Native name: 乌都河 (Chinese)

Physical characteristics
- Source: Mulong Village, Danxia Town
  - location: Panzhou, Guizhou
- Mouth: Beipan River
  - location: Niuguntang of Huaga Miao, Buyi and Yi Ethnic Township
- Length: 106 km (66 mi)
- Basin size: 1,997 km^{2} (771 mi^{2})

Basin features
- River system: Pearl River

The Wudu River (simplified Chinese: 乌都河; traditional Chinese: 烏都河; pinyin: Wūdū Hé), also known as Suoqiao River (索桥河), Luoxi River (罗细河), Shangzhai River (上寨大河), Ban River (半河) and Gesuo River (格所河), is a tributary of the Beipan River in Panzhou, Guizhou, China. It flows northeast through the town of Danxia, emptying into the Beipan River at Niuguntang of Huaga Miao, Buyi and Yi Ethnic Township. It is 106 square kilometres (41 mi^{2}) long, draining an area of 1,997 square kilometres (771 sq mi).
