= Qidu railway station =

Railway station in Qidu, Keelung, Taiwan

Qidu 七堵

Chinese name
- Traditional Chinese: 七堵
Transcriptions
Standard Mandarin
- Hanyu Pinyin: Qīdǔ
- Bopomofo: ㄑㄧ ㄉㄨˇ
- Wade–Giles: C'hi¹tu³
Southern Min
- Tâi-lô: tshit-tóo

General information
- Location: 2-1 Dongxin St; Qidu District, Keelung; Taiwan
- Coordinates: 25.0931°N 121.7140°E
- System: Taiwan Railway railway station
- Line: Western Trunk line
- Distance: 6.0 km to Keelung
- Connections: Local bus

Construction
- Structure type: Ground level

Other information
- Station code: A03 (statistical)
- Classification: First class (Chinese: 一等)

History
- Opened: 20 October 1891
- Rebuilt: 25 October 2013

Passengers
- 12,489 daily (2024)

Services
Preceding station	Taiwan Railway	Following station
Badu towards Keelung	Western Trunk line	Baifu towards Pingtung
Location
- Location within Taiwan

Qidu (Chinese: 七堵; pinyin: Qīdǔ; Wade–Giles: C'hi¹tu³) is a railway station in Keelung, Taiwan served by the Taiwan Railway.

== History ==
The station was opened in 1891, during Qing rule. It serves the area of Qidu.

In Japanese rule, the station name was pronounced as Shichito in Japanese, then romanized as Chitu after World War II until 2003.

It is now the origin station for most of the southbound trains on the West Coast line, after the new station was completed in 2007.

== Around the station ==
- National Keelung Commercial & Industrial Vocational Senior High School (next to the station)
- Yang Ming Marine Transport Corporation headquarter office (300m to the west)
- Qidu Night Market (350m to the northeast)
- Qidu Railway Memorial Park (400m to the northeast)

== See also ==
- List of railway stations in Taiwan
