= Xizhi District =

District of New Taipei, Taiwan

Coordinates: 25°04′N 121°40′E

Xizhi 汐止區 Shiodome, Sijhih, Hsichih
- District
- Xizhi District
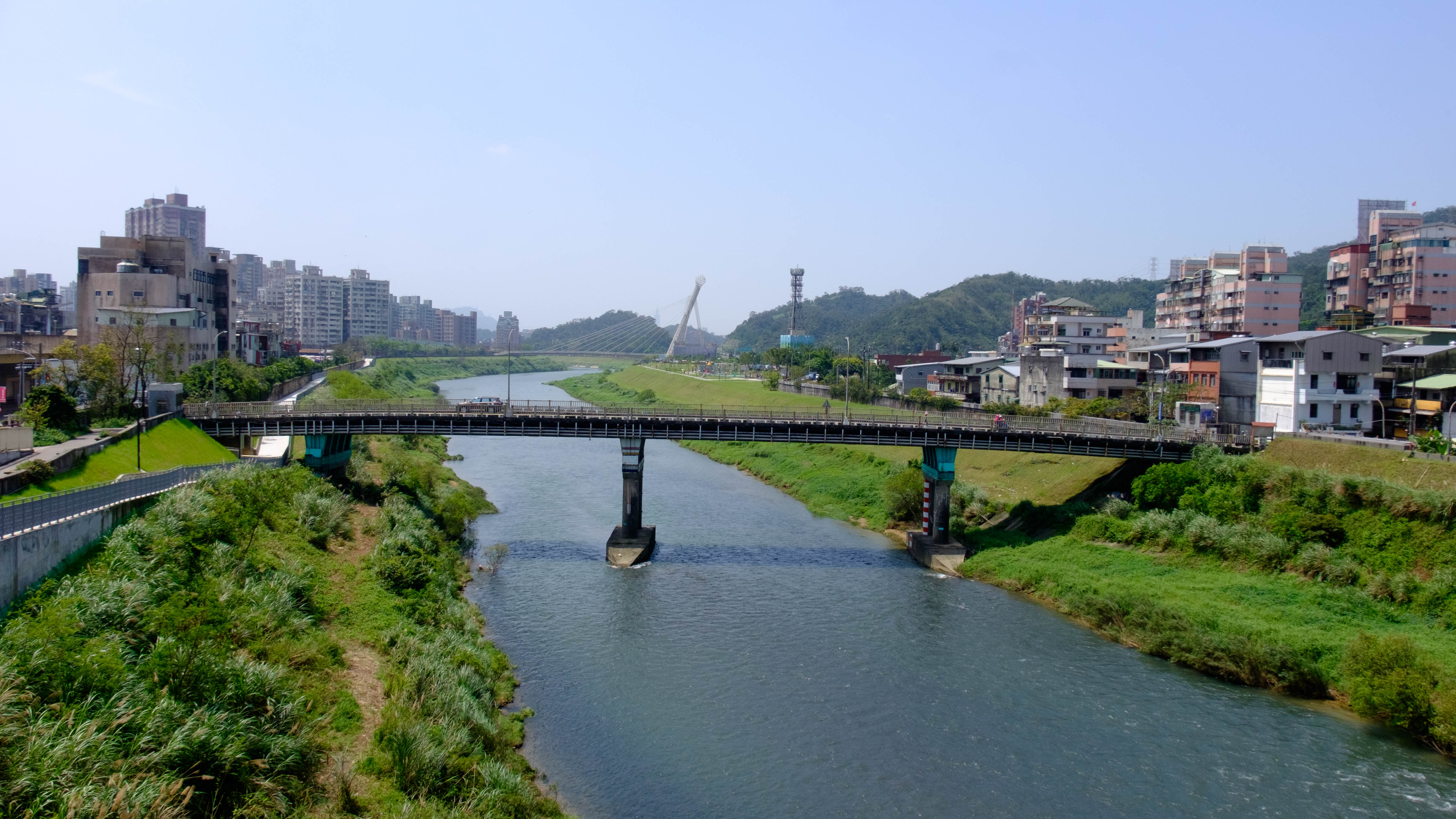
- Chang'an Bridge over the Keelung River in Xizhi District

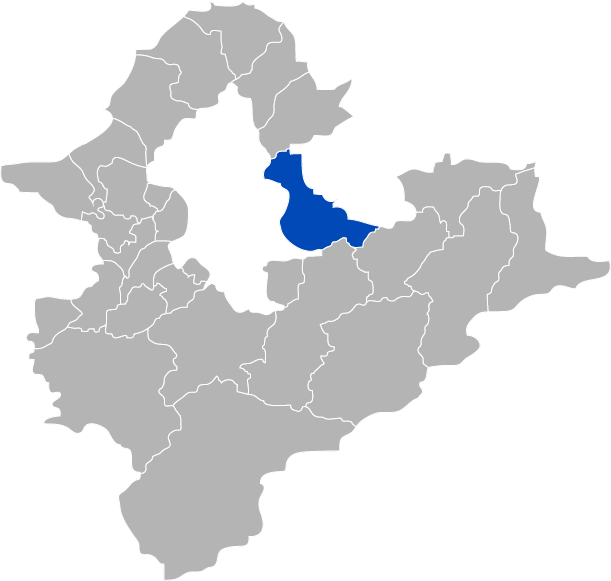
- Location of Xizhi in New Taipei
- Country: Taiwan
- Region: Northern Taiwan
- special municipality: New Taipei City

Area
  - Total: 71.2354 km^{2} (27.5041 sq mi)

Population (February 2023)
  - Total: 207,004
- Time zone: UTC+8 (CST)
- Website: www.xizhi.ntpc.gov.tw (in Chinese)

Xizhi District

Chinese name
- Traditional Chinese: 汐止區
- Literal meaning: the end of tides
Transcriptions
Standard Mandarin
- Hanyu Pinyin: Xìzhĭ Qū
- Wade–Giles: Hsi^{4}-chih^{3} Ch'ü^{1}
- Tongyong Pinyin: Sìjhĭh Cyu
Southern Min
- Hokkien POJ: Se̍k-chí-khu
- Tâi-lô: Si̍k-tsí-khu

Japanese name
- Kanji: 汐止
- Kana: しおどめ
Transcriptions
- Romanization: Shiodome

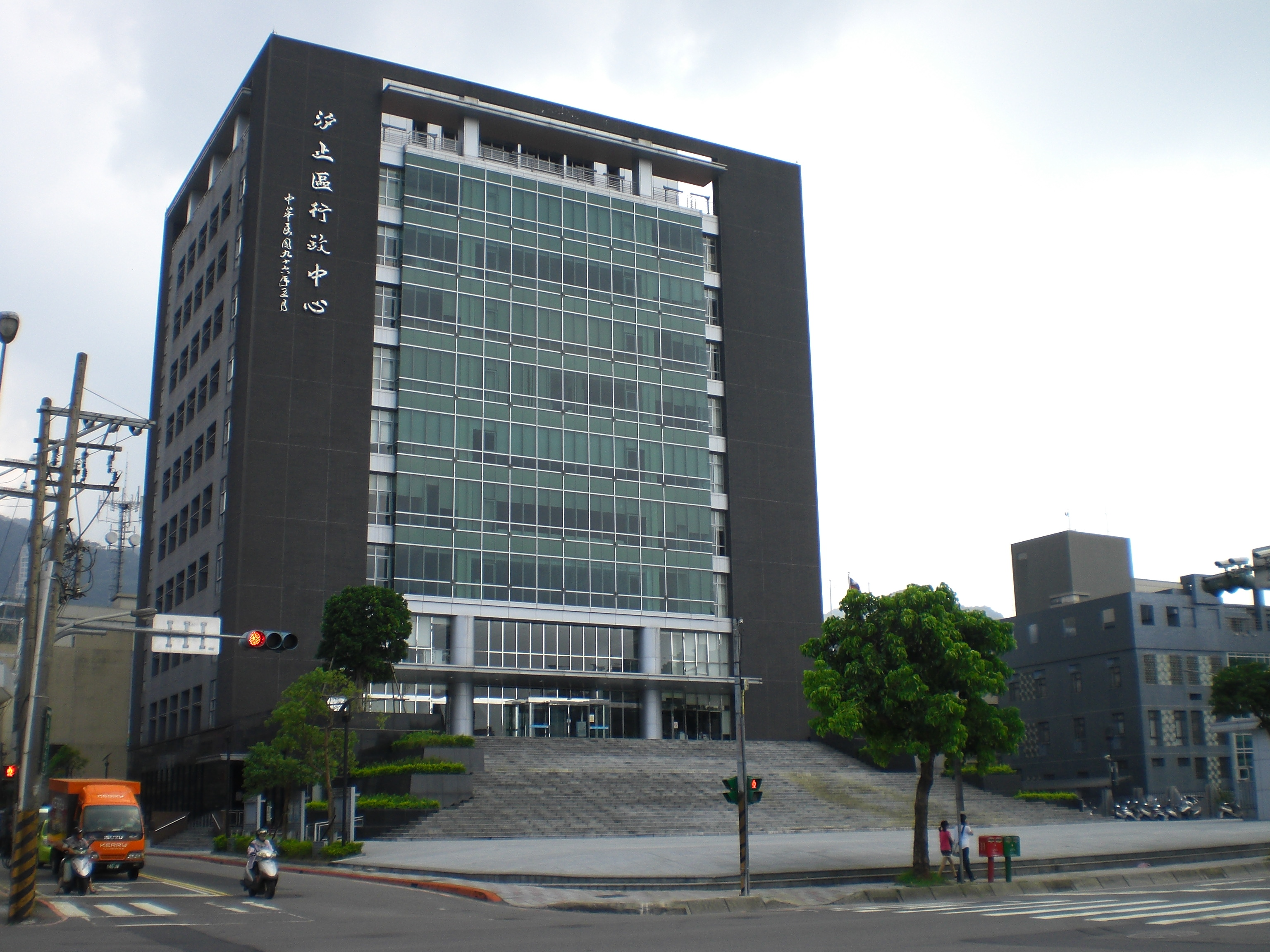
Xizhi District office

Xizhi (Chinese: 汐止區; pinyin: Xìzhǐ Qū; Pe̍h-ōe-jī: Se̍k-chí khu) is an inner city district in eastern New Taipei City in northern Taiwan, and is located between Taipei City and Keelung City. Compared to most districts in eastern New Taipei, which are very sparsely populated, Xizhi is one of the more populated districts in New Taipei, with a population of 207,004 people as of February 2023.

Xizhi grew quickly during the 1980s and 1990s, and is home to many of Taiwan's major electronics companies, such as Acer, Garmin (Asia), Coiler, Lanner Electronics, Wistron and DFI.

== Name origin ==
The district's old name Tsui-tng-ka (Chinese: 水返腳; Pe̍h-ōe-jī: Chúi-tińg-kha; lit. 'water returning site') refers to the fact that the tide from the Keelung River stops at Xizhi and goes back to the sea. During Japanese rule, the place name was changed to Shiodome (汐止; literally 'end of tides') and was under Shichisei District, Taihoku Prefecture. This is the source of the current name.

== History ==
The area was originally called Kypanas (Basay: Kippanas) (峯仔峙社; Phang-á-sī-siā) by the indigenous Ketagalan people.

In 1758, Han immigrants built a settlement (峯仔峙莊; Phang-á-sī-chng) near the area.

In 1920, during the Japanese rule, the place was organized as Shiodome Town, Shichisei District, Taihoku Prefecture.

After the handover of Taiwan from Japan to the Republic of China, Xizhi was established as an urban township of Taipei County. It was upgraded to a county-administered city on 1 July 1999. On 25 December 2010, it became a district of New Taipei City.

== Geography and location ==
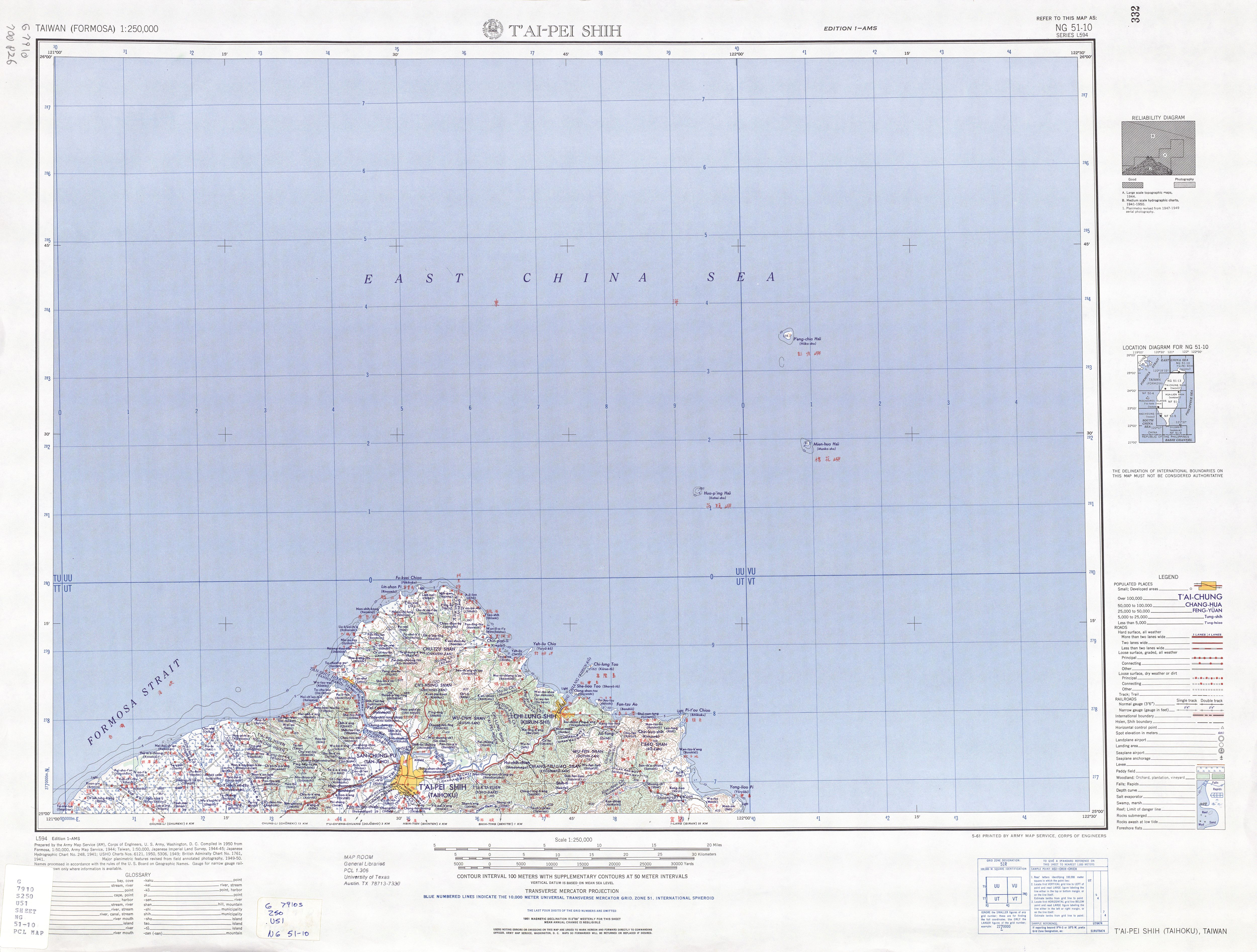
Map including Xizhi (labeled as Hsi-chih-chieh (Shiodomegai) 汐止街) (1950)

Xizhi is located in the Keelung River valley between Taipei and Keelung, which is an important transportation corridor. The old Jukando Highway and Jukan Railway Line (縱貫線) passed through here during the Japanese period. Currently both north–south freeways (National Highway 1 and National Highway 3) as well as the West Coast Line railroad pass through Xizhi.

A Taipei Metro (Taipei Rapid Transit System) route and MRT Keelung Line are planned for Xizhi.

Xizhi suffered from periodic flooding due to typhoons, before a levee was completed along the Keelung River in 2002.

== Economy ==
Many of Taiwan's electronics companies are headquartered in Xizhi, such as:

- Acer Group, an international computer company
- Coiler Corporation, a telecommunications company
- Lanner Electronics Inc., a company making computer parts, network appliance platforms, and motherboards
- DFI (Diamond Flower Inc.), a company making computer motherboards

Garmin's largest operating subsidiary, Garmin (Asia) Corporation, has its main office in Xizhi District.

Matsusei, a Taiwanese supermarket chain, also has its headquarters in Xizhi.

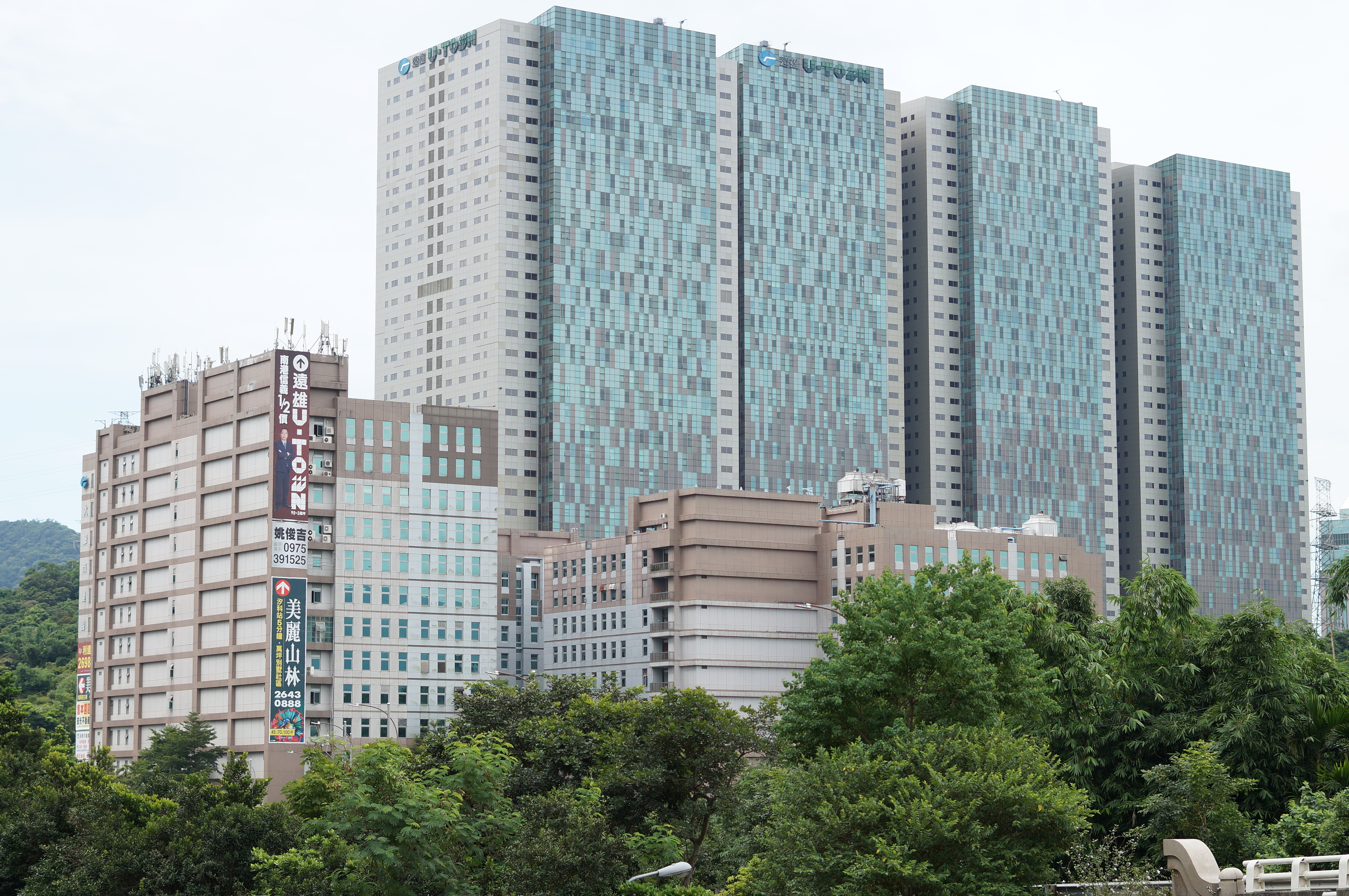
Farglory U-Town

Farglory U-Town, a commerce center with multiple functions, such as entertainment, business, and dining areas, was built by Farglory Group (遠雄企業), and was completed at the end of 2014. It is located in one of the most convenient and centralized areas of the whole Xizhi District. Around U-Town, there are hypermarkets, such as Carrefour and Costco, international computer companies, such as Acer, and retailer of consumer electronics and entertainment software, such as TK3C. There are 1482 units in total within 37 stories along with underground 7 floors. Among those units, B1 is designed as a public food court, 1F~3F house international designers branding department store, and 4F is a fitness center. The remaining floors also include the lobby, Farglory Museum, a spa, swimming pool, business meeting rooms as well as offices.

Before several electronic companies moved to Xizhi, the district, like the nearby Pinglin, was known for the production of Baozhong tea.

== Tourist attractions ==
- Wuzhi Mountain Military Cemetery
- Xizhi Gongbei Temple

== Transportation ==
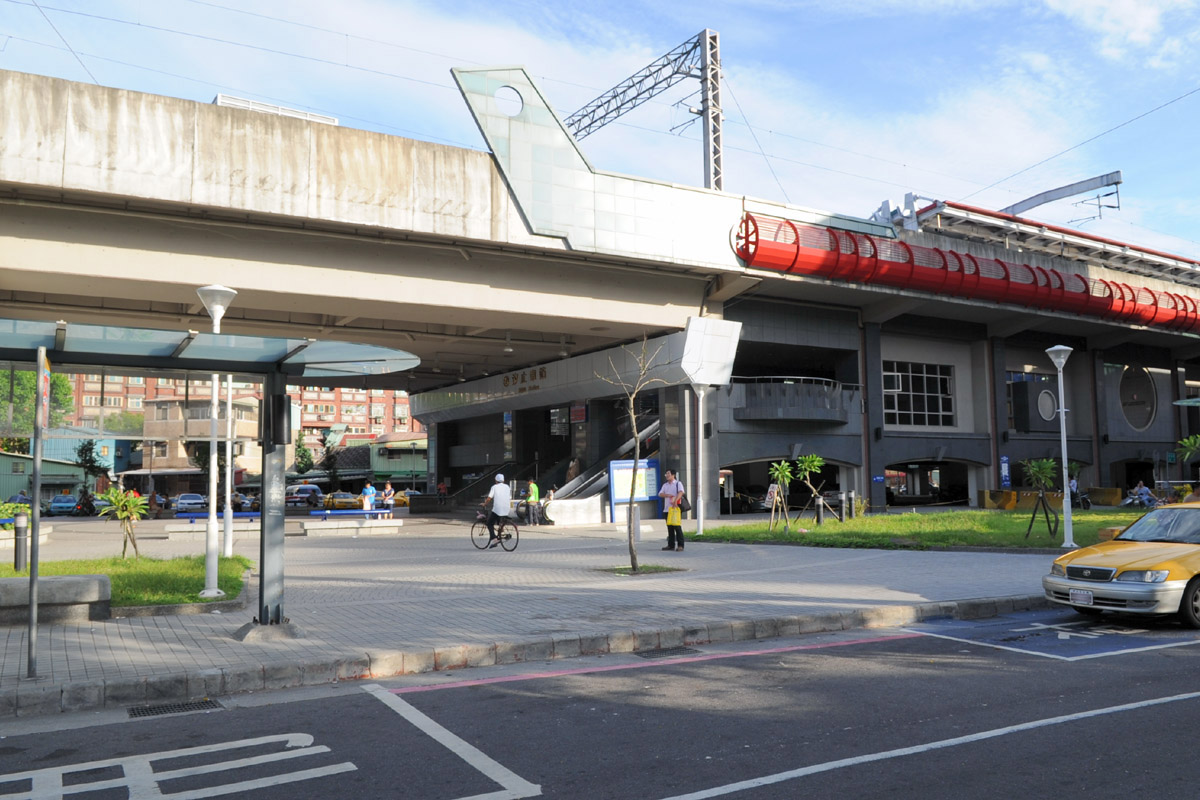
Xizhi Rail Station

- TR Wudu Station
- TR Xizhi Station
- TR Xike Station

Planned (Taipei Metro Minsheng–Xizhi line)

- Metro Taipei Zhangshuwan station
- Metro Taipei Xizhi Tech. Park station
- Metro Taipei Xizhi station
- MRT Keelung Line Nanyang Brdg. station
- MRT Keelung Line Jiadongjiao station
- MRT Keelung Line Baozhangkeng station

== Notable natives ==
- Chen Zhiqi, painter
- Huang Kuo-chang, leader of the New Power Party (2015–2019)
- Shen Fa-hui, member of the Legislative Yuan (2005–2008)
- Yang Chao-hsiang, Minister of Education (1999–2000)
- The Hsichih Trio

== See also ==
- New Taipei City
