= Baifu railway station =

Railway station in Keelung, Taiwan

Baifu Station 百福
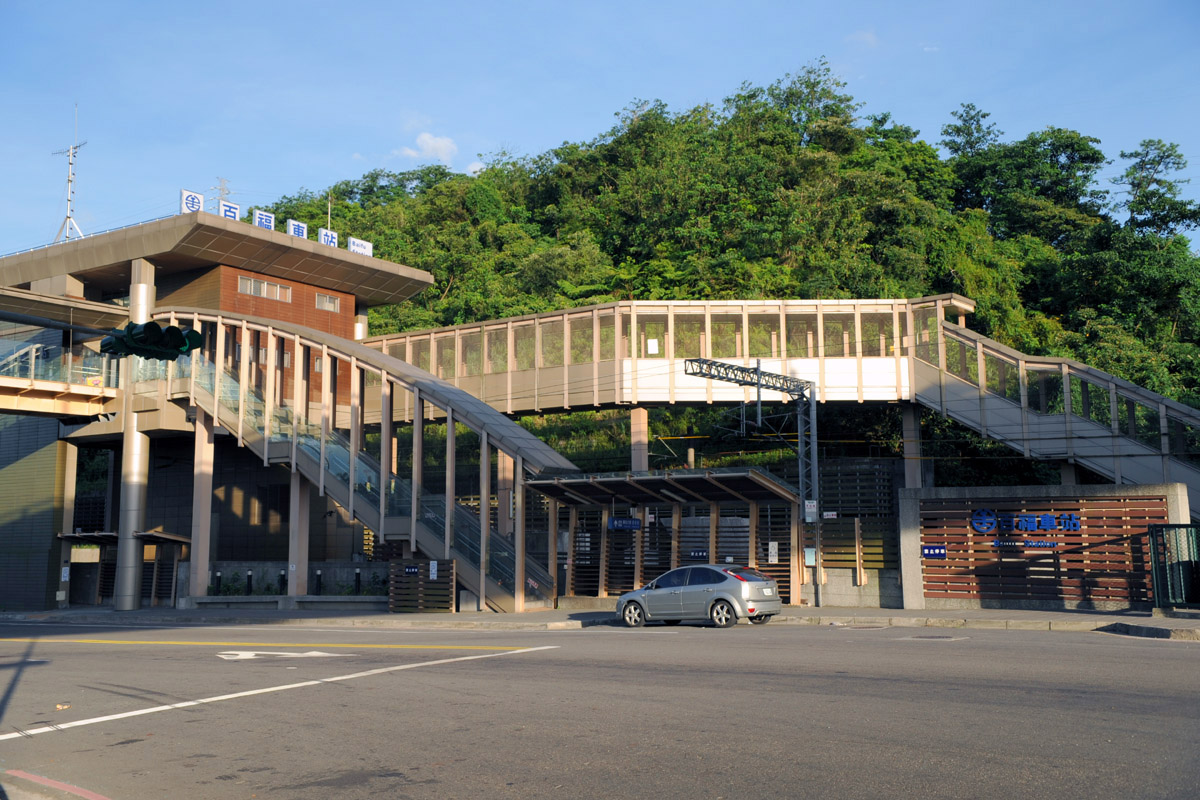

General information
- Location: Qidu, Keelung, Taiwan
- Coordinates: 25.078058°N 121.693483°E
- System: Train station
- Owner: Taiwan Railway Corporation
- Operator: Taiwan Railway Corporation
- Line: Western Trunk line
- Distance: 8.7 km from Keelung
- Platforms: 1 island platform, 1 side platform
- Train operators: Taiwan Railway Corporation

Construction
- Structure type: Elevated

History
- Opened: 8 May 2007

Passengers
- 5,221 daily (2024)

Services
Preceding station	Taiwan Railway	Following station
Qidu towards Keelung	Western Trunk line	Wudu towards Pingtung
Location

Baifu (traditional Chinese: 百福車站; simplified Chinese: 百福车站; pinyin: Bǎifú Chēzhàn) is a railway station on Taiwan Railway West Coast line located in Qidu District, Keelung City, Taiwan.

== History ==
The station was built as a result of TRA's policy of transforming its railroad lines into an MRT-type railroad. The construction of the station was started on 23 June 2005, and it was opened for public use on 8 May 2007.

The station is mostly used by commuters traveling to and from Keelung and Taipei, and the only trains that stop here are the local trains.

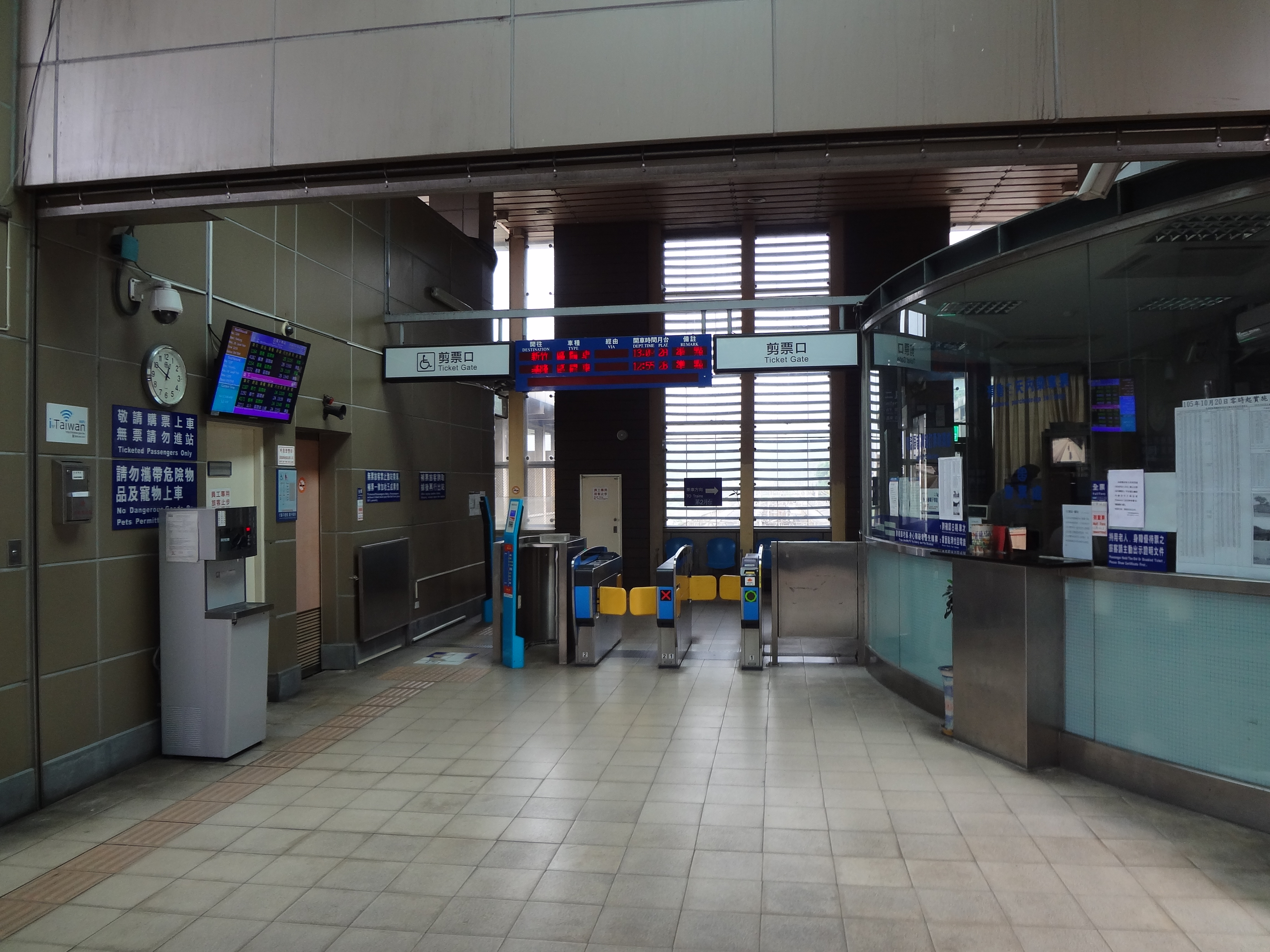
Station hall of Baifu station

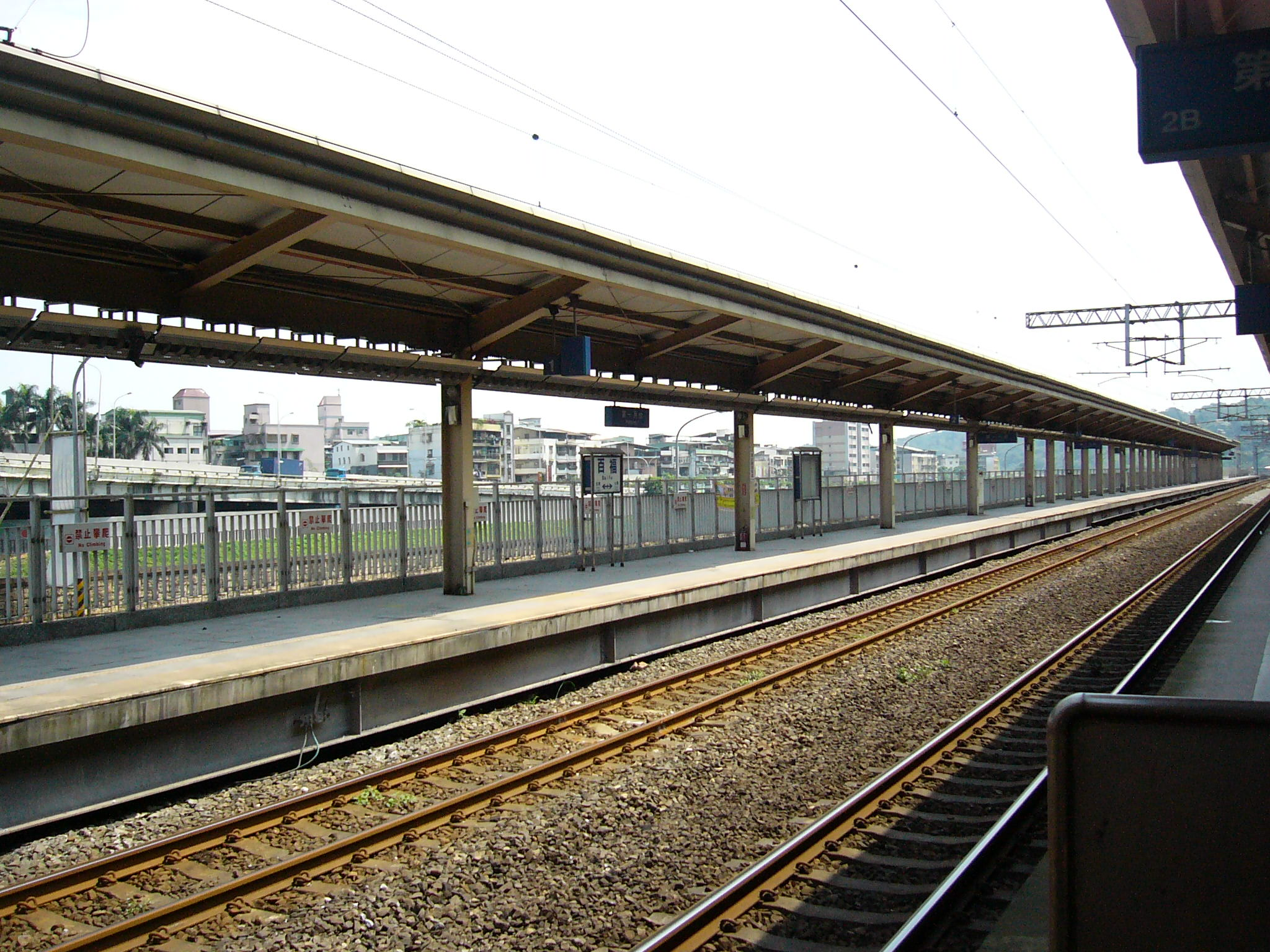
Platform 1 of Baifu station

== See also ==
- List of railway stations in Taiwan
