= Wudu railway station =

Railway station located in New Taipei, Taiwan

Wudu 五堵
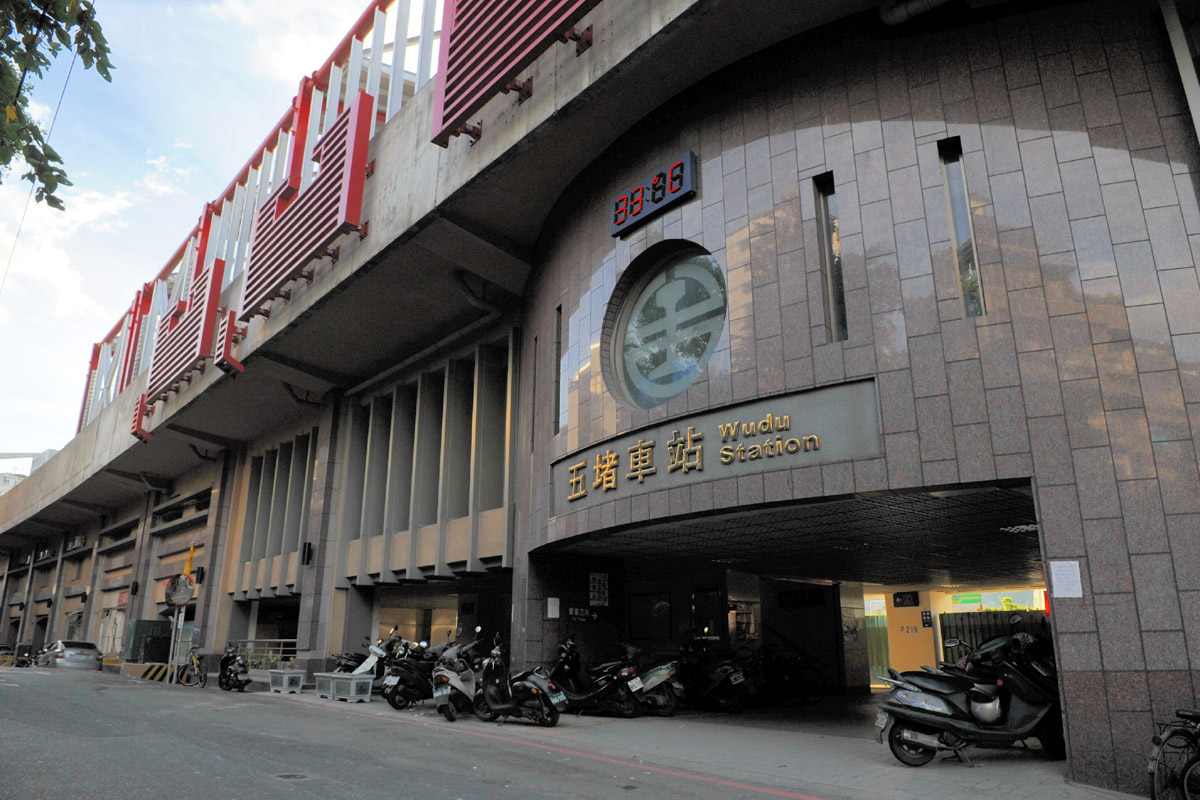

General information
- Location: 17 Changan Rd. Xizhi, New Taipei; Taiwan
- Coordinates: 25.077864°N 121.667628°E
- Operated by: Taiwan Railway Corporation
- Line: Western Trunk line
- Distance: 11.7 km from Keelung
- Platforms: 1 Island platform, 1 side platform

Construction
- Structure type: Elevated

History
- Opened: 1 June 1902

Passengers
- 4,386 daily (2024)

Services
| Preceding station | Taiwan Railway | Following station |
|---|---|---|
| Baifu towards Keelung | Western Trunk line | Xizhi towards Pingtung |
Location

Wudu (traditional Chinese: 五堵車站; simplified Chinese: 五堵车站; pinyin: Wǔdǔ Chēzhàn) is a railway station on Taiwan Railway West Coast line located in Xizhi District, New Taipei, Taiwan.

== History ==
The station was opened on 1 June 1902, during Japanese rule. The station is now mostly used by commuters to and from Keelung and Taipei, and the only trains that stop here are the local trains.

== See also ==
- List of railway stations in Taiwan
