= Minsheng–Xizhi Line =

Planning MRT route in Taipei

Overview
- Native name: 民生汐止線
- Locale: Taipei and New Taipei, Taiwan
- Termini: Dadaocheng; Xizhi District Office
- Stations: 15
- Color on map: Sky blue

Service
- Type: Rapid transit
- Operator: New Taipei Metro Corporation
- Depot: Xizhi Depot

Technical
- Line length: 17 km (10.6 mi)
- Character: Underground, elevated
- Track gauge: 1,435 mm (4 ft 8 1/2 in) standard gauge

The Minsheng–Xizhi Line (Chinese: 民生汐止線; code SB) is a planned line on the New Taipei Metro. Its stations abbreviate as "SBXX," with XX being the station number (i.e. SB13).

== Stations ==
Code	Station name		Transfer	Districts	City
Code	English	Chinese	Transfer	Districts	City
SB01	Dadaocheng	大稻埕		Datong	Taipei
SB02	Shuanglian	雙連	R12	Datong, Zhongshan	Taipei
SB03	Xingtian Temple	行天宮	O09	Zhongshan	Taipei
SB04	NTPU Taipei Campus	北大台北校區	Zhongshan Junior High School (out-of-station)	Zhongshan	Taipei
SB05	Dongshe	東社		Songshan	Taipei
SB06	Minsheng Community	民生社區		Songshan	Taipei
SB07	Jiulizu	舊里族	(Y38)	Neihu	Taipei
SB08	Wanzi	灣仔		Neihu	Taipei
SB09	Huluzhou	葫蘆洲		Neihu	Taipei
SB10	Donghu	東湖	BR22	Neihu	Taipei
SB11	Xiashehou	下社后		Xizhi	New Taipei
SB12	Shehou	社后		Xizhi	New Taipei
SB13	Zhangshuwan	樟樹灣	Keelung Mass Rapid Transit (Planning)	Xizhi	New Taipei
SB14	Xike	汐科	Xike; Keelung Mass Rapid Transit (Planning)	Xizhi	New Taipei
SB15	Xizhi District Office	汐止區公所	Keelung Mass Rapid Transit (Planning)	Xizhi	New Taipei

- Note: all station names are only possible names.

== History ==
- December 2007: A corridor study was completed.
- 15 November 2013: The Department of Rapid Transit Systems held a public hearing regarding the line's planning.
- 21 October 2014: Early works commenced.
