= Xizhi railway station =

Railway station in New Taipei, Taiwan

Xizhi 汐止
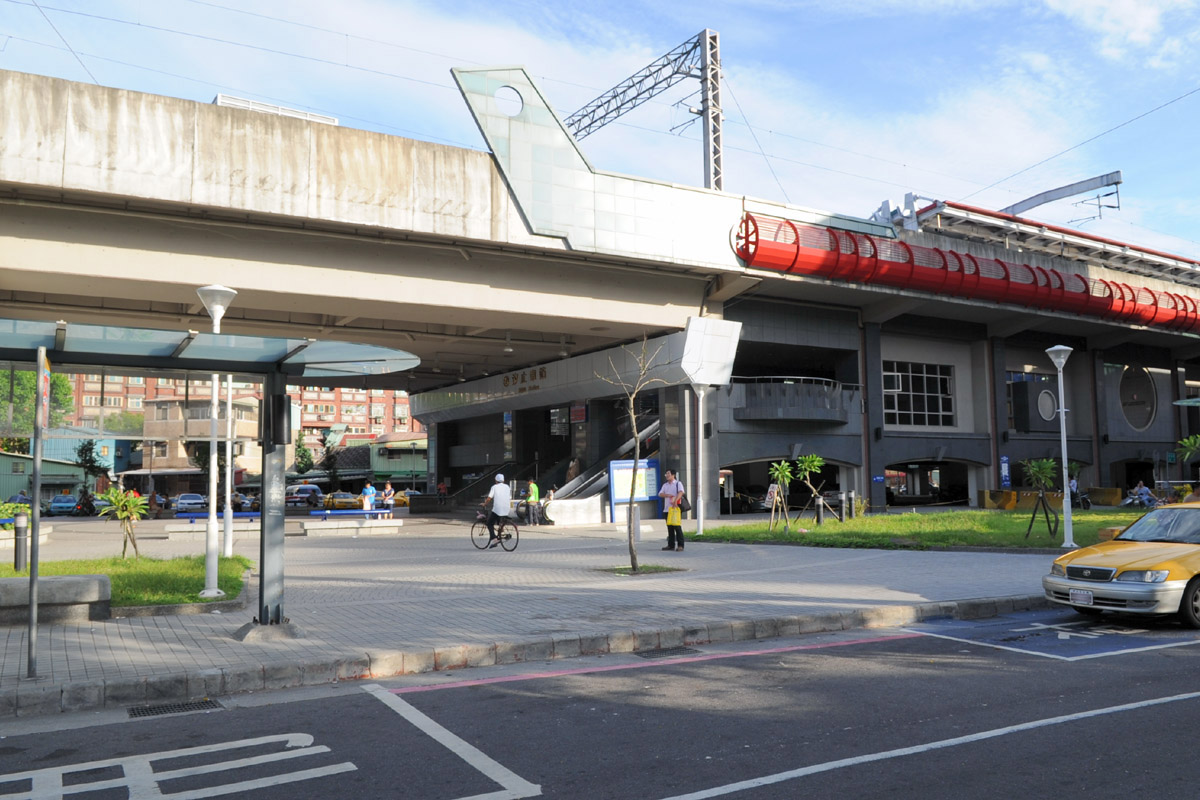

Chinese name
- Traditional Chinese: 汐止
- Literal meaning: Tide stops
Transcriptions
Standard Mandarin
- Hanyu Pinyin: Xìzhǐ
- Bopomofo: ㄒㄧˋ ㄓˇ
- Wade–Giles: Hsi⁴chih³
Southern Min
- Tâi-lô: Sı̍k-tsí

General information
- Location: 1 Xinyi Rd; Xizhi District, New Taipei; Taiwan
- Coordinates: 25.0680°N 121.6614°E
- System: Taiwan Railway railway station
- Line: Western Trunk line
- Distance: 13.1 km to Keelung
- Connections: Local bus; Coach

Construction
- Structure type: Elevated

Other information
- Station code: A06 (statistical)
- Classification: Second class (Chinese: 二等)

History
- Opened: 20 October 1891
- Rebuilt: 9 April 2006
- Electrified: 9 January 1978

Passengers
- 21,780 daily (2024)

Services
| Preceding station | Taiwan Railway | Following station |
|---|---|---|
| Wudu towards Keelung | Western Trunk line | Xike towards Pingtung |
Location
- Location within Taiwan

Xizhi (Chinese: 汐止) is a railway station in Xizhi District, New Taipei, Taiwan served by Taiwan Railway.

== Overview ==
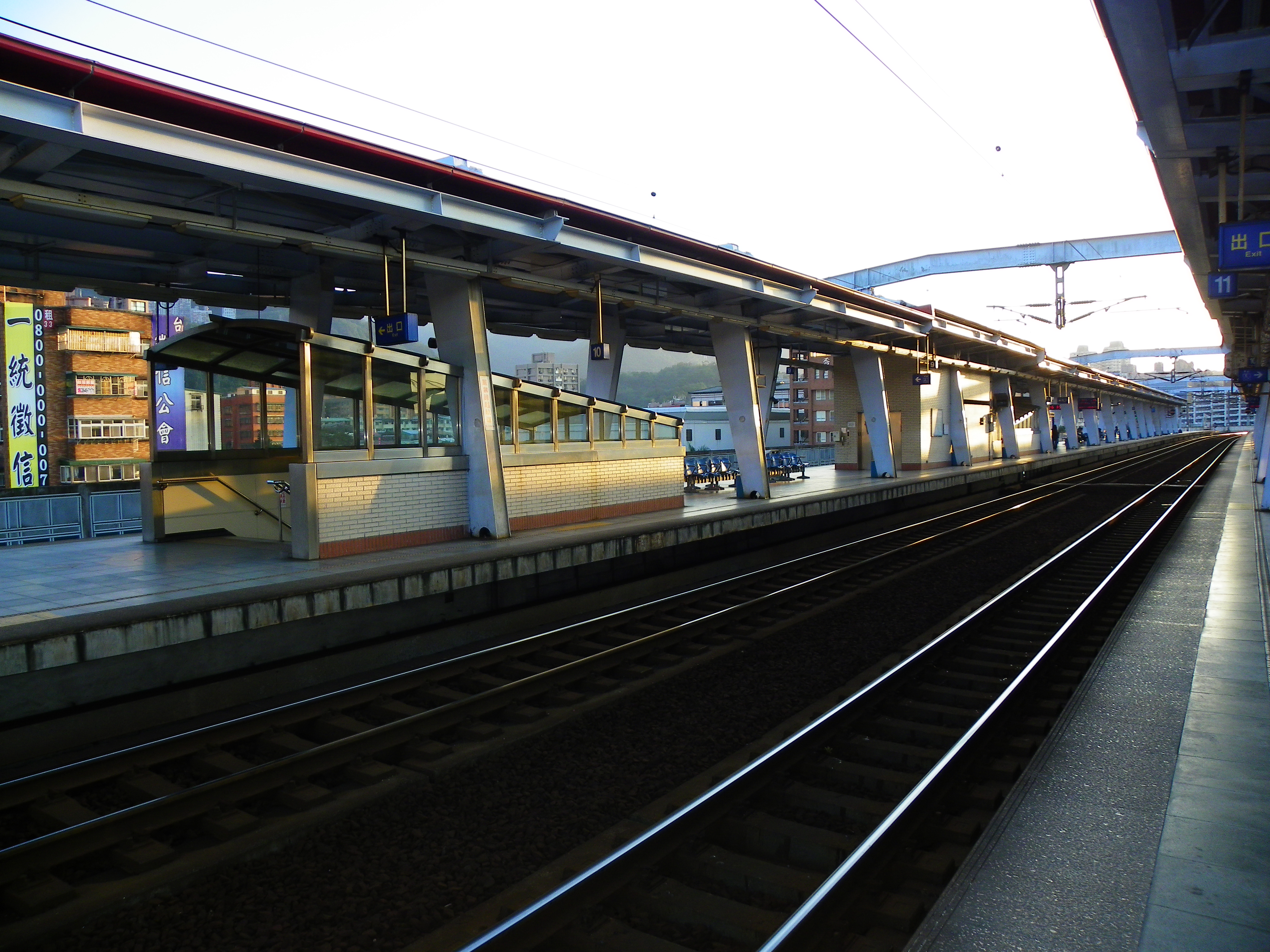
Xizhi Station platforms

The station has two island platforms.

=== History ===
- 20 October 1891: The station opened as Tsui-tng-ka Pier (Chinese: 水返腳碼頭).
- 1920 (during Japanese rule): The name was changed to Shiodome Station (Japanese: 汐止駅, Hepburn: Shiodome-eki).
- 1945: The name was changed to the current "Xizhi Station".
- 9 April 2006: Following the construction of the elevated station, the new tracks and station came into service.
- 1 August 2008: The station began accepting EasyCard as payment.

== Around the station ==
- Keelung River
- Xizhi District Office (350m to the southwest)
- Xiufeng High School (next to the station)
- Xizhi Old Street (200m to the northeast)
- Xizhi Night Market (200m to the southwest)
- Provincial Highway No. 5 (200m to the south)
- Shuifanjiao Park (250m to the north)

== See also ==
- List of railway stations in Taiwan
