= Qidu District =

District of Keelung, Taiwan

Coordinates: 25.111715°N 121.685203°E

Qidu 七堵區 Shichito, Cidu
- District
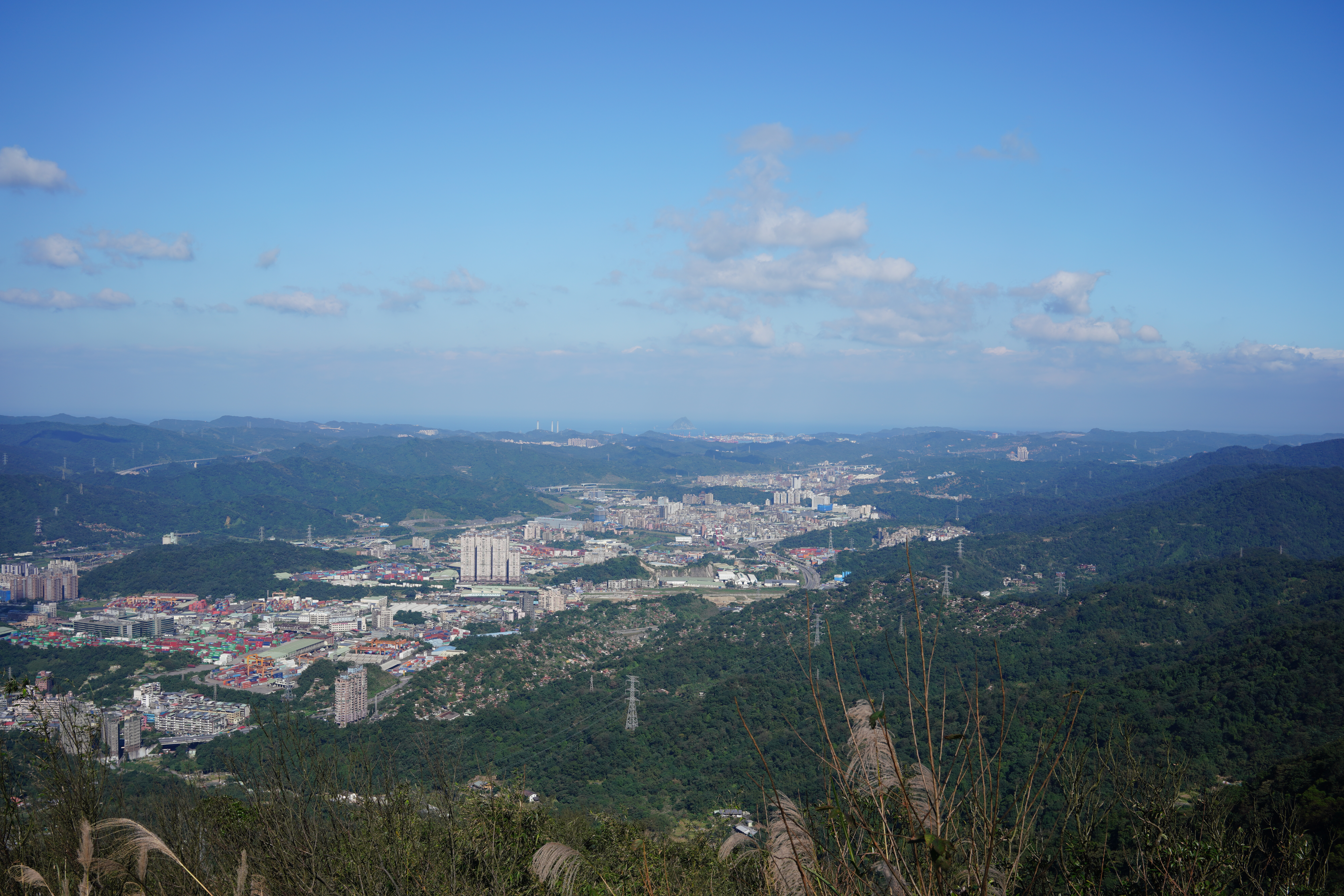

- Qidu District in Keelung City
- Location: Keelung, Taiwan
- Urban villages: 20

Government
  - Leader (區長): Lin Chin-Chen (林金鎮)

Area
  - Total: 56 km^{2} (22 sq mi)

Population (October 2023)
  - Total: 52,806
  - Density: 940/km^{2} (2,400/sq mi)
- Time zone: UTC+8 (National Standard Time)
- Postal code: 206
- Website: www.klct.klcg.gov.tw (in Chinese)

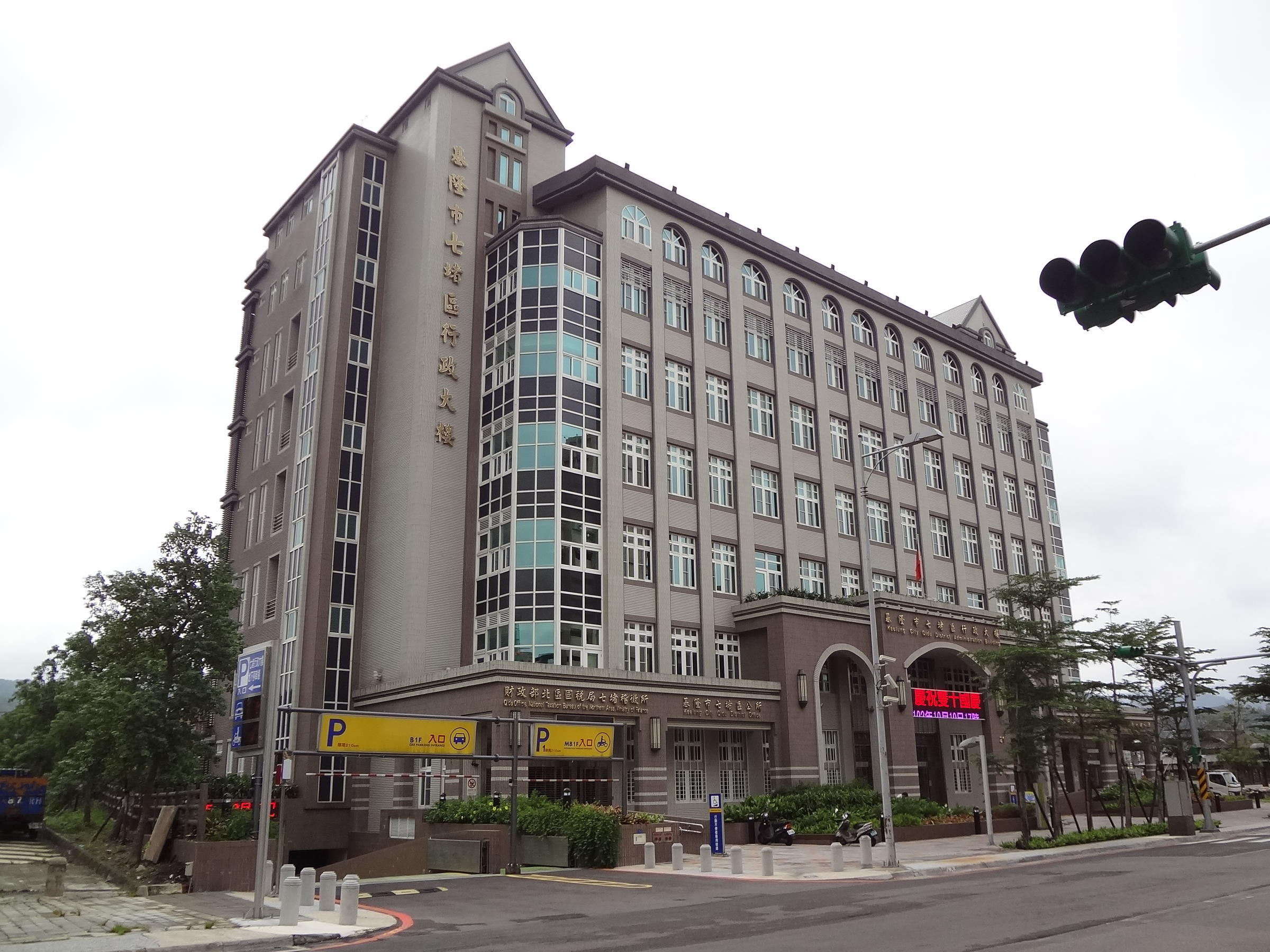
Qidu District Administration Building

Qidu District or Cidu District (Chinese: 七堵區; Hanyu Pinyin: Qīdǔ Qū; Tongyong Pinyin: Cidǔ Cyu; Wade–Giles: Ch'i^{1}-tu^{3} Chü^{1}; Pe̍h-ōe-jī: Chhit-tó͘-khu) is a district of the city of Keelung, Taiwan. It borders New Taipei to the west.

== History ==
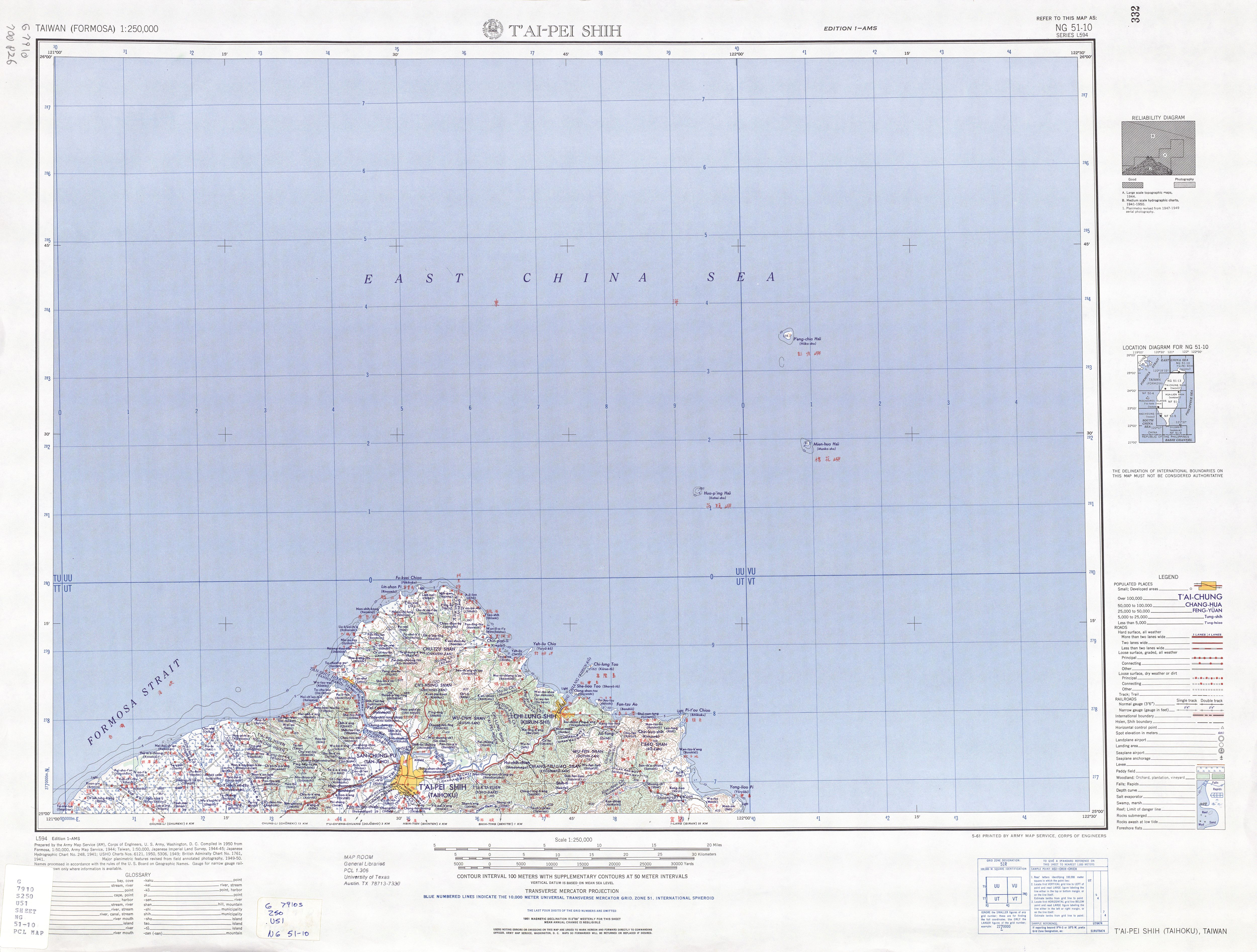
Map including Qidu (labeled as Ch'itu (Shichito) 七堵) (1950)

During the period of Japanese rule, Shichitoku village (七堵庄) included modern day Qidu and Nuannuan districts and was governed under Kīrun District (基隆郡) of Taihoku Prefecture.

In March 1988, the Keelung city government reassigned administration of several urban villages between districts. Ying-geh, Chi-sien, She-wei, San-min, Wu-fu and Liu-ho, originally part of Qidu District (Chi-du) became part of Anle District.

== Administrative divisions ==
The district administers 20 urban villages:

- Changxing/Changsing/Zhangxing (長興里), Zhengguang/Jhengguang (正光里), Fumin (富民里), Yongping (永平里), Yongan/Yong-an/Yong'an (永安里), Bade (八德里), Ziqiang/Zihciang/Zijiang (自強里), Liudu/Lioudu (六堵里), Taian/Tai-an/Tai'an (泰安里), Dubei (堵北里), Dunan (堵南里), Manan (瑪南里), Madong/Matung (瑪東里), Maxi/Masi (瑪西里), Youyi (友一里), Youer/You-er (友二里), Zhengming/Jhengming (正明里), Baifu/Bofu (百福里), Shijian/Shihjian (實踐里) and Changan/Zhangan Village (長安里).

== Tourist attractions ==
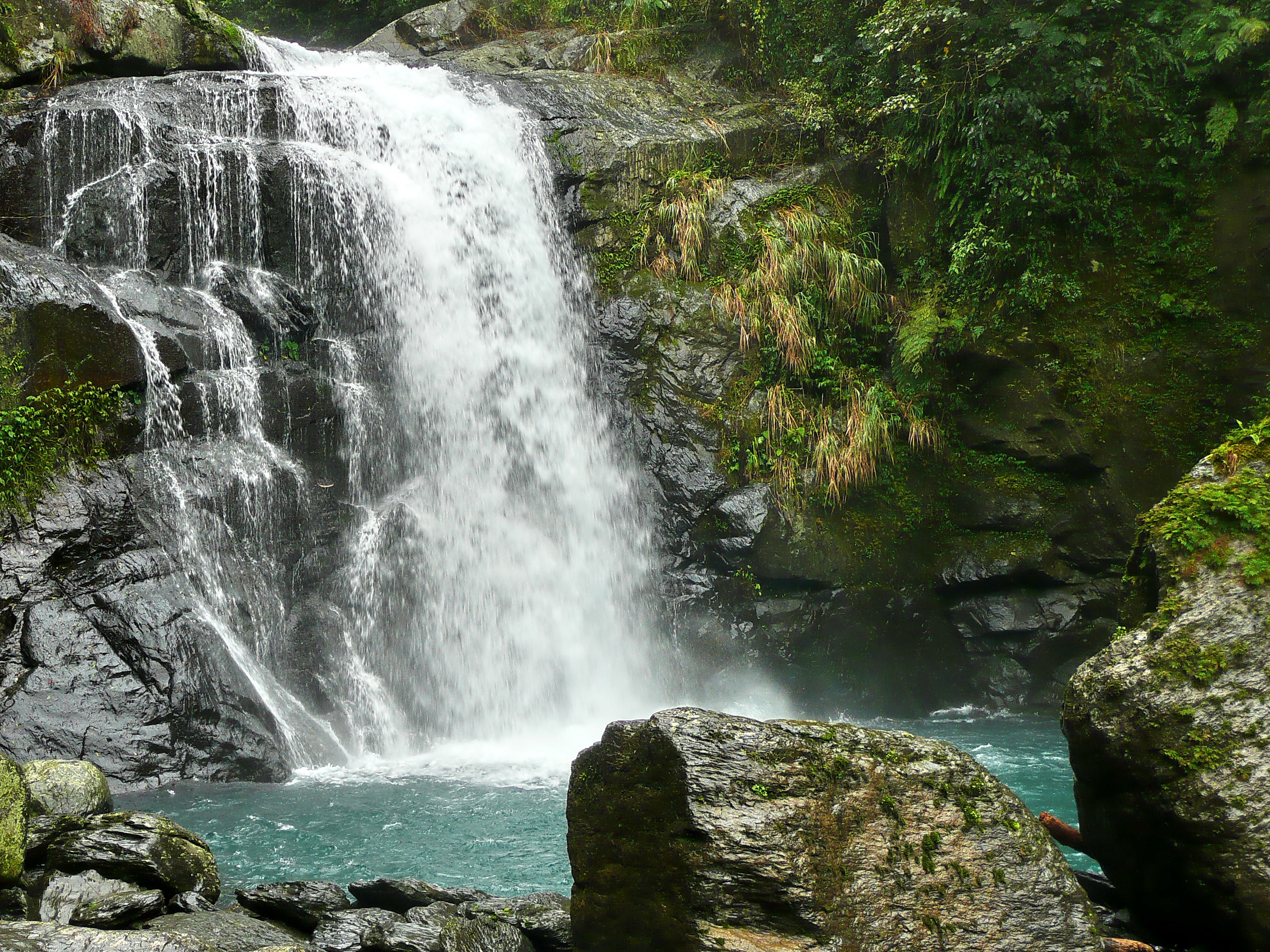
Tai-an Falls

- Tai-an Falls
- Yo-Ruai Stream

== Transportation ==
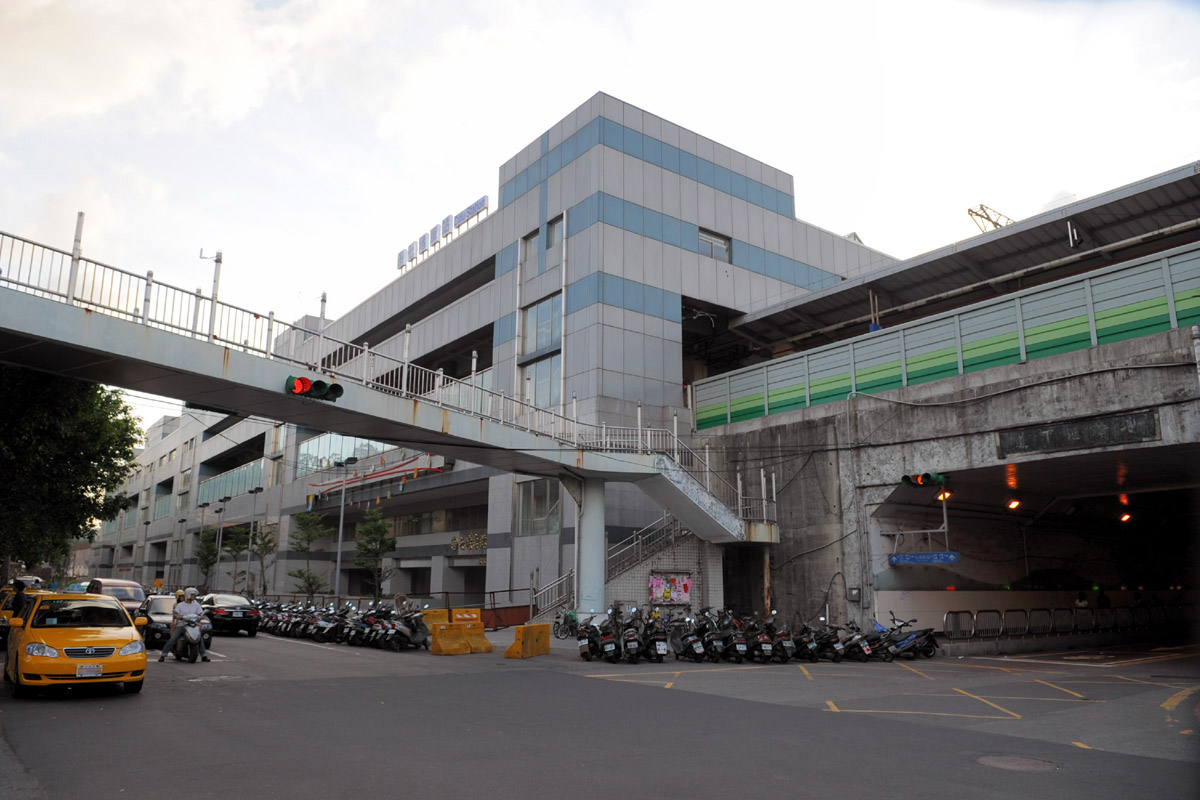
Qidu Station

- Taiwan Railway Baifu Station
- Taiwan Railway Qidu Station

== Notable natives ==
- Hsu Tsai-li, Mayor of Keelung City (2001–2007)
- Kao Chia-yu, member of Legislative Yuan

== See also ==
- Keelung
