= Guanshan =

Guanshan may refer to:

- Guanshan Subdistrict, a part of Hongshan District, Wuhan, Hubei, China
- Guanshan Village (官山村) in Xiangzikou, Ningxiang Prefecture, Hunan
- Guanshan, Taitung, an urban township in Taiwan
- Guanshan Waterfront Park, a park in Guanshan, Taitung, Taiwan
- Guanshan Riverside Park, a park along the Keelung River in Songshan, Taipei, Taiwan
- Mount Guan, a mountain in Taiwan
- Kwan Shan, a Hong Kong film actor
