= NIHS =

NIHS may refer to:

- Northern Islands High School, Wotje, Marshall Islands
- Norwood International High School, Adelaide, South Australia
- Taipei Municipal Nei-Hu Industrial High School, now Taipei Municipal Nei-Hu Vocational High School, Taiwan

== See also ==
- NIH (disambiguation)
