= Gangqian =

Gangqian may refer to:

- Gangqian Avenue (港前大道), an avenue in Nansha District, Guangzhou, Guangdong
- Gangqian metro station, a station of the Taipei Metro
