= Luye Highlands =

Highlands in Luye, Taitung County, Taiwan

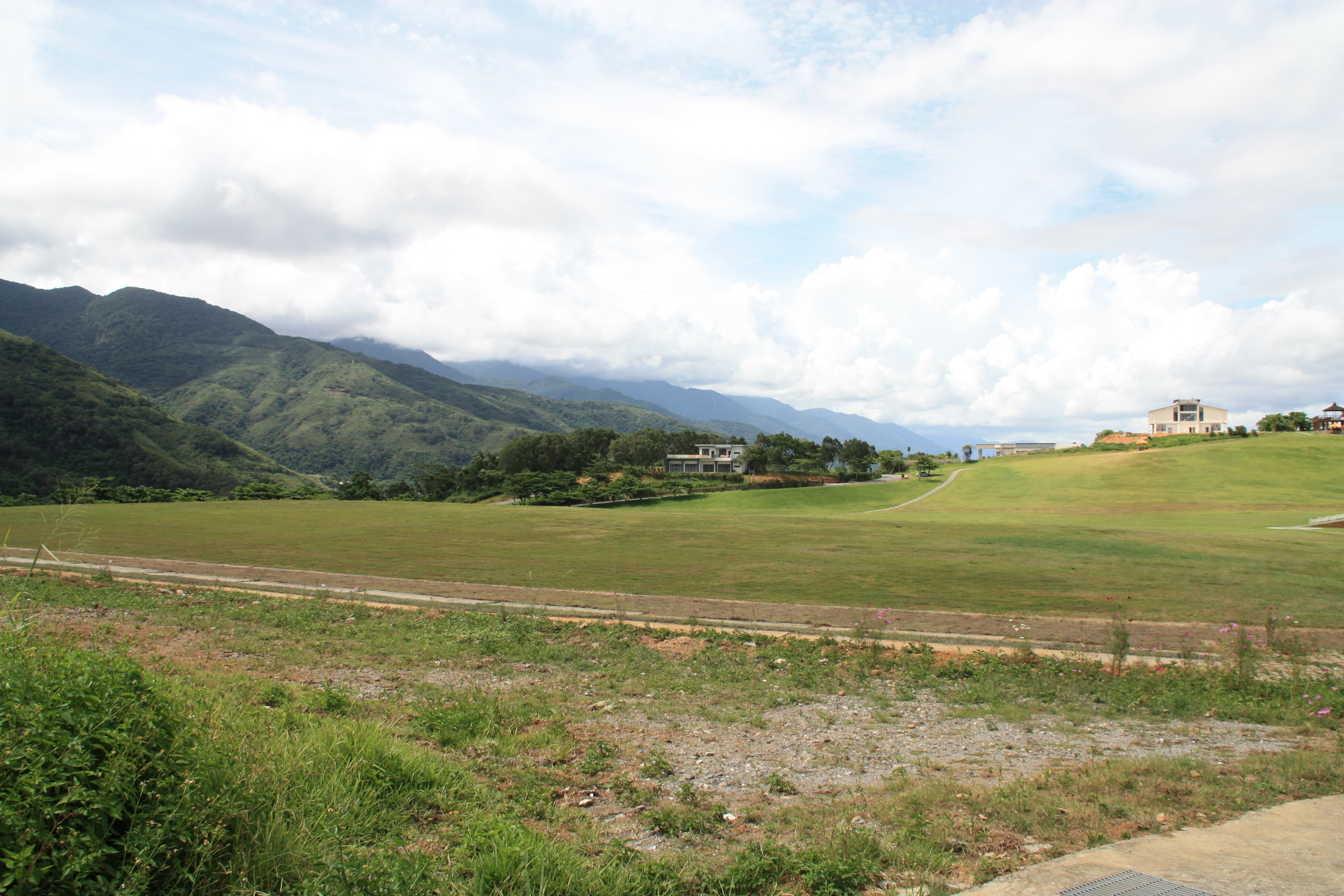

Highest point
- Elevation: 350 m (1,150 ft)
- Coordinates: 22°54′48.2″N 121°07′10.6″E

Naming
- Native name: 鹿野高臺 (Chinese)

Geography
- Location within Taitung County
- Location: Luye, Taitung County, Taiwan

The Luye Highlands (Chinese: 鹿野高台; pinyin: Lùyě Gāotái) are highlands close to Yong'an Village, Luye Township, Taitung County, Taiwan.

== History ==
The highland is famous for its hot air balloons and paragliding activities. The Taiwan International Balloon Fiesta has been held here annually since 2011.

== Geography ==
It has an average elevation of around 350 meters above sea level.

== Transportation ==
The highlands are accessible north west from Luye Station of Taiwan Railway.

== See also ==
- List of tourist attractions in Taiwan
