= Ruiyuan railway station =

Railway station located in Taitung, Taiwan

Ruiyuan Station 瑞源車站
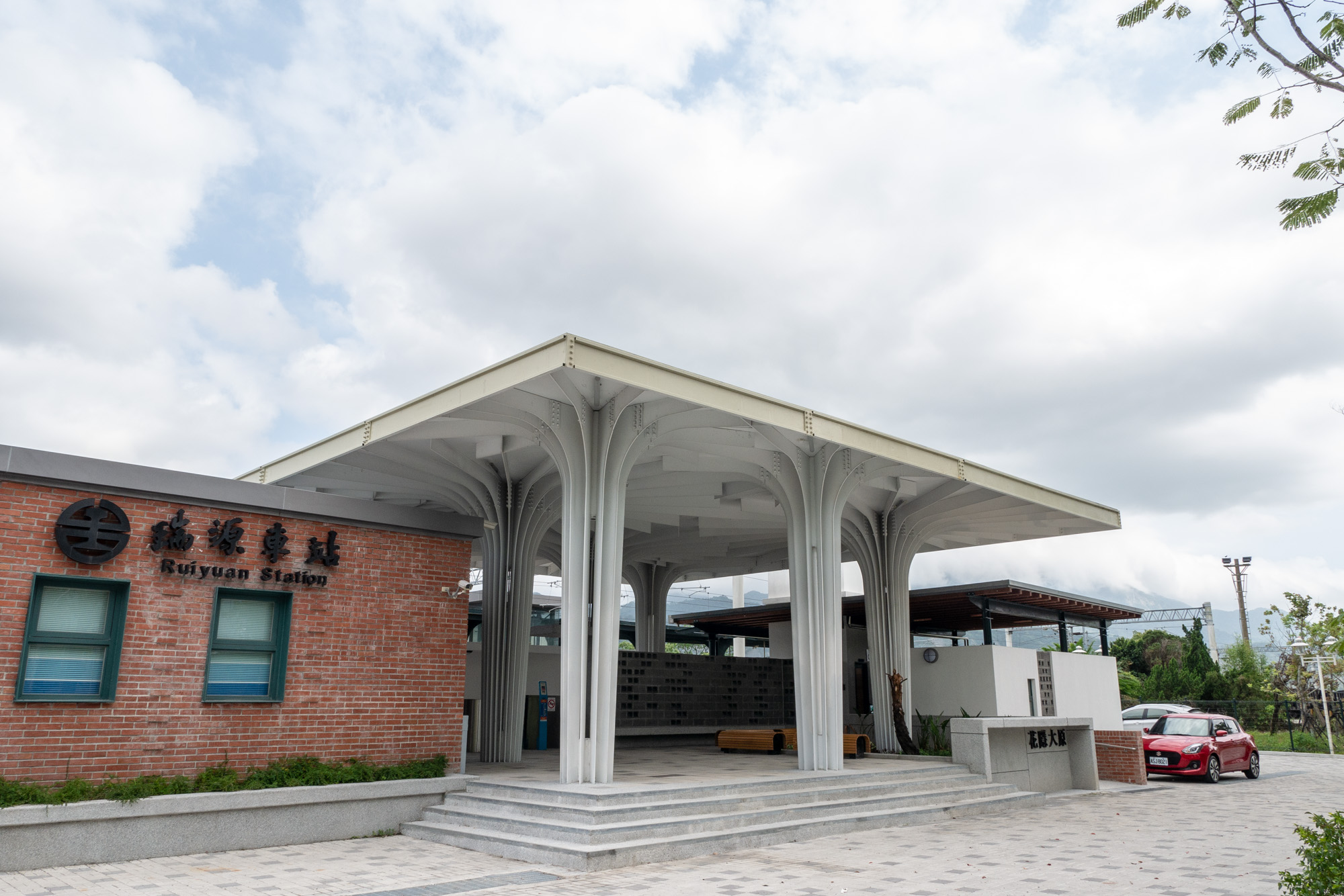
- Station entrance

Chinese name
- Traditional Chinese: 瑞源車站
Transcriptions
Standard Mandarin
- Hanyu Pinyin: Ruìyuán Chēzhàn
- Bopomofo: ㄖㄨㄟˋ ㄩㄢˊ ㄔㄜ ㄓㄢˋ

General information
- Location: Luye, Taitung; Taiwan
- Coordinates: 22°57′21.5″N 121°09′32.3″E
- System: Taiwan Railway railway station
- Line: Taitung line
- Distance: 131.1 km to Hualien
- Platforms: 1 island platform

Construction
- Structure type: At-grade

Other information
- Station code: 009

History
- Opened: 20 April 1922

Passengers
- 2022: 65 (daily)
- Rank: 205

Services
Preceding station	Taiwan Railway	Following station
Ruihe towards Badu	Eastern Trunk line	Luye towards Taitung
Location

Ruiyuan railway station (Chinese: 瑞源車站; pinyin: Ruìyuán Chēzhàn) is a railway station located in Luye Township, Taitung County, Taiwan. It is located on the Taitung line and is operated by Taiwan Railway.

== Surrounding area ==
- Beinan River
