= Bunun Cultural Museum =

Museum in Haiduan, Taitung County, Taiwan

Bunun Cultural Museum of Haituan Township
- 海端鄉布農族文化館
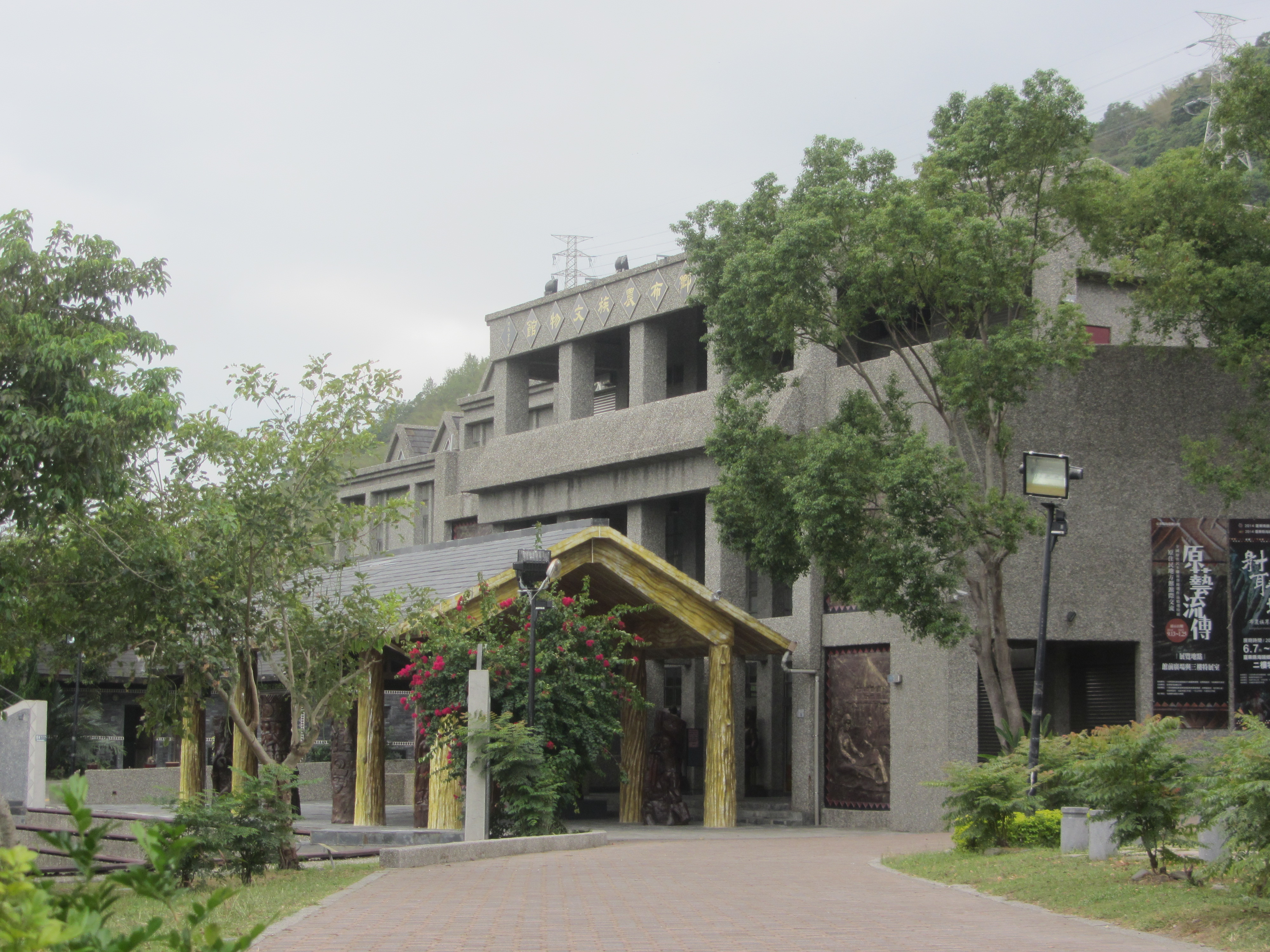
- Established: 2002
- Location: Haiduan, Taitung County, Taiwan
- Coordinates: 23°05′52.2″N 121°10′31.5″E
- Type: museum
- Management: Haiduan Township Office

The Bunun Cultural Museum (traditional Chinese: 布農族文化館; simplified Chinese: 布农族文化馆; pinyin: Bùnóng Zú Wénhuàguǎn) is a museum about Bunun people in Haiduan Township, Taitung County, Taiwan.

== History ==
The museum was established in 2002 due to the close connection between the township and the Bunun people. The museum establishment makes Haiduan the first indigenous township in Taiwan to construct a local museum.

== Architecture ==
The museum building consists of two floors. The ground floor is the tourist center of Southern Cross-Island Highway, while the upper floor is the Bunun Story House. There is also a performance area for Bunun tribal and cultural events at the outdoor area of the museum.

== Exhibitions ==
The museum exhibits wax sculptures of Bunun tribes people, embossment works and wood carvings. There are also many old photos being displayed.

== Transportation ==
The museum is accessible within walking distance south of Haiduan Station of Taiwan Railway.

== See also ==
- List of museums in Taiwan
- Taiwanese aborigines
