= Meiti Riverside Park =

Park in Zhongshan, Taipei, Taiwan

- 美堤河濱公園
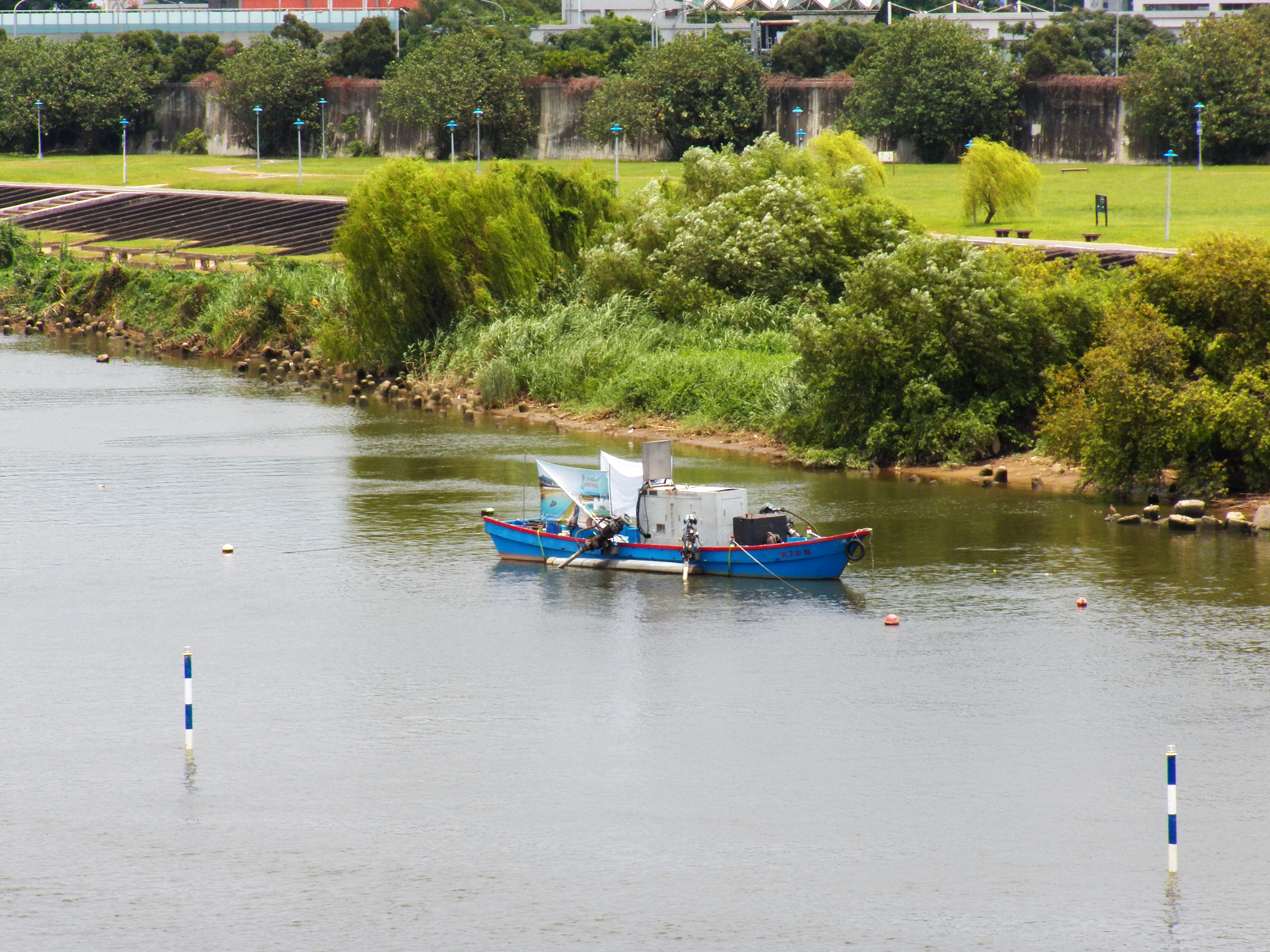
- Interactive map of Meiti Riverside Park
- Type: riverside park
- Location: Zhongshan, Taipei, Taiwan
- Coordinates: 25°04′30.8″N 121°33′38.7″E
- Area: 45.62 hectares (112.7 acres)
- Water: Keelung River
- Public transit: Xihu Station

The Meiti Riverside Park (traditional Chinese: 美堤河濱公園; simplified Chinese: 美堤河滨公园; pinyin: Měidī Hébīn Gōngyuán) is a waterfront park along the Keelung River in Zhongshan District, Taipei, Taiwan.

== Geography ==
The park spans over an area of 45.62 hectares which includes 4,608 m^{2} area of cosmos plants. It houses the Meiti Pier for transportation along Keelung River.

== Transportation ==
The park is accessible within walking distance south west from Xihu Station of Taipei Metro.

== See also ==
- List of parks in Taiwan
