= Xihu metro station =

Metro station in Taipei, Taiwan

Xihu 西湖
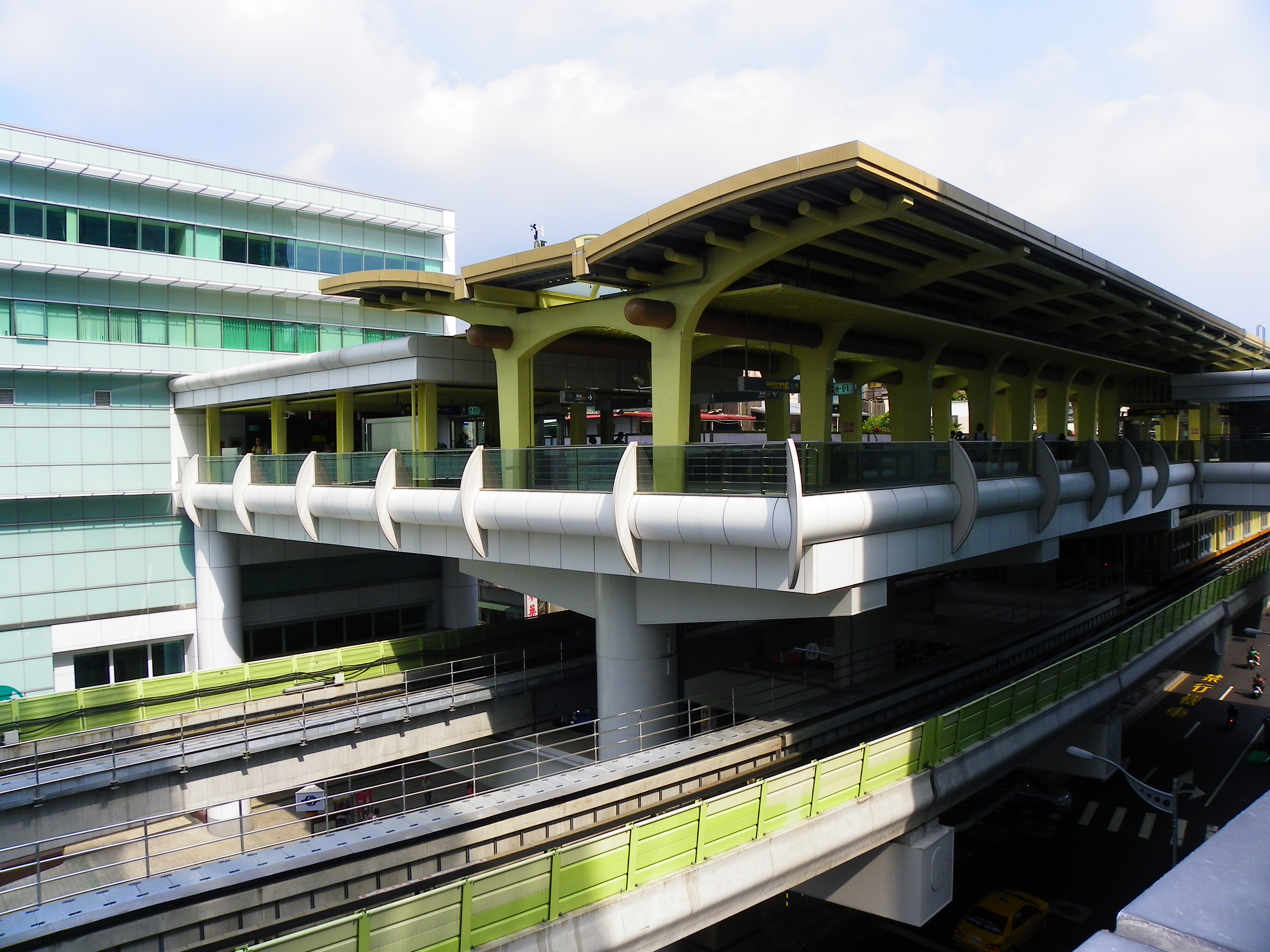
- Xihu Station's concourse is located above the platform level

Chinese name
- Chinese: 西湖
- Literal meaning: West lake
Transcriptions
Standard Mandarin
- Hanyu Pinyin: Xīhú
- Bopomofo: ㄒㄧ ㄏㄨˊ
- Wade–Giles: Hsi¹-hu²
Hakka
- Pha̍k-fa-sṳ: Sî-fù
Southern Min
- Tâi-lô: Se-ôo

General information
- Location: No. 256, Sec. 1, Neihu Rd. Neihu, Taipei; Taiwan
- Coordinates: 25.082074°N 121.566963°E
- Operator: Taipei Metro
- Line: Wenhu line
- Connections: Bus stop

Construction
- Structure type: Elevated

Other information
- Station code: BR16

History
- Opened: 4 July 2009

Passengers
- daily (December 2024)
- Rank: 53 out of 109

Services
Preceding station	Taipei Metro	Following station
Jiannan Road towards Taipei Zoo	Wenhu line	Gangqian towards Nangang Exhib Center
Location

The Taipei Metro Xihu station is located in the Neihu District in Taipei, Taiwan. It is a station on Wenhu line and opened on 4 July 2009.

== Station overview ==
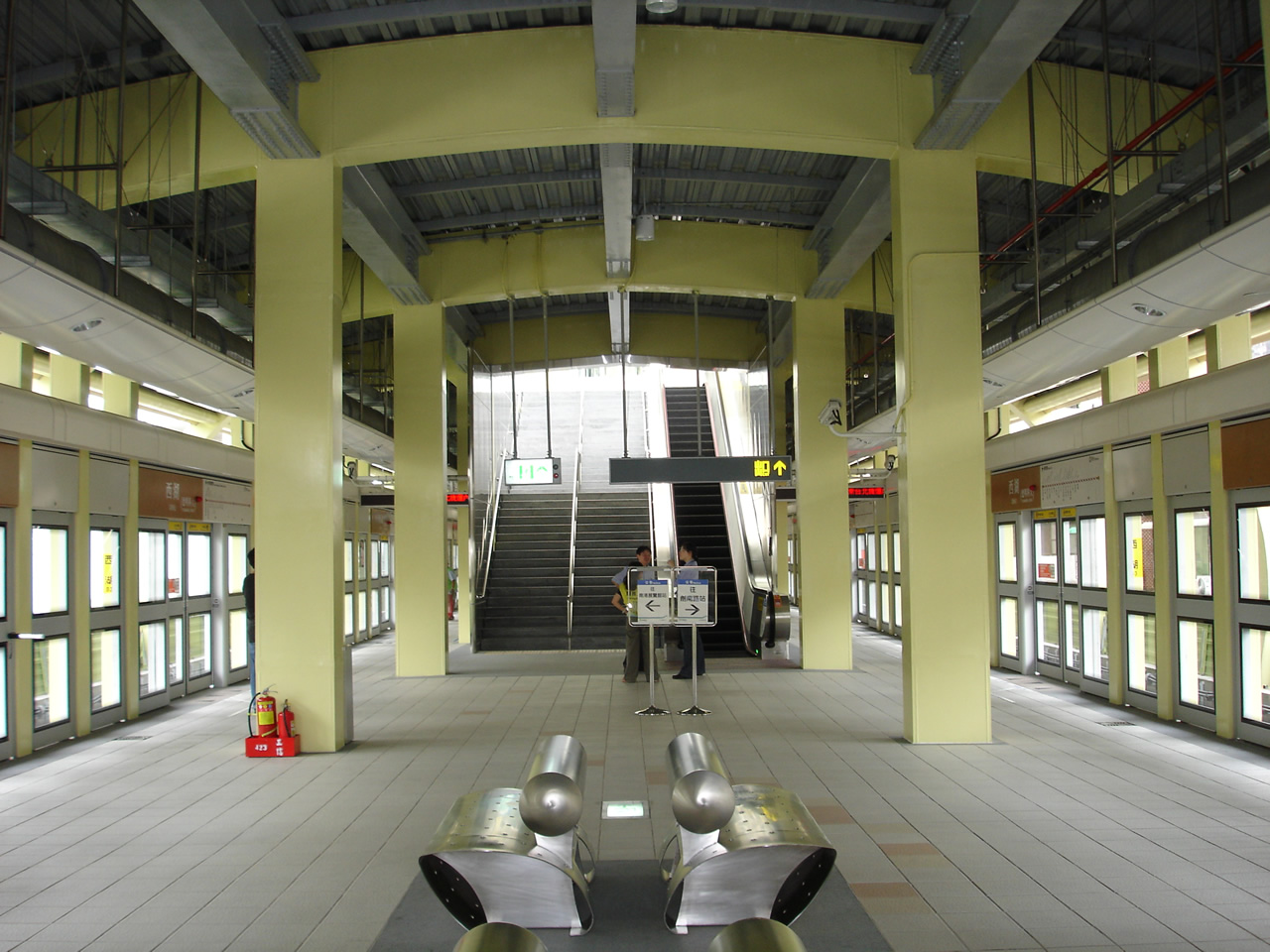
Xihu station platform level

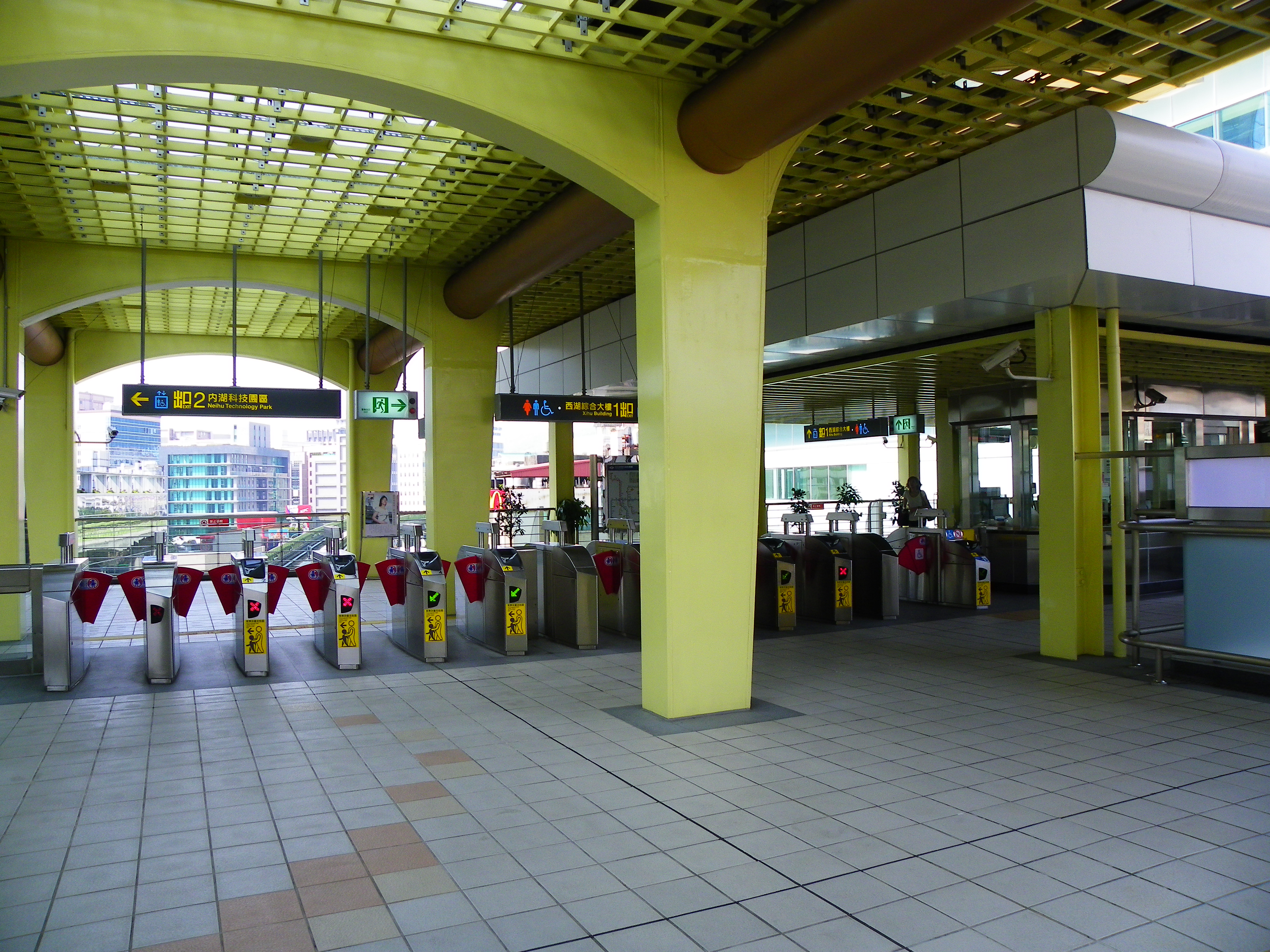
Xihu station concourse

This three-level, elevated station features an island platform, two exits, and a platform elevator located on the east side of the concourse level. Unlike other elevated stations on Brown Line, the concourse of this station is located above the platform level.

On the eastern and northern walls of the station is a public art display. Titled "Crossing-Transformation", the aluminum and pottery brick piece can be perceived differently if viewed from different angles.

Apart from the Taipei Nangang Exhibition Center station, this is the only other elevated station on the Wenhu line that features trains opening its doors on the left rather than on the right.

== History ==
- 22 February 2009: Xihu station construction is completed.
- 4 July 2009: Begins service with the opening of the Brown line.

== Station layout ==
4F	Connecting level	Lobby, information desk, automatic ticket dispensing machines, one-way faregates, restrooms Toward Xihu Market, Xihu Day Care Center for the Elderly; Station maintenance space
3F
3F	Platform 1	← Wenhu line toward Taipei Nangang Exhibition Center (BR17 Gangqian)
3F	Island platform, doors will open on the left
3F	Platform 2	→ Wenhu line toward Taipei Zoo (BR15 Jiannan Road) →

2F	Middle level	Stairs, escalators
1F
1F	Street level	Entrance/exit

B1	Basement	Basement car garage, station machinery

== Nearby Places ==
- Xihu Market
- Neihu Technology Park
- Takming University of Science and Technology
- Xihu Junior High School
- Xihu Elementary School
- Meiti Riverside Park
- BenQ's headquarters
