= Ruihe railway station =

Railway station located in Taitung, Taiwan

Ruihe Station 瑞和車站
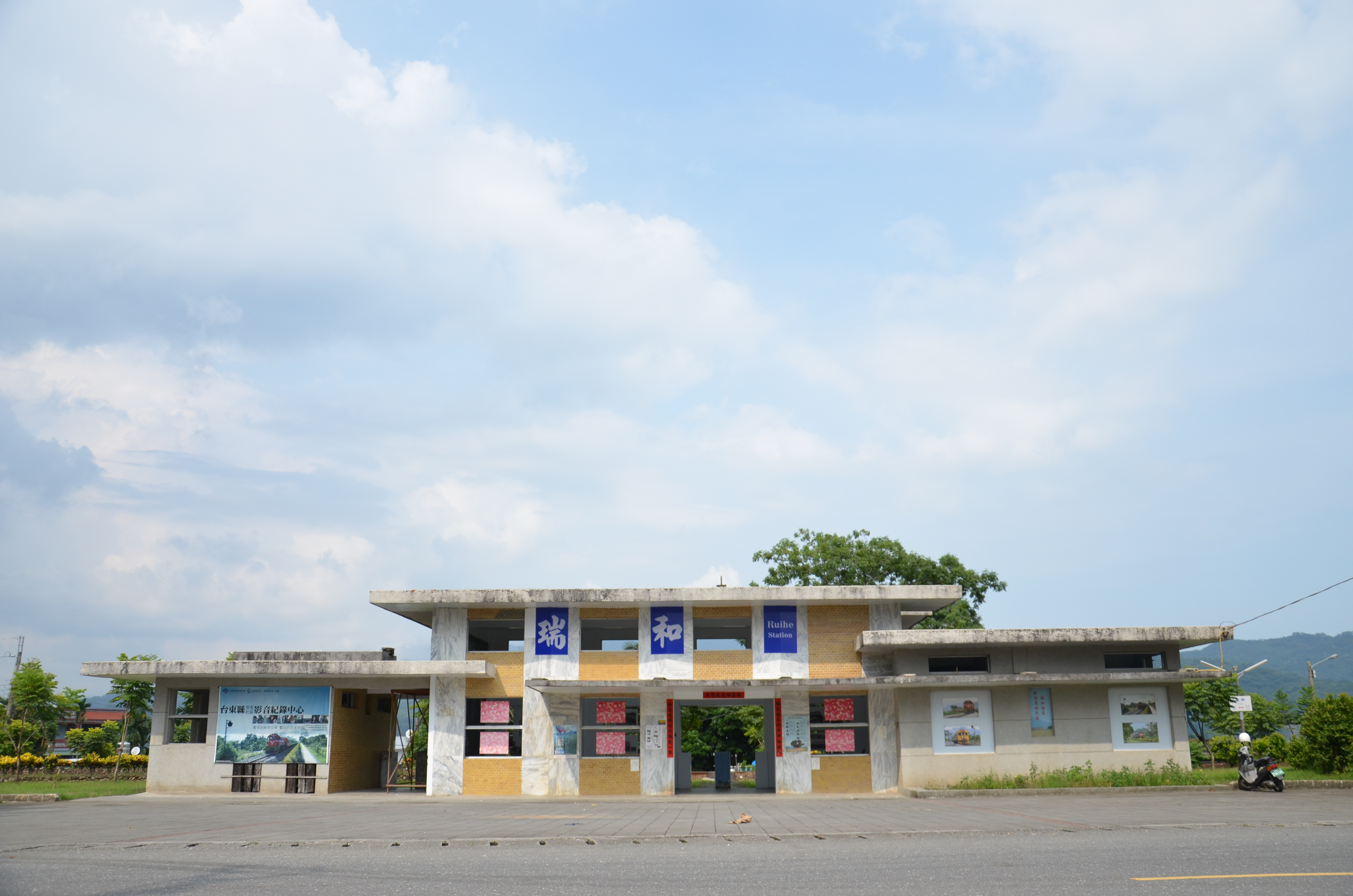
- Station entrance

Chinese name
- Traditional Chinese: 瑞和車站
Transcriptions
Standard Mandarin
- Hanyu Pinyin: Ruìhé Chēzhàn
- Bopomofo: ㄖㄨㄟˋ ㄏㄜˊ ㄔㄜ ㄓㄢˋ

General information
- Location: 955-43 Taitung County Luye Township No. 1-1, Sec. 3, Ruijing Rd. Luye, Taitung; Taiwan
- Coordinates: 22°58′47.8″N 121°09′20.8″E
- System: Taiwan Railway railway station
- Line: Taitung line
- Distance: 128.3 km to Hualien
- Platforms: 1 island platform

Construction
- Structure type: At-grade

Other information
- Station code: 010

History
- Opened: 14 July 1923

Passengers
- 2017: 3,872 per year
- Rank: 219

Services
Preceding station	Taiwan Railway	Following station
Guanshan towards Badu	Eastern Trunk line	Ruiyuan towards Taitung
Location

Ruihe railway station (Chinese: 瑞和車站; pinyin: Ruìhé Chēzhàn) is a railway station located in Luye Township, Taitung County, Taiwan. It is located on the Taitung line and is operated by Taiwan Railway. The station is unstaffed.
