= Donna Chiu =

Taiwanese singer and television host

- Born: Chiou Su-Feng (裘素鳳); 19 January 1965 (age 61); Guanshan, Taitung, Taiwan
- Occupations: Singer, host
- Years active: 1986–present
- Awards: Golden Bell Awards; Best Television Host/Variety Show; 2003
- Musical career
- Also known as: Solar Girl (陽光少女)
- Origin: Taiwan
- Genres: Mandopop
- Instrument: Singing
- Spinoff of: Feiying Trio

Donna Chiu (Chinese: 裘海正; pinyin: Qiú Hǎizhèng; born 19 January 1965) is a Taiwanese singer and former television host. She has won the Golden Bell Award as a host in 2003. She has released a number of albums and has also appeared in films. She is currently engaged in Christian evangelical work.

== Discography ==
=== Studio albums ===
- January 1987: 其實你不懂我的心; Actually You Don't Understand My Heart
- February 1988: 跟夏天說再見; Goodbye Summer's Day
- January 1989: 裘海正的戀愛哲學; Donna Chiu's Philosophy of Love
- May 1992: 紐約之戀－坦白; Longing in New York: Confession
- December 1992: 新白娘子傳奇; Legendary of New White Lady
- June 1993: 放下感情－你說你比較習慣一個人; Let Go of the Feelings – You Said You're More Used to the Person
- March 1994: 愛我的人和我愛的人; The One Who Loves Me and the One I Love
- April 1994: 海愛人抒情歌; Song of Sea Lovers
- December 1994: 愛你十分淚七分 Love You 10 Minutes, 7 Minutes of Tears
- September 1995: 放棄也會有快樂-懂愛的人; There may be Happiness in Giving Up: The One Who Understands Love
- November 1996: Butterfly
- July 1997: 看不見的温柔; Invisible Tenderness
- April 1998: 缺氧; Lacking Oxygen
- November 2012: 瓶中淚; Teardrops in the Bottle
- March 2016: 非我勇敢; I am Not Brave
- February 2021: 從未放棄; Never Give Up

=== Compilation albums ===
- December 1994: 黃金版－鑽石精選集; One Diamond Collection – Gold Edition
- September 1996: 全盛時期; Heyday
- May 2000: 流金十載－全紀錄; Popular Gold Ten Set of All Record Collection
- May 2009: 最富磁性女歌手; Most Magnetic Female Singer

=== EPs ===
- April 2007: 虧欠一生; Owe Life
- July 2010: 愛清倉; Love of Clearance
