= NIH (disambiguation) =

NIH is the National Institutes of Health of the United States.

NIH may also refer to:

== Organisations ==
- National Institute of Health (Italy)
- National Institute of Health (Pakistan)
- National Institute of Homoeopathy, India
- National Institute of Hydrology, an Indian government body
- North Irish Horse, yeomanry unit of the British Territorial Army
- Norwegian School of Sport Sciences (Norwegian: Norges idrettshøgskole), a university in Oslo, Norway

== Other uses ==
- Not invented here, whereby something from another organization or culture is deemed inferior to something from one's own organization or culture
- Nih (town), an ancient town in Sistan (modern Iran and Afghanistan)
- NIH shift, a rearrangement of hydrogen in a molecule
- Nickel–hydrogen battery (NiH_{2} or NIH)

== See also ==
- Nickel–metal hydride battery (NiMH or NIMH)
