= Luye =

Rural township in Taitung County, Taiwan

Coordinates: 22°57′09″N 121°09′46″E

Luye Township 鹿野鄉 Shikano
- Rural township
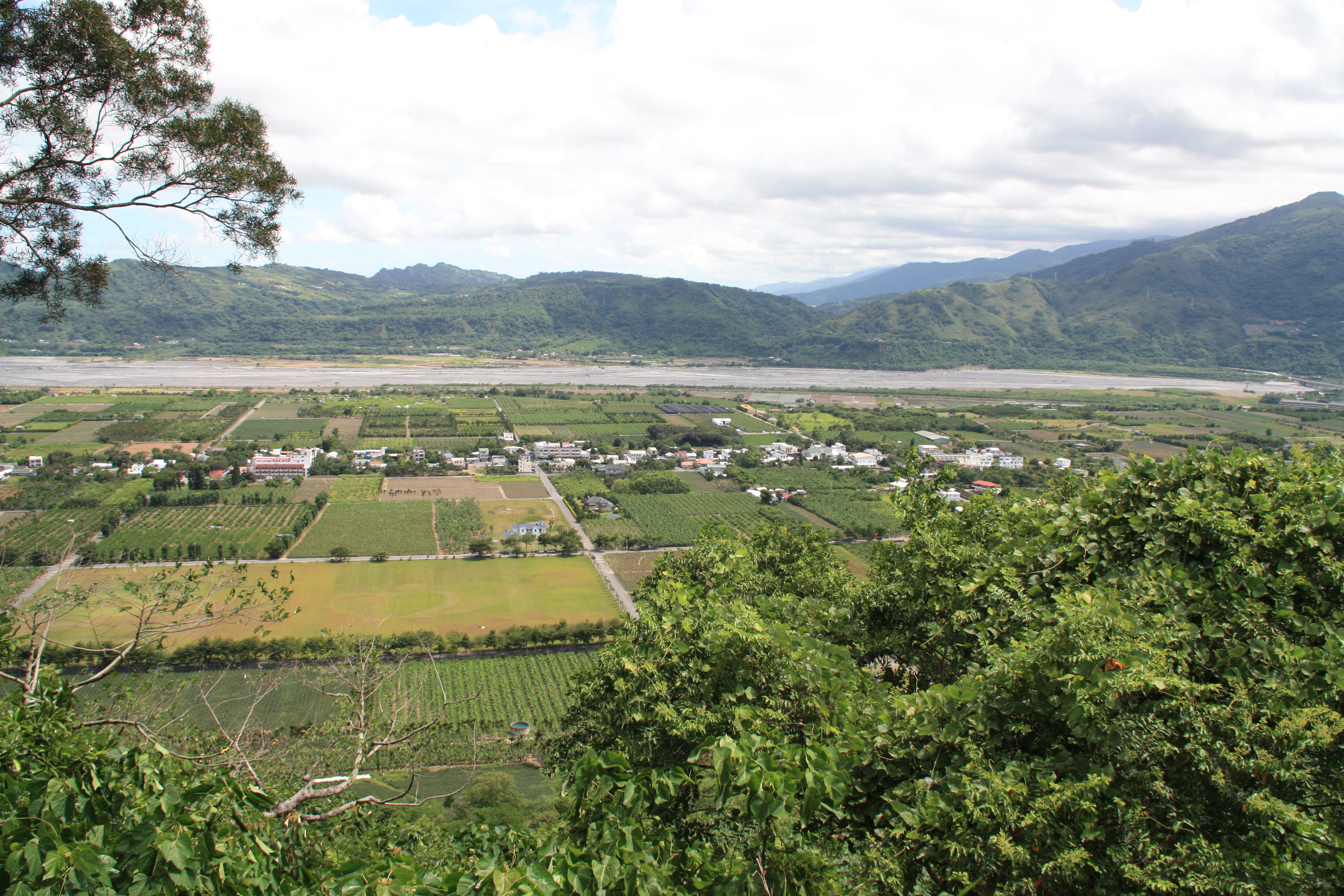

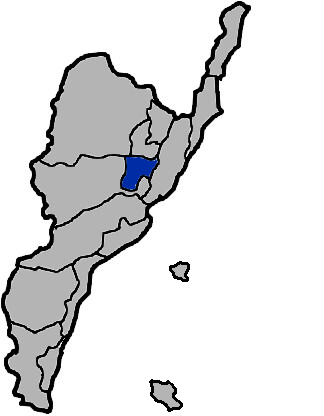
- Luye Township in Taitung County
- Location: Taitung County, Taiwan

Area
  - Total: 90 km^{2} (35 sq mi)

Population (February 2023)
  - Total: 7,275
  - Density: 81/km^{2} (210/sq mi)
- Website: www.lyee.gov.tw (in Chinese)

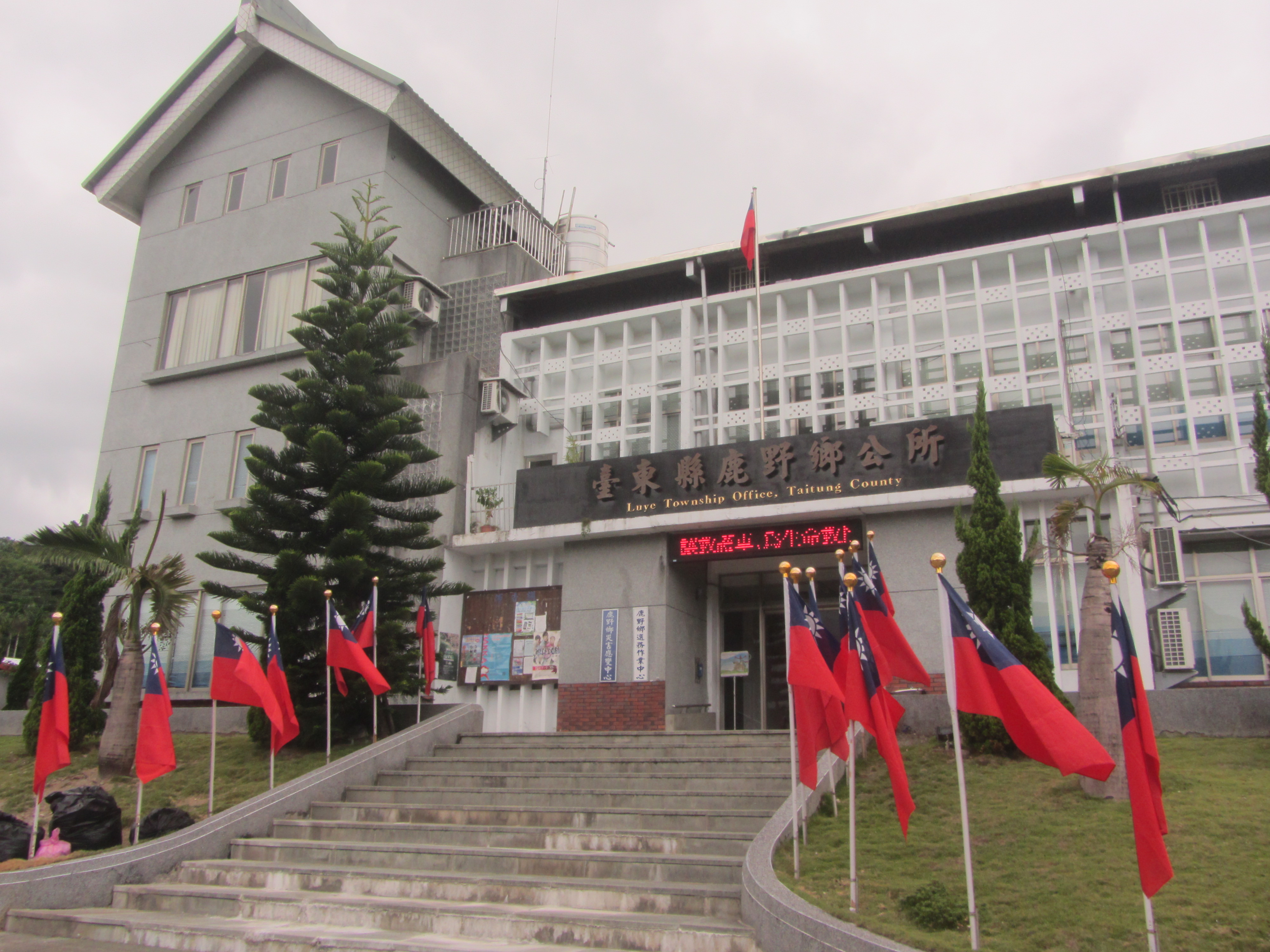
Luye Township Office

Luye Township (Chinese: 鹿野鄉; pinyin: Lùyě Xiāng; Wade–Giles: Lu^{4}-yeh^{3} Hsiang^{1}) is a rural township in Taitung County, Taiwan. It is located in the Huadong Valley.

== Geography ==
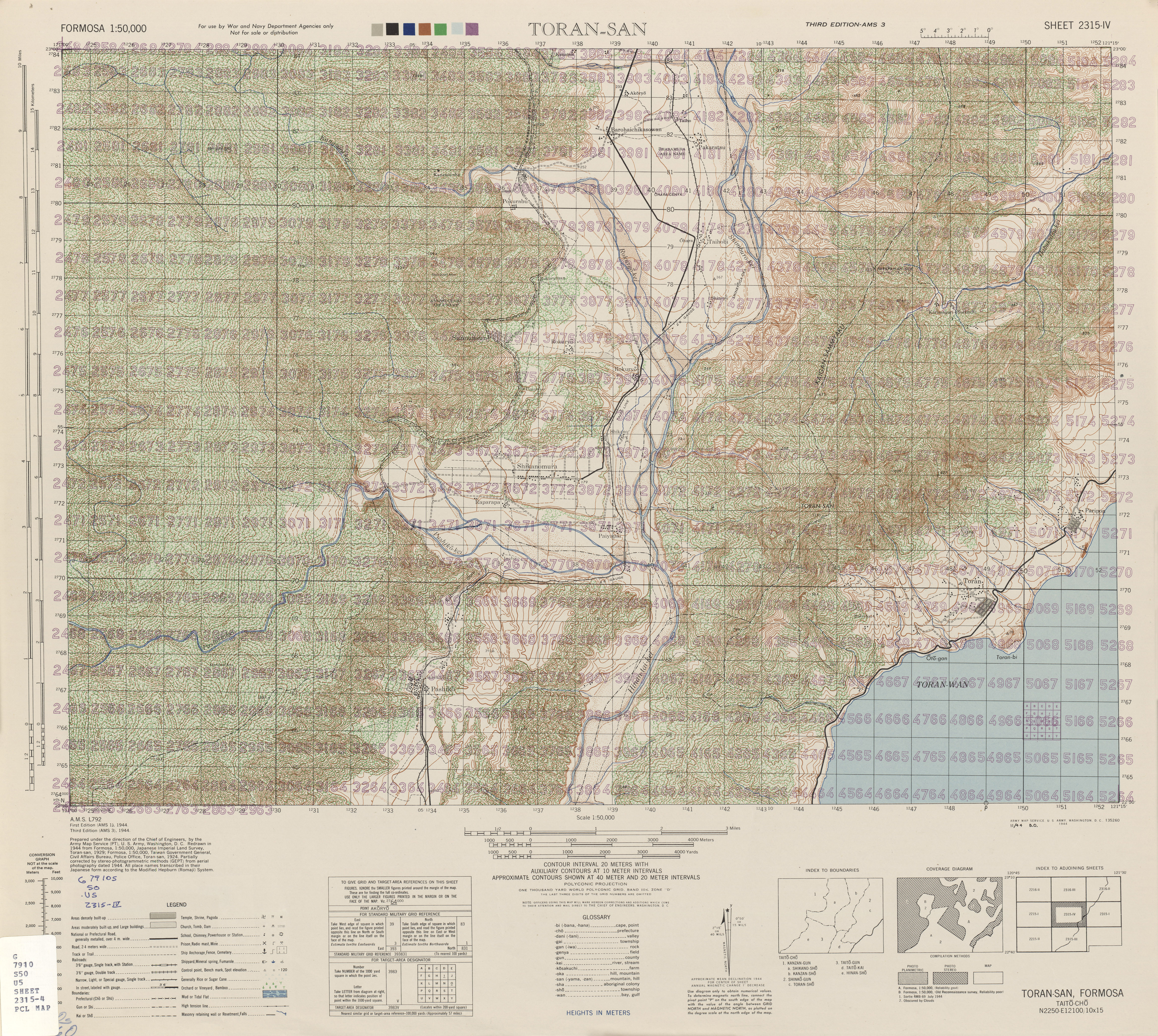
Map including Luye area (1944)

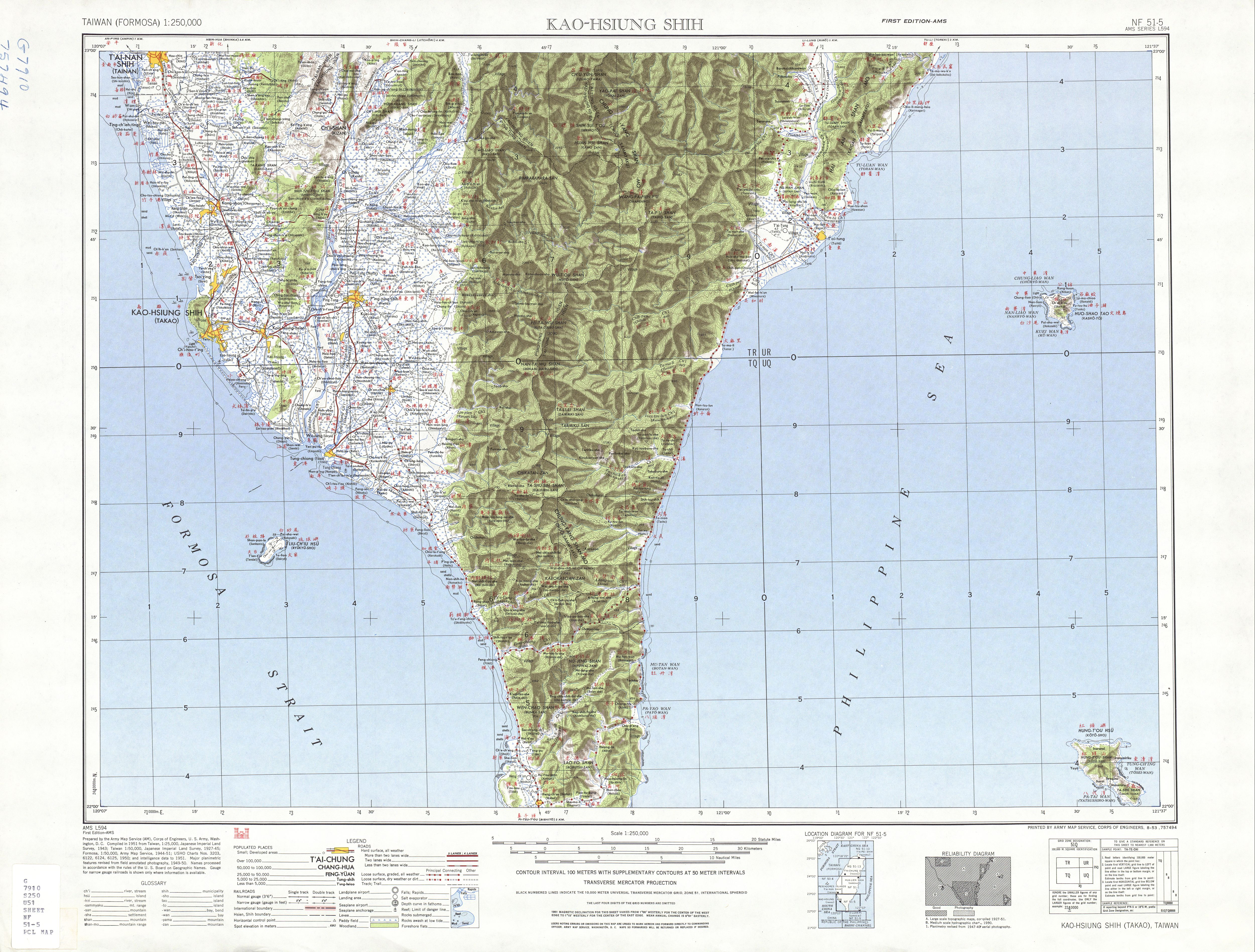
Map of the region including Luye area (1951)

The township is located at the Huadong Valley.

== Administrative divisions ==
- Luye Village
- Longtian Village
- Yong'an Village
- Ruilong Village
- Ruiyuan Village
- Ruihe Village
- Ruifeng Village

== Economy ==
The government has been trying to develop the township into a major tea production area in the east coast of Taiwan.

== Tourist attractions ==
- Kunci Temple
- Luye Highlands
- Finland Stock House of Yung-an
- Flight Ground on Luye Stage
- Liyuan Farm
- Longtien Village
- Luye Stage Tourist Tea Garden
- Luye Steam Nourishing Health Hot Spring
- Shinliang's Water Park
- Thunder Fire Mud Volcano
- Two Level Ground's Moon World
- Wuling Green Tunnel

== Transportation ==
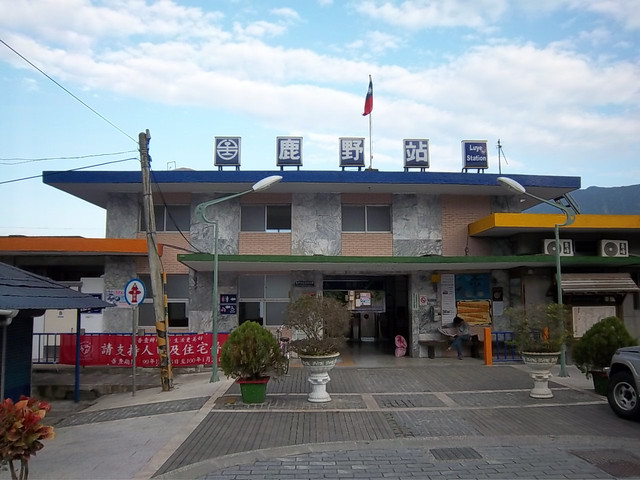
Luye Station

- Provincial Highway 9
- Luye Station, Ruihe Station and Ruiyuan Station of TRA Taitung Line
