= Guanshan railway station =

Railway station located in Taitung, Taiwan

Guanshan Station 關山車站
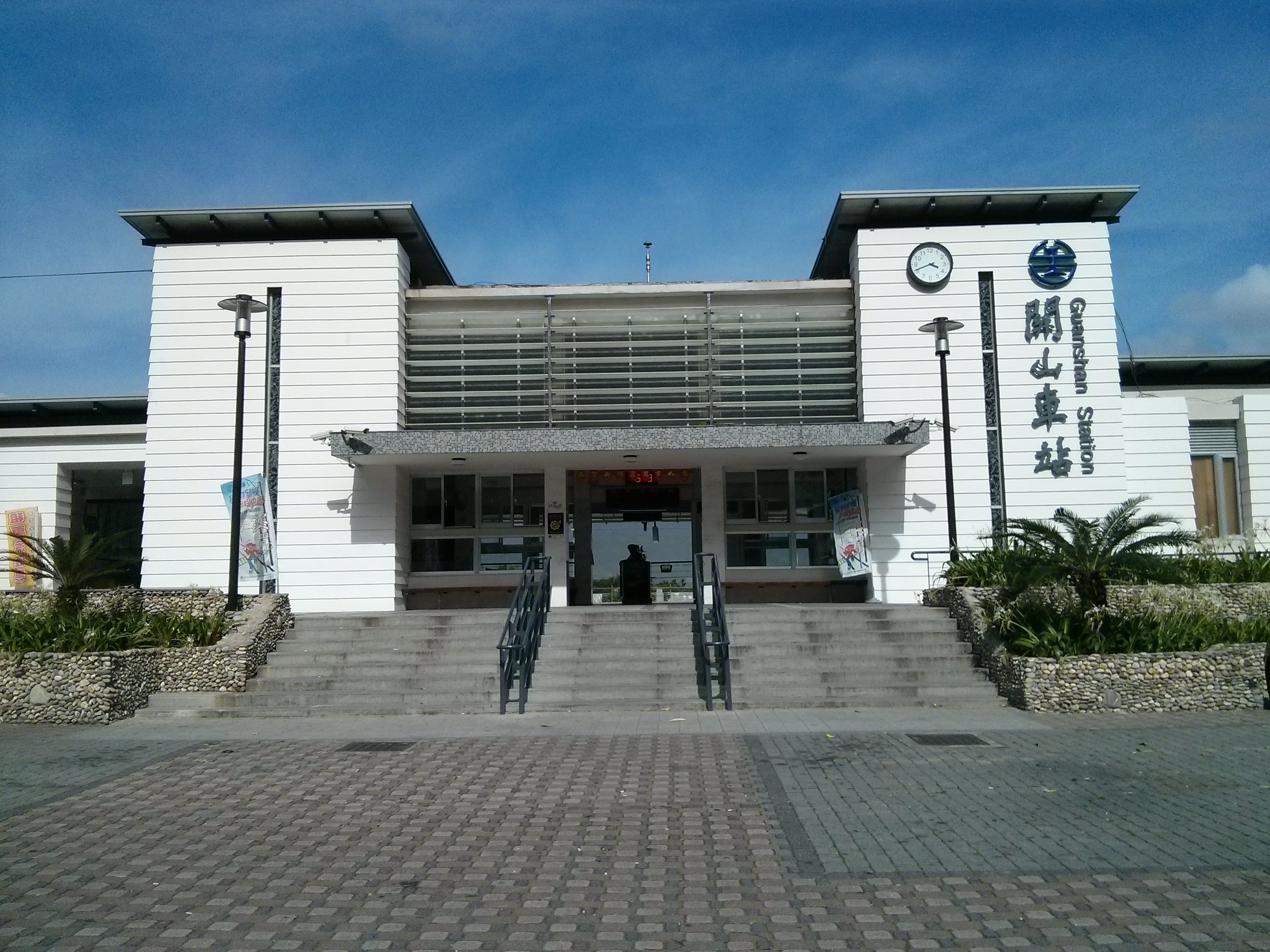

Chinese name
- Traditional Chinese: 關山車站
Transcriptions
Standard Mandarin
- Hanyu Pinyin: Guānshān Chēzhàn
- Bopomofo: ㄍㄨㄢ ㄕㄢ ㄔㄜ ㄓㄢˋ

General information
- Location: Guanshan, Taitung; Taiwan
- Coordinates: 23°02′44.4″N 121°09′51.9″E
- System: Taiwan Railway railway station
- Line: Taitung line
- Distance: 120.9 km to Hualien
- Platforms: 1 island platform

Construction
- Structure type: At-grade

Other information
- Station code: 012

History
- Opened: 20 April 1922

Passengers
- 2017: 224,108 per year
- Rank: 123

Services
| Preceding station | Taiwan Railway | Following station |
|---|---|---|
| Haiduan towards Badu | Eastern Trunk line | Ruihe towards Taitung |
Location

Guanshan railway station (Chinese: 關山車站; pinyin: Guānshān Chēzhàn) is a railway station located in Guanshan Township, Taitung County, Taiwan. It is located on the Taitung line and is operated by Taiwan Railway.

== Around the station ==
- Guanshan Waterfront Park
