= Haiduan railway station =

Railway station located in Taitung, Taiwan

Haiduan Station 海端車站
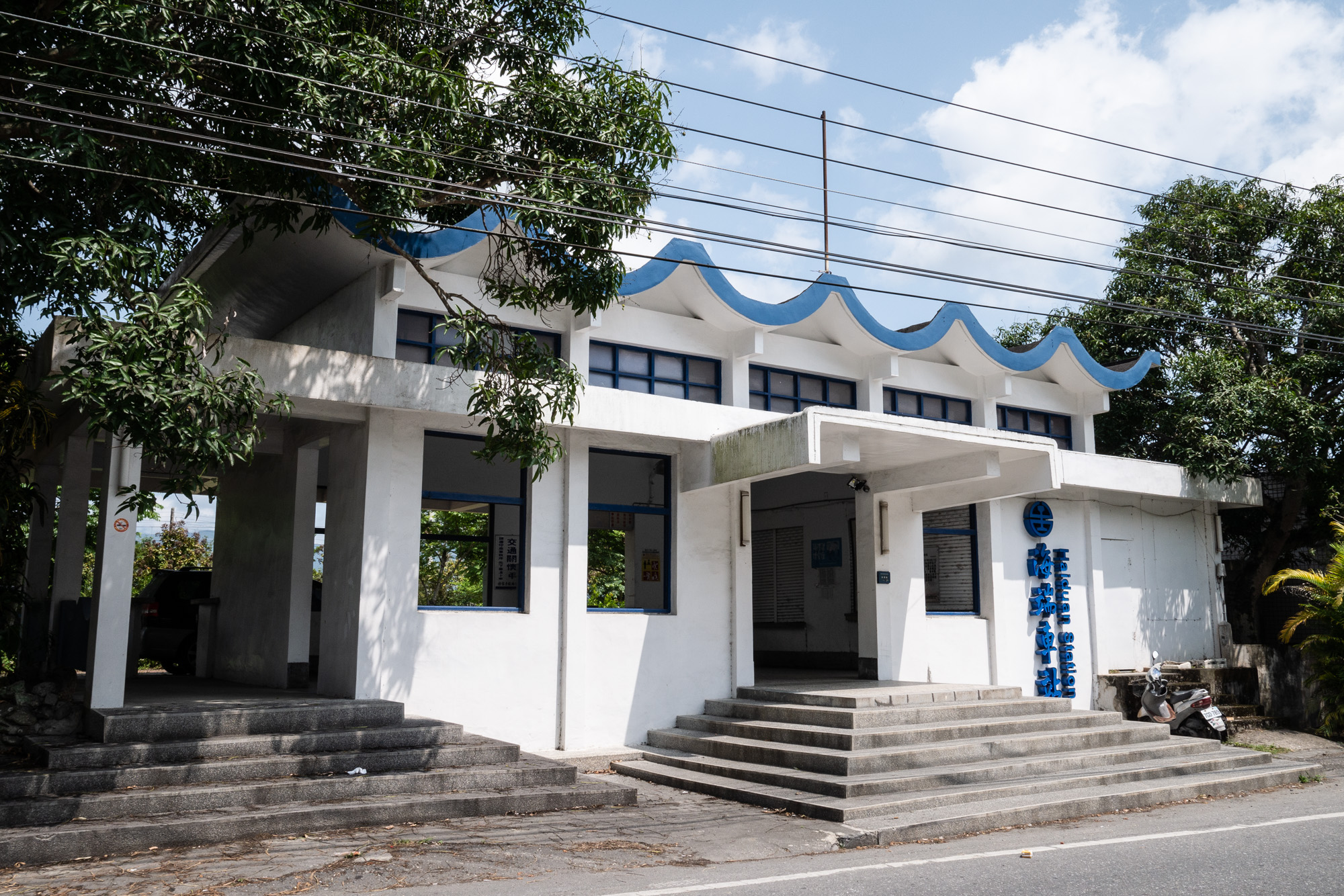

Chinese name
- Traditional Chinese: 海端車站
Transcriptions
Standard Mandarin
- Hanyu Pinyin: Hǎiduān Chēzhàn
- Bopomofo: ㄏㄞˇ ㄉㄨㄢ ㄔㄜ ㄓㄢˋ

General information
- Location: Guanshan, Taitung; Taiwan
- Coordinates: 23°06′10.6″N 121°10′36.0″E
- System: Taiwan Railway railway station
- Line: Taitung line
- Distance: 114.4 km to Hualien
- Platforms: 1 side platform

Construction
- Structure type: At-grade

Other information
- Station code: 014

History
- Opened: 27 August 1924

Passengers
- 2017: 1,920 per year
- Rank: 225

Services
Preceding station	Taiwan Railway	Following station
Chishang towards Badu	Eastern Trunk line	Guanshan towards Taitung
Location

Haiduan railway station (Chinese: 海端車站; pinyin: Hǎiduān Chēzhàn) is a railway station located in Guanshan Township, Taitung County, Taiwan. It is located on the Taitung line and is operated by Taiwan Railway. It is named after nearby Haiduan Township.

== Around the station ==
- Bunun Cultural Museum
