= Lo Hsien-che =

ROC general and PRC spy

Major general Lo Hsien-che
- 羅賢哲
- Born: 1959 (age 66–67); Guanshan, Taitung, Taiwan
- Known for: spying for the People's Republic of China
- Criminal penalty: life imprisonment

Major general Lo Hsieh-che (Chinese: 羅賢哲; pinyin: Luó Xiánzhé) was the head of the electronic communications and information department in the Republic of China Army until his arrest in early 2011 on charges of spying for the People's Republic of China. Lo is reported to be the highest-ranking officer arrested for allegedly spying for China, and thus represents Taiwan's worst espionage case in 50 years. Taiwan military court sentenced Lo to life imprisonment on 26 April 2012.

== Biography ==
Lo was born in 1959 into a military family. His father is a Chinese veteran and his mother is from Penghu, Taiwan. His parents met and got married when his father was stationed in Penghu. Lo has an elder brother who is also in the military. Lo's father retired from the army, where he was a platoon leader, and took up farming in Guanshan, Taitung.

Lo's elder brother attended the Chung Cheng Armed Forces Preparatory School, after which he attended the Republic of China Military Academy. He achieved the rank of Colonel, and has since retired.

Following in his brother's footsteps, he entered the ROC Military Academy, where he graduated from the 51st Communications section. Being proficient in languages, he also studied in the United States Defense Language Institute in Monterey, California. He graduated from Colleges of Army and Warfare of the National Defense University. In 2000, he became Commander of the 73rd Communications unit of the 6th Army Corps, and was promoted to Colonel.

=== Military career ===
- Military attache in Thailand 2002–2005.
- Returned to Taiwan in 2006 as deputy director of international intelligence affairs.
- became head of the electronic communications and information department in the ROC Army.
- Promoted to Major general on 1 January 2008

== Spying allegations and motivations ==
Military officials said Lo's office and house were raided by security authorities on 27 January 2011. Classified documents about current military electronic warfare and strategies were found.

China Times reported that he had been lured by sex and money; news reports dubbed the case as "honey trap". Lo is said to have met a woman in her thirties and got involved with her when he was stationed in Thailand between 2002 and 2005, and had been selling high-level secrets since 2004. The woman, said to hold an Australian passport and described as "tall, beautiful and chic," induced Lo to collect secrets for her. He reportedly received payment on a case by case basis. According to local media cited by the South China Morning Post, Lo may have received US$1 million on occasions. However, United Daily News said: "sexual and financial temptations aside, the choice was definitely related to Lo's confusion over the country's future and the loyalty of military servicemen."

China Post cites media reports that the American Institute in Taiwan (AIT), the de facto US mission in Taiwan, had been aware of the affair Lo was having in 2002 and had conducted their own investigation into it between 2002 and 2005. Although Lo was already married, he conducted his affair with the woman even after he returned to Taiwan. The media reported that his trips to the US with her had been monitored by US intelligence, who alerted Taipei to the liaison.

=== Implications ===
Although Lo is said to be the highest-ranking officer arrested for allegedly spying for the PRC, the Taiwanese Ministry of National Defense downplayed the threat posed by the possible leaks by Lo, stating that he only had limited access to highly classified information. The acting director of the MND political warfare bureau said that Lo's duties as Director of the army's information and communications bureau were mainly "management duties". However, some military experts believe that Lo had access to an information about vital air, ground and sea battle management systems which could have severely compromised Taiwan's military command system in the case of conflict with Mainland China. Experts also believe joint military cooperation between Taipei and Washington may also have been jeopardized by the security breach.

There are particular concerns that Lo may have passed on classified information on the "Po Sheng Operation", an advanced island-wide electronic warfare communications network used for directing the army, navy and air force in joint Taiwan–US war operations and communicating with the US Pacific Command. Military officials noted the Po Sheng system was so sensitive that different sections were constructed by different contractors to avoid the entire system being exposed. However, spokesman for the Taiwanese military said that the head of the army's communications and electronic information bureau did not have access to overall details of the Po Sheng project.
