= Guanshan, Taitung =

Urban township in Taitung County, Taiwan

Coordinates: 23°01′05″N 121°11′38″E

Guanshan Township 關山鎮 Kanzan
- Urban township
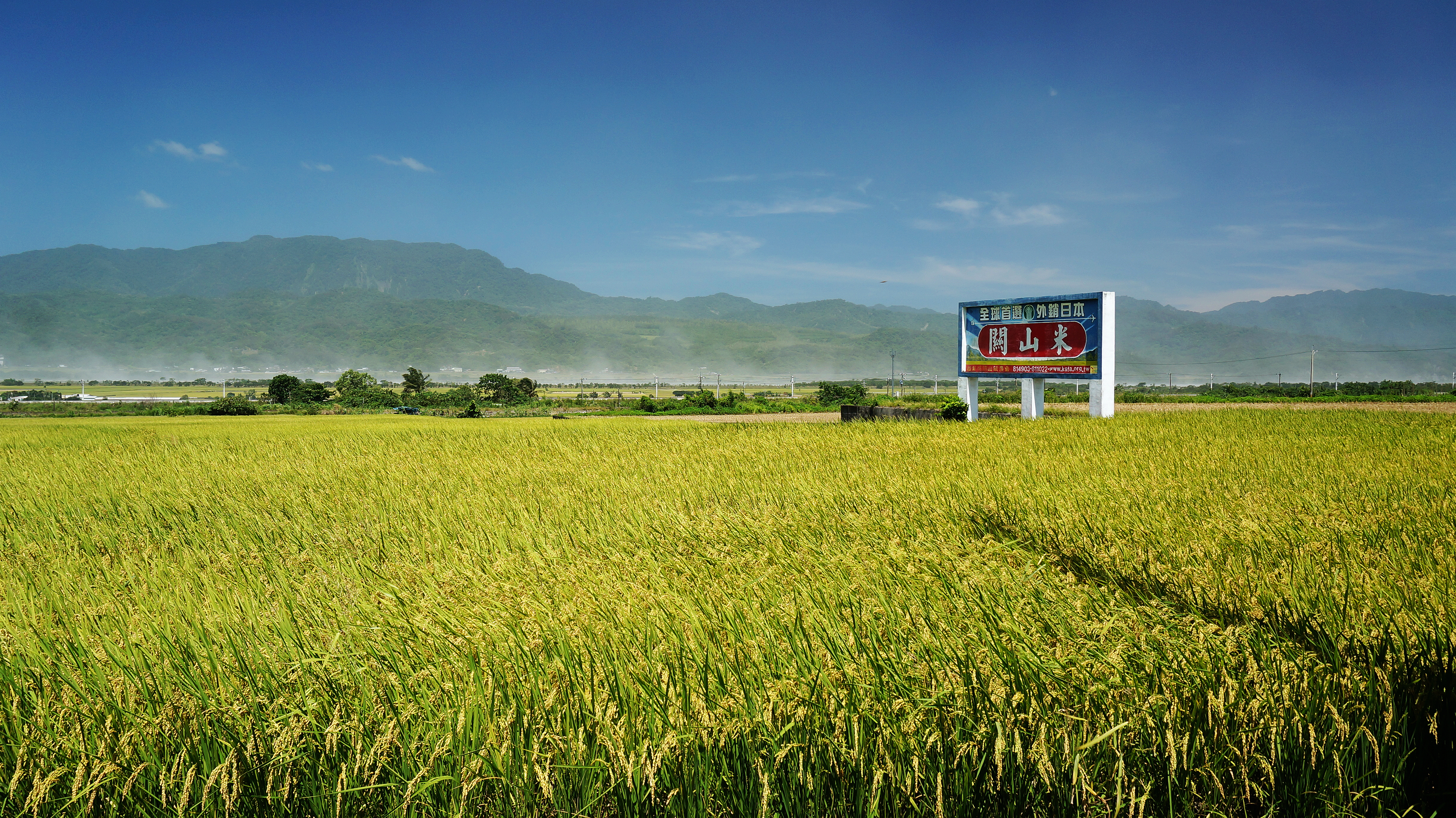

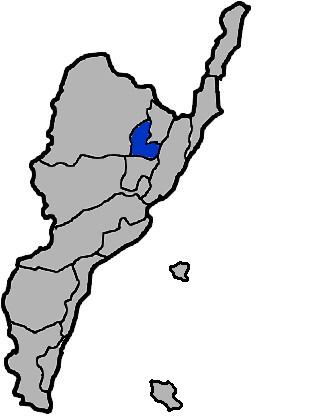
- Guanshan Township in Taitung County
- Location: Taitung County, Taiwan

Area
  - Total: 59 km^{2} (23 sq mi)

Population (February 2023)
  - Total: 8,160
  - Density: 140/km^{2} (360/sq mi)

Guanshan Township (Chinese: 關山鎮; pinyin: Guānshān Zhèn; Wade–Giles: Kuan^{1}-shan^{1} Chen^{4}) is an urban township in northern Taitung County, Taiwan.

== History ==
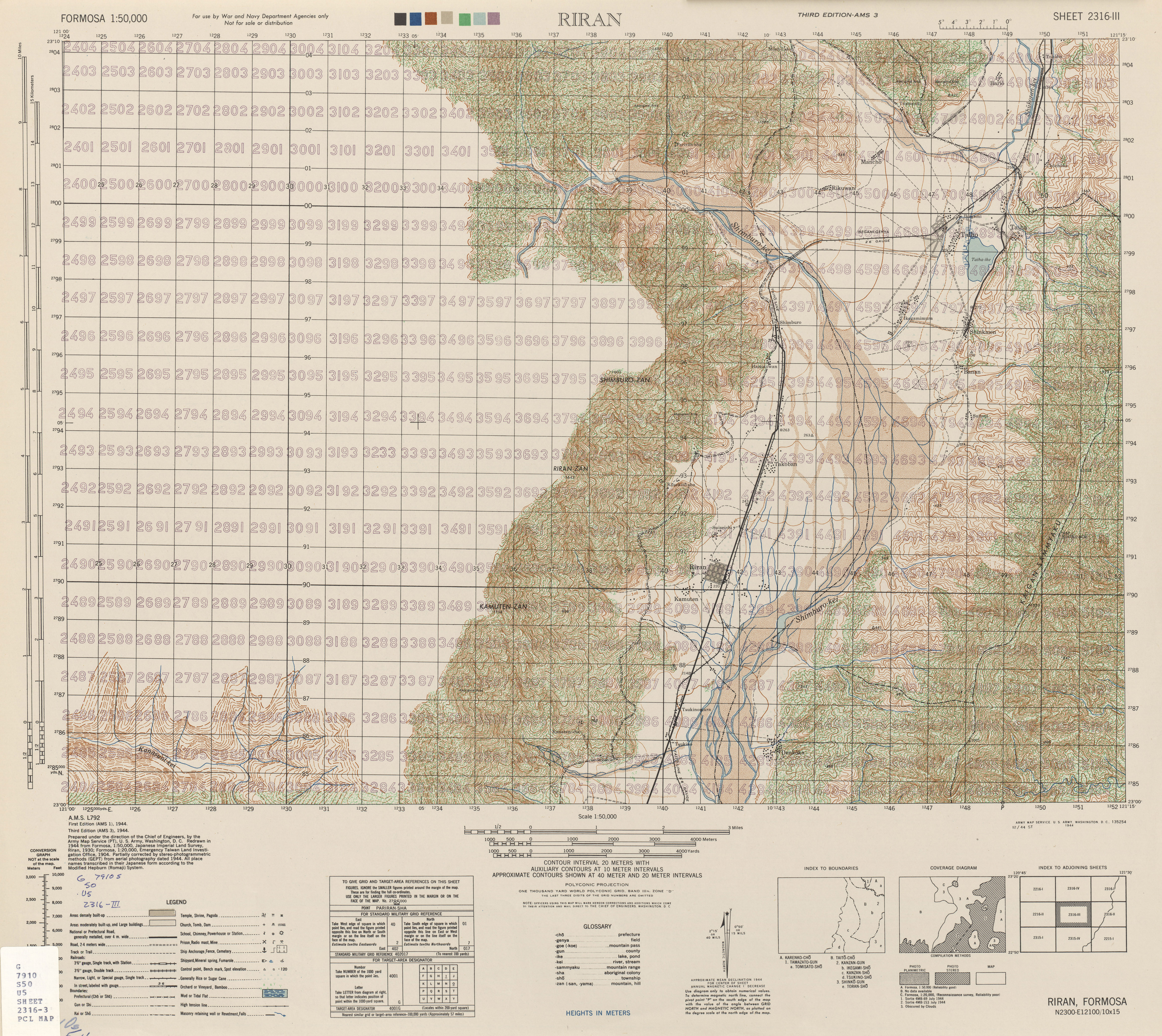
Map including Guanshan area (1944)

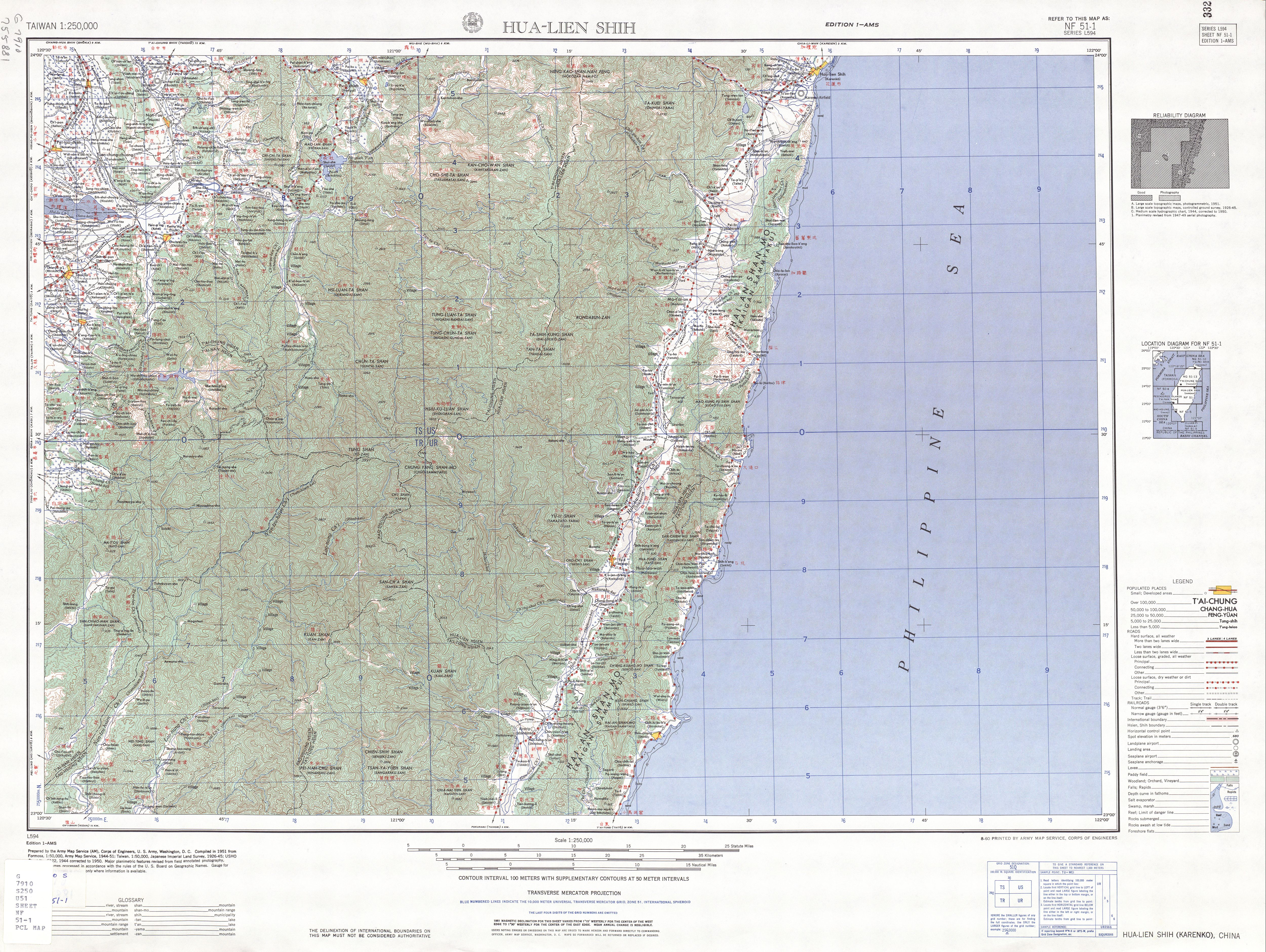
Map including Guanshan area (1951)

Formerly called Lilong, which is from the Amis word meaning "red worms" and rendered in Hokkien as A-lí-lóng (阿里壟). By 1920, the town was called Kanzan Town under Kanzan District, Taitō Prefecture.

== Geography ==
It is located in the Huatung Valley South segment. Beinan River flows through. In the east it is bordered by the Hai'an Range and in the west by the Central Mountain Range. Guanshan has a Tropical Monsoon Climate. Annual rainfall is 2,000 mm with an average temperature of 23.7 degrees Celsius.

Covering an area of 58.735 km^{2}, Guanshan has a population of 8,160 people (as of February 2023).

== Administrative divisions ==
Guanshan Township consists of 7 villages, namely Chungfu, Fengchuan, Hsinfu, Lilong, Tekao, Tienkuan and Yuemei, and 135 neighborhoods.

== Economy ==
Rice is the most important crop in the township due to its relatively flat terrain suitable for paddy field.

== Tourist attractions ==
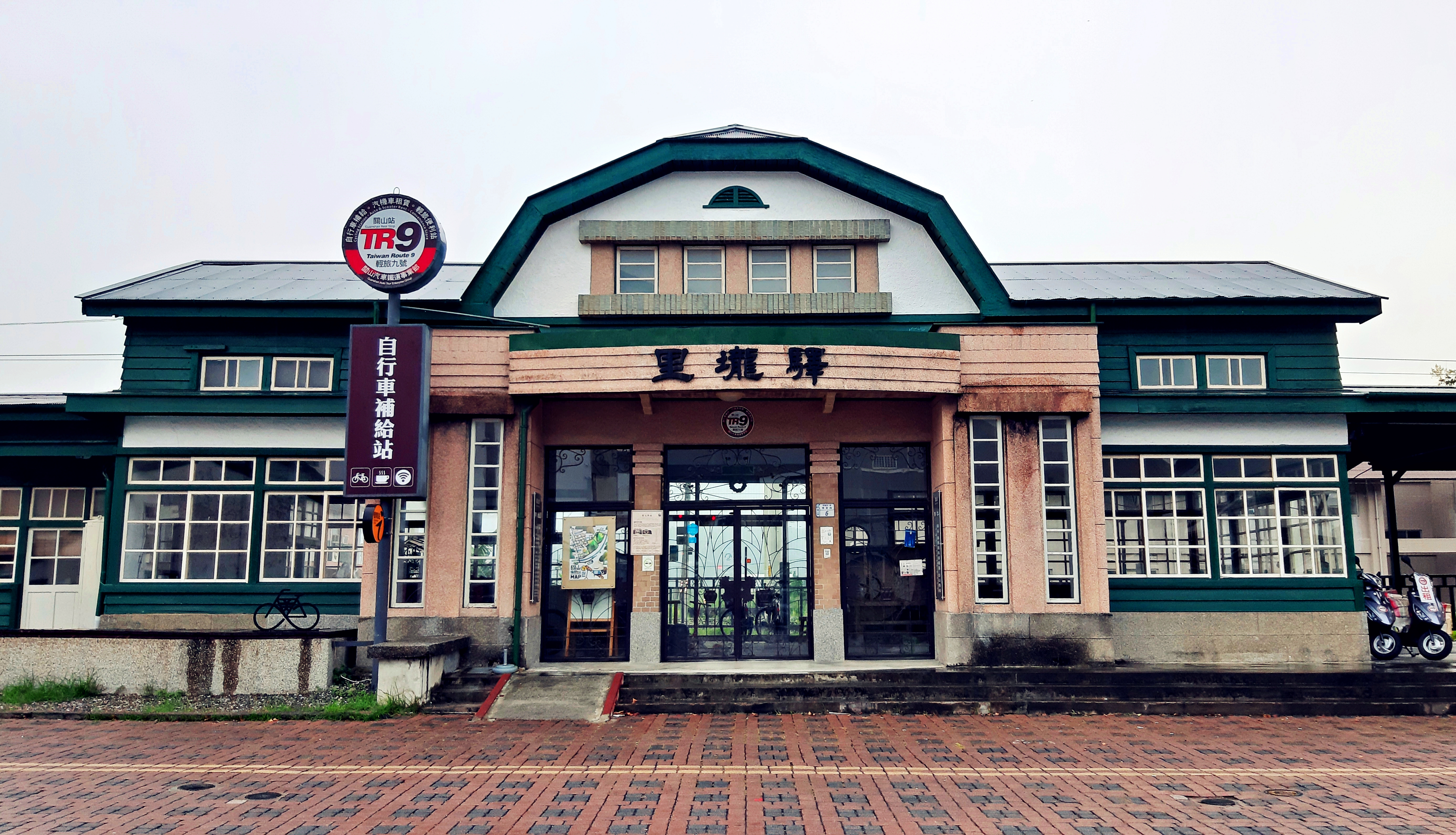
Old Guanshan Rail Station

- Guanshan Bike Trail
- Guanshan Hongshi Trail
- Guanshan Waterfront Park
- Guanshan Tianho Temple
- Nanshan Temple
- Old Guanshan Rail Station

== Transportation ==
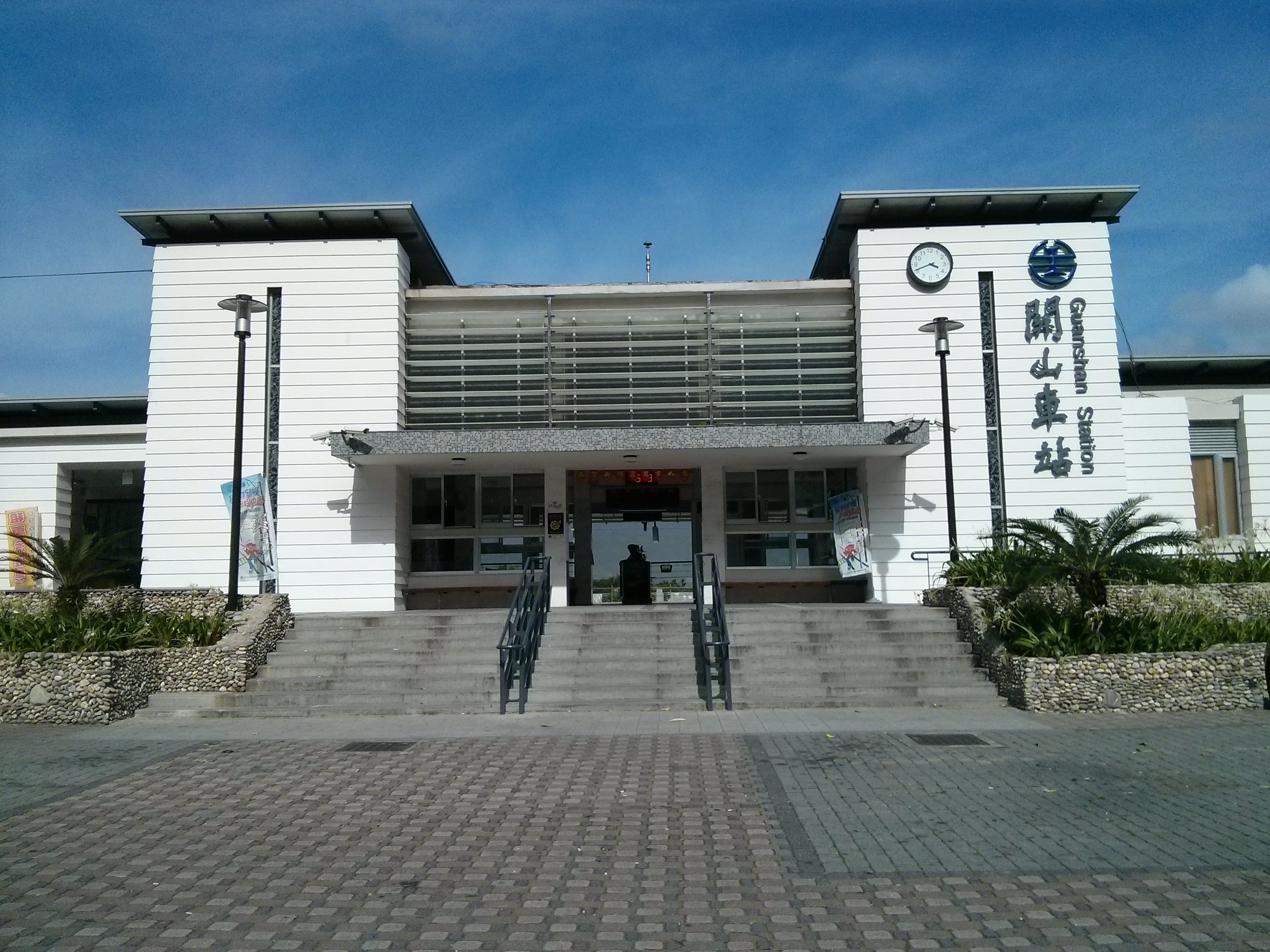
Guanshan Station

Guanshan Township is accessible from Guanshan Station and Haiduan Station of Taiwan Railway.

== Notable natives ==
- Donna Chiu, singer
- Kong Jaw-sheng, Chairperson of Financial Supervisory Commission (2004-2006)
- Lo Hsien-che, spy
- Tseng Li-cheng, taekwondo athlete
