= Luye railway station =

Railway station located in Taitung, Taiwan

Luye Station 鹿野車站
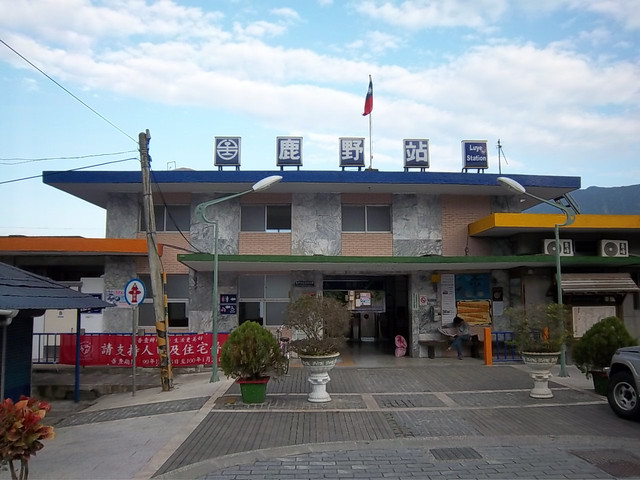

Chinese name
- Traditional Chinese: 鹿野車站
Transcriptions
Standard Mandarin
- Hanyu Pinyin: Lùyé Chēzhàn
- Bopomofo: ㄌㄨˋ ㄧㄝˇ ㄔㄜ ㄓㄢˋ

General information
- Location: Luye, Taitung County; Taiwan
- Coordinates: 22°54′44.9″N 121°08′13.1″E
- System: Taiwan Railway railway station
- Line: Taitung line
- Distance: 136.6 km to Hualien
- Platforms: 1 island platform

Construction
- Structure type: At-grade

Other information
- Station code: 008

History
- Opened: 20 April 1922

Passengers
- 2017: 82,874 per year
- Rank: 154

Services
Preceding station	Taiwan Railway	Following station
Ruiyuan towards Badu	Eastern Trunk line	Shanli towards Taitung
Location

Luye railway station (Chinese: 鹿野車站; pinyin: Lúyě Chēzhàn) is a railway station located in Luye Township, Taitung County, Taiwan. It is located on the Taitung line and is operated by Taiwan Railway.
