= Nih (town) =

Nih was a town belonging to the ancient state of Sistan, which straddles the modern border of Afghanistan and Iran.

In his 1905 book The Lands of the Eastern Caliphate, Guy Le Strange wrote:

At some distance to the west of the Zarah lake, on the Kuhistan frontier and close to the border of the Great Desert, is the town of Nih, or Nîh, which is named by earlier Arab geographers as belonging to Sîstân. Muķaddasî mentions it as a strongly fortified town, the houses of which were built of clay, water being brought down from the hills by underground channels. Nih is also referred to by Yâķût and Mustawfî, who, however, add no details, except to state that it was founded by King Ardashîr Bâbgân, though at the present day the remains of great fortifications, and the immense ruins found here, would seem to prove that in the middle-ages it had been a place of much importance.
