= Taipei Municipal Nei-Hu Vocational High School =

High school in Neihu, Taipei, Taiwan

Coordinates: 25.0792°N 121.5750°E

臺北市立內湖高級工業職業學校
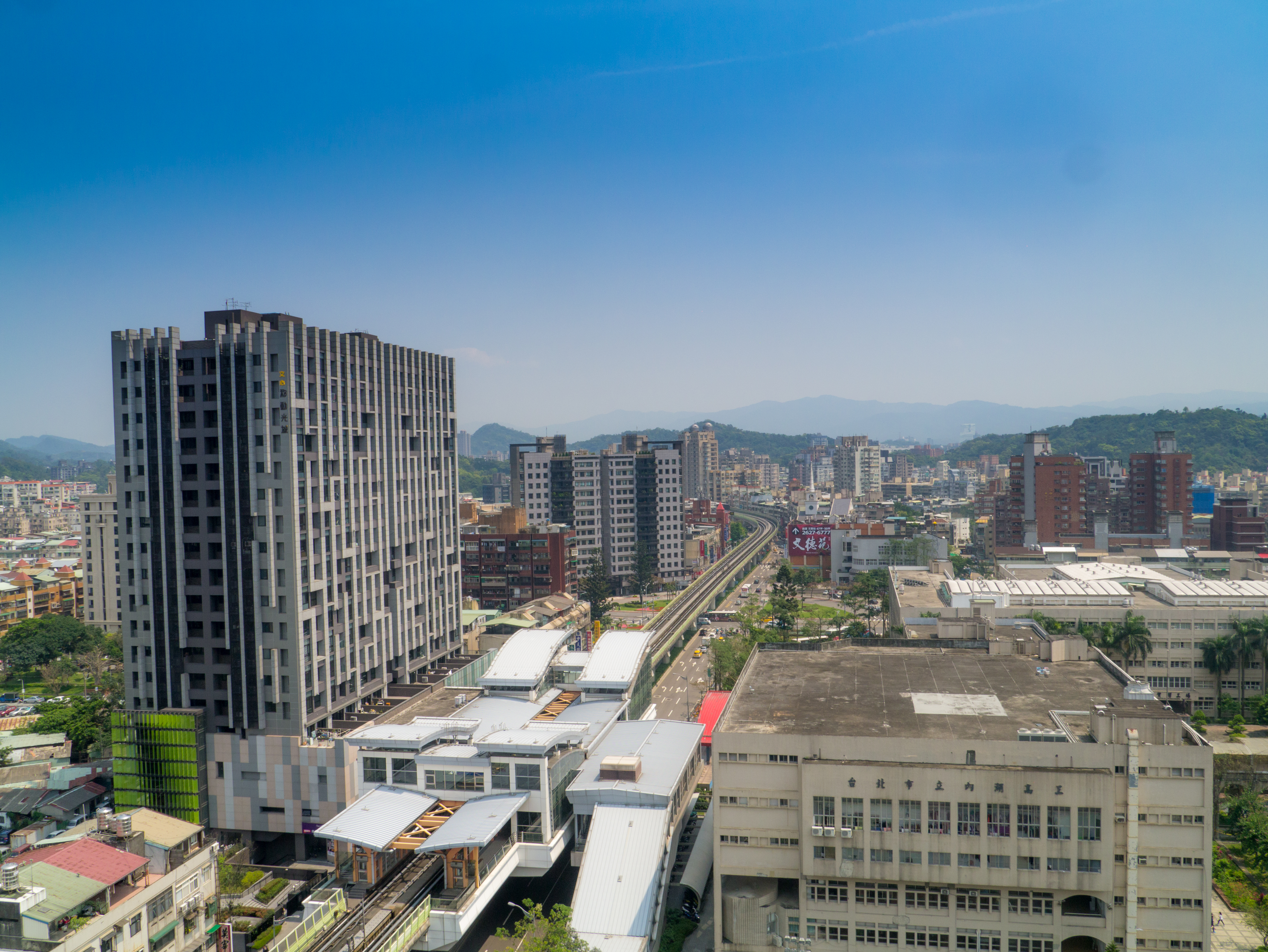

Location
- No. 520, Sec. 1, Neihu Rd, Neihu District, Taipei City, 114, Taiwan (R.O.C.)

Information
- Other name: Taipei Municipal Nei-Hu Vocational High School
- Type: Municipal high school
- Established: 1986
- School district: Neihu, Taipei, Taiwan
- Principal: Po-Hui Shih
- Grades: 60 classes
- Website: NIHS Official

The Taipei Municipal Nei-Hu Vocational High School (Chinese: 臺北市立內湖高級工業職業學校), formerly Taipei Municipal Nei-Hu Industrial High School, abbreviated as NIHS (內湖高工) is a public 3-year high school in Neihu District, Taipei, Taiwan.

== History ==
Taipei Municipal Nei-Hu Industrial High School (NIHS) was founded to support Taipei City’s strategic push toward high-tech, automation-driven industries in the 1980s. Recognizing the urgent need for a skilled industrial workforce, the Taipei City Government initiated the school's development with a focus on training entry-level technical professionals in electrical and electronic engineering.

The preparatory office was established on August 1, 1983, within the campus of Taipei Municipal Daan Vocational High School. Mr. Wu Tsan-Yang was appointed as the director and led the early organizational efforts.

NIHS officially opened its doors in July 1986.

== Departments ==
NIHS initially established five departments: Computer Science (資訊科), Electronics Engineering (電子科), Electrical Engineering (電機科), Control Engineering (控制科), and Refrigeration & Air conditioning (冷凍空調科). It was the first vocational high school in Taiwan to center its curriculum around the electrical and electronic engineering disciplines.

The Department of Store Service (門市服務科) was introduced in 2002, followed by the launch of a dedicated Athletic Training Program (體育專班) in 2007. In August 2013, the school established a Department of Foreign Languages (應用外語科), beginning with a program in English.

The Department of Microcomputer Repair (微電腦修護科) was later added as the school’s newest academic unit.

== Notable people ==
- Benson Chen (陳書賢) - News anchor
- Lin Yun-ju (林昀儒) - Table tennis player
- Stephen Hsu (許志豪) - Singer

== See also ==
- Gangqian Station
