= Guanshan Waterfront Park =

Park in Guangshan, Taitung County, Taiwan

- 關山親水公園
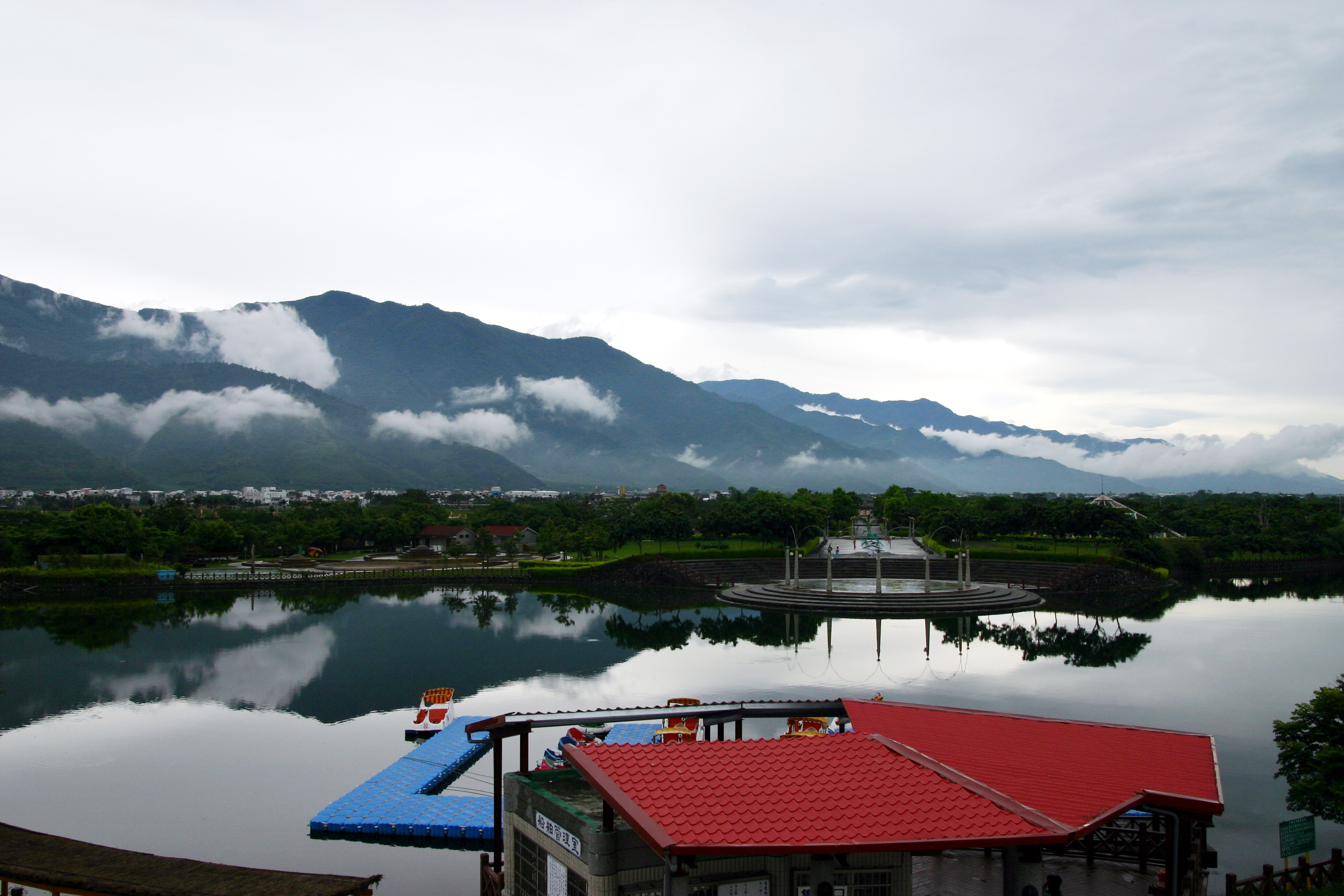
- Interactive map of Guanshan Waterfront Park
- Type: park
- Location: Guanshan, Taitung County, Taiwan
- Coordinates: 23°2′26.1″N 121°10′27.3″E
- Area: 34 hectares (84 acres)
- Opened: 1999
- Public transit: Guanshan Station

The Guanshan Waterfront Park (traditional Chinese: 關山親水公園; simplified Chinese: 关山亲水公园; pinyin: Guānshān Hébīn Gōngyuán) is a park in Guanshan Township, Taitung County, Taiwan.

== History ==
The park was built in 1999 from the previous dumping ground.

== Geology ==
The park spans over an area of 34 hectares. One-third of the park consists of a lake and the remaining two-thirds is the park area. The water for the lake comes from a subterranean river. The park consists of pavilions, nest boxes, ecological island etc.

== Transportation ==
The park is accessible within walking distance southeast of Guanshan Station of Taiwan Railway.

== See also ==
- List of parks in Taiwan
- Guanshan Riverside Park
