= Guanshan Riverside Park =

Park in Songshan, Taipei, Taiwan

- 觀山河濱公園
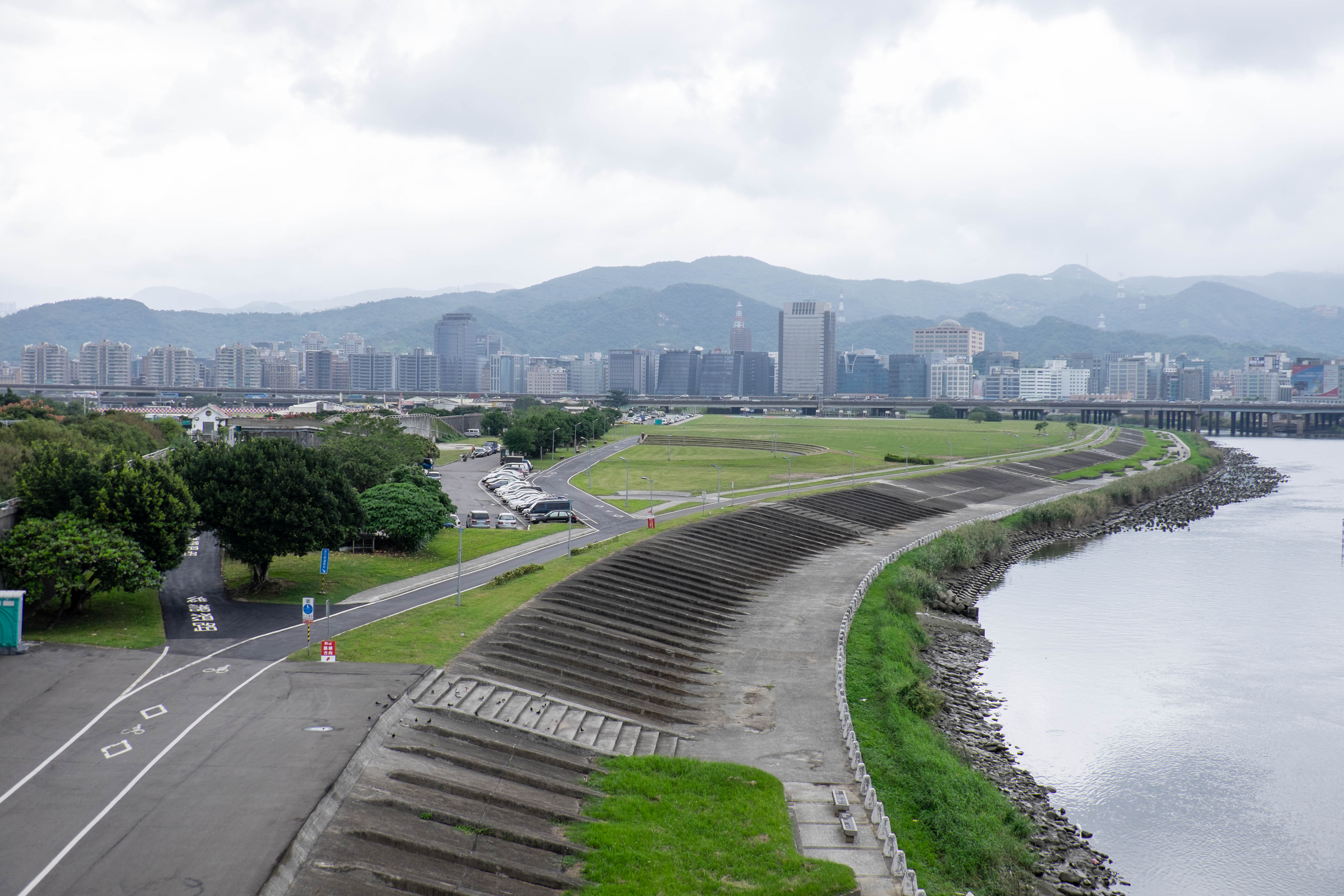
- Interactive map of Guanshan Riverside Park
- Type: park
- Location: Songshan, Taipei, Taiwan
- Coordinates: 25°04′03.6″N 121°34′10.9″E
- Area: 27.22 hectares (67.3 acres)
- Public transit: Gangqian Station

The Guanshan Riverside Park (traditional Chinese: 觀山河濱公園; simplified Chinese: 观山河滨公园; pinyin: Guānshān Hébīn Gōngyuán) is a park along the Keelung River in Songshan District of Taipei, Taiwan.

== Geology ==
The park spans over an area of 27.22 hectares. The park is equipped with water supply facilities.

== Transportation ==
The park is accessible within walking distance south of Gangqian Station of Taipei Metro.

== See also ==
- List of parks in Taiwan
- Yingfeng Riverside Park
- Guanshan Waterfront Park
