= Gangqian metro station =

Metro station in Taipei, Taiwan

Gangqian 港墘
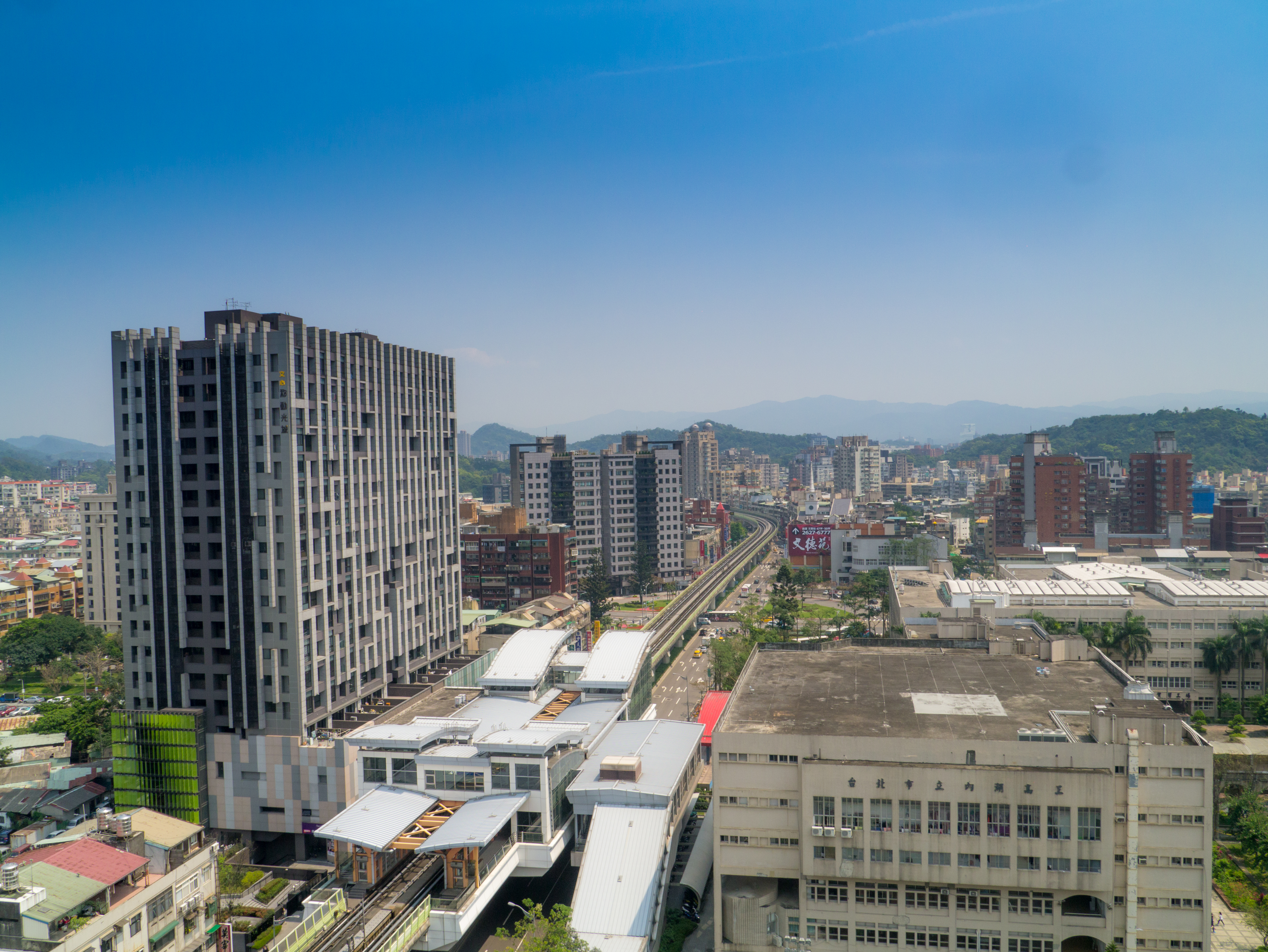
- Gangqian station

Chinese name
- Chinese: 港墘
Transcriptions
Standard Mandarin
- Hanyu Pinyin: Gǎngqián
- Bopomofo: ㄍㄤˇㄑㄧㄢˊ
- Wade–Giles: Kang³-ch'ian²
Hakka
- Pha̍k-fa-sṳ: Kóng-khièn
Southern Min
- Tâi-lô: Káng-kînn

General information
- Location: No. 663, Sec. 1, Neihu Rd. Neihu, Taipei; Taiwan
- Coordinates: 25.080088°N 121.575124°E
- Operator: Taipei Metro
- Line: Wenhu line
- Connections: Bus stop

Construction
- Structure type: Elevated

Other information
- Station code: BR17

History
- Opened: 4 July 2009

Passengers
- daily (December 2024)
- Rank: 59 out of 109

Services
| Preceding station | Taipei Metro | Following station |
|---|---|---|
| Xihu towards Taipei Zoo | Wenhu line | Wende towards Nangang Exhib Center |
Location

The Taipei Metro Gangqian station is located in the Neihu District in Taipei, Taiwan. It is a station on Wenhu line.

== Station overview ==
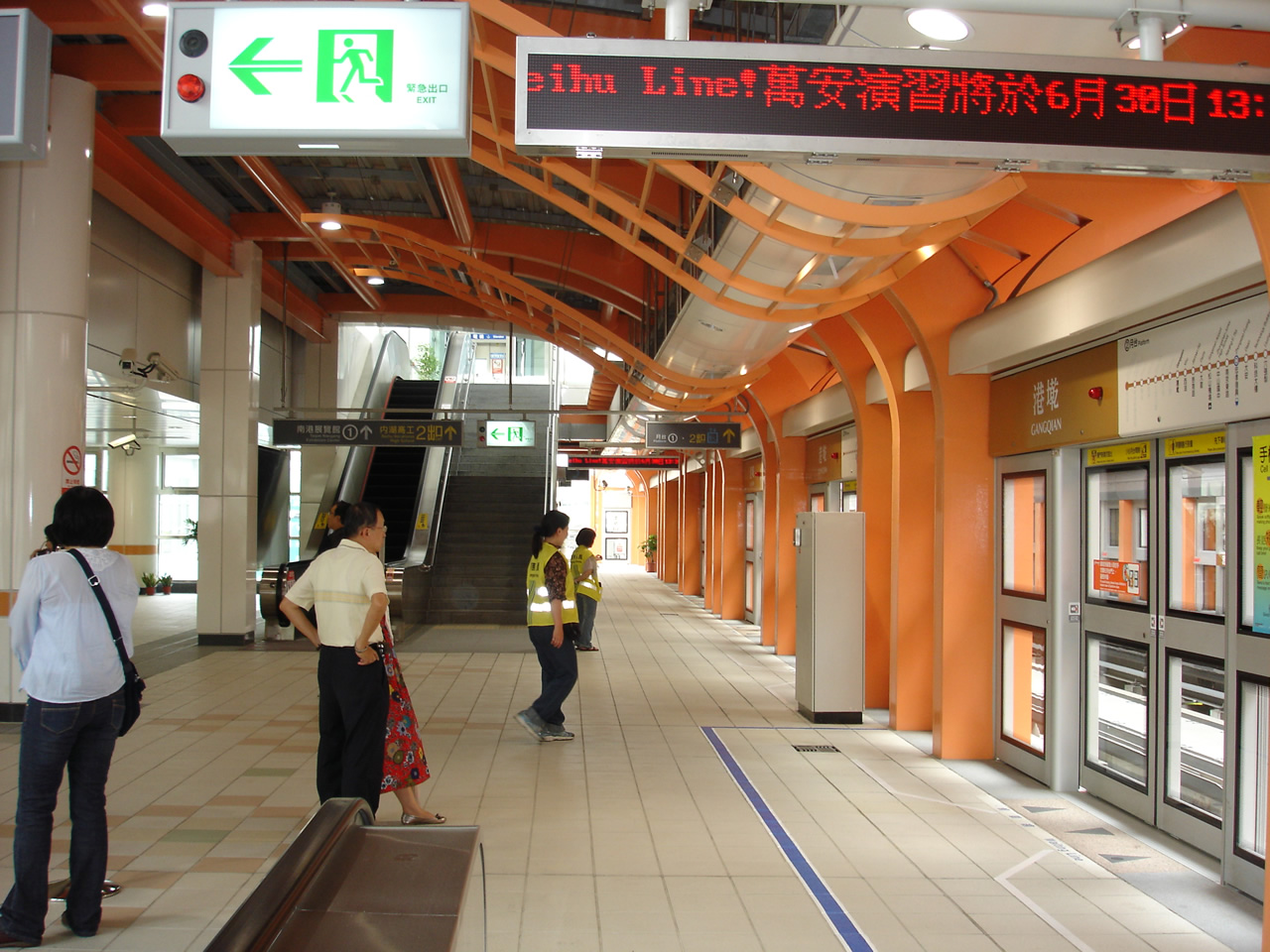
Gangqian station platform

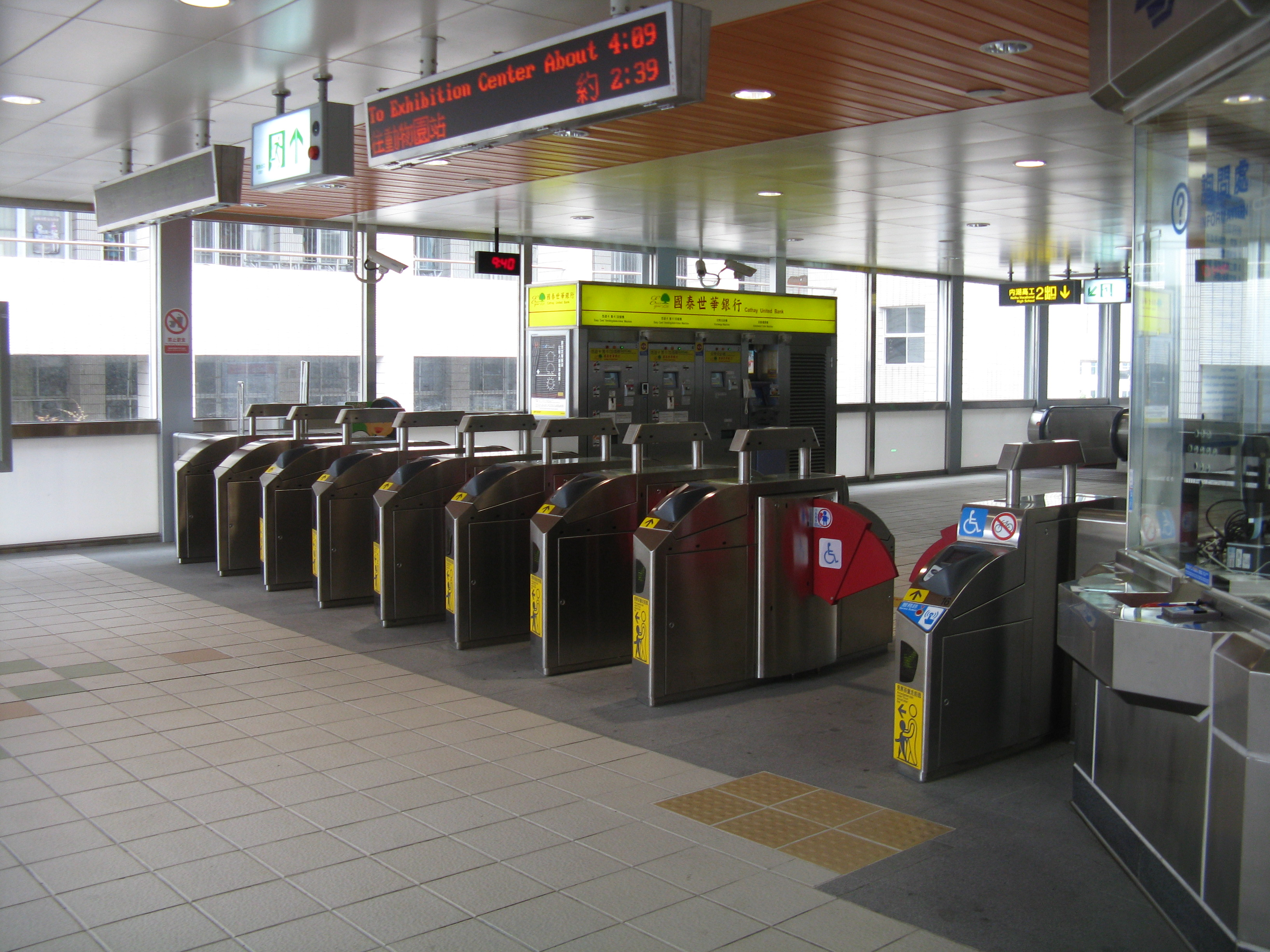
Gangqian station concourse

This three-level, elevated station features two side platforms, two exits, and platform elevators located on the north and south sides of the concourse level.

Public art for the station is situated on the wall above the escalators. The piece, titled "The Paradise of Neihu", is a large-scale mixed media artwork consisting of needlepoint created with the help of 83 artists and volunteers.

== History ==
- 22 February 2009: Gangqian station construction is completed.
- 4 July 2009: Begins service with the opening of the Brown line.

== Station layout ==
| 4F | Connecting level | Overhead bridge |
3F
| 3F | South Concourse | Information desk, automatic ticket dispensing machine One-way faregates, escalator towards exit 2 |
| 3F | Side platform, doors will open on the right |
| 3F | Platform 1 | ← Wenhu line toward Taipei Nangang Exhibition Center (BR18 Wende) |
| 3F | Platform 2 | → Wenhu line toward Taipei Zoo (BR16 Xihu) → |
| 3F | Side platform, doors will open on the right |
| 3F | North Concourse | Information desk, automatic ticket dispensing machine, one-way faregates Restrooms, escalator towards exit 1 |

1F
| 1F | Street level | Entrance/exit |

== Gallery ==
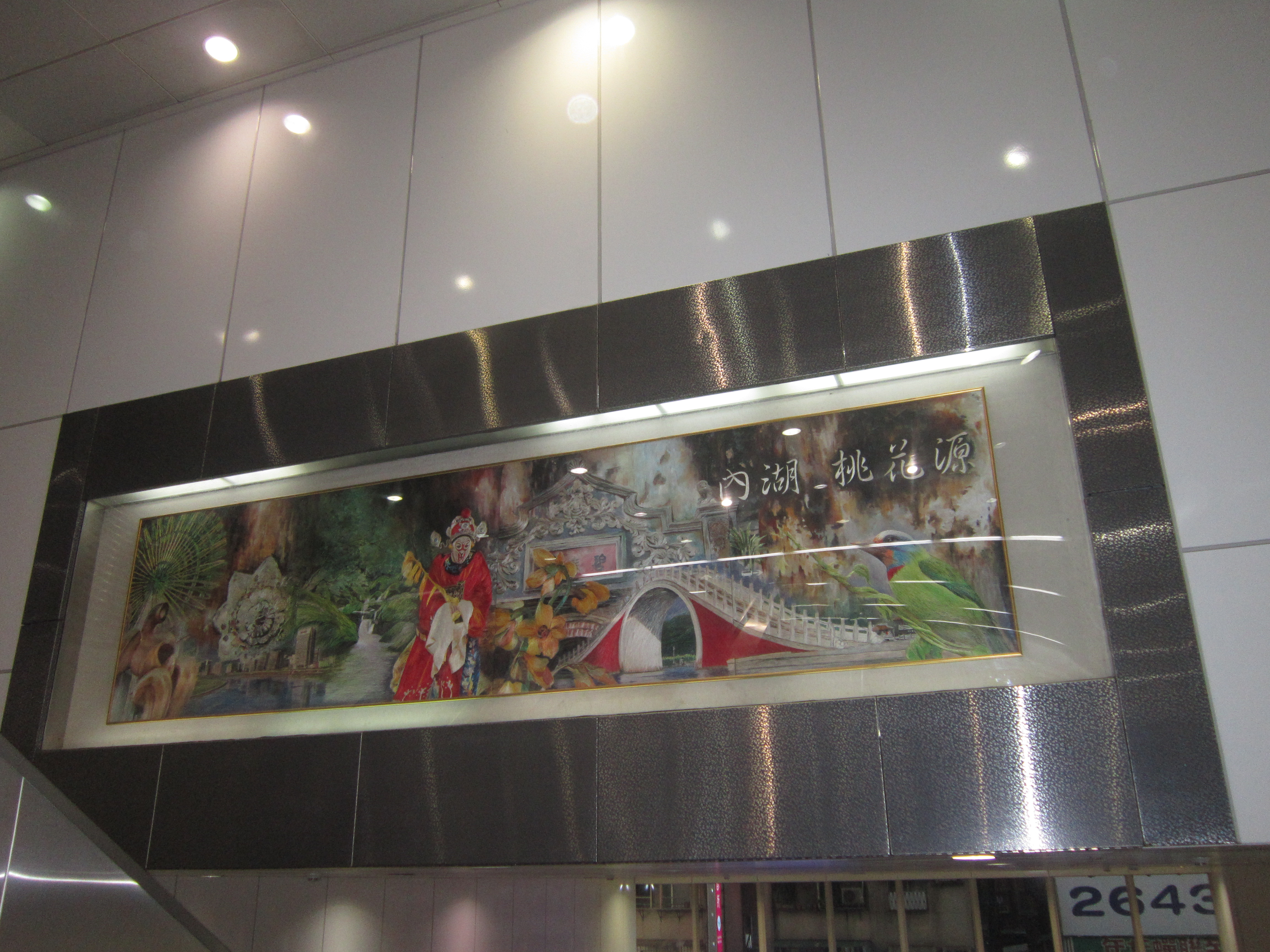
Gangqian station public art "The Beauty of Neihu"

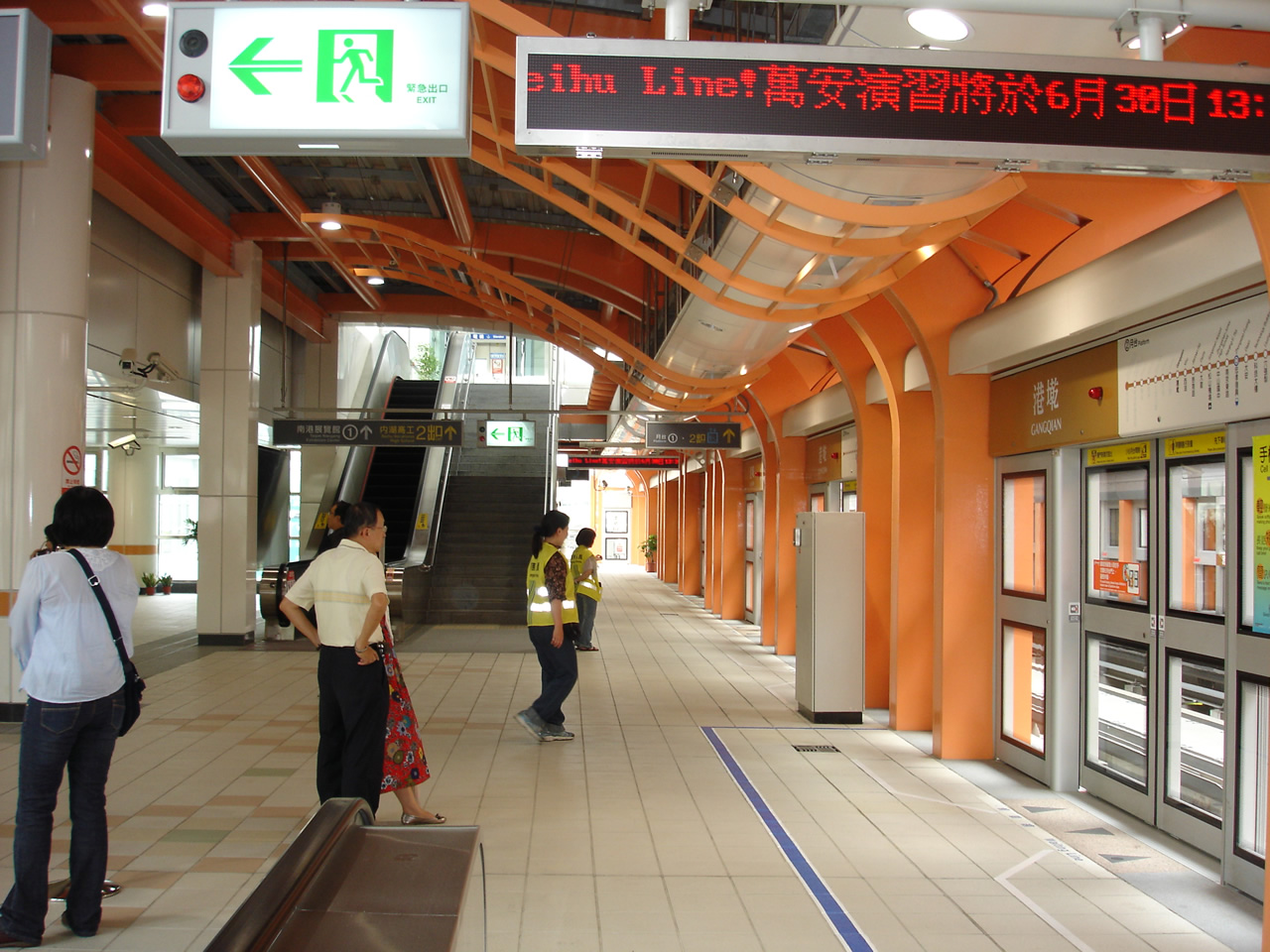
Gangqian station platform 1 (to Taipei Zoo)

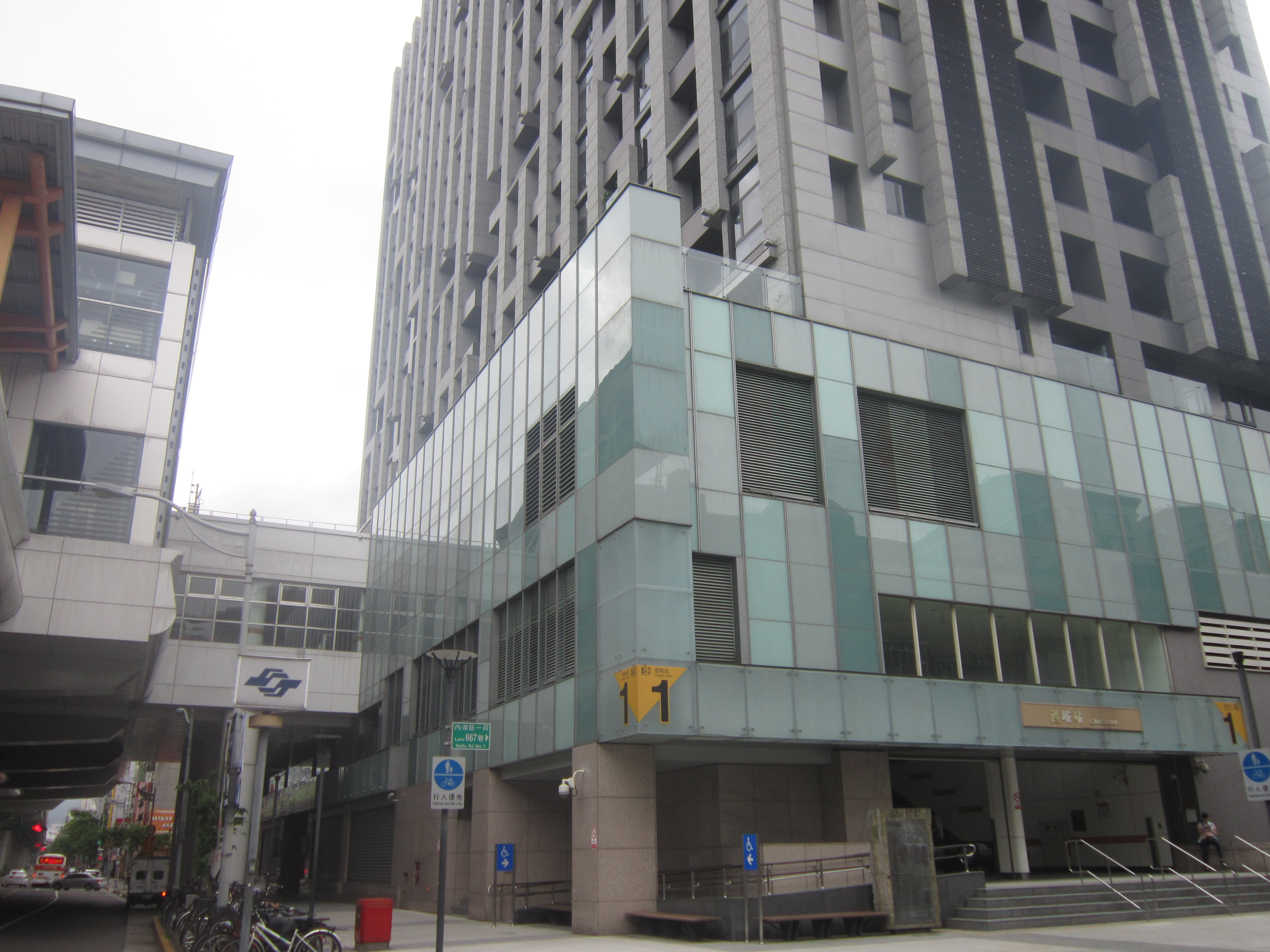
Gangqian station gateway 1

== Nearby places ==
- Guanshan Riverside Park
- Neihu Technology Park
- Taipei Municipal Nei-Hu Vocational High School
- Neihu Community College
- Taipei Flower Market
- Lishan Elementary School
- Lishan Junior High School
- Lishan High School
- Neihu Sports Center
