= Neihu (disambiguation) =

Neihu is a district of Taipei City, Taiwan.

Neihu may also refer to:

- Neihu, Lufeng, Guangdong, a township-level division in China
- Neihu Line, Taipei Metro, part of the Wenhu (brown) line of the Taipei Metro
  - Neihu metro station, a station of the Taipei Metro
