= Nangang =

Nangang may refer to:

== Mainland China ==
- Nan'gang District, Harbin (南岗区) in Harbin, Heilongjiang Province
- Nan'gang station (Guangzhou Metro) (南岗站) in Huangpu District, Guangzhou, Guangdong Province
- Nan'gang station (Hefei Metro) (南岗站), on Line 2 (Hefei Metro) in Shushan District, Hefei, Anhui Province
- Nangang Church

== Taiwan ==
- Nangang District, Taipei (南港區)
  - Nangang station (南港站), metro, Taiwan Railways, and Taiwan High Speed Rail station in Nangang, Taipei
  - Nangang Software Park
    - Nangang Software Park metro station
  - Taipei Nangang Exhibition Center
    - Taipei Nangang Exhibition Center metro station
