= Donghu Station =

Donghu Station (simplified Chinese: 东湖站; traditional Chinese: 東湖站) may refer to:

- Donghu Station (Guangzhou), a station of the Guangzhou Metro
- Donghu Station (Taipei Metro), a station of the Taipei Metro
