= Huzhou Station =

Huzhou Station may refer to:

- Huzhou railway station, a railway station of the China Railway.
- Huzhou metro station, a new metro station of the Taipei Metro.
