= Wende metro station =

Metro station in Taipei, Taiwan

Wende 文德
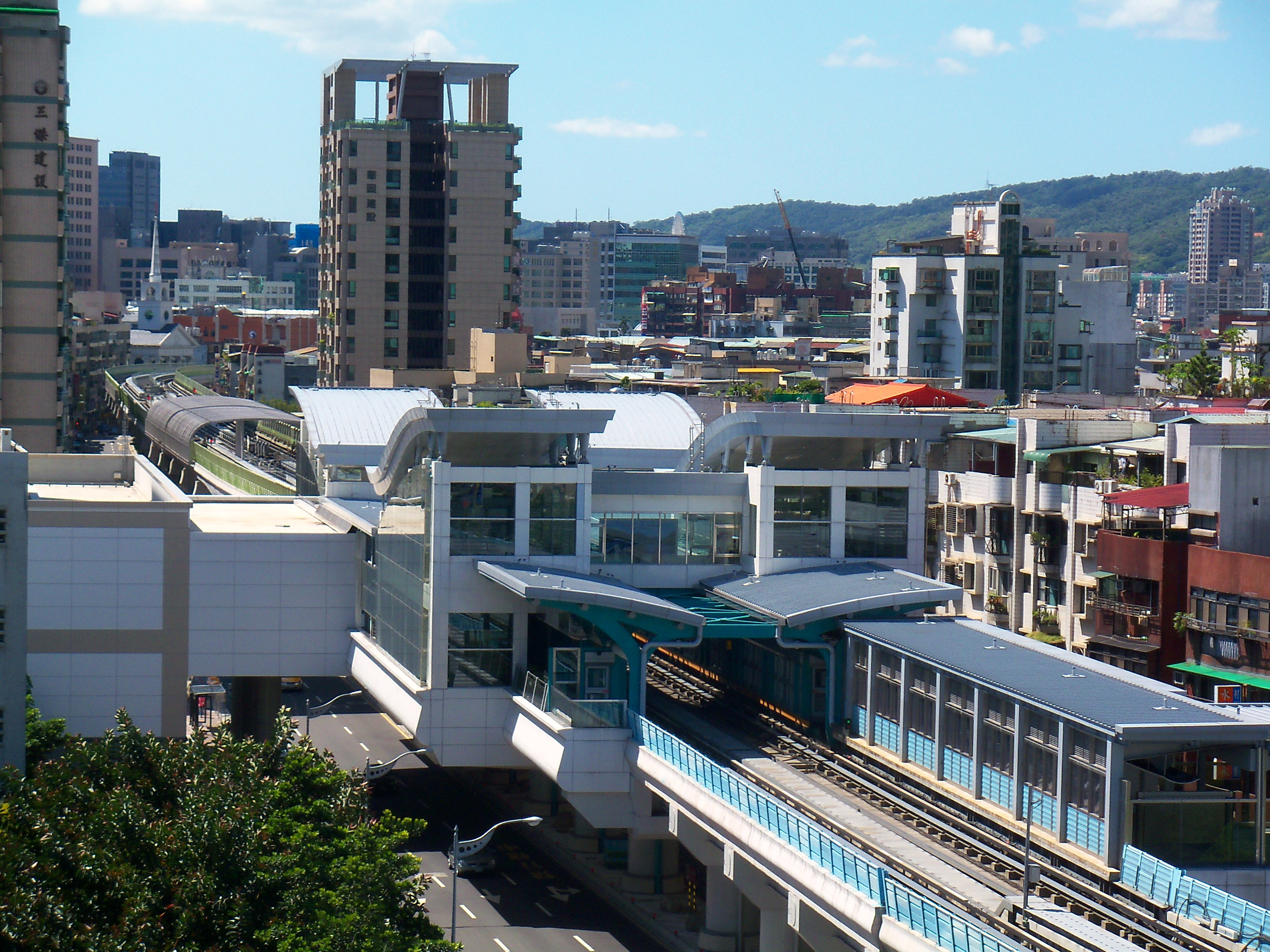
- Wende station

Chinese name
- Chinese: 文德
Transcriptions
Standard Mandarin
- Hanyu Pinyin: Wéndé
- Bopomofo: ㄨㄣˊ ㄉㄜˊ
Hakka
- Pha̍k-fa-sṳ: Vùn-tet
Southern Min
- Tâi-lô: Bûn-tik

General information
- Location: No. 214, Wende Rd. Neihu, Taipei; Taiwan
- Coordinates: 25.078734°N 121.584754°E
- Operator: Taipei Metro
- Line: Wenhu line
- Connections: Bus stop

Construction
- Structure type: Elevated

Other information
- Station code: BR18

History
- Opened: 4 July 2009

Passengers
- daily (December 2024)
- Rank: 97 out of 109

Services
Preceding station	Taipei Metro	Following station
Gangqian towards Taipei Zoo	Wenhu line	Neihu towards Nangang Exhib Center
Location

The Taipei Metro Wende station is located in the Neihu District in Taipei, Taiwan. It is a station on the Brown line.

== Station overview ==
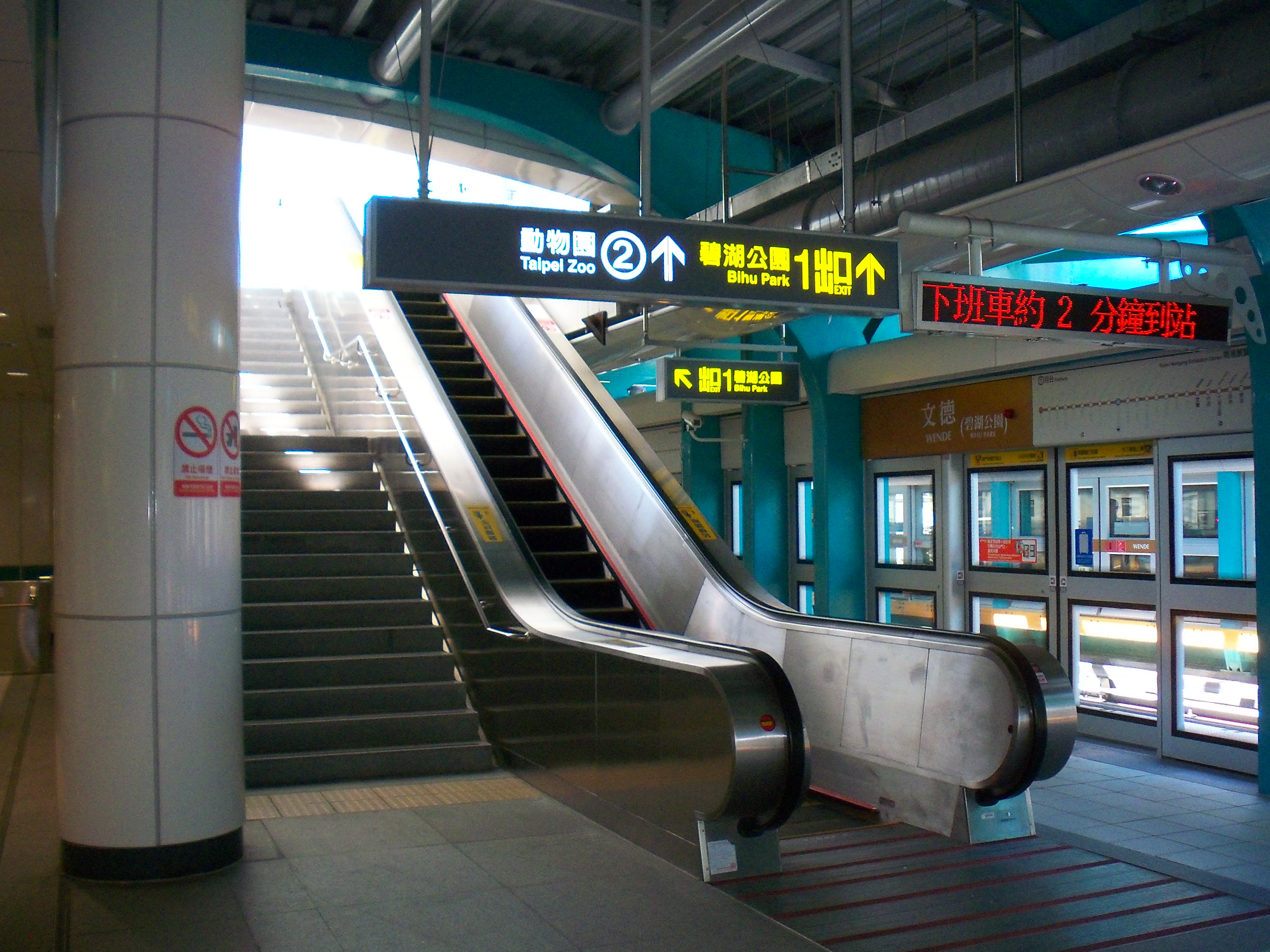
Wende station escalator and platform

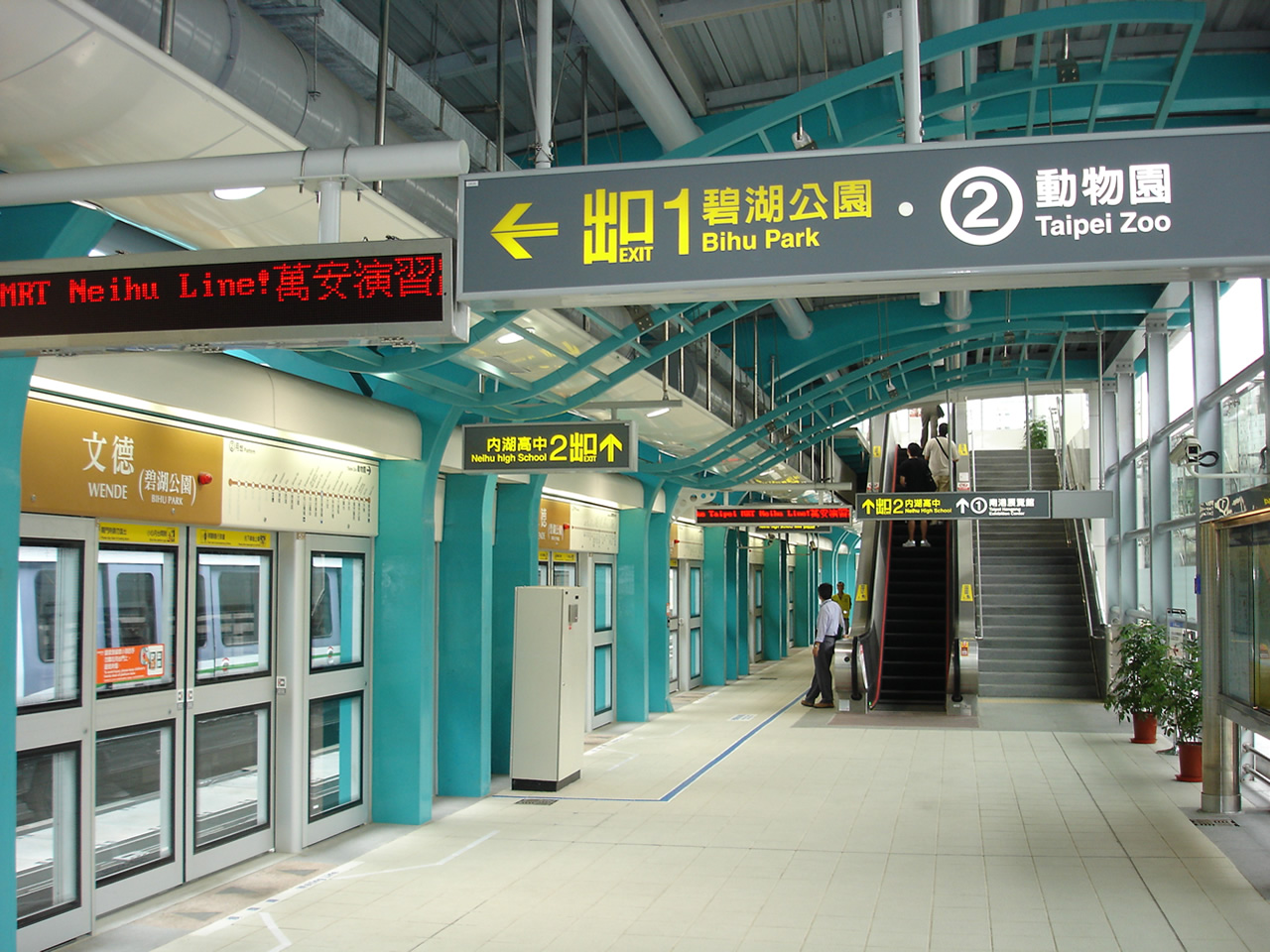
Wende station platform

This two-level, elevated station features two side platforms, two exits, and a platform elevator located on the north side of the concourse level.

Public art for the station consists of a piece titled "Dancing Birds". It comprises one of the station walls and depicts dancing egrets in Bihu Park with the use of digital images and mosaic inlaying.

Two mechanical parking towers behind the station allow for over 300 parking spaces. The towers are a type of elevator parking system; vehicles can be parked and retrieved on the same rotating lift table.

== History ==
- 22 February 2009: Wende station construction is completed.
- 4 July 2009: Begins operations with the opening of the Brown line.

== Station layout ==
3F	Connecting level	Overhead bridge
2F
2F	South Concourse	Information desk, automatic ticket dispensing machine, one-way faregates Restrooms, escalator towards exit 2
2F	Side platform, doors will open on the right
2F	Platform 1	← Wenhu line toward Taipei Nangang Exhibition Center (BR19 Neihu)
2F	Platform 2	→ Wenhu line toward Taipei Zoo (BR17 Gangqian) →
2F	Side platform, doors will open on the right
2F	North Concourse	Information desk, automatic ticket dispensing machine, one-way faregates restrooms, escalator towards exit 1

1F
1F	Street level	Entrance/exit

== Around the station ==
- Neihu High School
- Neihu Junior High School
- Neihu Elementary School
- National Taiwan College of Performing Arts
- Guo Ziyi Memorial Hall
- Liuzhongyuan Community
- Bihu Park
- Yangguan Park
- Wende Park No. 2
- Ronald McDonald House Taiwan
- Fire Safety Museum of Taipei City Fire Department
