= Huzhou (disambiguation) =

Huzhou is a prefecture-level city in northern Zhejiang province.

Huzhou may also refer to:

- Huzhou Channel (湖州频道), a channel of Huzhou Radio and Television Station (湖州广播电视总台).
- Huzhou railway station, a railway station of the China Railway.
- Huzhou metro station, a metro station of the Taipei Metro.

== See also ==
- Huzhou–Hangzhou high-speed railway
