= Bihu Park =

Park in Neihu, Taipei, Taiwan

- 碧湖公園
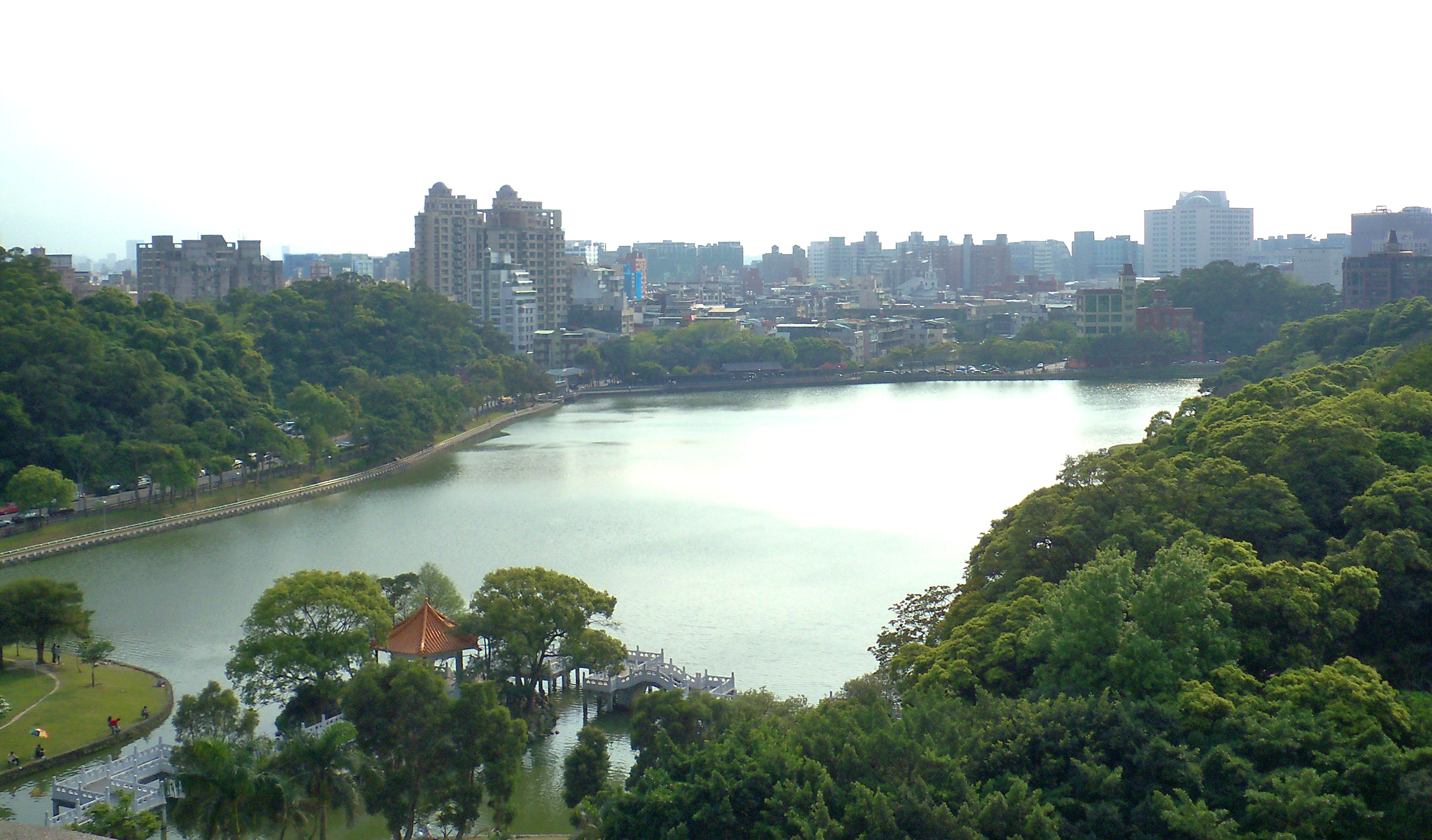
- Interactive map of Bihu Park
- Type: urban park
- Location: Neihu, Taipei, Taiwan
- Coordinates: 25°04′57.5″N 121°35′00.2″E
- Area: 13.1 hectares (32 acres)
- Opened: 1987

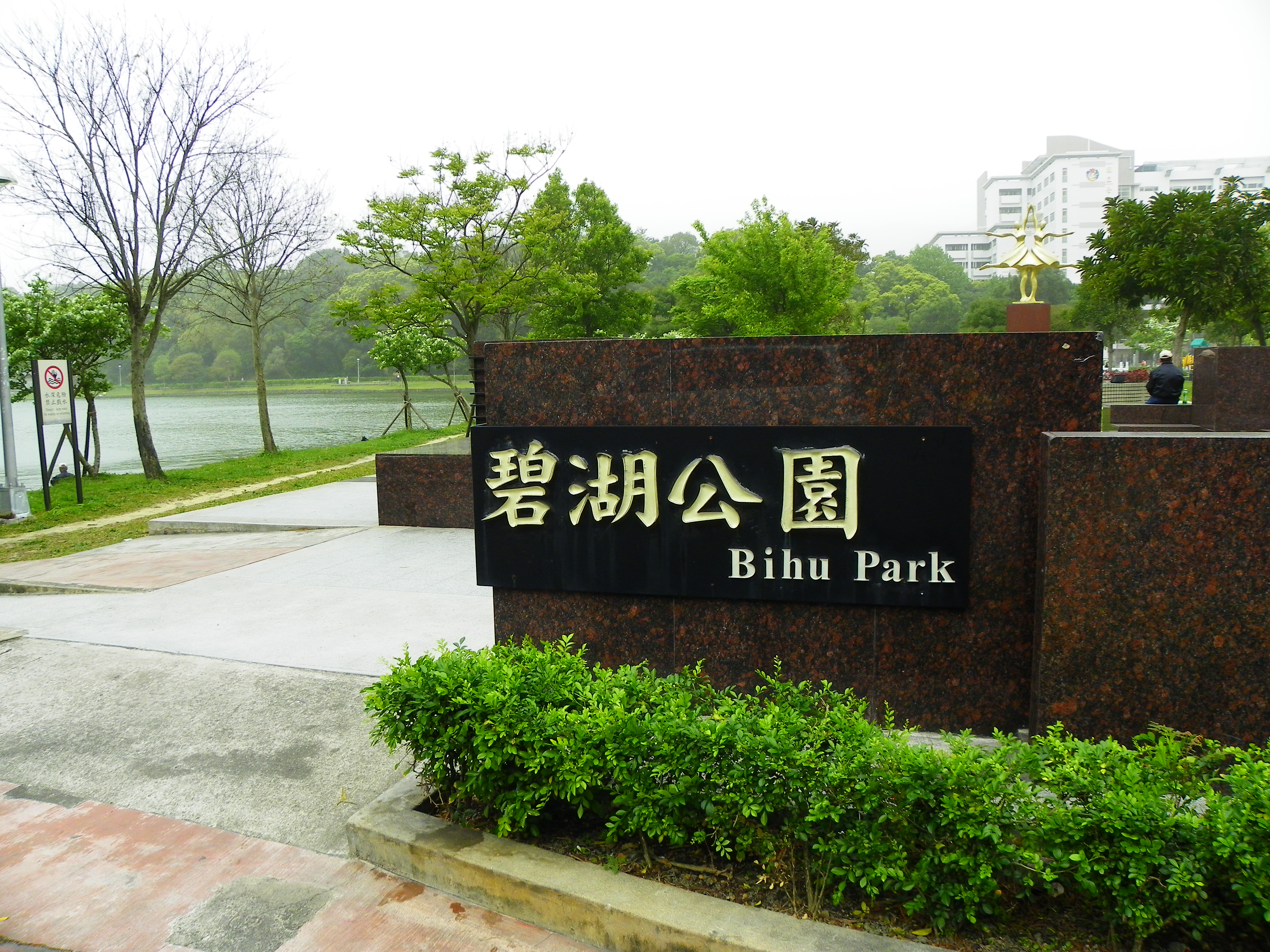
Bihu Park entrance

The Bihu Park (traditional Chinese: 碧湖公園; simplified Chinese: 碧湖公园; pinyin: Bìhú Gōngyuán) is a park in Neihu District, Taipei, Taiwan.

== History ==
The park was opened in 1987.

== Geography ==
The park covers an area of 13.1 hectares. The 7-hectare Dapi Lake, located within the park area, was once used for farming irrigation. The lake has a large population of invasive Amazon sailfin catfish.

== Features ==
The park features the lakeside walkways which was completed and opened to public in 2007 with a total distance of 1.4 km. There is also a nine-turn bridge. It houses various flora as well, such as willows, bald cypresses, cajeput trees, golden showers, royal poincianas, Chinese hibiscus, azaleas and Ixora westii. The park management center houses a 45-seating capacity reading room, tennis courts, swimming pool and other recreational facilities. Visitors can also fish and hike in its six mountain trails to choose from with rest pavilions along the way.

== Transportation ==
The park is accessible within walking distance north from Wende Station of Taipei Metro.

== See also ==
- List of parks in Taiwan
