= Taiwan Electrical and Electronic Manufacturers' Association =

Organization based in Neihu, Taipei, Taiwan

- 台灣區電機電子工業同業公會
- Abbreviation: TEEMA
- Formation: 1948
- Headquarters: Neihu, Taipei, Taiwan
- Members: 3,036
- Chairperson: Richard Lee
- Website: Official website

The Taiwan Electrical and Electronic Manufacturers' Association (TEEMA; traditional Chinese: 台灣區電機電子工業同業公會; simplified Chinese: 台湾区电机电子工业同业公会; pinyin: Táiwān Qū Diànjī Diànzǐ Gōngyè Tóngyègōnghuì) is an organization based in Neihu District, Taipei, Taiwan.

== History ==
The organization was founded in 1948.

== Memberships ==
The organization consists of 3,036 members. It represents 16 product categories.
