= Dahu Park =

Park in Neihu, Taipei, Taiwan

- 大湖公園
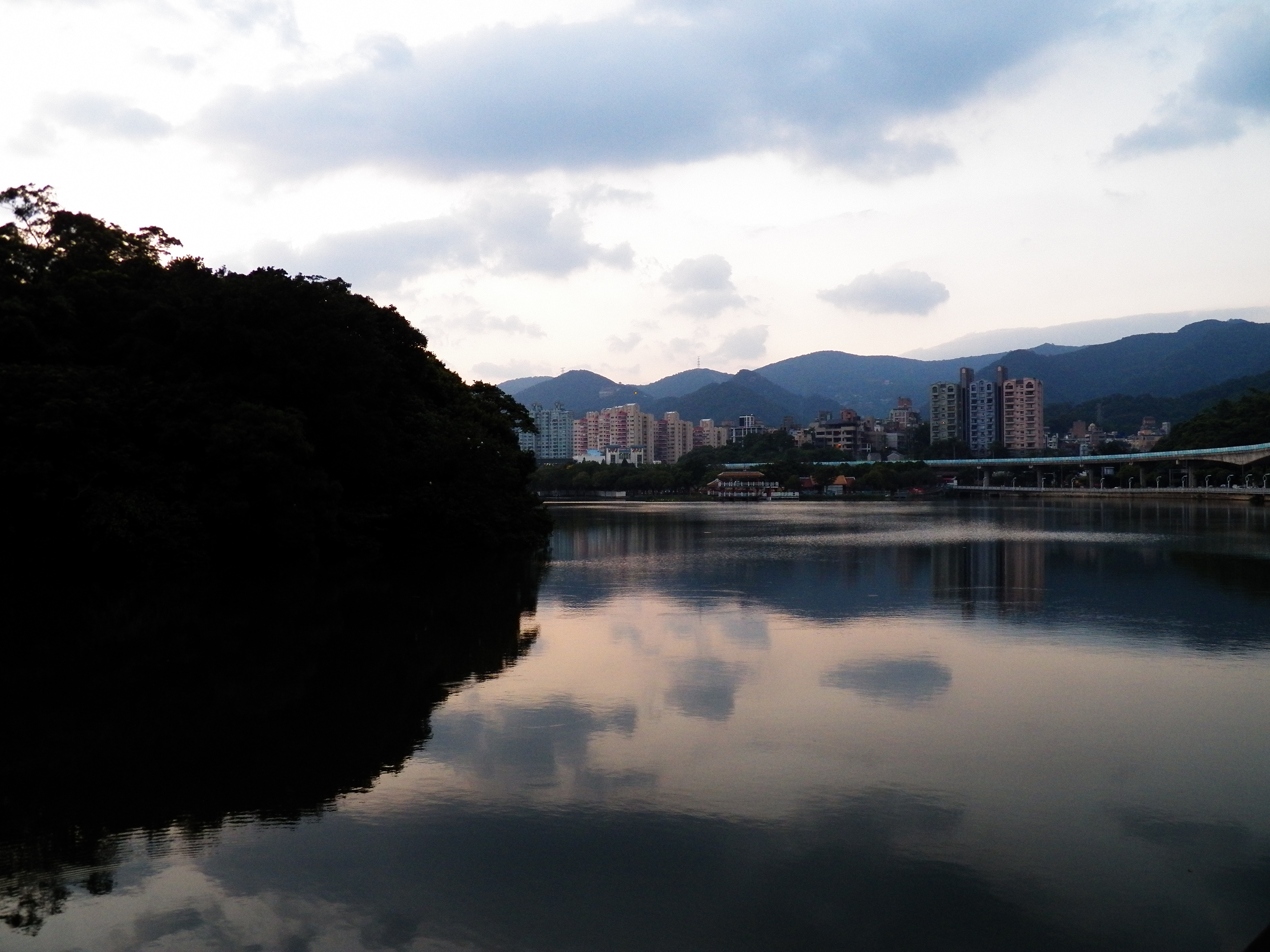
- Interactive map of Dahu Park
- Type: Park
- Location: Neihu, Taipei, Taiwan
- Coordinates: 25°04′56″N 121°36′17″E
- Established: 1979
- Public transit: Dahu Park Station

Dahu Park (traditional Chinese: 大湖公園; simplified Chinese: 大湖公园; pinyin: Dàhú Gōngyuán) is a park in Neihu District, Taipei, Taiwan. It is located at the base of Bailusi Mountain (白鷺鷥山).

== History ==
Dahu Park was constructed in 1979. The park serves as a floodable park in the event of heavy rainfall.

== Architecture ==
The park has a 13-hectare lake crossed by the Jindai Bridge (Moon Bridge). It also has a heated swimming pool, steam room, sauna, water slide, and other facilities.

== Things to do ==
There are multiple hiking trails around the park, including trails leading up to the peak of the nearby Bailusi Mountain, which overlooks the entire park.

Fishing is allowed in restricted zones.

== Transportation ==
The park is accessible from Dahu Park Station of the Taipei Metro.

== See also ==
- List of parks in Taiwan
- List of tourist attractions in Taiwan
