= Taipei Municipal Lishan Senior High School =

Coordinates: 25°05′08.00″N 121°34′40.00″E

- 100 Huanshan Rd. Neihu District Taipei 114

Information
- Type: Municipal Lishan Senior High School
- Motto: To be sagacious, distinguished and thankful. (前瞻、卓越、感恩、回饋)
- Established: 2000
- School district: Neihu, Taipei, Taiwan
- Principal: Ke Ming-Shu
- Faculty: 25 Teachers
- Grades: 11 Classes each grade, 33 for total.
- Enrollment: About 990 Students
- Information: 886-2-26570435
- Measure: 4.53 km^{2}
- Website: http://www.lssh.tp.edu.tw

Lishan High School (Taipei Municipal Lishan High School 臺北市立麗山高級中學, LSSH for short) is a senior high school in Neihu District, Taipei City, Taiwan.

The school was planned in the year 1991. At first, the school was named Lishan Science Experimental High School, and planned to recruit excellent science-aptitude students nationwide, but the city council overruled the decision. So the government canceled the proposal and started to build the school in 1993. Finally, the school established in 2000.

== History ==
- 2000 The school established and started, the first headmaster is Zheng Xian-San (鄭顯三).
- 2004 The school started the first science-aptitude class.
- 2005 Chen Wei-Hong (陳偉泓) become the second headmaster, and in the same year, LSSH started the first sport aptitude class.
- 2007
  - LSSH joins the Microsoft's Taiwan School Of The Future Education Programme.
  - LSSH started the exchange programme with Bethany School.
- 2008 LSSH started the exchange programme with the French School Of Singapore.

== Research studies ==
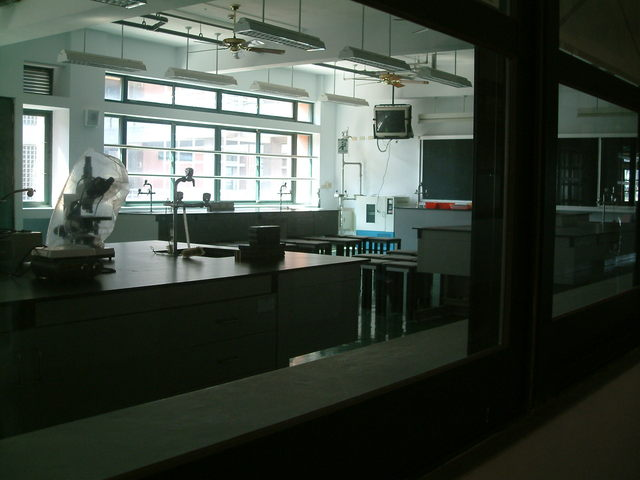
Chemistry Laboratory

Research Studies Courses are taken by every 11th grade student in LSSH. The lesson is to make students discover the facts that they are interested in and try to solve it by themselves. In other school, only students in science-aptitude class can have to opportunity to do research; but in LSSH, every student has their own chance.

Every year, the best of the student's research projects will be chosen to join to science fair. LSSH has got many prizes from this type of competition, especially in the Intel International Science and Engineering Fair.

In 10th grade, students will have Research Methods Lessons for a preparatory course of Research Studies.

Here are the subjects that students can choose for their Research Studies:

- About Art and Literature: Chinese, English, Social Science, (Art).
- About Geo-Science: Geography, Geology and Astronomy.
- About Science: Chemistry, Physics, Biology.
- About Engineering: Electrical-Engineering.
