= Taipei Municipal Neihu Senior High School =

臺北市立內湖高級中學
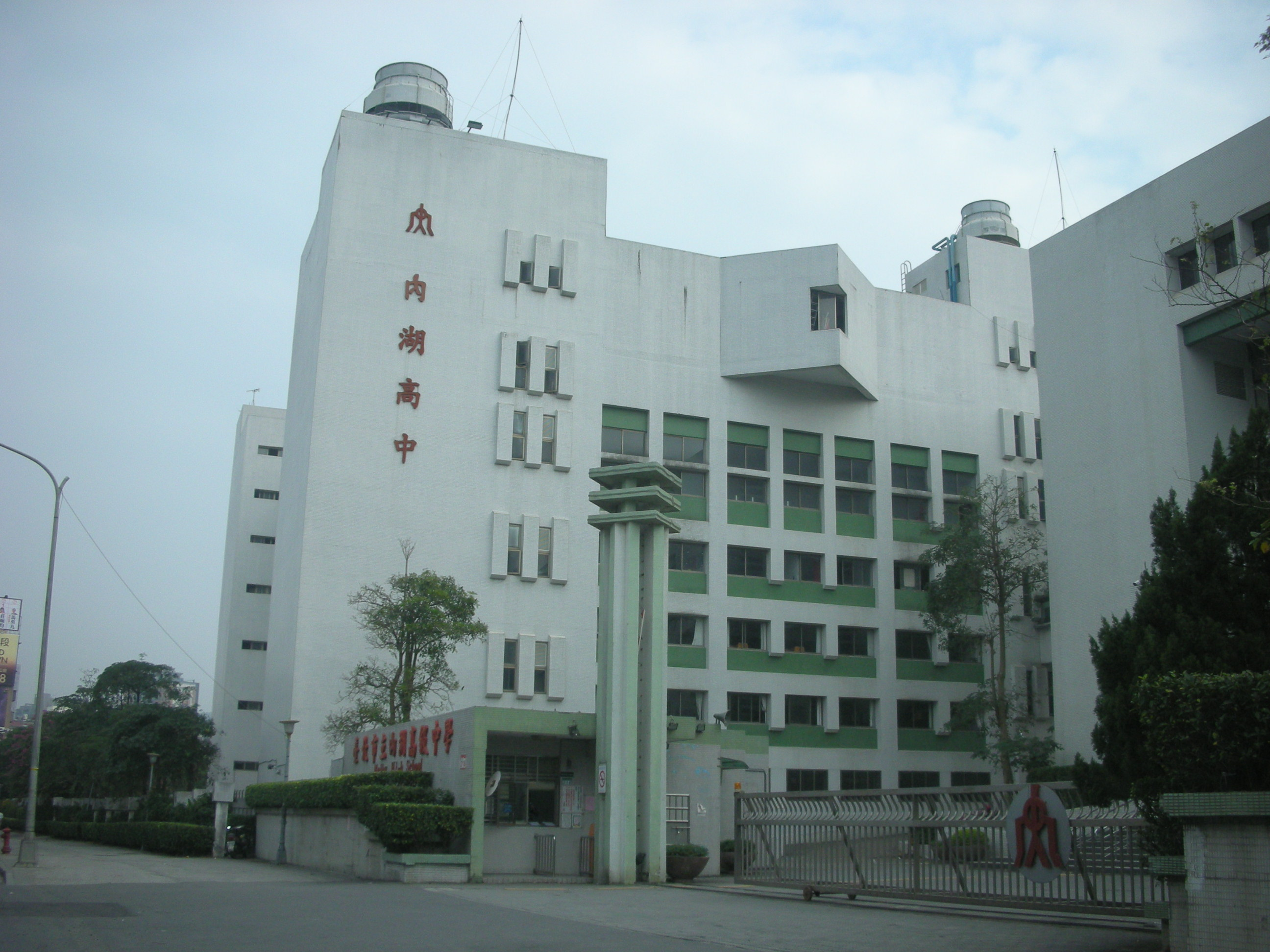

Location
- No. 218 Wende Road, Neihu District, Taipei City, Taiwan, R.O.C. 114
- Coordinates: 25.078389°N 121.586566°E

Information
- Type: Municipal high school
- Established: 1988
- School district: Neihu District, Taipei City, Taiwan
- Principal: Wu-chu Chou (Chinese: 周寤竹)
- Staff: 188
- Faculty: 152
- Grades: 59 classes
- Enrollment: 2,245
- Campus area: 37,927 square meters
- Website: www.nhsh.tp.edu.tw

Taipei Municipal Neihu Senior High School (NHSH; Chinese: 臺北市立內湖高中, Tongyong Pinyin: taibei shihli neihu gaojhong, Hanyu Pinyin: taibei shili neihu gaozhong, Wade–Giles: tai2bei3 shih4li4 nei4hu2 gao1chong1) is a public 3-year high school in Taipei City, Taiwan, Republic of China.

== Introduction ==
Neihu Senior High School is the first senior high school established after Taipei City was converted into a special municipality under the direct jurisdiction of the central government. Campus construction began in July 1986. The school was completely established on August 1, 1988 and enrolled the first 18 classes of freshmen.

The campus is located near the foot of lush hills, surrounded by crystal-clear lakes, and adorned with green and white schoolhouses.

With the current service of the Wenhu Line (Brown Line) of Taipei Metro, the convenience of transportation will help enrollment growth.

== History ==
Taipei Municipal Neihu Senior High School (NHSH), also known as “Windy Castle”, is the first high school built after Taiwan's capital (Taipei) was converted into a special municipality under the direct jurisdiction of the central government of the Republic of China in Taiwan. The first principal, Mr Lin, Huei, started to design and construct the classroom buildings in July 1986. Two years later, on August 1, 1988, the school was completely established and enrolled the first eighteen classes of freshmen. It currently has sixty-one classes. The school attracts students from the Neihu District and the Greater Taipei area.

The second principal, Mr Ye, Wen-Tang, assumed office in August 1996. The current principal, Mr Lin, Shin-Yaw assumed office in August 2001.

== Location ==
The school is located in the northeast of the Taipei Basin. To its north and south, the premises face lush mountains. East of the campus is an area dedicated to track and field, with a 300-meter track. There is also a multi-function activity center. The south is an indoor 8-lap, 50-meter long, heated swimming pool. To its west and south is Tzu-Yang Park.

== See also ==
- Education in Taiwan
