= Dahu Park metro station =

Metro station in Taipei, Taiwan

Dahu Park 大湖公園
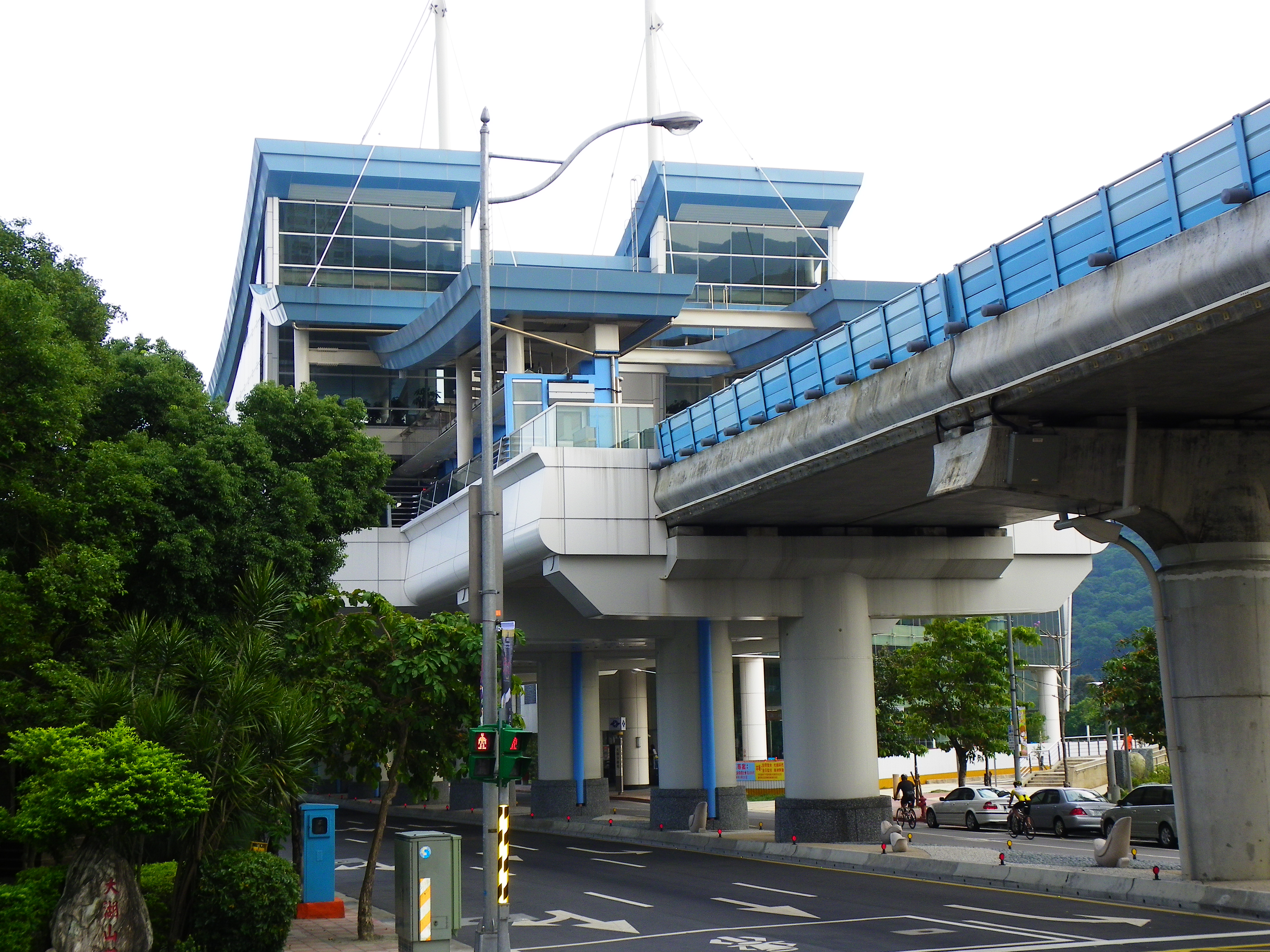
- Dahu Park Station's sailboat architecture

Chinese name
- Traditional Chinese: 大湖公園
- Simplified Chinese: 大湖公园
- Literal meaning: Big lake park
Transcriptions
Standard Mandarin
- Hanyu Pinyin: Dàhú Gōngyuán
- Bopomofo: ㄉㄚˋ ㄏㄨˊ ㄍㄨㄥ ㄩㄢˊ
Hakka
- Pha̍k-fa-sṳ: Thai-fù Kûng-yèn
Southern Min
- Tâi-lô: Tuā-ôo Kong-hn̂g

General information
- Location: No. 256, Sec. 1, Neihu Rd. Neihu, Taipei; Taiwan
- Coordinates: 25.083527°N 121.60242°E
- Operator: Taipei Metro
- Line: Wenhu line
- Connections: Bus stop

Construction
- Structure type: Elevated

Other information
- Station code: BR20

History
- Opened: 4 July 2009

Passengers
- daily (December 2024)
- Rank: 104 out of 109

Services
Preceding station	Taipei Metro	Following station
Neihu towards Taipei Zoo	Wenhu line	Huzhou towards Nangang Exhib Center
Location

The Taipei Metro Dahu Park station is located north of Dahu Park in Neihu District, Taipei, Taiwan. It is a station on Wenhu line.

== Station overview ==
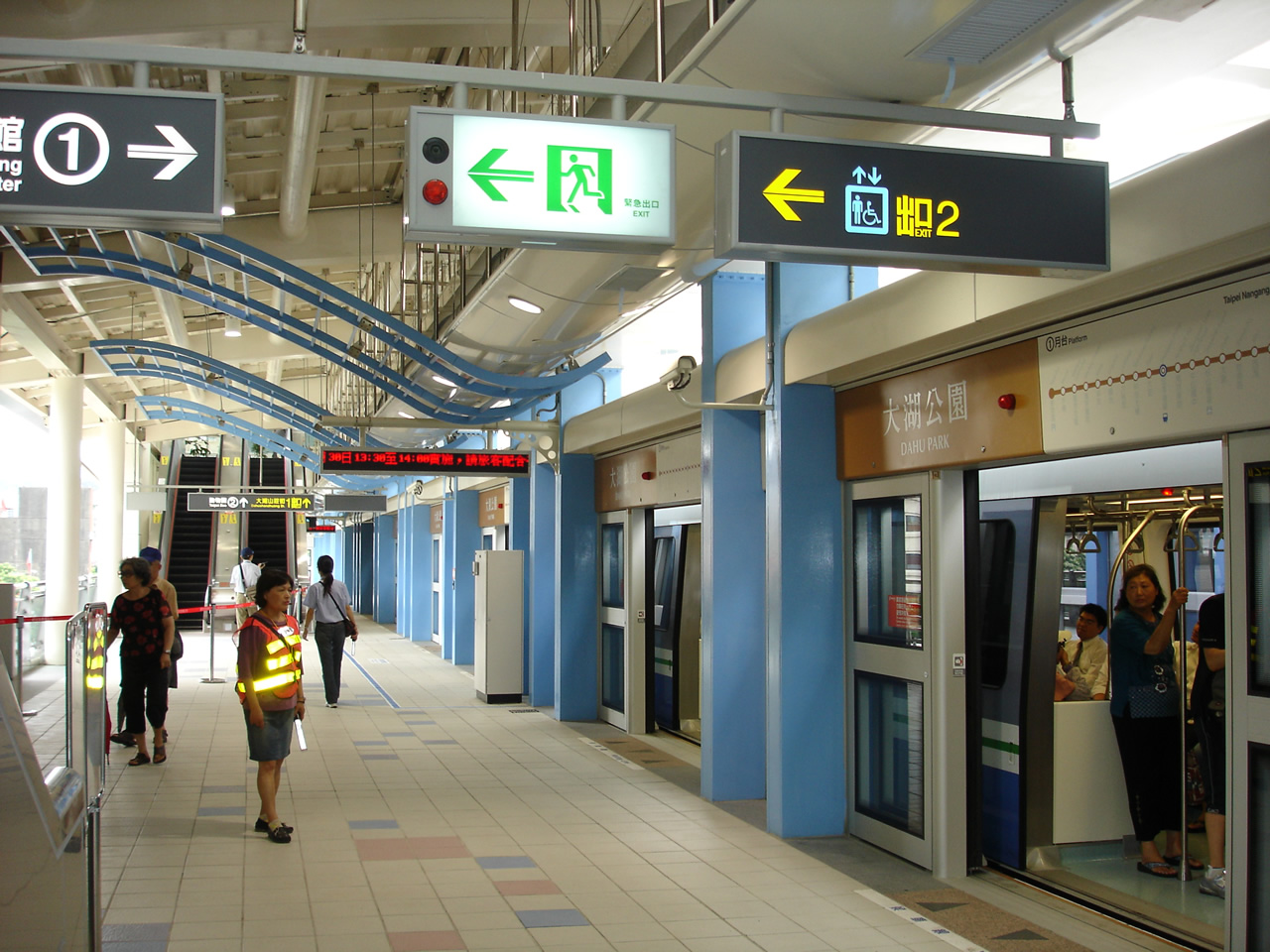
Dahu Park station platform

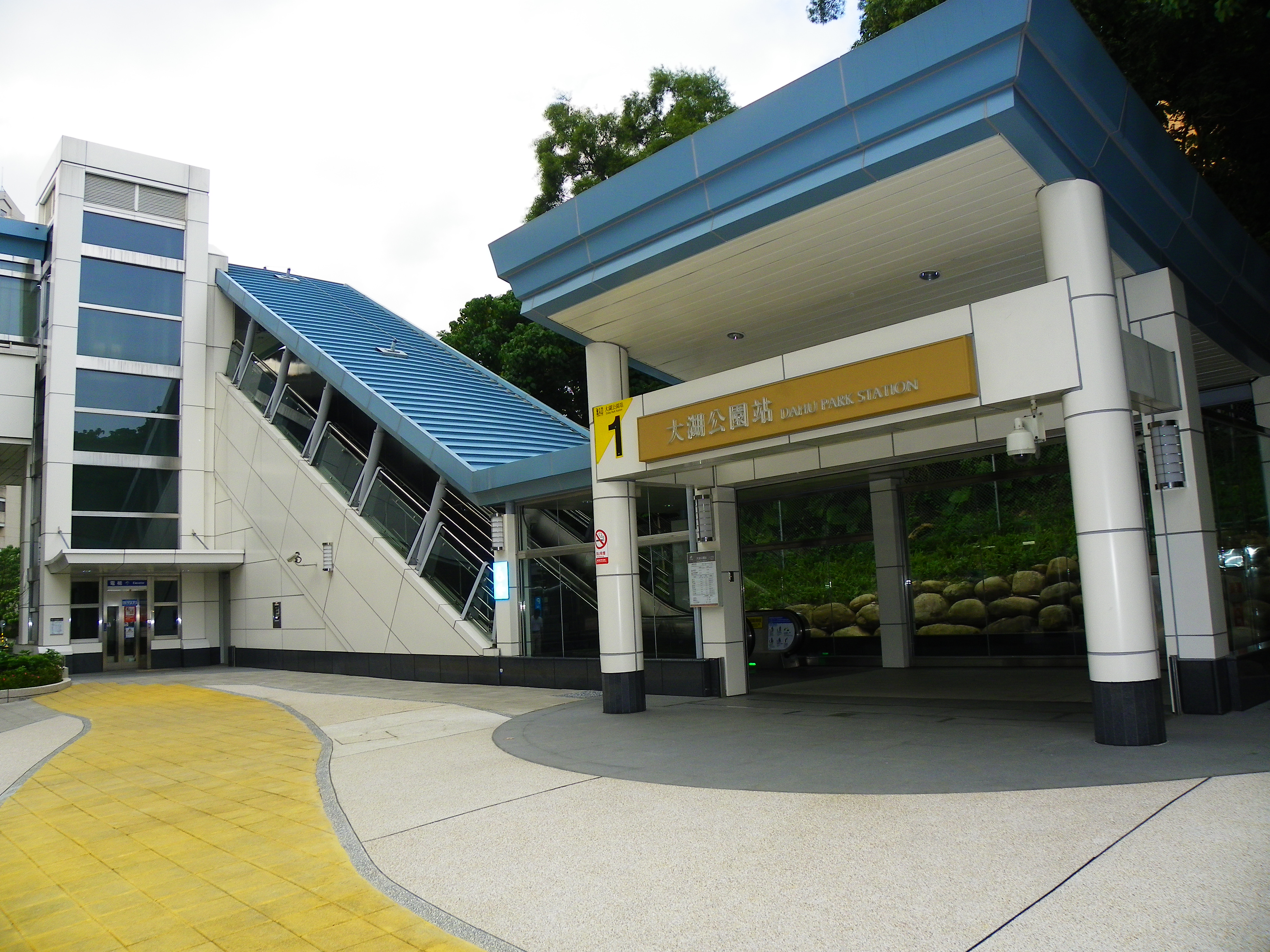
Dahu Park station exit 1

This three-level, elevated station features two side platforms, two exits, and platform elevators located on the north and south sides of the concourse level. It is named for the nearby Dahu Park, visible from the system between Dahu Park and Huzhou.

Public art for the station is titled "Flying Kites at Home in the Sky"; it consists of 12 sculptures and is located around the entrance area. While the glass walls of the entrance area resemble an aquarium, the kites give the illusion of aquatic animals floating in the tank.

== History ==
- 22 February 2009: Dahu Park station construction was completed.
- 4 July 2009: Service began with the opening of the Brown line.

== Station layout ==
4F	Connecting level	Overhead bridge
3F
3F	South Concourse	Information desk, automatic ticket dispensing machine, one-way faregates Restrooms, escalators toward exit 2
3F	Side platform, doors will open on the right
3F	Platform 1	← Wenhu line toward Taipei Nangang Exhibition Center (BR21 Huzhou)
3F	Platform 2	→ Wenhu line toward Taipei Zoo (BR19 Neihu) →
3F	Side platform, doors will open on the right
3F	North Concourse	Information desk, automatic ticket dispensing machine, one-way faregates Restrooms, escalators toward exit 1

2F
2F	Middle level	Stairs, escalators for changing platforms

1F
1F	Street level	Entrance/exit

== Nearby places ==
- Dahu Park
- Hushan Park No. 5
- Dahu Cottage
- Dahu Elementary School
- Dahu Community
- Bailusishan
