= Guo Ziyi Memorial Hall =

Historic house in Neihu, Taipei, Taiwan

- 郭子儀紀念堂
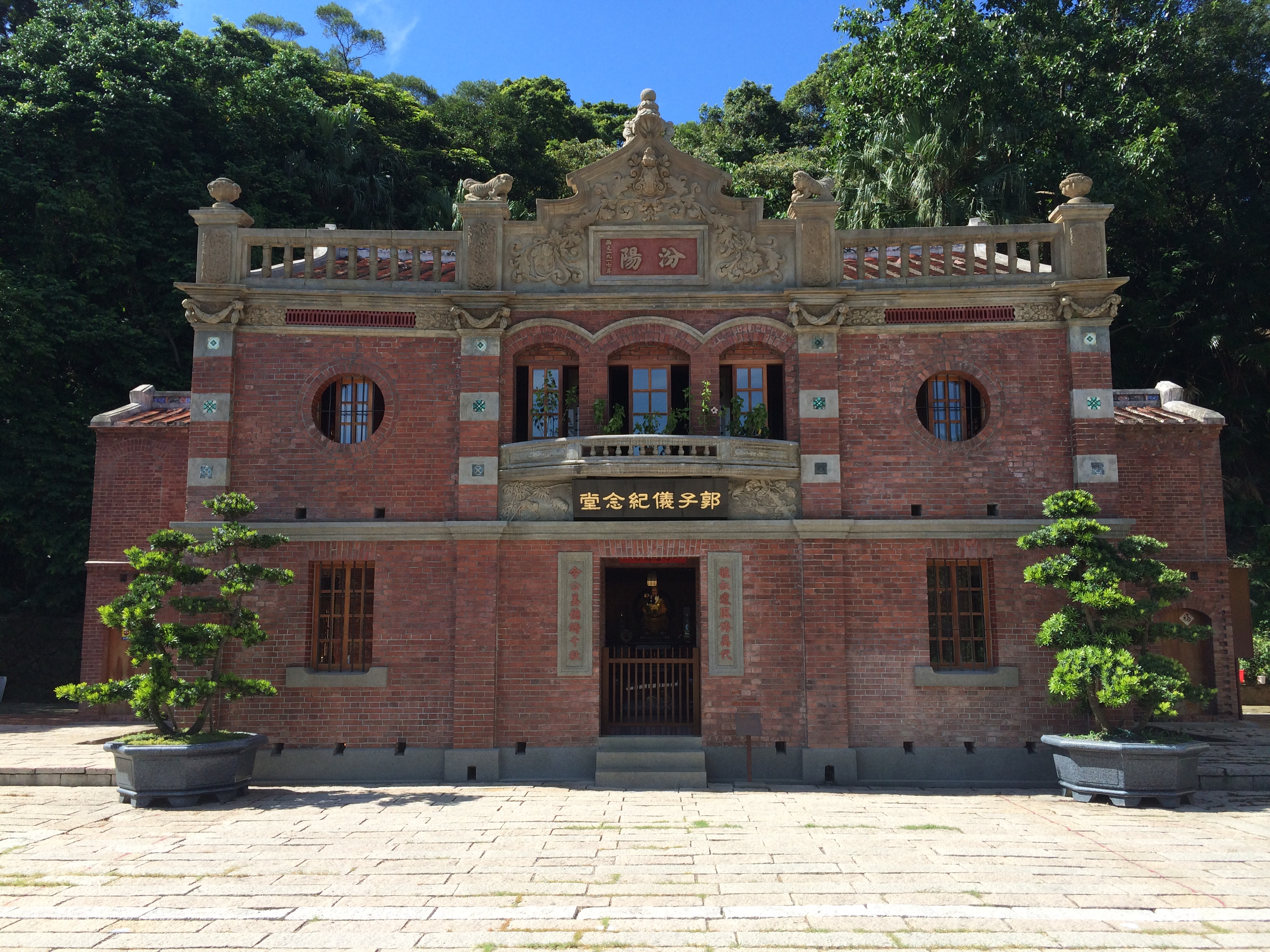
- Interactive map of the Guo Ziyi Memorial Hall area

General information
- Type: former residence
- Architectural style: western
- Location: Neihu, Taipei, Taiwan
- Coordinates: 25°4′46.5″N 121°35′11.7″E
- Completed: 1917
- Opened: 3 February 2012
- Cost: NT$50 million (renovation)

Technical details
- Floor count: 2
- Floor area: 426.2 m^{2}

Design and construction
- Architect: Guo Hua-xi

The Guo Ziyi Memorial Hall (traditional Chinese: 郭子儀紀念堂; simplified Chinese: 郭子仪纪念堂; pinyin: Guōziyí Jìniàn Táng) or Neihu Red House, formerly known as Neihu Guo Family Estate or Neihu Kuo Family Ancestral Home, is a historical building in Neihu District, Taipei, Taiwan.

== History ==
The building was originally built in 1917 during the Japanese rule of Taiwan by Guo Hua-xi, the borough chief of Neihu Village. It then became the home for the first Neihu Village mayor, Kuo Hua-jang (郭華讓), who took office in 1920. In 1999, the building was designated as a historical building by the Taipei City Government. In 2010, the building was renovated by the efforts made by World Guo's Clan Association President Kuo Shih-chi with a cost of NT$50 million. NT$30 million of the fund was donated by the association and another NT$10 million by the city government. It was then officially opened on 3 February 2012 to honor the Tang dynasty general Guo Ziyi.

== Architecture ==
The building is a two-story Western-style red brick structure that spreads over an area of 1,178 m^{2} in the shape of a T. Its wall is decorated with Baroque-style washed terrazzo, earthen sculptures, and colored tiles from Japan. The floors were made of wood and supported by fir wood beams. The beams were painted and traditional Taiwanese censers and lanterns are hung. The balcony is of an arch shape. It also features a small shop.

== Exhibitions ==
The building exhibits various documents on Tang dynasty poets, calligraphy and paintings.

== Transportation ==
The building is accessible within walking distance northeast of Wende Station of Taipei Metro.

== See also ==
- List of tourist attractions in Taiwan
