= Donghu metro station =

Metro station in Taipei, Taiwan

Donghu / SB10 東湖
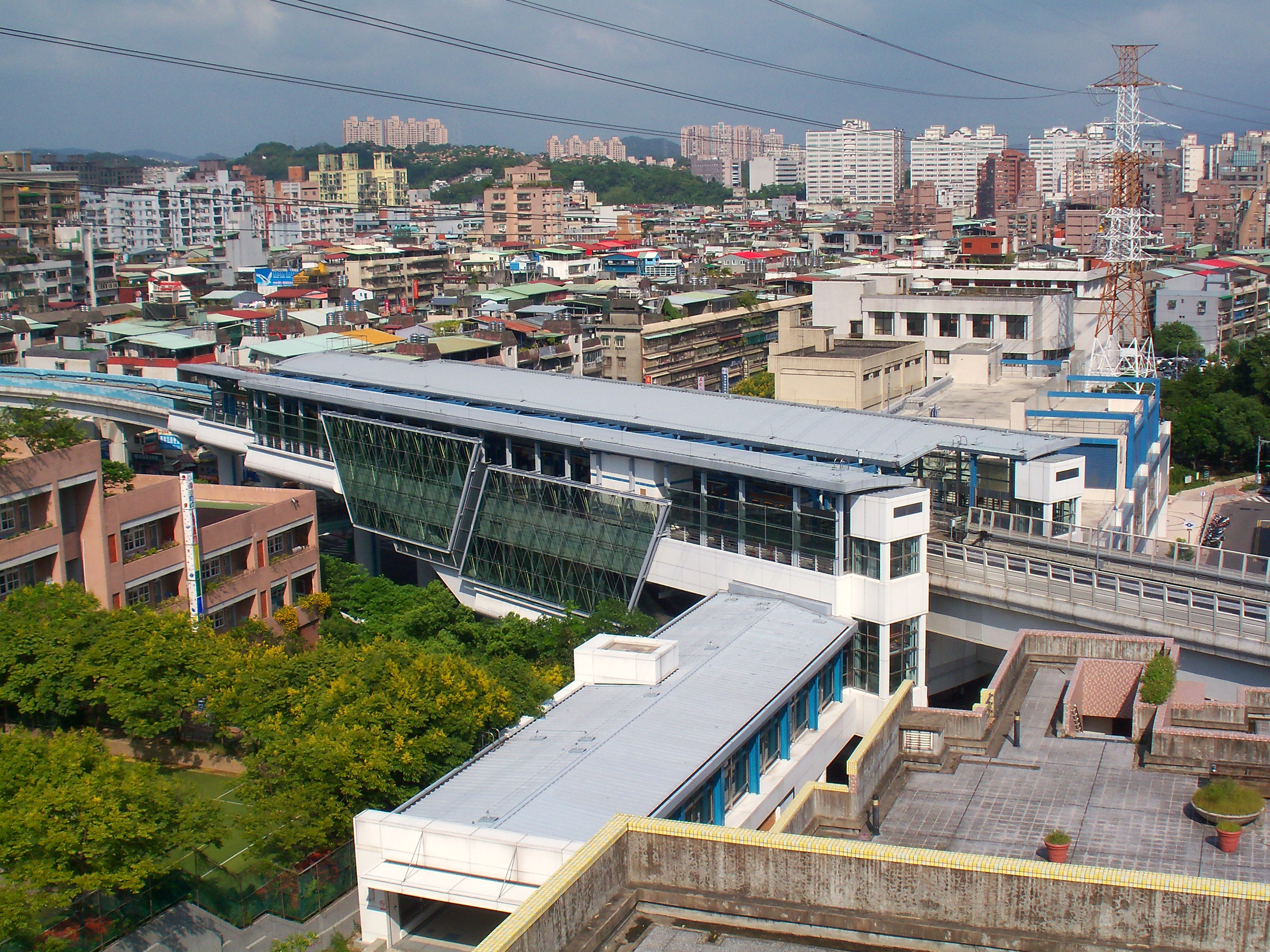
- Donghu station

Chinese name
- Traditional Chinese: 東湖
- Simplified Chinese: 东湖
- Literal meaning: East lake
Transcriptions
Standard Mandarin
- Hanyu Pinyin: Dōnghú
- Bopomofo: ㄉㄨㄥ ㄏㄨˊ
- Wade–Giles: Tung¹-hu²
Hakka
- Pha̍k-fa-sṳ: Tûng-fù
Southern Min
- Tâi-lô: Tang-ôo

General information
- Location: No. 235, Sec. 3, Kangning Rd. Neihu, Taipei; Taiwan
- Coordinates: 25.067262°N 121.611488°E
- Operated by: Taipei Metro
- Line: Wenhu line (BR22)
- Connections: Bus stop

Construction
- Structure type: Elevated

Other information
- Station code: / SB10

History
- Opened: 4 July 2009

Passengers
- daily (December 2024)
- Rank: Unknown

Services
Preceding station	Taipei Metro	Following station
Huzhou towards Taipei Zoo	Wenhu line	Nangang Software Park towards Nangang Exhib Center
Huluzhou towards Dadaocheng	Minsheng–Xizhi line	Xiashehou towards Xizhi
Location

The Taipei Metro Donghu station is located in the Neihu District in Taipei, Taiwan. It is a station on Wenhu line.

== Station overview ==
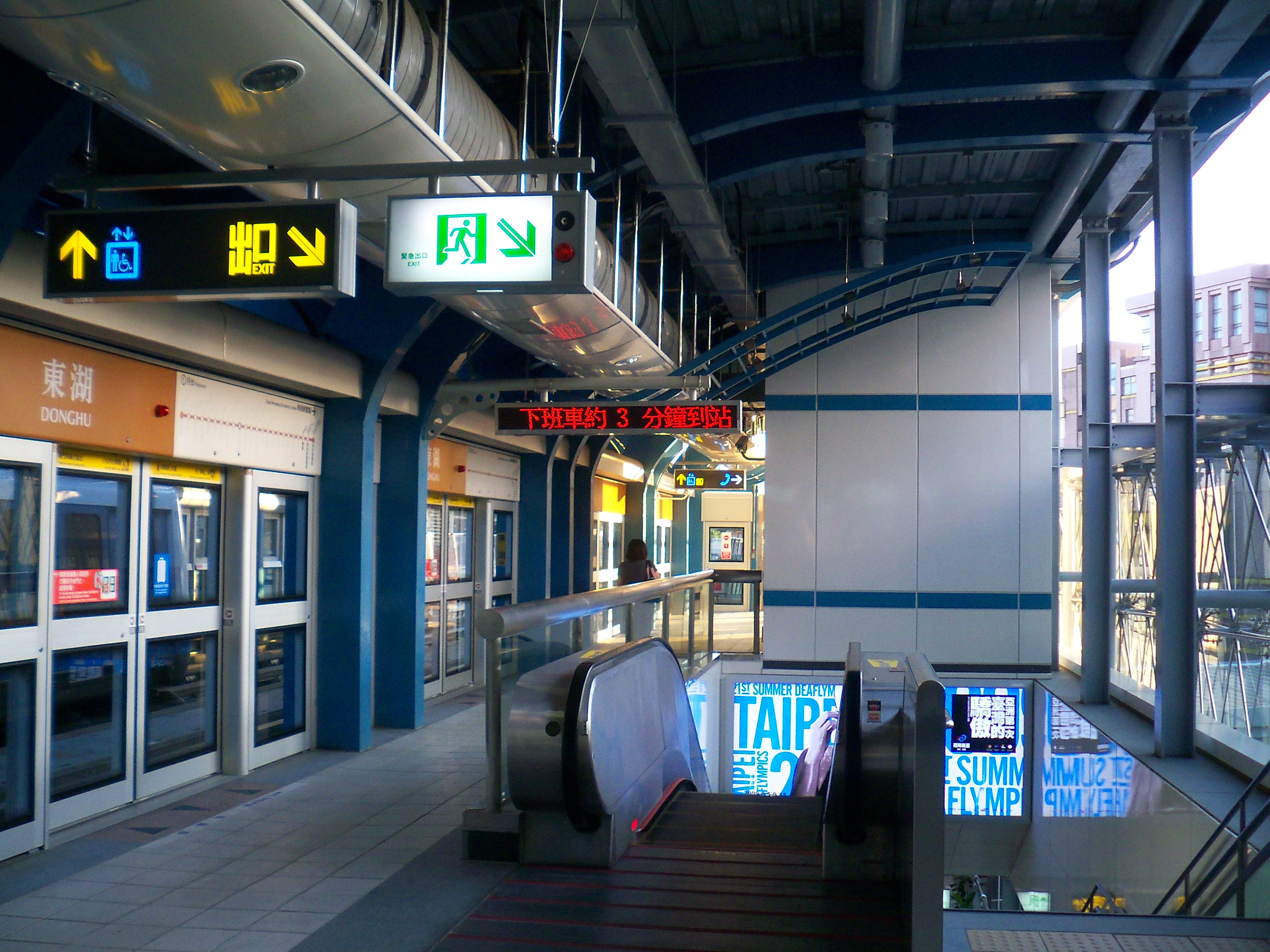
Donghu station platform

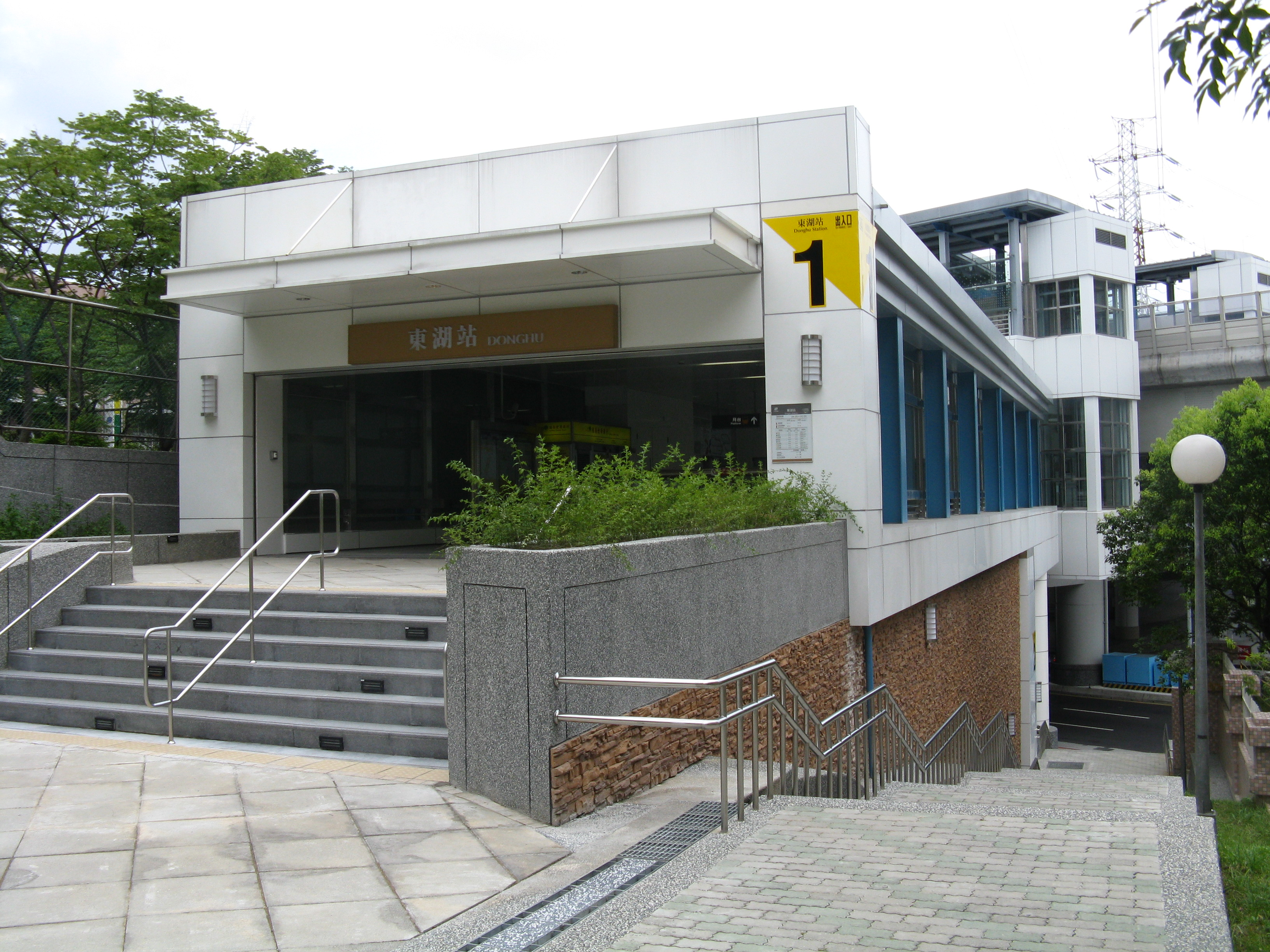
Donghu station exit 1

This three-level, elevated station features two side platforms, three exits, and a platform elevator located on the north side of the concourse level. It is located on Kangning Road, Sec. 3.

The station is 83 meters long and 21.5 meters wide, while the platform is 93.5 meters long. The station's height is 20 meters (the equivalent of a six-story building) to accommodate the Wufen Road footbridge. It has thus been called the "Zenith Station" and is the tallest station on the Taipei Metro.

=== Design ===
The station design theme is "Music". Surface designs in the station square represent a dancing musical staff. Silk fabric is printed on enamel slab art walls at the concourse level to represent romantic urban music.

Located next to the entrance, public art for the station is titled "The Rippling Lake". Porcelain and celadon are used to create ripples on the art piece.

== History ==
- December 2007: Station structure reaches completion.
- 22 February 2009: Donghu station construction is completed.
- 4 July 2009: Begins service with the opening of Brown Line.

This station is a planned transfer for the Minsheng–Xizhi line. The contract for a new MRT line to connect Taipei's Donghu station to New Taipei's Xizhi station was awarded in October 2024. The construction is expected to begin in 2025 and to be completed in 2032.

== Station layout ==
3F
3F	Side platform, doors will open on the right
3F	Platform 1	← Wenhu line toward Taipei Nangang Exhibition Center (BR23 Nangang Software Park)
3F	Platform 2	→ Wenhu line toward Taipei Zoo (BR21 Huzhou)→
3F	Side platform, doors will open on the right

2F
2F	Lobby; Concourse	Main lobby, information desk, automatic ticket dispensing machines, one-way faregates, restrooms

1F
1F	Street level	Entrance/exit

== Around the station ==
- Ankang Park
- Nanhu Senior High School
- Minghu Junior High School
- Nanhu Elementary School
- Minghu Elementary School
- Donghu Elementary School
- Taipei Public Library, Donghu Branch
- Donghu Police Station
- Donghu Fire Department
- Halar Cinemas
