= Nangang Church =

Christian church located in Zhejiang Province, China

Nangang Church, also called the South Port Church, was a Christian church located in Wenzhou City in China. It was a church in China until the government of Ruian County government in Zhejiang Province demolished the church on the evening of January 11, 2023, when large cranes toppled the building and reduced it to rubble. The demolition had been ordered without an agreed compensation plan. The church covered 8 acres of originally coastal land and was valued at over $1.2 million US dollars. That night police beat, harassed, and arrested Christians in the area. Chinese Communist officials tore down the church to use the site for commercial buildings.

Wenzhou in Zhejiang is one of China's cities with the highest concentrations of Christians. This is a different church than Harbin Nangang Christian Church in Harbin, Heilongjiang Province, China.
