= Nangang Software Park metro station =

Metro station in Taipei, Taiwan

Nangang Software Park 南港軟體園區
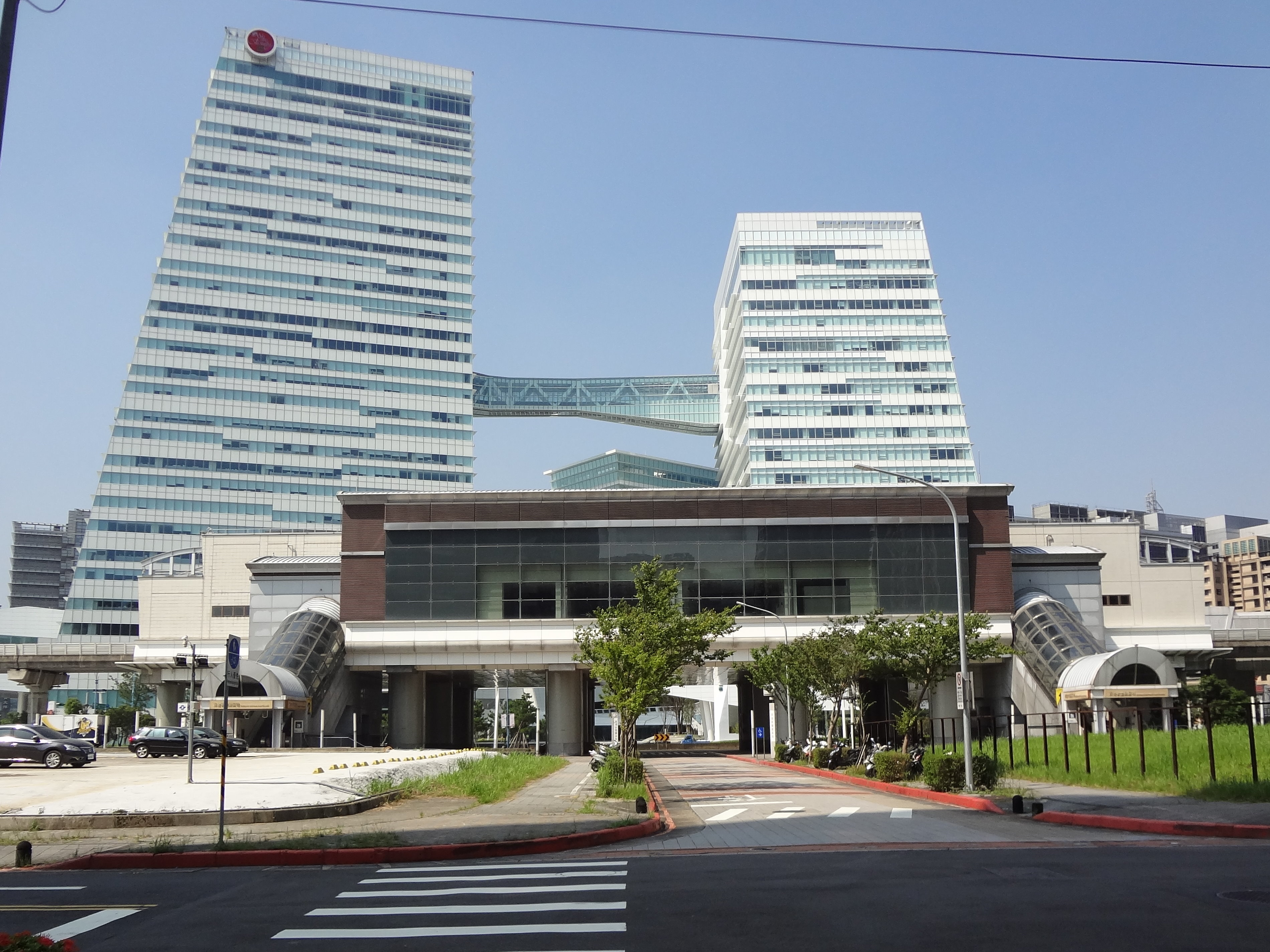

Chinese name
- Traditional Chinese: 南港軟體園區
- Simplified Chinese: 南港软体园区
Transcriptions
Standard Mandarin
- Hanyu Pinyin: Nángǎng Ruǎntǐ Yuánqū
- Bopomofo: ㄋㄢˊ ㄍㄤˇ ㄖㄨㄢˇ ㄊㄧˇ ㄩㄢˊ ㄑㄩ
Hakka
- Pha̍k-fa-sṳ: Nàm-kóng Ngiôn-thí Yèn-khî
Southern Min
- Tâi-lô: Lâm-káng Nńg-thé Hn̂g-khu

General information
- Location: No. 183, Jingmao 2nd Rd. Nangang, Taipei; Taiwan
- Coordinates: 25.059934°N 121.615874°E
- Operator: Taipei Metro
- Line: Wenhu line
- Connections: Bus stop

Construction
- Structure type: Elevated

Other information
- Station code: BR23

History
- Opened: 4 July 2009

Passengers
- daily (December 2024)
- Rank: 102 out of 109

Services
Preceding station	Taipei Metro	Following station
Donghu towards Taipei Zoo	Wenhu line	Nangang Exhib Center Terminus
Location

The Taipei Metro Nangang Software Park station is located in the Nangang District in Taipei, Taiwan. It is a station on the Brown Line.

== Station overview ==
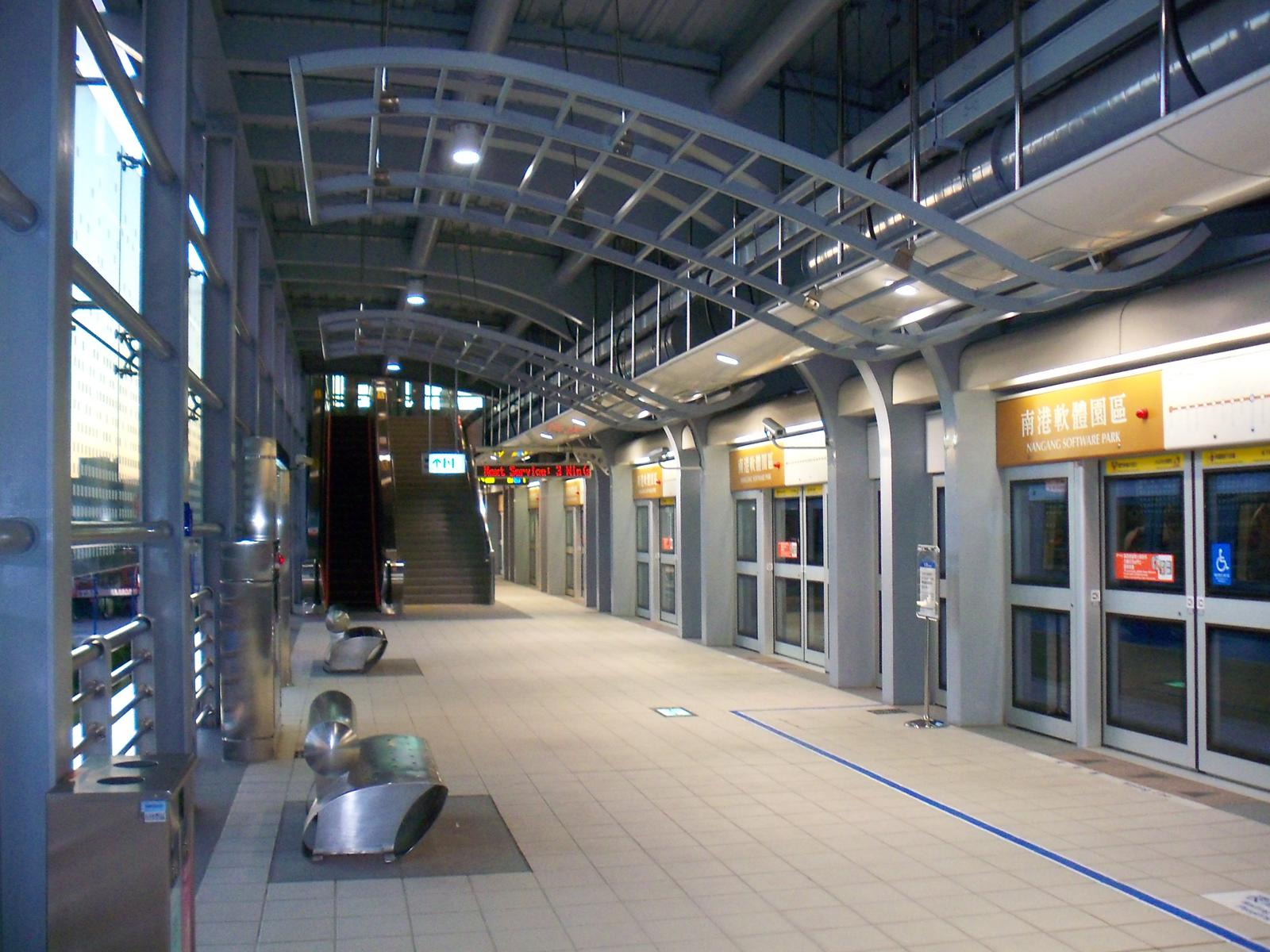
Nangang Software Park station platform

This two-level, elevated station features two side platforms, two exits, and a platform elevator located on the north side of the concourse level. The station is 93 meters long and 53 meters wide, while the platform is 93 meters long and 21.5 meters wide.

As part of the public art project for Brown Line, the theme for this station is "Digital".

== History ==
Construction of the Nangang Software Park station began on 16 June 2003 and was completed on 22 February 2009, before full opening on 4 July 2009. This station is named after the Nangang Software Park in its vicinity.

== Station layout ==
3F	Connecting level	Overhead bridge, machinery
2F
2F	Side platform, doors will open on the right
2F	Platform 1	← Wenhu line toward Taipei Nangang Exhibition Center (BR24 terminus)
2F	Platform 2	→ Wenhu line toward Taipei Zoo (BR22 Donghu) →
2F	Side platform, doors will open on the right
2F	Lobby （to Platform 2）
2F	Lobby （to Platform 2）	Lobby, information desk, automatic ticket dispensing machines One-way faregates, restrooms

1F	Street level	Entrance/exit
