= Neihu, Lufeng, Guangdong =

Coordinates: 22.97483°N 115.83449°E

Neihu 内湖镇
- Subdistrict

Chinese transcription(s)
- Interactive map of Neihu
- Country: China
- Province: Guangdong
- Prefecture: Shanwei
- County-level city: Lufeng
- Time zone: UTC+8 (China Standard Time)

Neihu (Chinese: 内湖; pinyin: Nèihú) is a township-level division situated in Lufeng, Shanwei, Guangdong, China.

== See also ==
- List of township-level divisions of Guangdong
