= Neihu metro station =

Metro station in Taipei, Taiwan

Neihu 內湖
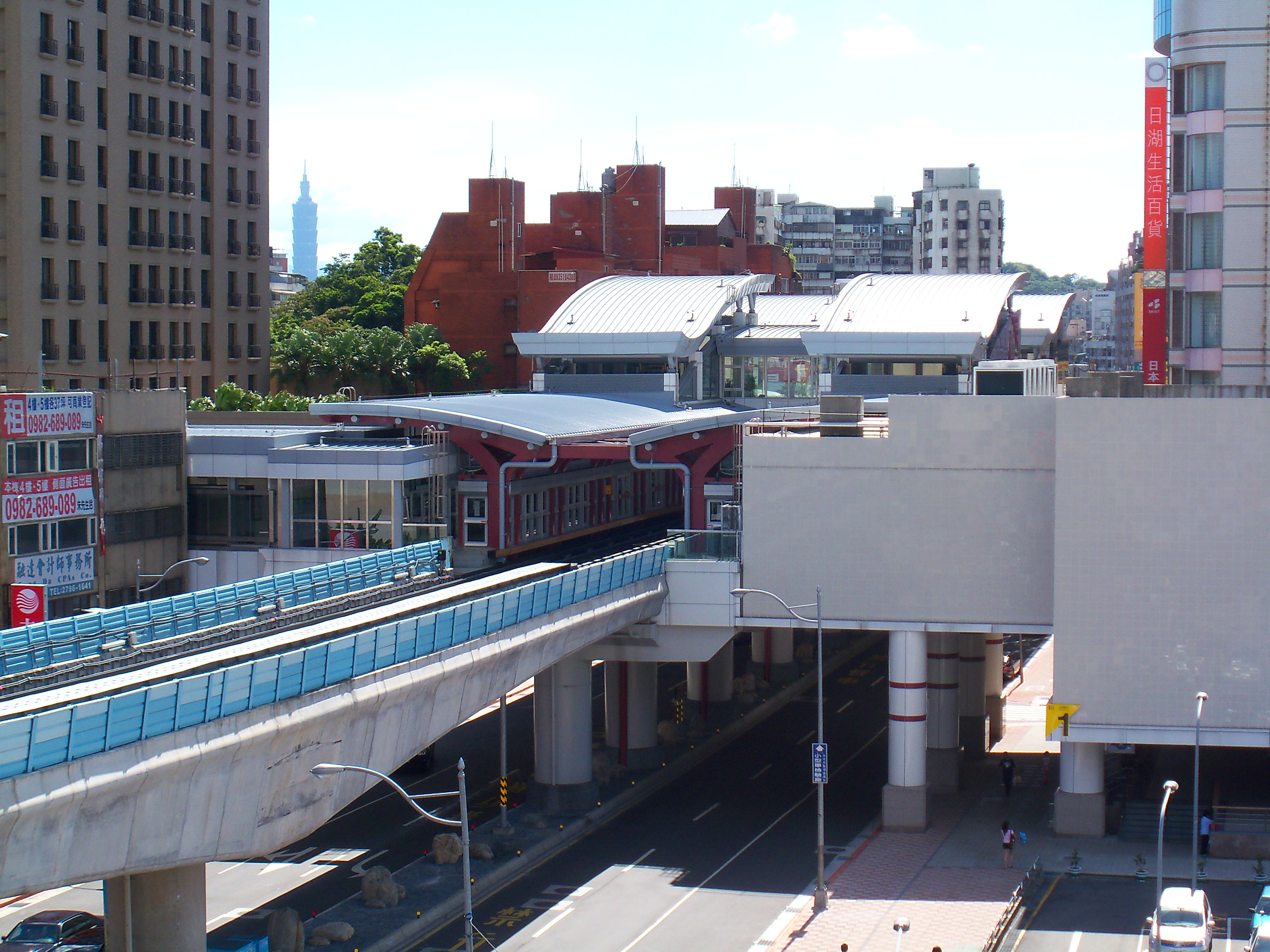
- Neihu station

Chinese name
- Traditional Chinese: 內湖
- Simplified Chinese: 内湖
- Literal meaning: Inner lake
Transcriptions
Standard Mandarin
- Hanyu Pinyin: Neìhú
- Bopomofo: ㄋㄟˋ ㄏㄨˊ
- Wade–Giles: Nei⁴-hu²
Hakka
- Pha̍k-fa-sṳ: Nui-fù
Southern Min
- Hokkien POJ: Lāi-ô͘
- Tâi-lô: Lāi-ôo

General information
- Location: No. 186, Sec. 4, Chenggong Rd. Neihu, Taipei; Taiwan
- Coordinates: 25.083772°N 121.594644°E
- Operator: Taipei Metro
- Line: Wenhu line
- Connections: Bus stop

Construction
- Structure type: Elevated

Other information
- Station code: BR19

History
- Opened: 4 July 2009

Passengers
- daily (December 2024)
- Rank: 87 out of 109

Services
Preceding station	Taipei Metro	Following station
Wende towards Taipei Zoo	Wenhu line	Dahu Park towards Nangang Exhib Center
Location

The Taipei Metro Neihu station (Chinese: 內湖站; pinyin: Neìhú Zhàn; Pe̍h-ōe-jī: Lāi-ô͘ Chām) is located in the Neihu District in Taipei, Taiwan. It is a station on the Wenhu line.

== Station overview ==
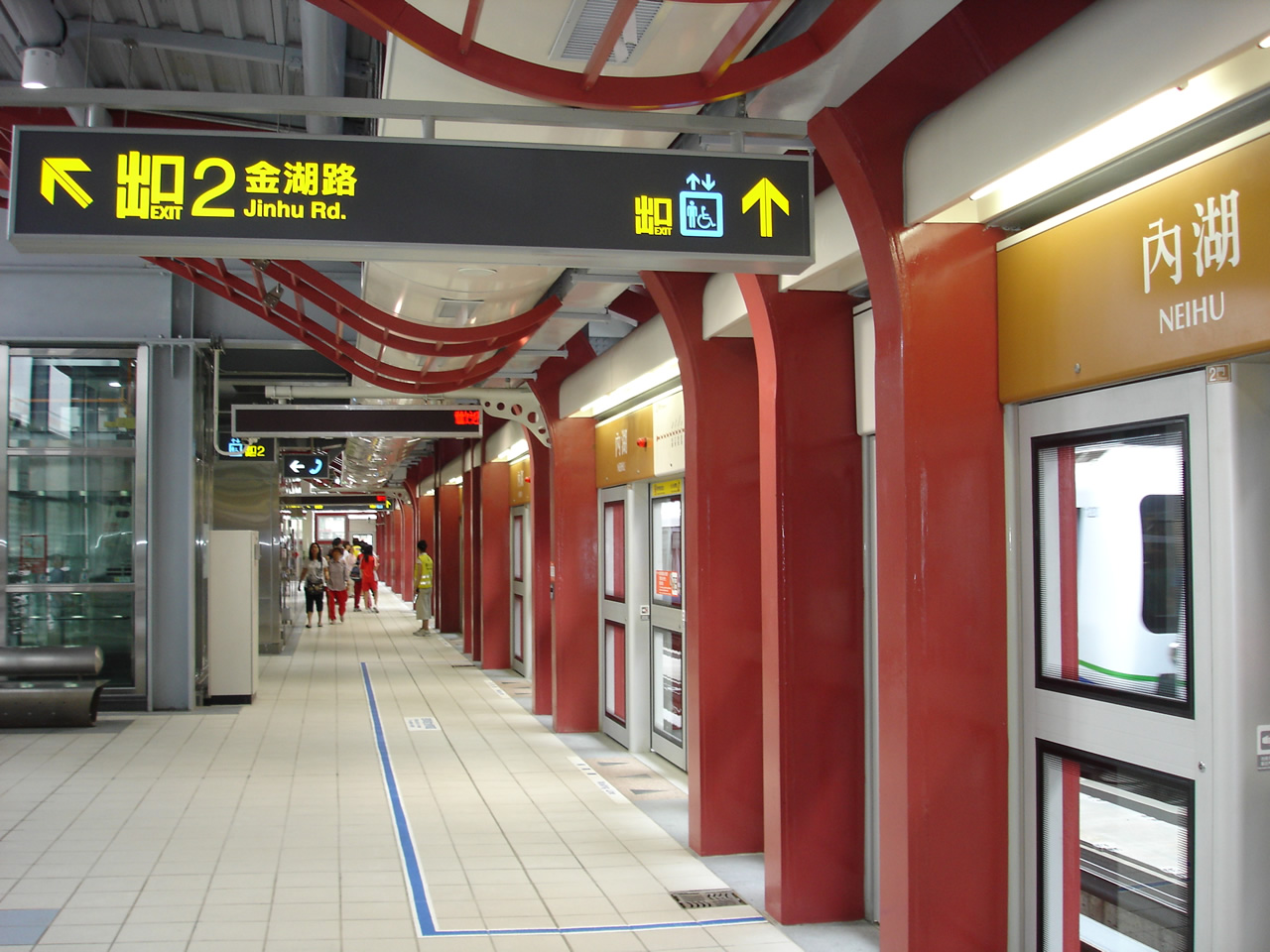
Neihu station platform

This two-level, elevated station features two side platforms, two exits, and platform elevators located on the north and south sides of the concourse level.

== History ==
- 22 February 2009: Neihu station construction is completed.
- 4 July 2009: Begins service with the opening of Brown line.

== Station layout ==
3F	Connecting level	Overhead bridge
2F
2F	South Concourse	Information desk, automatic ticket dispensing machine, one-way faregates Restrooms, escalators toward exit 2
2F	Side platform, doors will open on the right
2F	Platform 1	← Wenhu line toward Taipei Nangang Exhibition Center (BR20 Dahu Park)
2F	Platform 2	→ Wenhu line toward Taipei Zoo (BR18 Wende) →
2F	Side platform, doors will open on the right
2F	North Concourse	Information desk, automatic ticket dispensing machine, one-way faregates Restrooms, escalators toward exit 1

1F
1F	Street level	Entrance/exit

== Around the station ==
- American Institute in Taiwan
- Bihu Elementary School
- Bishanyan Temple
- Huguang Open-air Market
- Jinbi Temple
- Kangning Elementary School
- Lake Square
- Qingbai Park
