= Wenhu Line =

Taipei Metro route

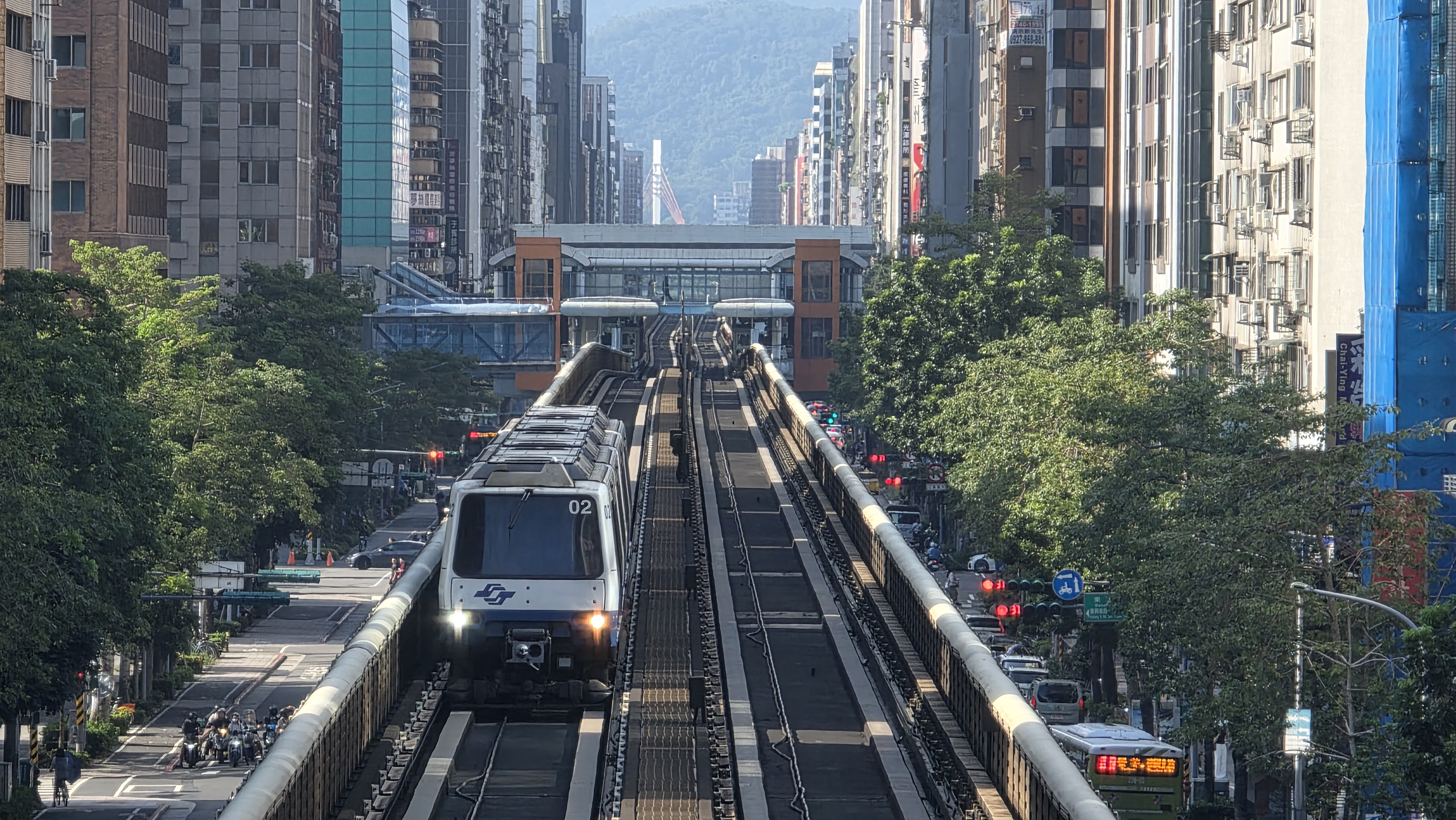
- VAL256 train between Daan and Zhongxiao Fuxing (shot on August 2, 2026)

Overview
- Other name: Brown Line
- Native name: 文湖線
- Status: In service
- Owner: Taipei DORTS
- Line number: BR
- Locale: Taipei, Taiwan
- Termini: Taipei Zoo; Taipei Nangang Exhibition Center
- Stations: 24
- Color on map: Brown

Service
- Type: Rubber-tyred light metro
- System: Taipei Metro
- Services: Taipei Zoo–Taipei Nangang Exhibition Center
- Operator: Taipei Rapid Transit Corporation
- Depots: Muzha; Neihu
- Rolling stock: VAL 256; Innovia APM 256

History
- Opened: 28 March 1996; 30 years ago
- Last extension: 2009

Technical
- Line length: 25.1 km (15.6 mi)
- Character: Elevated and underground (Note: Fuzhou Hill tunnel, Songshan Airport and Dazhi stations)
- Track gauge: 1,880 mm (6 ft 2 in) (Note: Uses a cement rail system that is different from the steel rail system's gauge definition.)
- Electrification: 750 V DC third rail
- Operating speed: 60 km/h (37 mph) to 70 km/h (43 mph)
- Signalling: Moving block Bombardier CITYFLO 650 CBTC–ATC under ATO GoA 4 (UTO)

Wenhu Line
- Traditional Chinese: 文湖線
- Simplified Chinese: 文湖线
Transcriptions
Standard Mandarin
- Hanyu Pinyin: Wénhú Xiàn
Hakka
- Pha̍k-fa-sṳ: Vùn-fù Sien
Southern Min
- Tâi-lô: Bûn-ôo-soàⁿ

Wenshan–Neihu Line
- Traditional Chinese: 文山內湖線
- Simplified Chinese: 文山内湖线
Transcriptions
Standard Mandarin
- Hanyu Pinyin: Wénshān–Nèihú Xiàn
Hakka
- Pha̍k-fa-sṳ: Vùn-sân–Nui-fù Sien
Southern Min
- Tâi-lô: Bûn-san-–Lāi-ôo-soàⁿ

Brown Line
- Traditional Chinese: 棕線
- Simplified Chinese: 棕线
Transcriptions
Standard Mandarin
- Hanyu Pinyin: Zōng Xiàn
- Wade–Giles: Tsung^{1} Hsien^{4}
- Tongyong Pinyin: Zong Siàn
Hakka
- Pha̍k-fa-sṳ: Chûng Sien
Southern Min
- Tâi-lô: Chang soàⁿ

The Wenhu Line (Chinese: 文湖線), also known as Brown Line (Chinese: 棕線), is a rubber-tyred light metro line in Taipei operated by Taipei Metro, named after the districts it connects: Wenshan and Neihu. It is an automated and is 25.1 kilometres (15.6 mi) long, serving a total of 24 stations located in 7 districts in Taipei, of which 22 are elevated and 2 underground. As of April 2022, the line transports an average of approximately 140,000 passengers daily.

The Wenshan section began revenue service on 28 March 1996, as the Muzha line. The Neihu section began revenue service on 4 July 2009. The Wenhu Line was then named the Muzha–Neihu Line, colloquially shortened as the Zhahu Line, until 8 October 2009, when it adopted the current name, short for Wenshan-Neihu Line. This was the first metro line constructed in Taipei.

== History ==
Construction of the Wenshan Line began in December 1988 at a cost of NT$42.6 billion. It was plagued by controversy, cost overruns and technical problems from its development up to a few years after its opening. Originally slated to commence passenger service in December 1991, its revenue operation was repeatedly delayed up to 28 March 1996 owing to numerous accidents. Public confidence was shaken as incidents of lightning strikes, computer failures, two instances of rolling stock derailment and catching fire each were reported during the testing phase. In 1999, cracks were found on the elevated pillars forcing the line to shut down temporarily.

One of the largest suppliers for the system, Matra, which supplied the VAL 256 rolling stock and electrical systems for the line sued the Department of Rapid Transit Systems of the Taipei City Government for costs overruns claiming to have resulted from the latter failing to provide the necessary infrastructure to build the line. Subsequently, the company pulled out of the operation of the line in 1994. Chen Shui Bian, then Mayor of Taipei declared that progress and operation of the line would continue despite the walkout in the now-popular catchphrase "馬特拉不拉，我們自己拉" (lit: If Matra doesn't pull, we'd pull it ourselves). After a 12-year-long legal tussle, in 2005, Matra was awarded NT$1.6 billion (approx. US$50 million) in damages by the Supreme Court of the Republic of China.

Services on the Wenshan Line began with two-car operation of the VAL 256 coupled together. Eventually, increasing patronage on the system led to operation in four-car configurations. The opening of Maokong Gondola in 2007 have also boosted passenger numbers travelling on the line to Taipei Zoo for transfer.

The Wenshan Line is connected to the Neihu Line, which opened in July 2009. It connects to Neihu and Taipei Songshan Airport, which currently has no rapid transit access. Since an alternative contractor Bombardier was awarded to supply the rolling stock and the signaling system for the new line, the Wenshan Line's signaling system was converted to suit the new communications-based train control (CBTC) CITYFLO 650 to allow both the old Matra rolling stock and the new Bombardier rolling stock to run in co-existence. On 19 December 2010, fifty-one pairs of retrofitted VAL 256's (from the Matra rolling stock) began testing on the entire line. After over half a year of testing, the additional trains would decrease the time between trains at rush hour from 2 minutes to 72 seconds and bring the total number of trains operating on the line to 152 pairs.

The long-awaited Neihu Line has had many delays prior to its opening. Since the Neihu Line was planned as an extension to the Wenshan Line, the original plan called for a similar elevated medium-capacity line. However, due to the growth of the Neihu District, many residents and politicians called for an underground, high-capacity line instead (similar to the Blue line).

The initial cost estimate of the elevated line was NT$42.6 billion, but due to delays the price-adjusted cost estimate rose to over NT$60.3 billion. A shift to underground construction would have increased the cost to as high as NT$134.4 billion. However, the Central Government stated that if construction for the Neihu Line did not start immediately, they would withhold the grant money for the line. In addition, due to the narrow streets and numerous turns in Neihu, construction of an underground high-capacity line would have been infeasible. Thus, the plan to build an elevated line continued after much delay.

There was also significant debate whether Songshan Airport should be included on the route. The addition of the station added an additional 1.9 kilometres (1.2 mi) to the line's length. Because of the inclusion of the station, the final cost of the line reached NT$66.7 billion.

The line was initially planned to begin service in 1996, and after 13 years of delay, the line finally began operations. However, the Neihu Line has been criticised for its frequent malfunctions and safety issues.

=== Important dates ===
- 23 February 1987: Initial planning of the Neihu Line started.
- 15 December 1988: Construction of the Wenshan Line begins. At this time, the Neihu Line is planned to open in 1996.
- 28 September 1993: Because of fires on the trains during trials of the Wenshan Line, all Neihu Line planning was halted.
- 9 October 1993: The Department of Rapid Transit Systems (DORTS) announced plans to change the Neihu Line to a high-capacity underground line.
- 23 August 1994: The DORTS announced plans to continue building the Neihu Line as a medium-capacity elevated line. Neihu residents protest the change.
- 26 September 2001: All 12 stations on the Neihu Line are finalised.
- 23 May 2002: Construction begins on the Neihu Line.
- 24 December 2007: The first trial run is conducted between Songshan Airport and Jiannan Road.
- 28 June 2008: Construction of the Neihu Line is completed.
- 4 July 2009: The Wenshan Line is converted to the new CITYFLO 650 system from the 13-year-old Matra fixed block system. Service on the Neihu Line begins.
- 10 July 2009: Because of system problems, service on the Brown Line was halted at 15:30 until 18:30 the next day.
- 19 December 2010: Retrofitted VAL 256 cars begin testing on the Brown Line. It was expected to decrease waits between trains and increase line capacity.

== Rolling stock ==
The line was operated by the two-car driverless VAL 256 built in 1993. A total of 102 cars were built with a maximum capacity of 114 passengers each. The fleet ran on rubber-tyred track at a maximum speed of 80 kilometres per hour (50 mph).

With the opening of the Neihu Line, the entire line switched over to the new automatic train control CITYFLO 650 using INNOVIA APM 256 trains (produced by Bombardier, internally code-named C370 by the TRTC). As of 19 December 2010, trials are being run on retrofitted VAL 256 trains modified to run on both the Muzha and Neihu Lines. The trains are expected to fully enter revenue service after testing by 26 December 2010. On 26 December 2010, the line would operate with 6 pairs of the retrofitted VAL 256's and 25-29 pairs of the C370's. By 27 December, the ratio increased with 10 pairs of VAL 256's and 40 pairs of the C370's.

The Wenhu Line is now the only line worldwide to use the VAL 256; the O'Hare International Airport's Airport Transit System phased theirs out in 2019.

== Stations ==
List of Wenhu Line stations
Code	Station name	Station type		Locale		Sta. distance (km)		Opened date	Transfer
Code	Station name	Structure	Platform	Locale		Previous	Total	Opened date	Transfer
Wenhu Line
BR01	Taipei Zoo 動物園	Elevated	Side	Wenshan	Taipei	—N/a	0.00	1996-3-28	Circular Line; Shenkeng LRT; Maokong Gondola
BR02	Muzha 木柵	Elevated	Side	Wenshan	Taipei	0.68	0.68	1996-3-28	—N/a
BR03	Wanfang Community 萬芳社區	Elevated	Side	Wenshan	Taipei	0.51	1.19	1996-3-28	—N/a
BR04	Wanfang Hospital 萬芳醫院	Elevated	Side	Wenshan	Taipei	1.14	2.33	1996-3-28	—N/a
BR05	Xinhai 辛亥	Elevated	Side	Wenshan	Taipei	0.76	3.09	1996-3-28	—N/a
BR06	Linguang 麟光	Elevated	Side	Daan	Taipei	1.60	4.69	1996-3-28	—N/a
BR07	Liuzhangli 六張犁	Elevated	Side	Daan	Taipei	0.82	5.51	1996-3-28	—N/a
BR08	Technology Building 科技大樓	Elevated	Side	Daan	Taipei	1.14	6.65	1996-3-28	—N/a
BR09	Daan 大安	Elevated	Side	Daan	Taipei	0.75	7.40	1996-3-28	Tamsui–Xinyi Line
BR10	Zhongxiao Fuxing 忠孝復興	Elevated	Side	Daan	Taipei	0.89	8.29	1996-3-28	Bannan Line
BR11	Nanjing Fuxing 南京復興	Elevated	Side	Songshan	Taipei	1.27	9.56	1996-3-28	Songshan–Xindian Line
BR12	Zhongshan Junior High School 中山國中	Elevated	Side	Zhongshan	Taipei	0.93	10.49	1996-3-28	Minsheng–Xizhi Line (SB04)
BR13	Songshan Airport 松山機場	Underground	Island	Songshan	Taipei	1.48	11.97	2009-7-4	—N/a
BR14	Dazhi 大直	Underground	Island	Zhongshan	Taipei	2.59	14.56	2009-7-4	—N/a
BR15	Jiannan Road 劍南路	Elevated	Side	Zhongshan	Taipei	1.33	15.89	2009-7-4	Circular Line
BR16	Xihu 西湖	Elevated	Island	Neihu	Taipei	1.28	17.17	2009-7-4	—N/a
BR17	Gangqian 港墘	Elevated	Side	Neihu	Taipei	0.83	18.00	2009-7-4	—N/a
BR18	Wende 文德	Elevated	Side	Neihu	Taipei	1.01	19.01	2009-7-4	—N/a
BR19	Neihu 內湖	Elevated	Side	Neihu	Taipei	1.13	20.14	2009-7-4	—N/a
BR20	Dahu Park 大湖公園	Elevated	Side	Neihu	Taipei	0.87	21.01	2009-7-4	—N/a
BR21	Huzhou 葫洲	Elevated	Side	Neihu	Taipei	1.63	22.64	2009-7-4	—N/a
BR22	Donghu 東湖	Elevated	Side	Neihu	Taipei	0.85	23.49	2009-7-4	Minsheng–Xizhi Line
BR23	Nangang Software Park 南港軟體園區	Elevated	Side	Nangang	Taipei	1.01	24.53	2009-7-4	—N/a
BR24	Taipei Nangang Exhibition Center 南港展覽館	Elevated	Island	Nangang	Taipei	0.65	25.18	2009-7-4	Bannan Line; Keelung MRT
