= Huzhou metro station =

Metro station in Taipei, Taiwan

Huzhou 葫洲
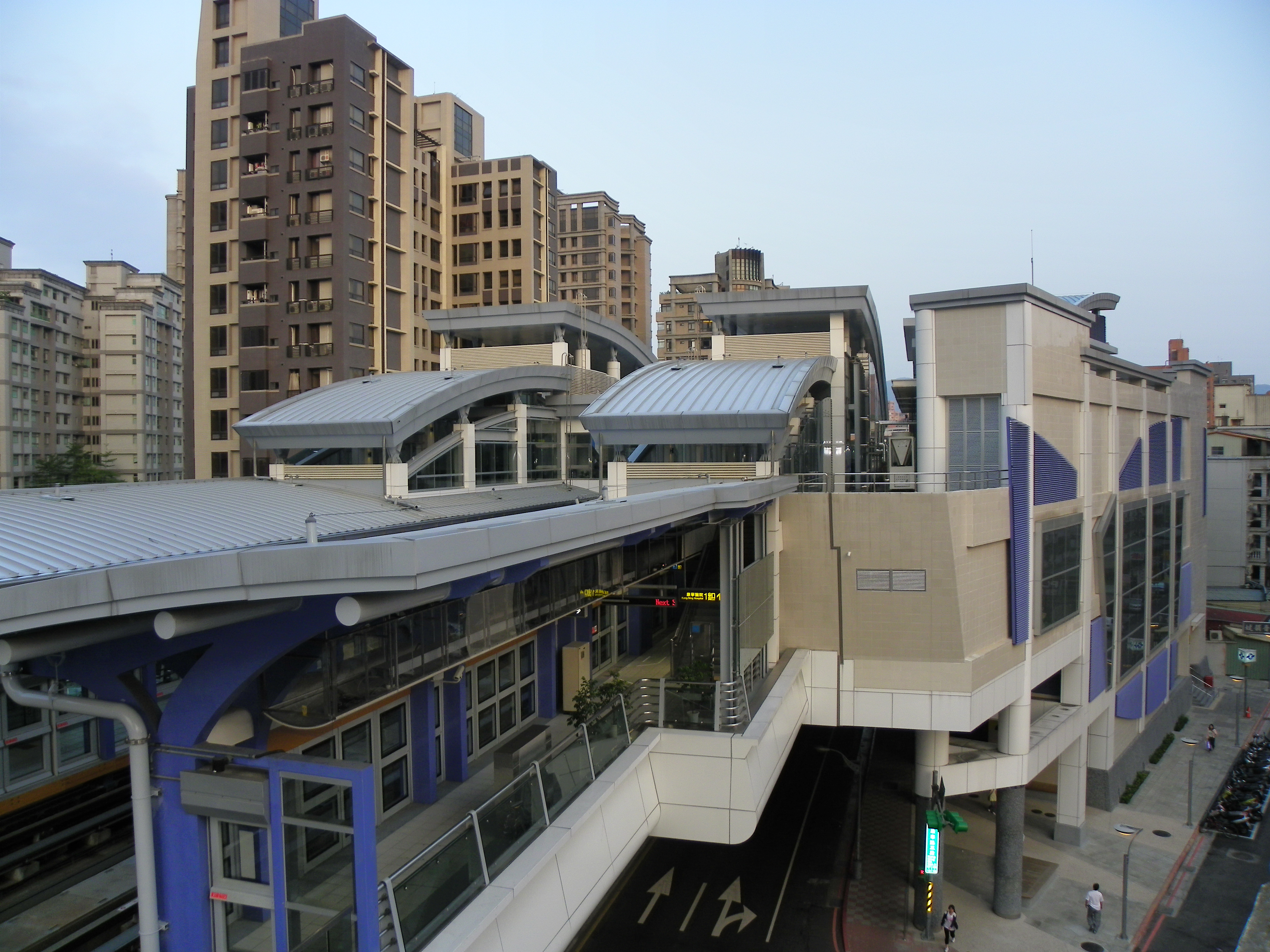
- Huzhou station

Chinese name
- Chinese: 葫洲
Transcriptions
Standard Mandarin
- Hanyu Pinyin: Húzhōu
- Bopomofo: ㄏㄨˊ ㄓㄡ
- Wade–Giles: Hu²-chou¹
Hakka
- Pha̍k-fa-sṳ: Fù-chû
Southern Min
- Tâi-lô: Ôo-tsiu

General information
- Location: No. 16, Sec. 3, Kangning Rd. Neihu, Taipei; Taiwan
- Coordinates: 25.072816°N 121.607374°E
- Operator: Taipei Metro
- Line: Wenhu line
- Connections: Bus stop

Construction
- Structure type: Elevated

Other information
- Station code: BR21

History
- Opened: 4 July 2009

Passengers
- daily (December 2024)
- Rank: 90 out of 109

Services
| Preceding station | Taipei Metro | Following station |
|---|---|---|
| Dahu Park towards Taipei Zoo | Wenhu line | Donghu towards Nangang Exhib Center |
Location

The Taipei Metro Huzhou station is located in the Neihu District in Taipei, Taiwan. It is a station on Wenhu line.

== Station overview ==
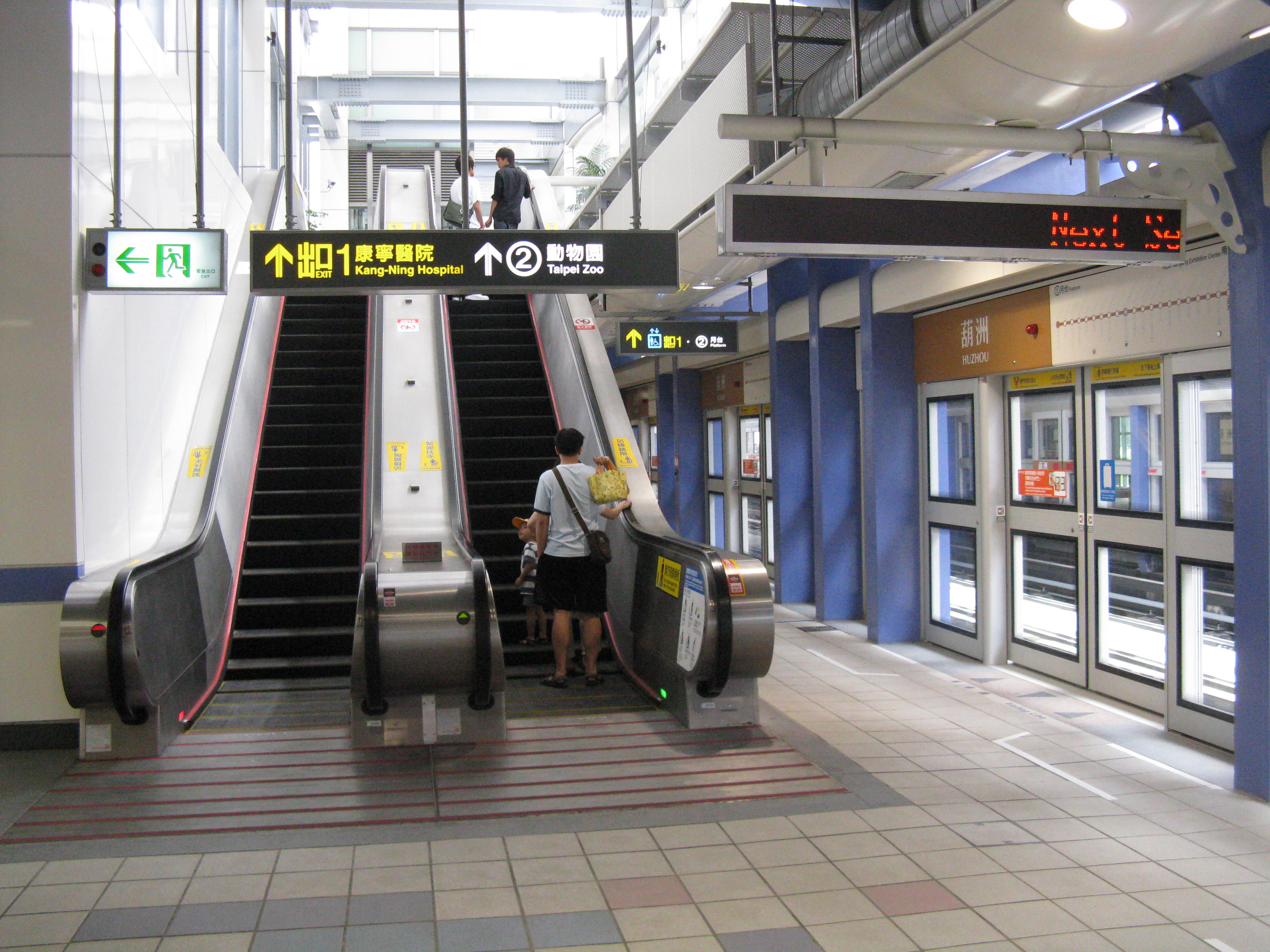
Huzhou station platform 1

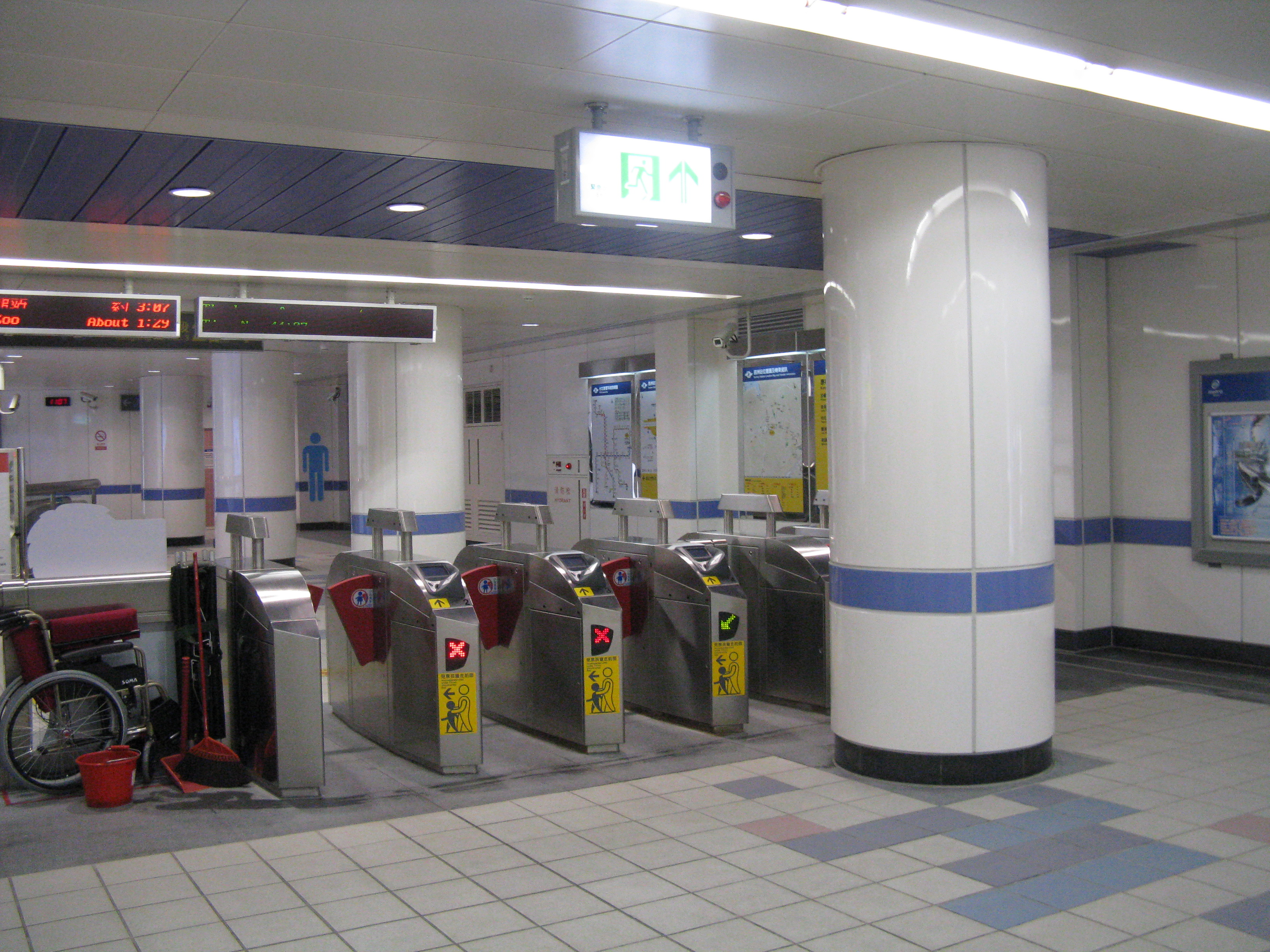
Huzhou station faregates

This three-level, elevated station features two side platforms, two exits, and platform elevators located on the east and west sides of the concourse level.

The station is located at the intersection of Chenggong Road, Sec. 5 and Kangning Road, Sec. 3. It is 83 meters long and 21.5 meters wide, while the platform is 93.5 meters long.

The area around the station has many high-rise residential buildings and television stations. Because of its proximity to residential buildings along the Brown line, it is the only station to have 3.6 meter double-curved walls to reduce noise levels. The station is also designed to fit in with the casual environment of local businesses.

=== Design ===
The theme for this station is "Dancing", with decorative art walls in the station.

== History ==
- 22 February 2009: Huzhou station construction is completed.
- 4 July 2009: Begins service with the opening of the Brown line.

== Station layout ==
| 4F | Connecting level | Overhead bridge |
3F
| 3F | South Concourse | Information desk, automatic ticket dispensing machine, one-way faregates Restrooms, escalators toward exit 2 |
| 3F | Side platform, doors will open on the right |
| 3F | Platform 1 | ← Wenhu line toward Taipei Nangang Exhibition Center (BR22 Donghu) |
| 3F | Platform 2 | → Wenhu line toward Taipei Zoo (BR20 Dahu Park) → |
| 3F | Side platform, doors will open on the right |
| 3F | North Concourse | Information desk, automatic ticket dispensing machine, one-way faregates restrooms, escalators toward exit 1 |

2F
| 2F | Middle level | Stairs, escalators for changing platforms |

1F
| 1F | Street level | Entrance/exit |

== Nearby places ==
- Kang-Ning Jr. College of Medical Care and Management
- Kanghu Park
- PTS Foundation Building
- Hakka TV
- Taiwan Indigenous Television
- Minghu Junior High School
- Minhu Elementary School
- Lihu Elementary School
- Kang-Ning General Hospital
- Financial Information Service Co., Ltd.
- City Lake Hotel
