= Neihu District =

District in Taipei, Taiwan

Coordinates: 25°04′N 121°35′E

Neihu 內湖區
- District
- Neihu District
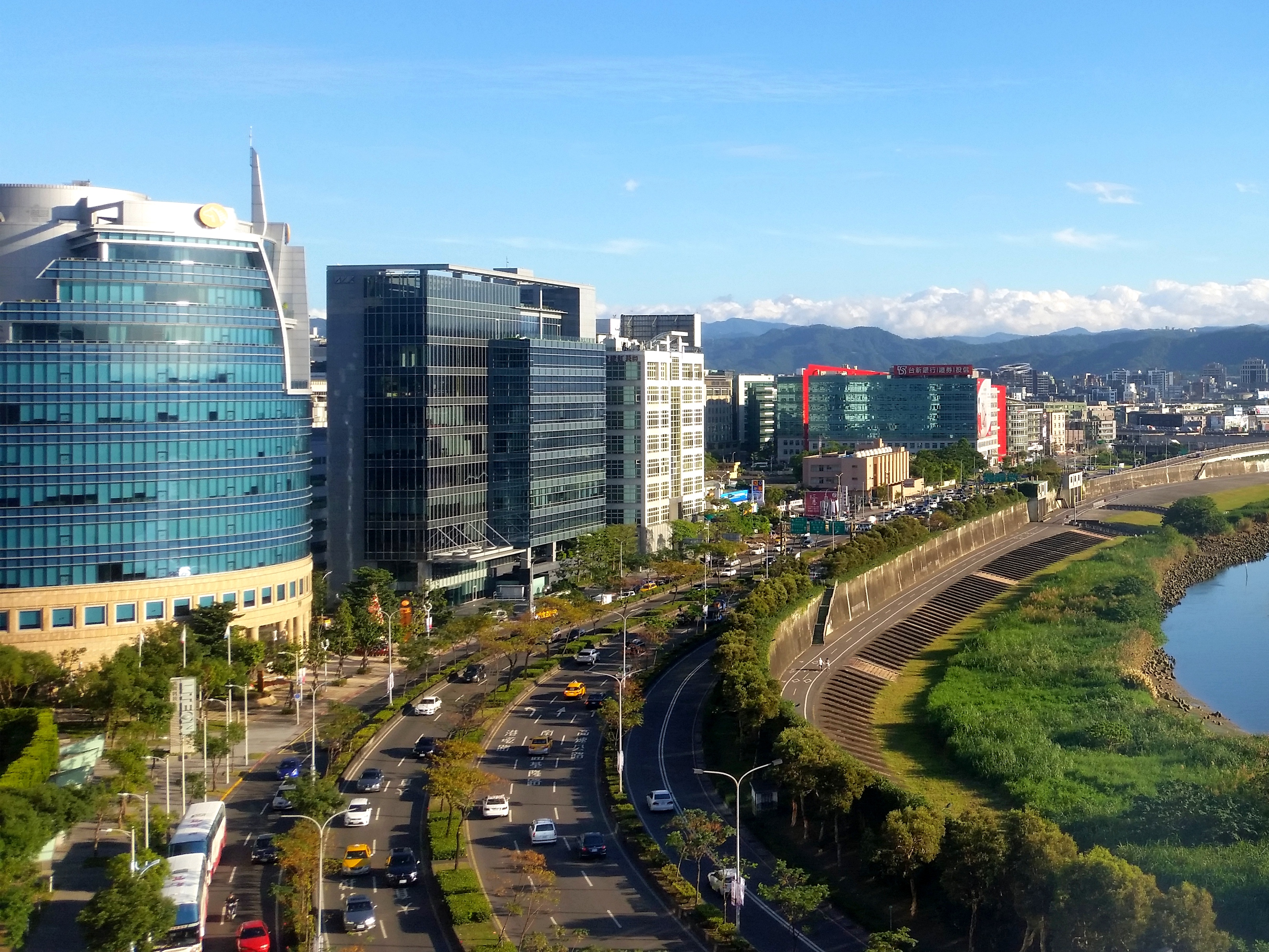
- Tiding Boulevard in Neihu

- Country: Republic of China (Taiwan)
- Region: Eastern Taipei City
- Divisions: List: 37 villages; 905 neighborhoods

Area
  - Total: 31.5787 km^{2} (12.1926 sq mi)
  - Rank: Ranked 3rd of 12

Population (March 2023)
  - Total: 274,538
  - Rank: Ranked 3rd of 12
  - Density: 8,693.77/km^{2} (22,516.8/sq mi)
- Postal code: 114
- Website: nhdo.gov.taipei (in Chinese)

Neihu District
- Traditional Chinese: 內湖區
Transcriptions
Standard Mandarin
- Hanyu Pinyin: Nèihú Qū
- Wade–Giles: Nei⁴-hu² Ch'ü¹
- Tongyong Pinyin: Nèihú Cyu
Hakka
- Romanization: Nui-fù-khî
Southern Min
- Hokkien POJ: Lāi-ô͘-khu

Neihu District is a district of Taipei City, Taiwan. Neihu means "inner lake." The older name originates from the Ketagalan word Tayour (transliterated by the Dutch as Cattajo), meaning woman's head ornament.

Many mountainous roads and paths, which are ideal for hiking, connect Neihu with the neighboring Shilin District and Yangmingshan National Park. The Tri-Service General Hospital, which is a teaching hospital of the National Defense Medical Center, is also in Neihu. The Wuchih Mountain Military Cemetery borders Neihu.

== History ==
During Japanese rule, Naiko Village (內湖莊) covered modern day Neihu in addition to Nangang. The village was under Shichisei District, Taihoku Prefecture.

== Economy ==
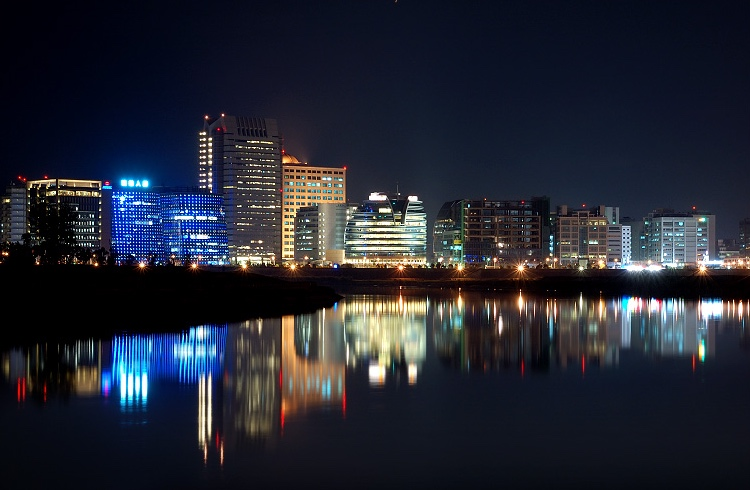
Taipei Neihu Technology Park

Although it was a flood-prone region, Neihu has experienced huge growth with the construction of the Neihu Technology Park in 1995 and hypermarkets such as Costco, RT Mart, Carrefour, B&Q. The extension of the Taipei Metro to Neihu in the 1990s and early 2000s has also boosted residential and commercial growth. TransAsia Airways, Delta Electronics and RT-Mart have their headquarters in the district. Neihu is the location of the Garena e-Sports Stadium, which is host to the League of Legends Masters Series, the premier League of Legends esports professional video game league in Taiwan, Hong Kong, and Macau.

== Topography ==
Straightening of the Keelung River, which runs along Neihu's southern and eastern borders has changed the natural boundaries of the district at several points in the latter 20th century.

== Institutions ==
- American Institute in Taiwan

== Education ==
=== Universities and colleges ===
- National Taiwan College of Performing Arts
- Takming University of Science and Technology
- University of Kang Ning

=== High schools ===
- Taipei Municipal Nei-Hu Vocational High School (1986)
- Taipei Municipal Neihu Senior High School (1988)
- Taipei Municipal Lishan Senior High School (2000)
- St. Francis High School

== Infrastructure ==
- Neihu Refuse Incineration Plant
- Taipei Public Library Neihu Branch
- Taipei Public Library Donghu Branch
- Taipei Public Library Xihu Branch

== Industry ==
- Neihu Technology Park
- Neihu Flower Market

== Tourist attractions ==
Neihu's attractions include Dahu Park, famous for its picturesque footbridge, Bihu Park, where cherry blossoms can be viewed in the spring, and Bishan Temple (碧山巖), a large Taoist temple dedicated to Chen Yuanguang (陳元光) or Kai Zhang Sheng Wang (開漳聖王) on the mountainside that affords a panoramic view of Taipei. In the vicinity of Bishan Temple are a number of other Taoist and Buddhist temples, as well as orchards and fruit farms where tourists can pick their own fruit. An extensive network of hiking trails criss-crosses the mountainous regions of the northern part of Neihu. Another tourist attraction is Guo Ziyi Memorial Hall.

== Transportation ==
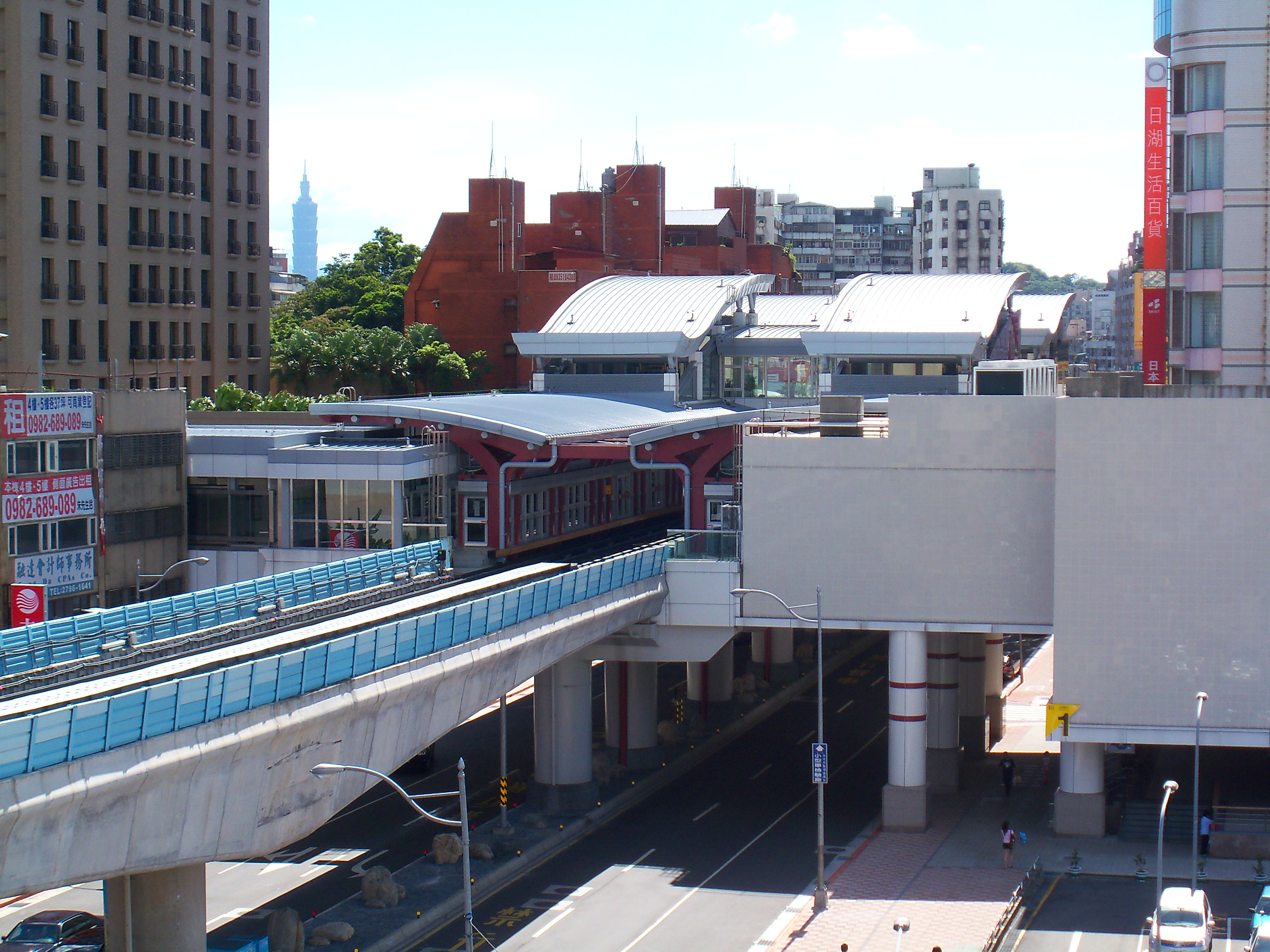
Neihu Station

The district is served by the Wenhu line of Taipei Metro. Stations located within the district are Donghu metro station, Huzhou metro station, Dahu Park metro station, Neihu metro station, Wende metro station, Gangqian metro station and Xihu metro station.

The Circular line will service Neihu in the future.

== See also ==
- District (Taiwan)
