= Swartz (surname) =

Swartz is a surname of German and Ashkenazic Jewish origin, related to the German(-Dutch)/ word schwarz, which means the colour "black". It may refer to:

- Aaron Swartz (1986–2013), American computer programmer and activist
- Aaron Swartz (actor), English actor and director
- Arthur L. Swartz (1888–1940), American politician from New York
- Beth Ames Swartz (born 1936), American artist
- Bud Swartz (1929–1991), American baseball pitcher
- Carl Swartz (1858–1926), Swedish politician
- Carl Swartz (1920–2008), Swedish diplomat
- Charles Swartz (disambiguation), various people
- Christian Swartz (1846–1932), American politician
- Clarence Lee Swartz (1868–1936), American individualist anarchist
- Clementine Swartz (1835–1923), Swedish stage actress
- Dan Swartz (1931–1997), American basketball player
- David Heywood Swartz (1942–2026), American diplomat
- Edvard Swartz (1826–1897), Swedish actor
- Elsa Swartz (1874–1948), American composer
- Eva Swartz (1956–2024), Swedish businesswoman
- Fabian Ax Swartz (born 2004), Swedish alpine ski racer
- George Swartz (1928–2006), South African bishop
- Harry Swartz (born 1996), American soccer player
- Harvie S (born 1948), stage name of American jazz double-bassist Harvie Swartz
- Jack Swartz (1930–1997), American football coach and athletics administrator
- Jan Swartz, American businesswoman
- Jeffrey Swartz (born 1960), American businessman, former CEO of Timberland
- Jerome Swartz (born 1940), American physicist
- John Swartz (1858–1937), American photographer
- Joshua William Swartz (1867–1959), American politician
- Julianne Swartz, American artist
- Kit Swartz, American television news producer
- Marc Swartz (1931–2011), American political and cultural anthropologist
- Maud O'Farrell Swartz (1879–1937), American labor leader
- Melody Swartz (born 1969), American biomedical engineer and academic
- Merlin Swartz (1933–2022), American Islamic studies professor
- Monroe Swartz (1897–1980), American baseball pitcher
- Monty Swartz (1897–1980), American baseball pitcher
- Nathan Swartz (1902–1984), Ukrainian-born American shoemaker and businessman
- Nelle Swartz (1881–1952), American labor official, social worker
- Norman Swartz (born 1939), American academic and philosopher
- Olof Swartz (1760–1818), Swedish biologist
- Oscar Swartz (born 1959), Swedish entrepreneur, writer and blogger
- Oswald Swartz (born 1953), South African bishop
- Reginald Swartz (1911–2006), Australian politician
- Robert Swartz, Canadian film and television editor
- Roberta Teale Swartz (1903–1993), American academic and poet
- Ross Swartz, American baseball player and sports coach
- Samuel Jackson Swartz (1859–1905), American politician
- Shane Swartz (born 1975), American boxer
- Sophia Swartz, Namibian politician
- Stanley L. Swartz, American academic
- Susan Swartz, American visual artist, environmental and health activist, and documentary film producer
- Tenille Swartz (born 1987), South African squash player
- Tony Swartz (1943–2016), American actor
- Trevor Swartz (born 1996), American soccer coach
- Zandrè Swartz (born 1991), South African cricketer

== See also ==
- Schwarz (surname)
