= IFG Farglory Square =

Shopping mall in Xizhi, New Taipei, Taiwan

iFG Farglory Square
- iFG遠雄廣場

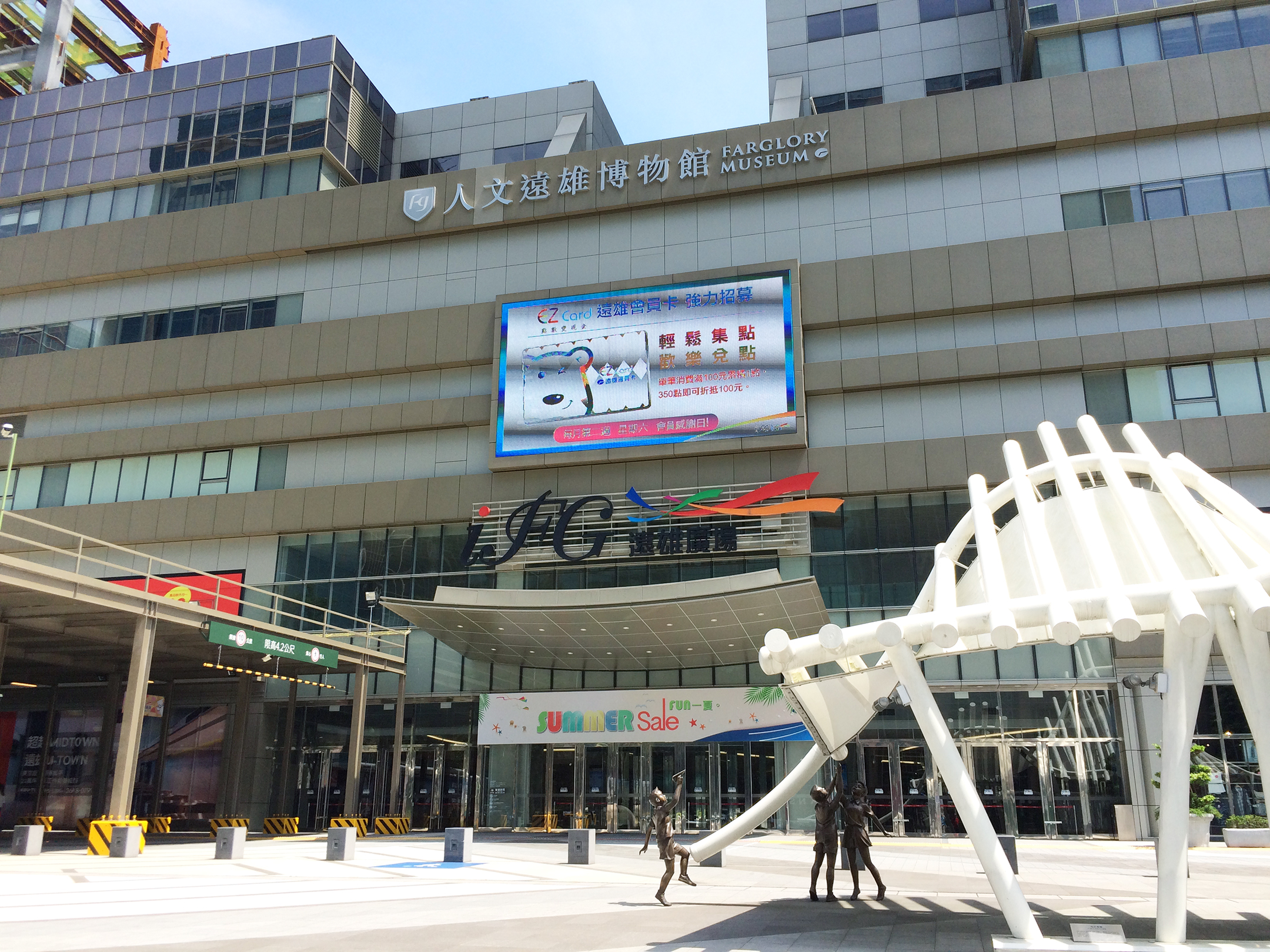
- Location: No. 93 - 99, Section 1, Xintaiwu Road, Xizhi District, New Taipei, Taiwan
- Coordinates: 25.062043421116464°N 121.64792361713275°E
- Opened: 23 October 2015
- Owner: Farglory Group
- Num. of stores: 200
- Floor area: 104,181 m^{2} (1,121,390 sq ft)
- Floors: 3 floors above ground 1 floor below ground
- Parking: 1370
- Public transit: Xike railway station
- Website: http://ifgmall.fg-retail.com.tw/index.php

iFG Farglory Square (Chinese: iFG遠雄廣場) is a shopping center in Xizhi District, New Taipei, Taiwan that opened on 23 October 2015. Owned and operated by the Farglory Group, it is the first and largest shopping mall in the district. It occupies levels B1 to 3 of the skyscraper complex Farglory U-Town. With a total floor area of 104,181 m^{2} (1,121,390 sq ft), the main core stores of the mall include Carrefour Xike store, Nitori, Muji, Timberland as well as various themed restaurants and a food court on level B1.

== Location ==
The location of the mall is opposite to the Oriental Science Park and in close proximity to the Xike railway station.

== Floor Guide ==
Level 3	iFG Furniture Design Center
Level 2	Denim, Leisure, Nitori
Level 1	Men and Women's Fashion, Cosmetics, Undergarments, Outdoor
B1	Food Court, Supermarket

== Gallery ==
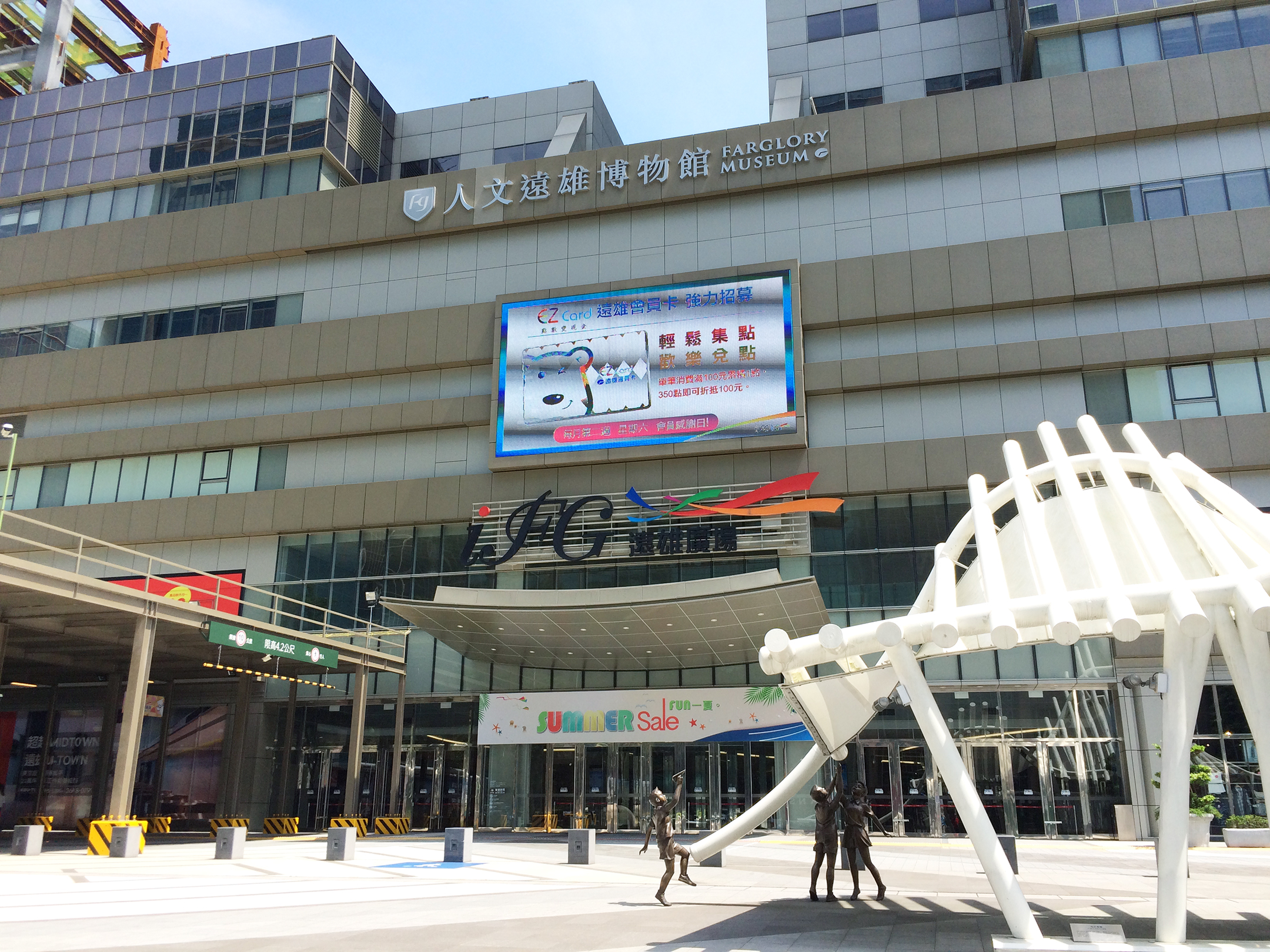
Entrance

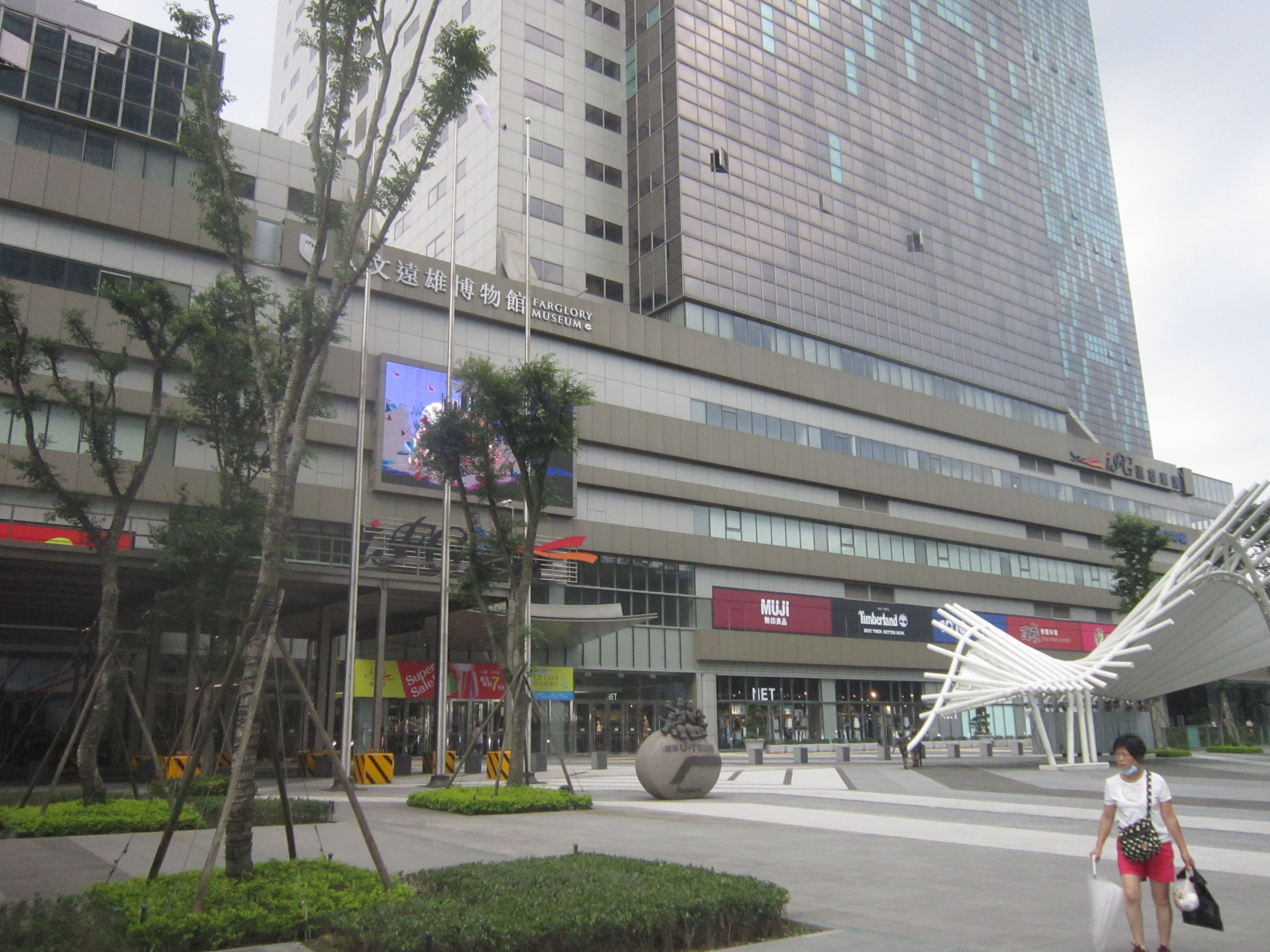

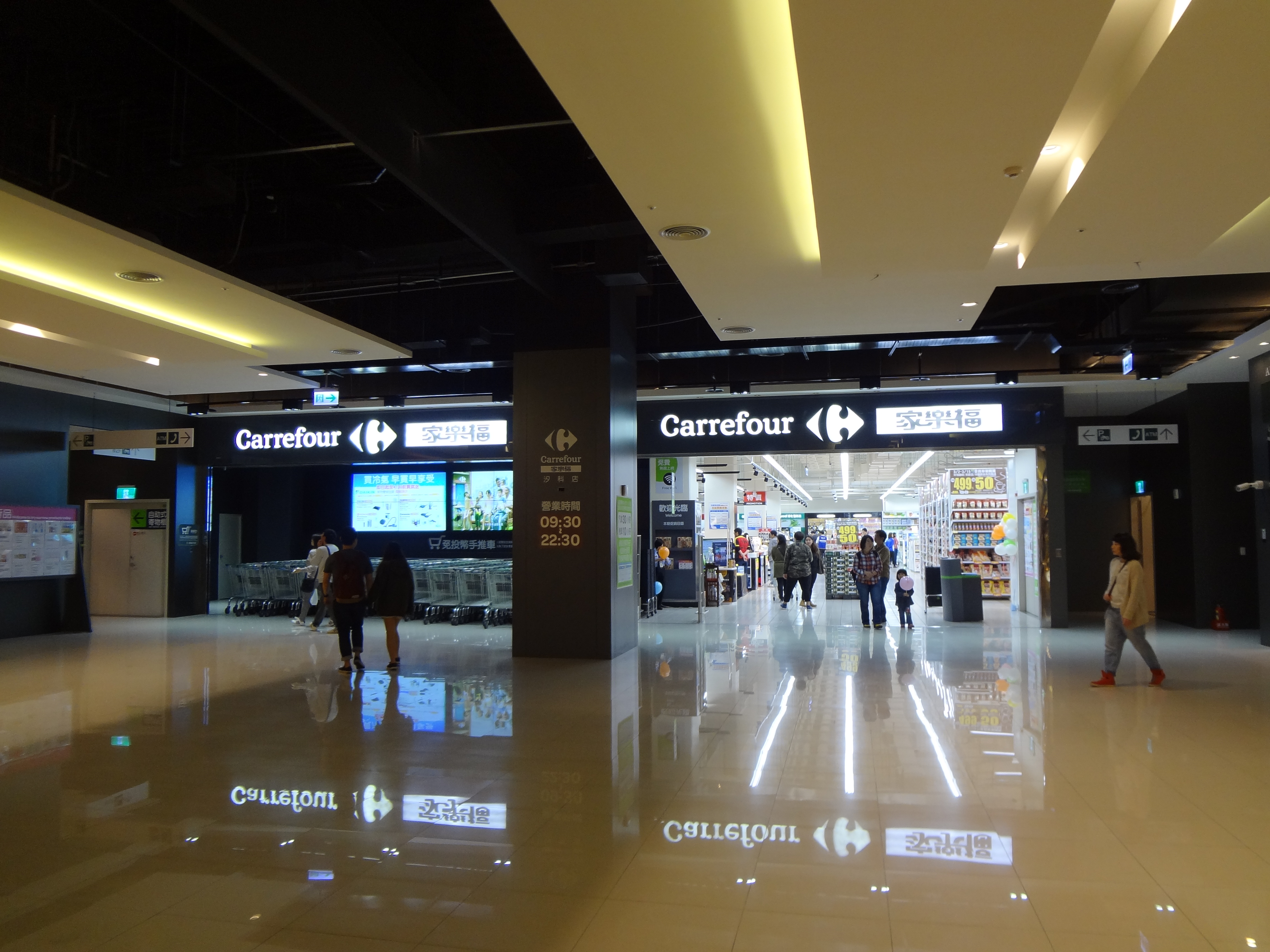
Carrefour Xike Store

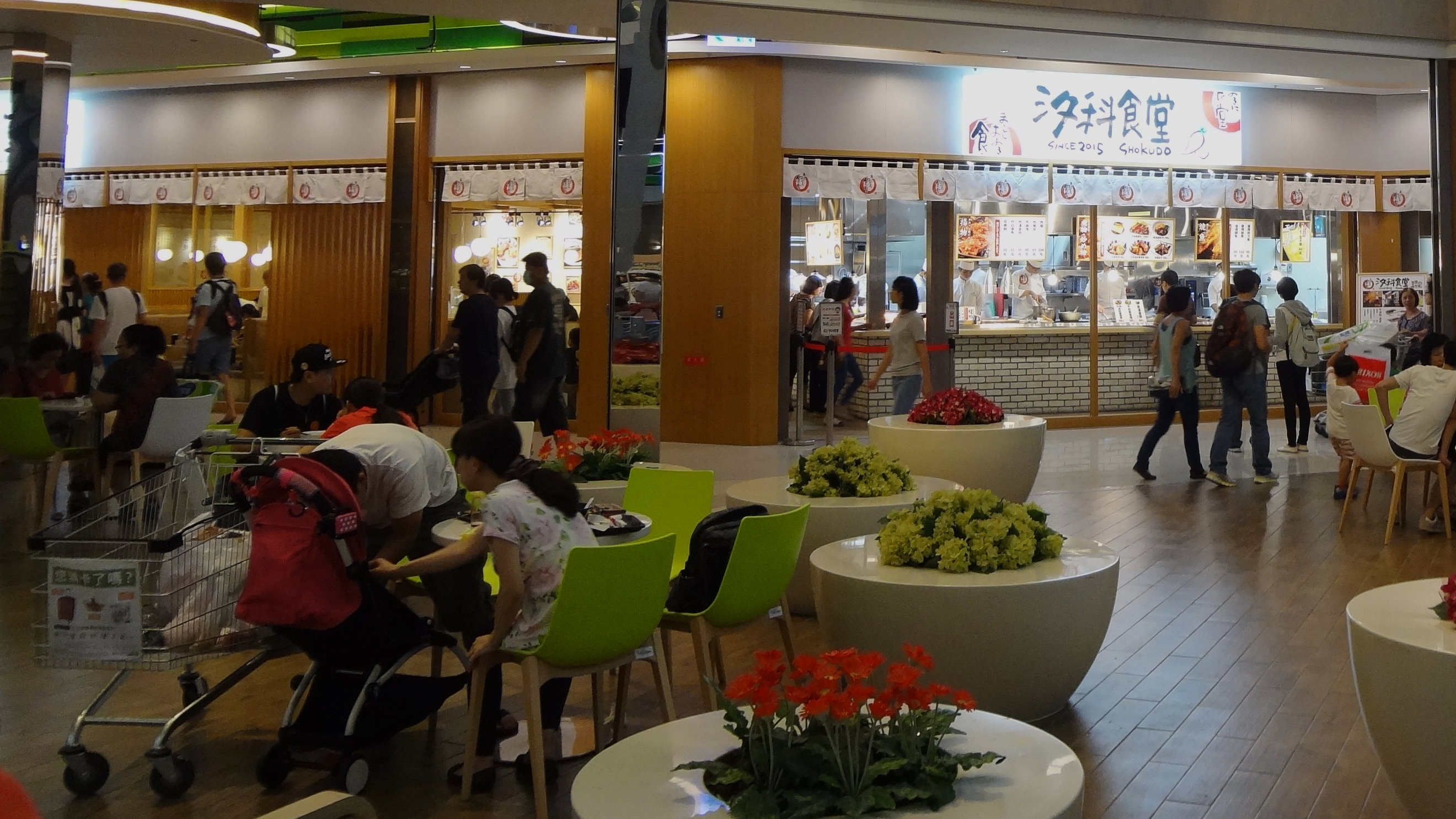
Food Court

== See also ==
- List of tourist attractions in Taiwan
- Farglory U-Town
