= Farglory U-Town =

Skyscraper complex in New Taipei, Taiwan

Farglory U-Town 遠雄U-TOWN
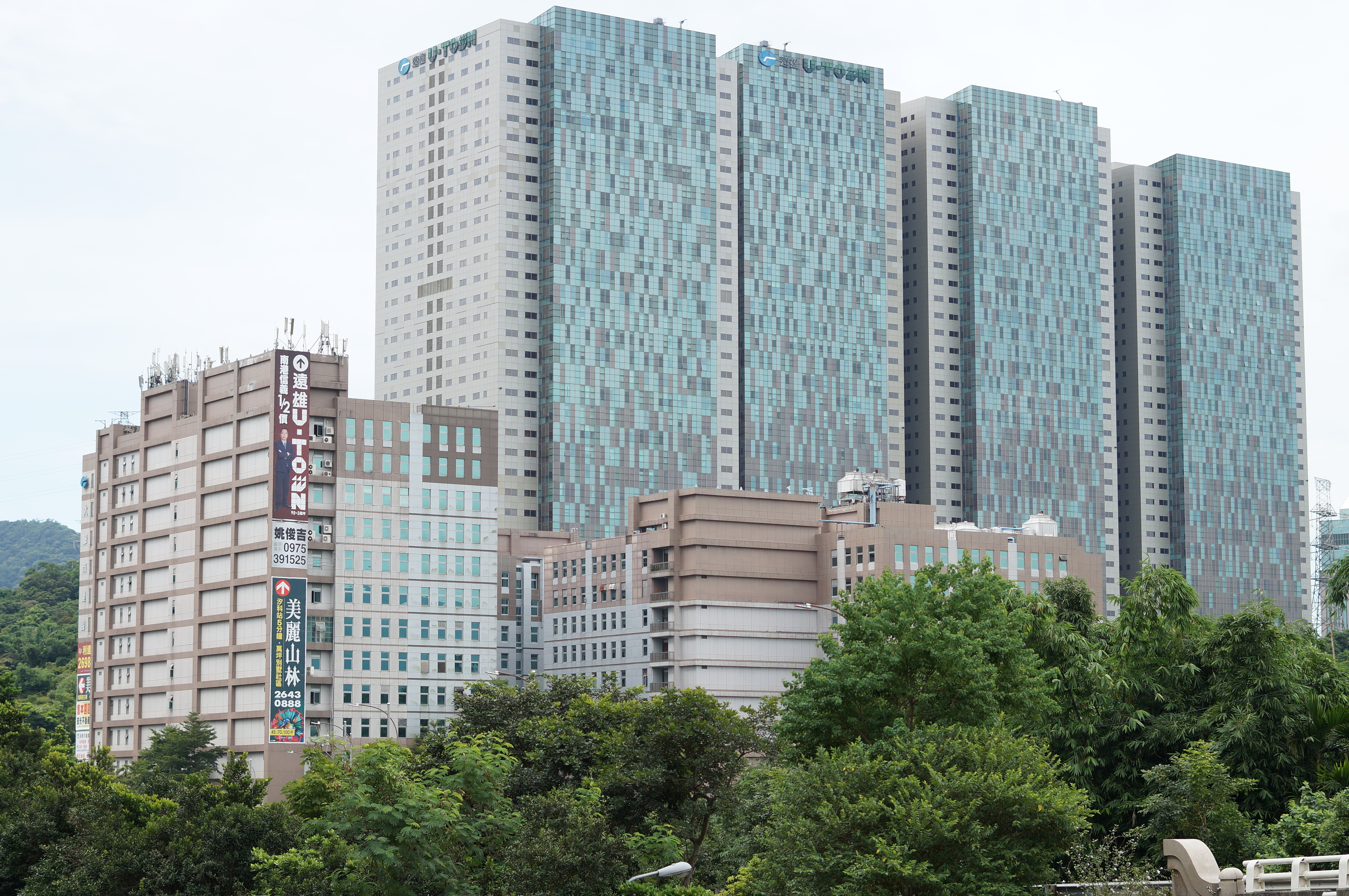
- Interactive map of the Farglory U-Town 遠雄U-TOWN area

General information
- Status: Completed
- Type: Office, Shopping center
- Location: Xizhi District, New Taipei, Taiwan
- Coordinates: 25°3′43″N 121°38′53.1″E
- Completed: 2015

Height
- Architectural: Towers B and C: 166 m (545 ft); Towers A & D: 151.8 m (498 ft)

Technical details
- Floor count: Towers B and C: 37; Towers A & D: 37
- Floor area: 734,609.45 m^{2} (7,907,270.3 sq ft)

The Farglory U-Town (Chinese: 遠雄U-TOWN; pinyin: Yuǎn xióng U-Town) is a skyscraper complex located in Xizhi District, New Taipei, Taiwan. The complex comprises four skyscraper buildings completed in 2015, with a total floor area of 734,609.45 m^{2} (7,907,270.3 sq ft). The tallest of the four buildings is Towers B and C, which have a height of 166 m (545 ft) and comprise 37 floors above ground, as well as 7 basement levels. Towers A and D have a height of 151.8 m (498 ft) with 37 floors above ground.

As of December 2020, they are the tallest buildings in Xizhi District, 10th tallest in New Taipei City and 35th tallest in Taiwan.

Floors B1 to 3 of the buildings house the IFG Farglory Square, a large shopping mall. Floor 4 houses the U-Museum and floors 5 to 37 are office buildings.

== Location ==
The location of the complex is opposite to the Oriental Science Park and in close proximity to the Xike railway station.

== Gallery ==
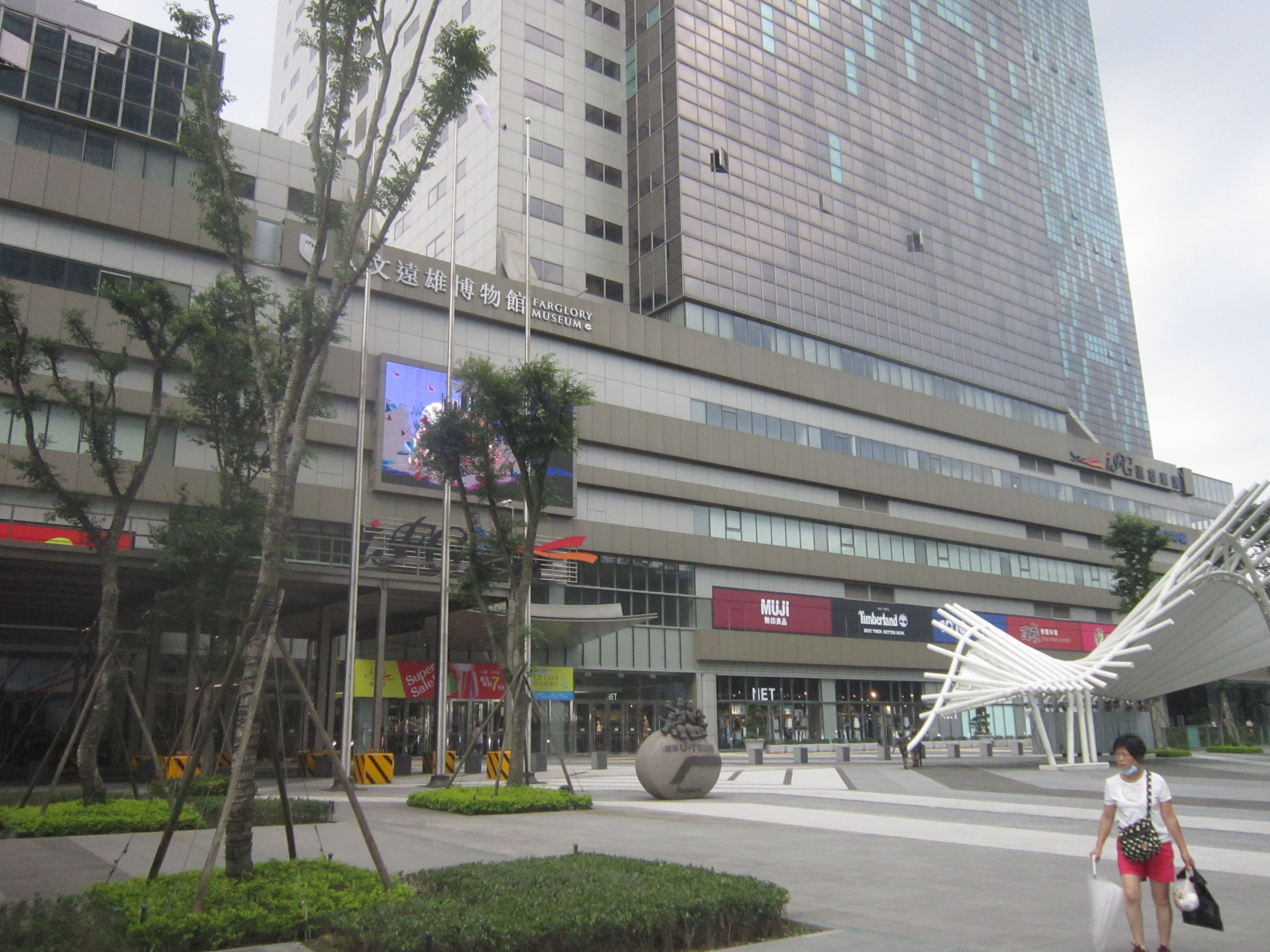
Entrance

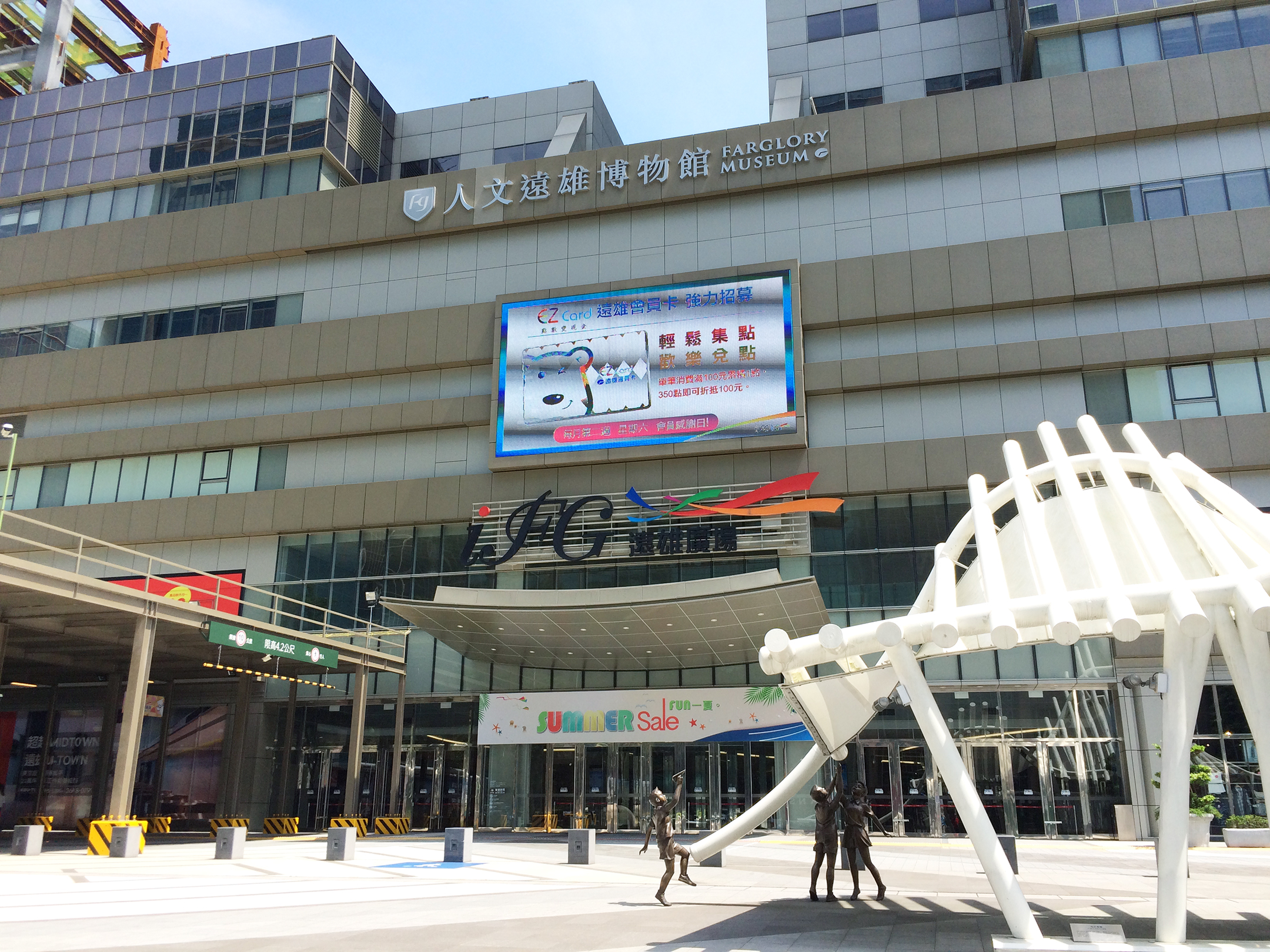
iFG Square

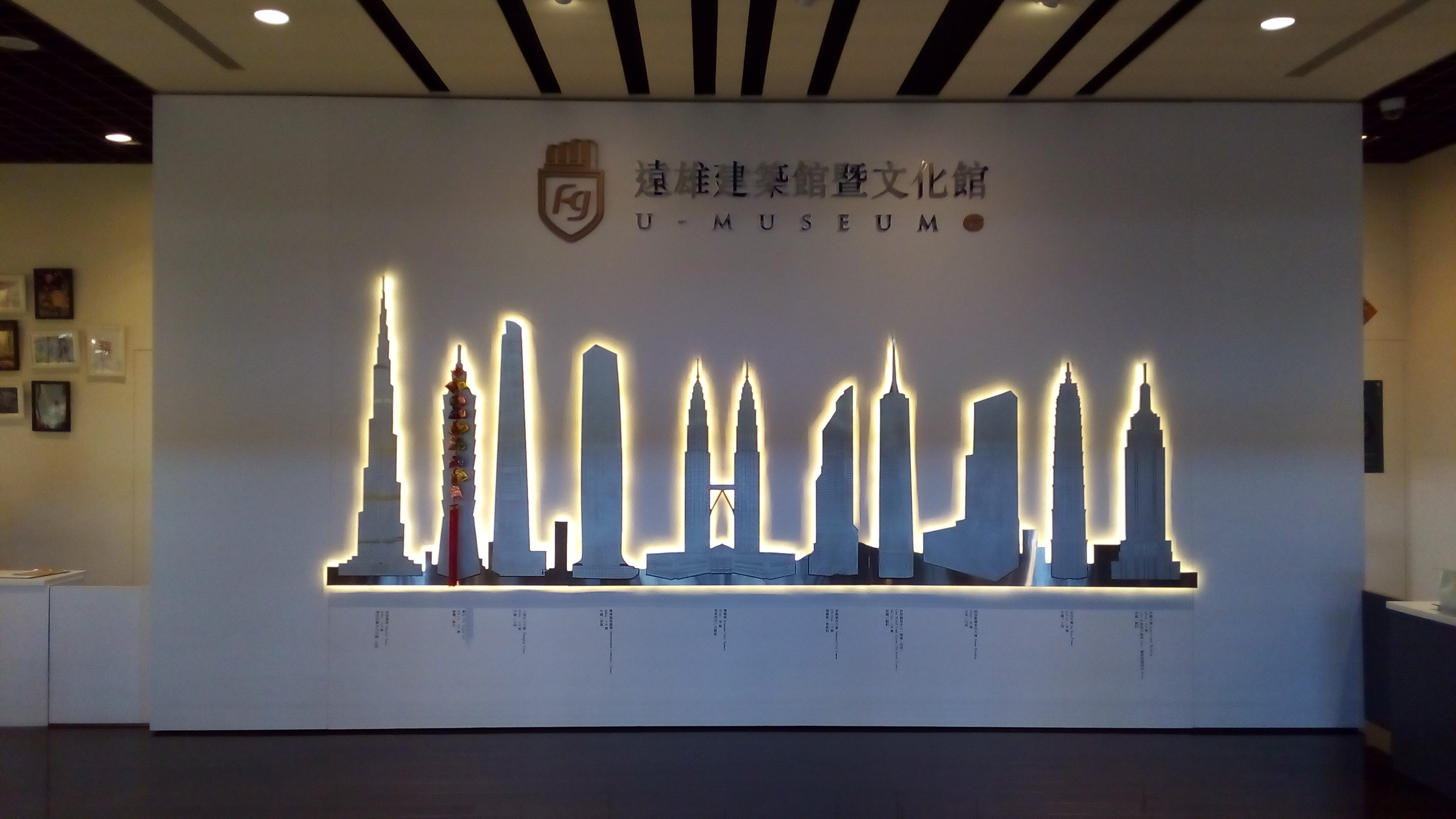
U-Museum

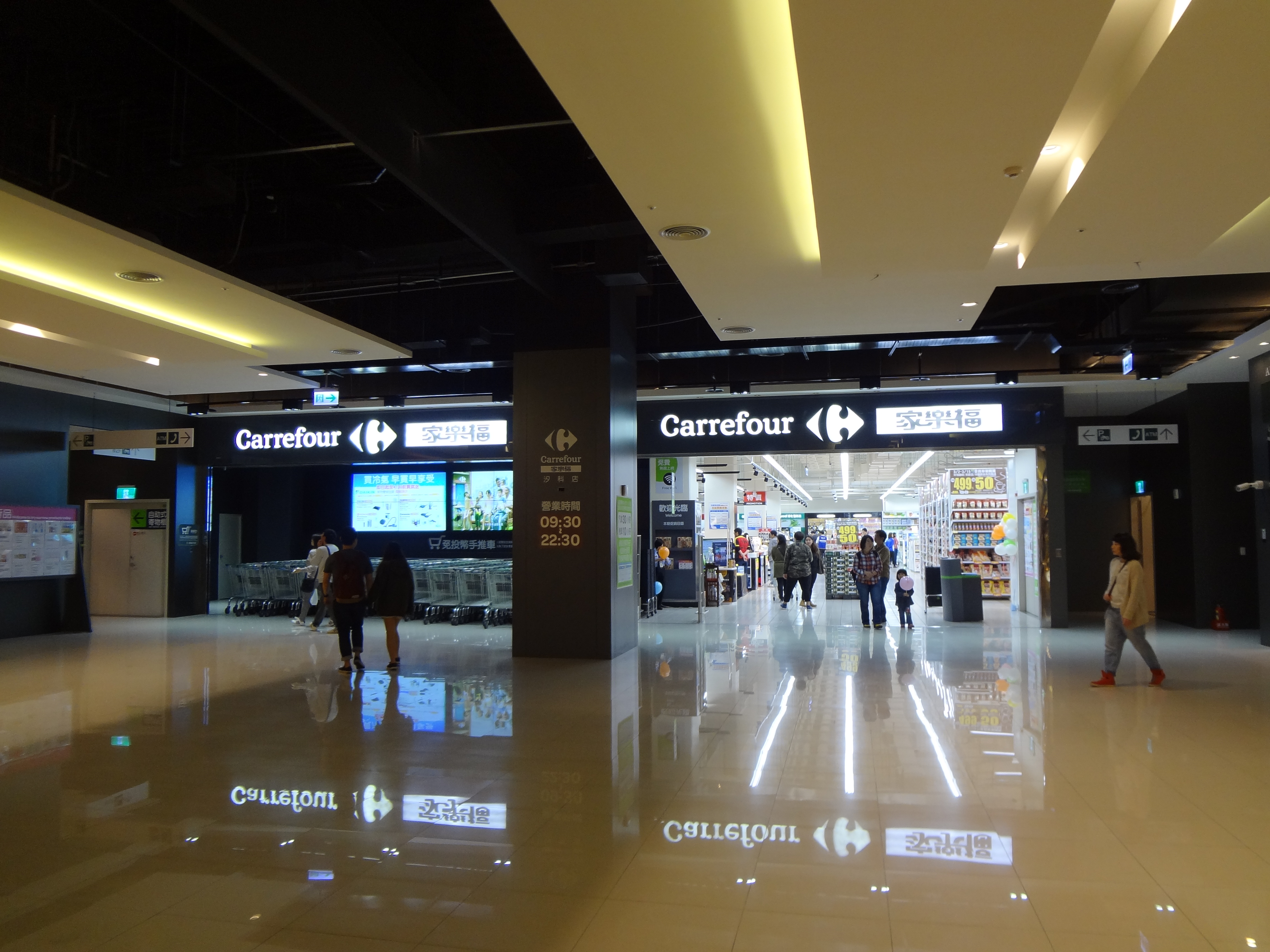
Carrefour Xike Store entrance

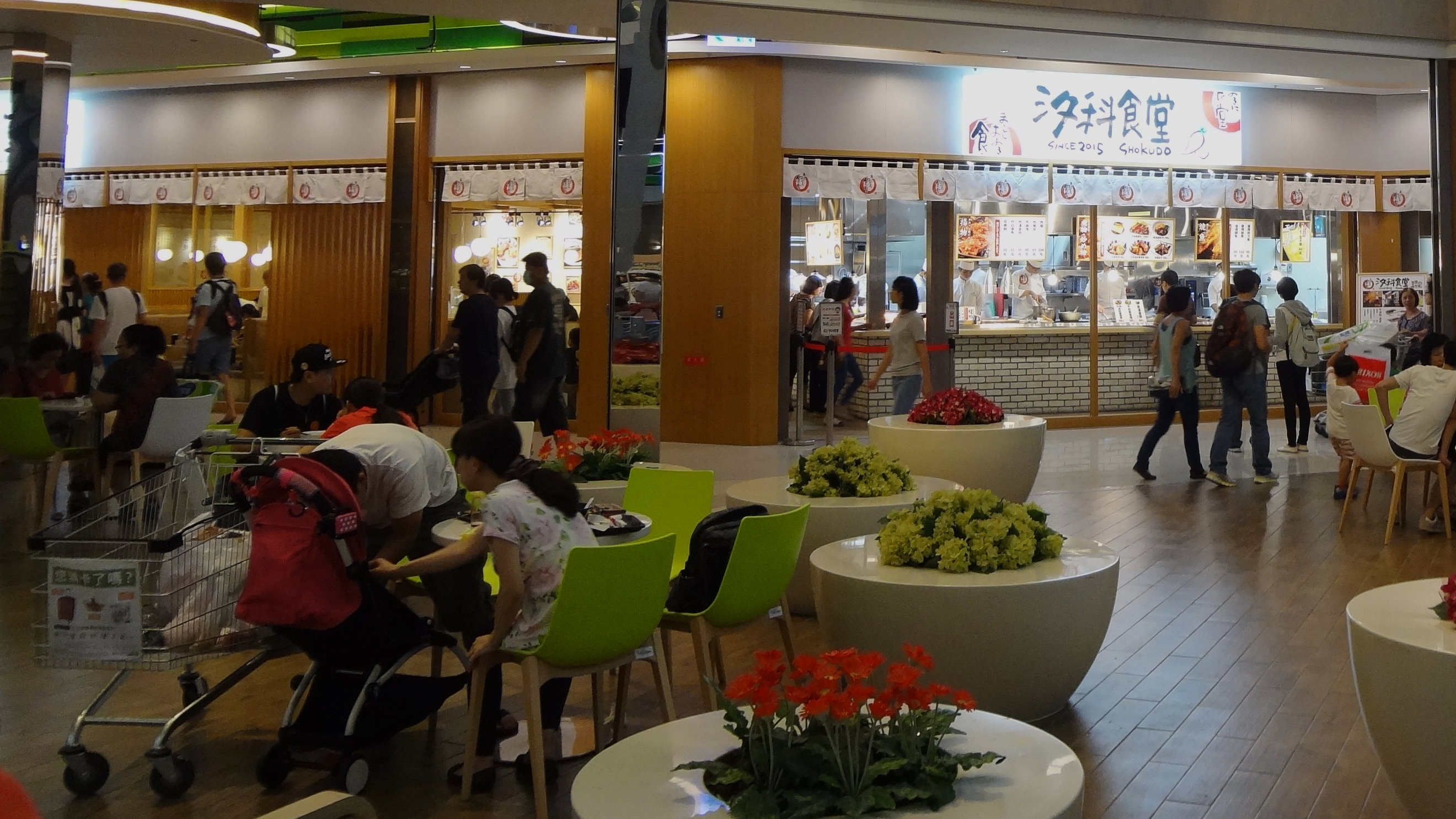
Food Hall

== See also ==
- List of tallest buildings in Taiwan
- List of tallest buildings in New Taipei City
- IFG Farglory Square
