= Timberland (company) =

American clothing and footwear company

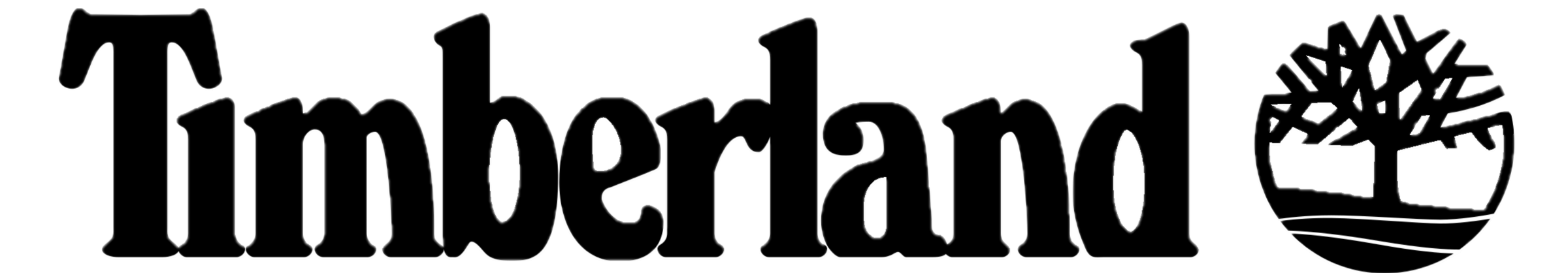

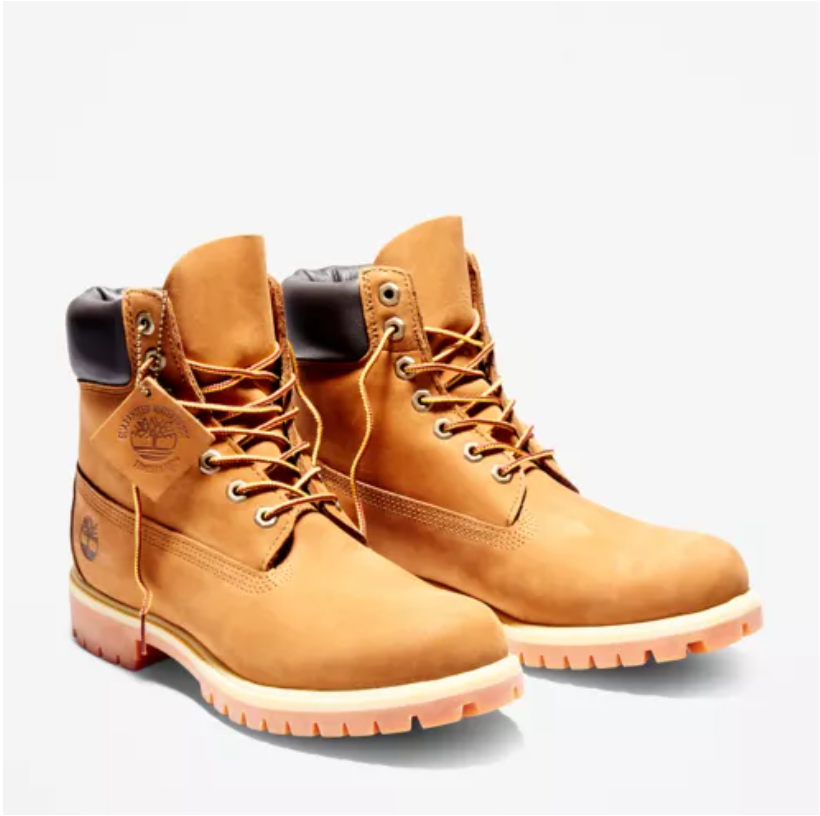
- Timberland six-inch boots
- Formerly: Abington Shoe Company
- Type: Subsidiary
- Industry: Fashion
- Founded: 1952 in Abington, Massachusetts (Swartz buys half-interest); 1978 (as the Timberland Company)
- Founder: Nathan Swartz
- Headquarters: Stratham, New Hampshire, U.S.
- Number of locations: c. 260 (2017)
- Products: Apparel: Footwear
- Revenue: US$1.78 billion (2023)
- Parent: VF Corporation
- Website: www.timberland.com

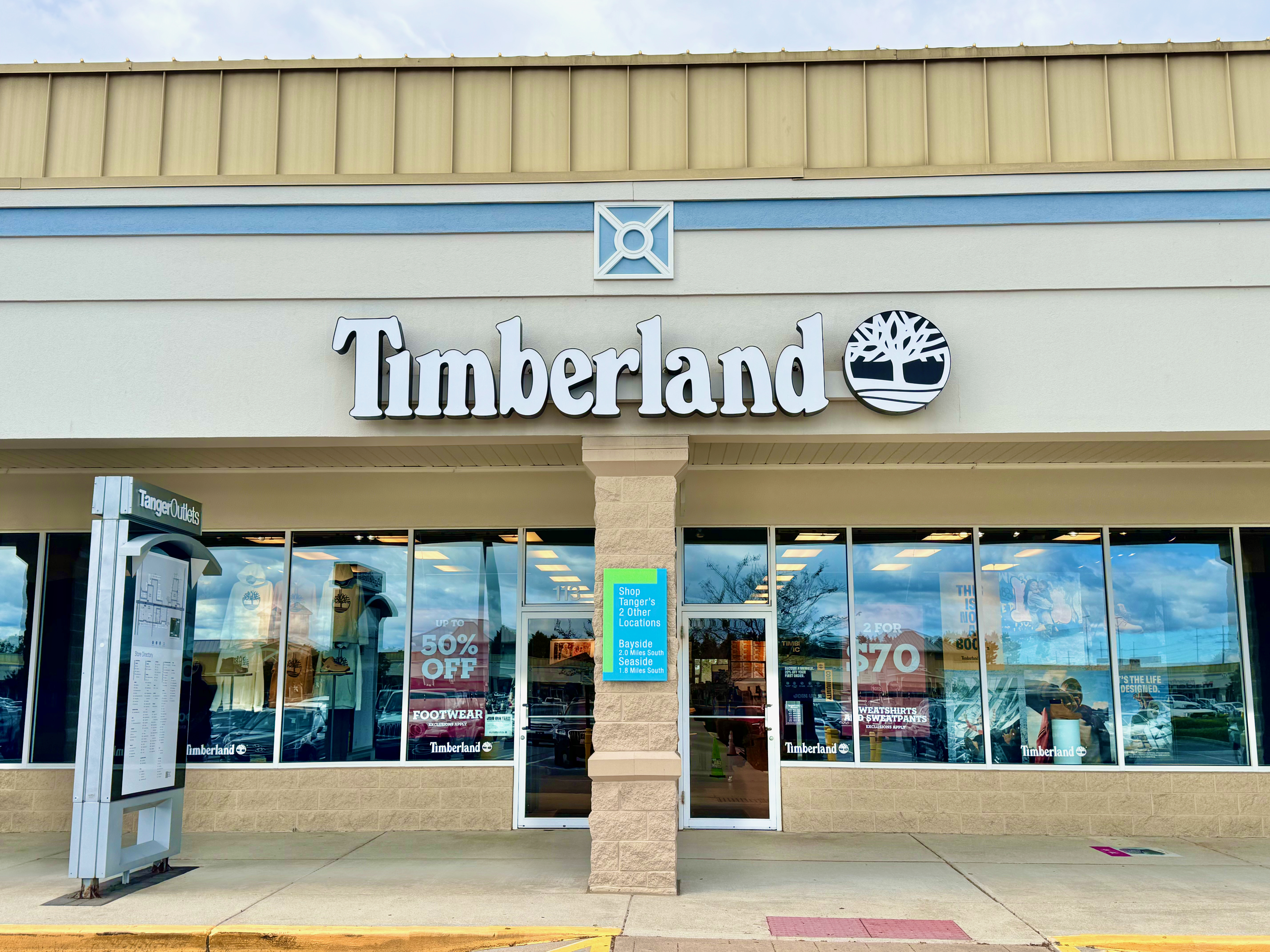
A Timberland store in Delaware

Timberland LLC is an American manufacturer and retailer of outdoor footwear and apparel owned by VF Corporation. The company also sells accessories including watches, eyewear, and leather goods. Timberland's corporate headquarters are located in Stratham, New Hampshire.

== History ==
In 1918, Nathan Swartz, a Jewish-born shoemaker from Odesa, Ukraine, started his shoe making career.He and his family eventually moved to Boston before World War 1. Nearby, the Abington Shoe Company was founded in 1933 in South Boston. Swartz bought half-interest in the company in 1952, and he and his sons eventually acquired the remaining shares. Through the 1960s the company specialized in making private-label boots and shoes for other brands. In 1969, Abington moved to Newmarket, New Hampshire, and focused on producing waterproof boots made with injection molding, capable of withstanding the winters of the region.

The Timberland boot was introduced in 1973. Its popularity grew, prompting the Swartzes to discontinue manufacturing for others and concentrate on expanding its own brand. The Abington Shoe Company was renamed The Timberland Company and incorporated in 1978.

Jeffrey Swartz, grandson of founder Nathan Swartz, joined the company in 1986. The following year the family took the company public. Herman Swartz led the company until he retired in 1986. He was succeeded as CEO by his brother Sidney, who retired in 1998. Jeffrey Swartz succeeded him to become Chief Executive Officer of the company. In June 2011, Timberland signed a definitive takeover agreement with VF Corporation at $43 per share or approximately $2 billion.

== Products ==
The company is primarily known for its footwear. Notable examples:

- The "Yellow Boot" is the company's best-known model, now considered iconic.
- Timberland PRO industrial boots
- Footwear made with recycled, organic, and renewable materials.

== Partnerships ==
Timberland has worked with numerous footwear and fashion brands to create one-off models; brands include Supreme, Tommy Hilfiger, Jimmy Choo, Off-White, Bee Line, and OVO. In late 2021, Supreme and Timberland collaborated with the MLB team New York Yankees to produce a Yankees-logoed boot.

In early 2024, Louis Vuitton released a line of shoes in collaboration with Timberland. PANGAIA and Timberland collaborated in 2024.

== Cultural impact ==
Despite Timberland building its image around a rugged "New Englander" lifestyle and rural blue collar work, Timberland boots came to have significant value in urban inner cities and Black neighborhoods in the 1980s and 1990s. The boots were taken up by rappers associated with hip hop, starting in the New York hip hop scene, and they soon became an enduring staple of Black, streetwear, and hip hop fashions. The New York Times reported on the fashion phenomenon in 1993, stating, "Seemingly overnight, Timberland and companies like Carhartt Inc. and North Face, which have made their reputations on manufacturing authentic outdoor and work apparel, have, in the parlance of the street, become ‘dope’ and ‘phat’."

Timberland boots, referred to by consumers as "Timbs" or "Butters", thus gained the nickname "the Air Jordans of boots" and became "the required footwear of the inner-urban set". Prominent artists who featured them in songs or music videos included Wu-Tang Clan, Mobb Deep, Nas, Tupac Shakur, The Notorious B.I.G., Busta Rhymes, DMX, Dipset, Rihanna, Drake, Kanye West, and Jay-Z. The company name became the namesake of the producer Timbaland.

=== Controversy ===
In a 1993 The New York Times article about "outdoor" clothing brands' cross-over appeal to Black and Hispanic inner-city youth, Jeffrey Swartz downplayed the importance of the urban youth market in Timberland's success, saying that the company concentrated its advertising on its core customers, "honest working people", adding that the urban market was not "sustainable". Though Swartz denied any plan to distance his company's name from young Black and Hispanic consumers to maintain its image, his comments led to a backlash among some Black artists who publicly dropped the brand. In an editorial in The Amsterdam News, Swartz denied the charges of racism and met with Black cultural leaders to explain Timberland's position. The company began more publicly to embrace the urban youth market. In the end, the controversy had little effect on sales.

== Volunteerism, philanthropy, and sustainability ==
The company's Path of Service program, first established in 1992, allows employees to take up to a week per year of paid leave to engage in local volunteer projects.

In 2001, Timberland began partnering with international NGOs to plant trees to reverse desertification of farmland and promote the cultivation of vegetables. Its partnership with Japanese NGO Green Network has focused on planting trees in the Horqin Desert of western China. As of 2019, the ongoing partnership had planted 2 million trees.

Beginning in 2010, Timberland entered into an agroforestry partnership with Haiti's Smallholder Farmers Alliance to increase farm acreage and crop yields through reforestation and improved farm methods. By 2015 the program had assisted some 3,200 farmers. In 2016, Timberland extended the partnership in Haiti with a goal of creating a new supply chain for sustainable cotton. The first products with Haiti-sourced cotton came on the market in May 2021.

In 2022, Timberland introduced the Timberloop product take back program, which gives customers the opportunity to return used footwear or clothing to be recycled or refurbished for resale. On Earth Day 2022, Timberland launched the Timberloop Trekker, a boot designed to be fully disassembled and recycled at the end of its life. In 2023, Timberland will continue to increase the use of regenerative natural materials.
