= Jeffrey Swartz =

American businessman

- Born: March 20, 1960 (age 66)
- Education: Phillips Academy
- Alma mater: Brown University; Dartmouth College
- Occupation: Businessman
- Known for: Former CEO, Timberland
- Children: 3 sons
- Relatives: Nathan Swartz (grandfather)

Jeffrey Swartz (born March 20, 1960) is an American businessman, and was formerly CEO of Timberland, founded by his grandfather, Nathan Swartz. He sold Timberland to VF Corporation in 2011.

== Early life ==
He was born on March 20, 1960 to a Jewish family, the son of Sidney and Judith Swartz. He was educated at Phillips Academy, Andover, Massachusetts, followed by a bachelor's degree from Brown University and an MBA from Dartmouth College, New Hampshire.

== Career ==
For 15 years Swartz was the CEO of Timberland, a company founded in 1952 by his grandfather.

Swartz owned the majority of the voting shares for Timberland. In 2011, as CEO, he was responsible for the sale of Timberland to VF Corporation for $2 billion.

== Personal life ==
Swartz is married, with three sons.
