= Nathan Swartz =

American shoemaker and businessman

- Born: July 1902; Odessa, Russian Empire (now Ukraine)
- Died: August 1984 (aged 82)
- Occupation: Businessman
- Known for: Founder of Timberland
- Spouse: Married
- Children: 2 sons
- Relatives: Jeffrey Swartz (grandson)

Nathan Swartz (July 1902 – August 1984) was a Ukrainian-born American shoemaker and businessman, known for founding the Timberland Company.

== Early life ==
Nathan Swartz was born to a poor Jewish family in July 1902 in Odessa, Kherson Governorate, the fourth generation of a family of shoemakers. Soon before the First World War, the family migrated to the US.

== Career ==
Swartz started as an apprentice in a New York shoe repair shop. In 1952, he bought a 50% stake in the Abington Shoe Company, in Massachusetts, which later became Timberland. He retired in 1968.

== Family ==
Swartz had two sons, Herman and Sidney. Herman led the company from 1968 to 1986, followed by Sidney from 1986 to 1998. In 1998, Sidney's son, Jeffrey Swartz, took over. In 2011, Jeffrey sold the company to VF for $2 billion.

== Trivia ==
Swartz lost several fingers in an industrial accident.
