= Julianne Swartz =

American artist

- Born: Julianne Swartz; 1967; Phoenix, Arizona, US
- Education: Bard College, Skowhegan School of Painting and Sculpture, University of Arizona
- Known for: Sound Art, new media, installation art, sculpture, public art
- Spouse: Ken Landauer
- Awards: Foundation for Contemporary Arts, Anonymous Was a Woman Award, American Academy of Arts and Letters, Joan Mitchell Foundation
- Website: Julianne Swartz

Julianne Swartz, How Deep is Your, PVC and plastic tubing, plexiglass, funnel, paint, LED lights, record player, mirror and 2-channel soundtrack, 2012; Installation view, deCordova Museum.

Julianne Swartz (born 1967) is a New York-based artist. She is known for immersive installations, architectural interventions and sculptures that bring sound, optics and kinetics into play to create alternative, multisensory experiences. She uses utilitarian materials (e.g., tubes, mirrors, lenses, magnets) to warp, reshape or deepen perception, generating unexpected, ephemeral and participatory experiences out of common situations. Critics suggest that her work inhabits liminal areas, both literally (transitory architectural spaces and functional systems) and conceptually, bridging the perceptible and evanescent, public and private, visual and embodied, affective and technical. Art in America critic Peter R. Kalb wrote, "Swartz appeals to the senses and emotions with a quiet lyricism, using unassuming materials and marshaling grand forces like wind and magnetism" to offer "a thoughtful excursion into sound, sight and psyche."

Swartz has exhibited at institutions including the Whitney Museum, MoMA PS1, Tate Liverpool, Massachusetts Museum of Contemporary Art (Mass MoCA) and Israel Museum, Jerusalem. She has been recognized by the Foundation for Contemporary Arts, Joan Mitchell Foundation, American Academy of Arts and Letters, and Anonymous Was a Woman.

Swartz lives in Stone Ridge, New York with her husband, Ken Landauer.

== Education and career ==
Swartz was born in Phoenix, Arizona in 1967. She studied poetry, receiving a BA in creative writing and photography from the University of Arizona in 1989, before attending the Skowhegan School of Painting and Sculpture (1999) and Bard College, where she earned an MFA in sculpture in 2003. Her mother, Beth Ames Swartz, is an established artist known for paintings and mixed-media works that explore light, spirituality, healing and feminist themes.

Swartz received early attention for artworks exploring visual perception and the act of looking, exhibited at the Brooklyn Museum of Art, Islip Art Museum, SculptureCenter and Artists Space between 1997 and 2003. In 2002, The Brooklyn Rail characterized her installation at Schroeder Romero involving a garden, mirrors, lenses and glass as ephemeral and painterly, "inhabit[ing] the everyday, transforming it, however briefly, into something poetic." Her first project to emphasize participants was Link/Line (2001), created for the Susquehanna Art Museum in response to a series of local hate crimes including the burning of an under-construction synagogue. It consisted of a continuous, 4.5-mile red sewing thread running from the museum through businesses, synagogues, churches, shops and homes and ending at a Jewish community center; its members agreed to "host" and watch over the thread, inspired by a symbolic practice called an eruv.

In 2003, Swartz broadened her perceptual interests to sound and emotional memory, seeking to extend audience engagement with her work. She gained wide recognition for sonic installations at the Whitney Biennial, New Museum (both 2004) and the Liverpool Biennial (Tate Liverpool, 2006). Later solo exhibitions have taken place at the Jewish Museum (2009), Museum of Contemporary Art Cleveland (2011), Oude Kerk, Amsterdam (2013) and Institute for Contemporary Art, Richmond (2019), among other venues. A mid-career survey of her work, "How Deep is Your," traveled from the deCordova Museum (2012) to the Scottsdale Museum of Contemporary Art (2013) and Indianapolis Museum of Art (2014).

In addition to her artmaking, Swartz has been a member of the art faculty at Bard College since 2006 and previously taught at the Skowhegan School of Art and in the MFA program at the School of Visual Arts.

== Work and reception ==
Swartz's work has centered on site-specific sonic and optical installations, sculpture and photographs. Her sound works have used low-tech and more sophisticated technologies to disperse music, recorded messages and ambient sound through large, multi-floor and multi-location sites, crossing dimensions of space and time. The optical installations often use lenses, mirrors and tubes to displace space and suggest a sense of perception in flux. Her often-minimal sculpture frequently employs optics, sound and kinetics.

=== Sound installations ===
For her first sound work, How Deep is Your (2003, MoMA PS1), Swartz connected speakers in the space's basement through PVC pipe to a large blue amplifying funnel on its top floor. The funnel emitted a faint overlay of the songs "How Deep Is Your Love" (the Bee Gees) and "Love" (John Lennon) that also leaked out on the journey up. For Somewhere Harmony (2004, Whitney Biennial), she piped layered recordings of people singing and speaking "Over the Rainbow" through clear tubes outfitted with mirrors and lenses along grooves in the museum's five-story stairwell, where it mixed with ambient sound. The piece tied visitors and various spaces together with interspersed sound, reflections of movement throughout the stairwell, and nostalgia activated by the song. Can You Hear Me (2004, New Museum) offered a participatory experience that crossed physical, sensory and social boundaries, joining art viewers and residents of the neighboring Sunshine Hotel—the Bowery's last transient hotel. A bright yellow plastic conduit equipped with mirrors served as an auditory and optical periscope, enabling visitors and passersby to peek into the hotel's lounge area and engage residents in conversation.

Julianne Swartz, Sine Body, blown glass, unglazed porcelain, electronics and sound generated from the objects, dimensions variable, 2017; Installation view, The Museum of Arts and Design, NYC.

In several acoustic installations, Swartz presented intimate spoken messages that "seeped" out of hidden speakers (Affirmation, 2006, Liverpool Biennial) or surrounded visitors in tapestries of sound, blurring notions of public and private. Terrain (2008, Indianapolis Museum of Art) was an immersive installation of 208 speakers strung from the ceiling of a large lobby. Visitors heard tender, whispered utterances by human voices orchestrated into a moving soundscape akin to wind, breaking surf or rustling leaves, which suggested the transience of affection, want and pleasure. The public work, Digital Empathy (2011–12, High Line Park, Manhattan) employed computer-generated voices emitted from elevators, drinking fountains and restrooms, whose messages The New York Times described as "intentionally subtle and hilariously mixed … equal parts infomercial, public service announcement and motivational mantra." The commissioned public bench installation We Complete (2017, Cambridge Common) used speakers activated by visitors—in this case, people holding hands—to play quotes about interdependence voiced by children. For the long-term installation In-Harmonicity, the Tonal Walkway (2016–ongoing, Mass MOCA), Swartz integrated a 20-channel, non-narrative soundscape of single sung notes and spoken text spoken into a footbridge.

Her Sine Body (2017, Museum of Art and Design) featured 18 glass and ceramic "Re-Sounding Vessels" that amplified, conducted and emitted a specific tone generated through an electronic feedback process based on the shape and air volume of each vessel. In 2018, she created the sound installation Joy, Still at Grace Farms, which turned the site's amphitheater into an instrument, using elements embedded beneath the floor that created sound and physical vibrations; Lilly Wei described the 16-channel composition, which included people's thoughts about joy, as a "symphony of voices, hums, thrums, the aural assuming a corporeal presence."

=== Optical installations ===
Julianne Swartz, Four Directions from Hunters Point (West Interrupted), lenses, stainless steel, glass and view, 14" diameter inset into exterior wall, 2019; Installation view, Hunters Point Community Library, Queens, NY.

Swartz's optical works date back to her early career; she recreated two of them for her "How Deep Is Your" exhibitions. Excavation (2004/2012) featured transparent winding tubes suspended from clear cylindrical columns that led to a rough hole and crack in a wall through which viewers could see a small, intense rainbow. For Line Drawing (2004/2012), she ran thin blue tape across walls and in and out of orifices that viewers could peer into, where it seemed to grow and thin in distorted three-dimensional space before entering another hole.

Blue Sky with Rainbow (2016) is a long-term work that uses lenses and fiber-optic cable to harness sunlight from the roof of the Art Gallery of Western Australia; it emits a bright beam inside the museum near the entry and—after entering a cavity behind a wall—meets a prism and fills the interior space with an ever-shifting rainbow. In the permanent New York Percent for Art commission, Four Directions From Hunters Point (2019), Swartz embedded four circular optical portals in the walls and roof of a Queens library designed by Steven Holl. The portals generate abstract views of the site and its idyllic surroundings and mirror the library's function of transporting visitors to new perspectives; the installation received a New York City Public Design Commission award for Excellence in Design.

=== Sculpture and photographs ===
Swartz's sculpture has more often emphasized optical effects involving perceptual displacement, physical sensation, motion, time and balance. In solo exhibitions between 2004 and 2007, she presented a range of such work: forest-like constructions of fiber-optic cables, PVC pipe, mirrors, magnifiers and periscopes offering refracted and reflected views; photographs of bubbles, water drops and mirrors capturing dislocated skyscapes and landscapes; and delicate studies in visual tension, such as Spectrum, a rainbow of magnets attached to wires that arced from the wall and rose from the floor. Artforum's Martha Schwendener characterized them as "aligned with older ideas and technologies: the imagined single viewer of one-point perspective, the camera obscura, or the stereoscope … [there's] an enduring sense of wonder at the beauty and strangeness still achievable with optical and sonic tricks."

In subsequent series, Swartz used delicate forms and movements and precariousness to convey pathos and human emotion. "Hope Studies" (2007) comprised eight simple, quivering assemblages with ticking clock mechanisms embedded in concrete that activated imperceptible, insistent movements of wire and string. Rhizome critic Bill Hanley wrote, "Resembling weeds growing up from their inert brutalist bases, the series … measures seconds in figurative gestures that evoke human fragility in the face of passing time." Her "Stability Studies" (2012) featured carefully balanced structures that seemed to defy gravity, while "Surrogates" (2012) consisted of stacked cement-and-mica blocks with concealed clock motors, whose dimensions corresponded to those of Swartz, her husband and her daughter; their erratic ticking evoked heartbeats and time bombs, suggesting the notion of family as a precarious balancing act.

In her "Bone Scores" (2016) and "Void Weaves" (2017), Swartz created works of wire, paper, ceramic, nets and magnets that translated inaudible audio recordings (e.g., of breathing, a Geiger counter, a rainstorm, fireworks) into vibration and gesture. Within each work, coiled wire carrying electrical current stimulated magnets to produce periodic shudders and vibrations that Marjorie Welish wrote, were "dissonant with respect to the loveliness of the visual elements as initially encountered."

== Awards and collections ==
Swartz has been recognized with fellowships and awards from the Foundation for Contemporary Arts, Anonymous Was a Woman, UrbanGlass, American Academy of Arts and Letters, Joan Mitchell Foundation, New York Foundation for the Arts, Public Art Fund and Bronx Museum of the Arts, among others. She has received artist residencies from Cité internationale des arts, Art Omi and Skowhegan.

Her work belongs to the public collections of the Art Gallery of Western Australia, Colby College Museum of Art, deCordova Museum, Indianapolis Museum of Art, MASS MoCA, Phoenix Art Museum, and Scottsdale Museum of Contemporary Art.
