= Beth Ames Swartz =

American painter

Beth Ames Swartz (born February 5, 1936) is an American visual artist. While primarily an abstract artist, her paintings often incorporate words and symbols representing philosophical concepts shared by people of different cultural world views. Her daughter, Julianne Swartz, is a New York-based artist.

== Personal life ==
Beth Ames was born in New York City, the daughter of Dr. Maurice U. and Dorothy Andres Ames. Her father taught high school science and subsequently became Assistant Superintendent of Schools for the New York City school system. She grew up in Manhattan as the youngest of three children. Her brother, Bruce Ames, is a professor of Biochemistry and Molecular Biology Emeritus at the University of California, Berkeley, and a senior scientist at Children's Hospital Oakland Research Institute (CHORI).

Beth Ames attended The High School of Music & Art in New York City, and Cornell University in Ithaca, New York, graduating in 1957 with a Bachelor of Science degree. She obtained her Master of Arts degree in 1959 from New York University.

In 1959, Beth Ames Swartz moved to Phoenix, Arizona, with her husband Melvin Jay Swartz whom she divorced in 1984. In 1991 Swartz began living part-time in New York City where she met her second husband, art dealer John D. Rothschild. In 1995, Swartz returned to Paradise Valley, Arizona, where she currently resides with John.

== Art career ==
The process of painting is integral to Swartz's art making process and to the creation of her multiple series of works. Her expressionist paintings are rich with texture built with layers of thin acrylic washes, impasto text, and collaged paper. Her art practice has been guided by various aesthetic inspirations, such as the Rothko Chapel in Houston, Wassily Kandinsky's Concerning the Spiritual in Art, John Marin's seascapes, and Robert Smithson's Spiral Jetty.

Moreover, the Betty Friedan's The Feminine Mystique and Carol Christ's Diving Deep and Surfacing: Women Writers on Spiritual Quests influenced Swartz's incorporation of feminist discourse to explore the historical context of female empowerment, such as in her Israel Revisited series.

According to Swartz, she uses words and visual elements from various religious and philosophical systems (Native American Healing practices, Buddhism, Jewish Mysticism, Christianity) “in order to facilitate communication with viewers on both the conscious and unconscious level." Swartz synthesizes these spiritual traditions and beliefs with the purpose of revealing the commonality between them.”

Additionally, the theme of pilgrimage is a prominent theme in Swartz's art. She refers to pilgrimage as her way of “going beyond the dwelling—beyond the container—beyond the limits of my own identity.”

=== 1970s ===
==== Meditation, 1971-1973 ====
In her Meditation series, Swartz utilized the technique of wet on wet acrylic paint on canvas as a meditative act of expressing her spiritual fluidity. Swartz was inspired by her reading of Alan Watts, especially his The Wisdom of Insecurity. Watts advised that “faith has no preconceptions; it is a plunge into the unknown.” He advocated the Zen notion that freedom from anxieties and insecurities can be achieved by keeping focused on the present. According to Watts, “When . . . you realize that you live in, that indeed you are this moment now, and no other, that apart from this there is no past and no future, you must relax and taste to the full, whether it be pleasure or pain.” Inspired by Watts, Swartz began practicing meditation.

==== Israel Revisited, 1976-1983 ====
In the 1970s, Swartz started incorporating fire and earth to evoke the beauty that arises from destruction, as a metaphor for the uncertainties of life.

Israel Revisited is a series of works and a conceptual project that originated as an exhibition at the Jewish Museum in New York and then traveled throughout the United States from September 1981 to December 1983. In 1976, Swartz traveled to Israel where she sought a metaphysical and historical connection with the nation and its land. During the duration of her stay, Swartz located ten sacred sites throughout Israel that were meant to symbolize the women of Israel's historical land. These sites were reconfigured in Swartz's Ten Sites series of works with the memory and spirit of each woman. Queen of Sheba, Rachel, and Rebekah were among the biblical and historical female figures Swartz honored. She specifically chose these women because they symbolized the message of the Shekhinah. This ritual act of uniting women with their land not only honors Jewish women but also celebrates the female principle called the Shekhinah, which is present in Kabbalah as part of the divine entity.

At each of the sites, Swartz performed a fire ritual that consisted of scratching, mutilating, and burning the surface of paper. With this fire ritual, Swartz created scrolls of rice paper that were marked with color and metallic pigment, buried for one lunar month, and subjected to burned marks. She also used the earth as pigment in her process of creating the scrolls. In regards to her artistic and spiritual journey in Israel, Swartz revealed that it was a personal quest in gaining “dignity and continuity” from the earth after the alienation she had experienced in the city environment.

=== 1980s ===
==== A Moving Point of Balance, 1983-1985 ====
A Moving Point of Balance series premiered at the Nickle Arts Museum in Calgary, Canada in 1985. The exhibition toured to nine museums in the United States through 1991 and was presented at the first Medical Arts Conference in New York in 1993. It is a participatory installation designed with specific light and sound to be experienced as a healing environment. The series of seven paintings are based on the seven East Indian chakras. These chakras symbolize parts of the body that govern spiritual, intellectual, and emotional equilibrium. The installation invites participants to activate their intuitive, kinesthetic experience through their participation with the chakras. Each of the paintings is made with metal leaf, crushed crystals, and micro-glitter to give its surfaces a reflective quality in reference to the radiance of the chakra energies. Upon entering the installation participants encounter a medicine wheel meant to guide them to a larger universe and a higher consciousness.

The idea for the series was conceived when Swartz took part in a medicine wheel ceremony with Navajo medicine man David Paladin and in a pilgrimage with Hopi Elder Preston Monongye.

Before beginning work on the series, Swartz went to seven pilgrimage sites to perform rituals as ceremonial precludes to each of the chakra paintings. Some of the sites included Prophecy Rock in Hopiland, Arizona, Chaco Canyon in New Mexico, and Carnac on the Brittany Coast.

A Moving Point of Balance was reinstalled at the Walter Art Gallery in Scottsdale on March 1-March 30, 2015, and was featured in the documentary film Beth Ames Swartz: Reminders of Invisible Light.

==== Celestial Visitations, 1987 ====
In response to her mother's heart attack, Swartz created her Celestial Visitations series, consisting of fifteen paintings with the figure of an angel. In Kabbalah, the angel symbolizes the good deeds performed in one's lifetime. Swartz created the angel figures with the hope that “their presence might help my mother go to heaven." Her mother Dorothy Ames died in March 1988, a day after Swartz completed Celestial Visitation, #5.

=== 1990s ===
==== A Story for the Eleventh Hour, 1993-1994 ====
The series A Story for the Eleventh Hour was a continuation of Swartz's work with the earth and its spiritual significance and connection to humankind. In Swartz's previous series, The Wounded Healer, from 1991, she referred to the inborn hurt and renewal of the shaman. The title of the series derives from the wounded healer concept described in Jean Houston's book The Search for the Beloved.

A Story for the Eleventh Hour is a series of fifteen paintings based on a myth in which Earth and humanity, being on the brink of extinction, are eventually saved through human enlightenment. Swartz visualized a symbolic mantra, that is, a figurative group of archetypal images that invite viewers to look into themselves and find their way. Each painting in the series includes a triune eye (I – Eye – Aye) as well as a rhyming counterpoint to this image, “Die”: the "I" of ego, the "eye" of seeing, the "aye" of affirmation, and the "dying" that occurs with the giving up of ego. Swartz fashions a journey from the smaller story (the "I" of ego) into the larger story (the "aye" of affirmation), a journey that asks for a giving up of self in exchange for a belief in others, both as individual beings and, collectively, as humankind. Ideas from Rupert Sheldrake, Alice Bailey, Jean Houston, T. S. Eliot, Christianity, Hinduism, and Buddhism permeate this series.

==== Shen Qi, 1996-1999 ====
In 1996, Swartz discovered Shen Qi, a philosophical system that advances the belief in spiritual bonding through community. She produced a series of paintings based on Shen Qi using gold leaf to superimpose a gold grid onto under-images as a meditative technique. Swartz wished to entice a “quite tranquility” in the viewer. The paintings, composed of acrylic, gold leaf, and mixed media on canvas, have a powerful, emanating energy, as patterns of reds, blues, and violets are interrupted and transformed by patches of celestial gold. Some of the paintings contain all three colors while others are predominantly dark red or blue, which creates a stark contrast with the vibrant gold leaf.

=== 2000s ===
==== The Thirteenth Moon, 2006-2008 ====
The Thirteenth Moon series of paintings was inspired by the poetry of the eighth century Chinese poets Du Fu and Li Bai. In pairing poetry with paintings, Swartz sought to heighten the meaning of each one through the marriage of the visual and the written word, which emanates spiritual awareness and emotional depth.

The poetic words are incorporated harmoniously into the paintings’ composition: the words rhythmically encircle the round Moon of the painting An Hour of Changing Scenes or follow the horizontal movement of the textured horizontal bands of land below the Moon. The series exemplifies Swartz's continued transformation of the painting frame's role in relation to the image it frames. In previous paintings the frame is painted to become part of the painting, but in The Thirteenth Moon paintings the frame's role acquires new significance, for it contains words from the poetry written on the paintings' canvas.

In 2008, Arizona State University published a catalogue titled The Word in Paint with essays on The Thirteenth Moon paintings along with poetry by poets from the ASU MFA Creative Writing Program, written in response to Swartz's paintings.

=== 2010s ===
==== Reminders of Invisible Light, 2014-2016 ====
The 28-minute, documentary film, Reminders of Invisible Light, chronicles Swartz's life and work with the aim of encouraging others to reflect on their own personal and spiritual value. Featuring interviews with Swartz and close ups of her paintings and her time in the studio, the documentary film focuses on Beth's perseverance in overcoming a difficult childhood and building a successful career as an artist. Beth hopes that her life story will motivate viewers to address and surmount their own struggles by accessing their creative potential.

Odyssey Film LLC produced the documentary through its principals Suzanne D. Johnson, Producer, and Dr. Penelope Price, editor, and was funded through donations to the Phoenix Institute of Contemporary Art (phICA).

The film had a one night premiere at the Phoenix Art Museum in February, 2015. It premiered on Arizona PBS Friday on March 31, 2016, and aired again on April 3, 2016. The film is currently available to PBS stations in the United States.

==== Tikkun Olam: Repairing the World, 2016 ====
Her most recent exhibition, curated by Robert Pela of R. Pela Contemporary Art, presents a considerable selection of Swartz's art, ranging from the 1960s to 2015. The exhibition was held at the Arizona Jewish Historical Society in Phoenix.

==== Breakfast Club ====
For 15 years, Swartz has been hosting the Breakfast Club, which gives Phoenix area artists the opportunity to meet other artists, critique each other's work, and connect with curators and art professionals. The Breakfast Club currently has more than 55 artists. According to Swartz, her “main love” is advocating for Arizona artists, supporting and encouraging their careers.

== Awards and exhibitions ==
Selected Solo Exhibitions

- 2011 New York, NY, ACA Galleries, The Word in Paint
- 2010 Los Angeles, CA, Lawrence Asher Gallery, The Word in Paint
- 2008 Phoenix, AZ, Arizona State University, College of Public Programs and Virginia G. Piper Center for Creative Writing, The Word in Paint
- 2005 Aspen, CO, Aspen International Art, Time's Call
- 2004 Scottsdale, AZ, Vanier Galleries Ltd, The Fire and the Rose
- 2002, Ithaca, NY, Herbert F. Johnson Museum of Art, Cornell University, Reminders of Invisible Light: The Art of Beth Ames Swartz
- 2002 Phoenix, AZ, Phoenix Museum of Art, Reminders of Invisible Light: The Art of Beth Ames Swartz
- 1998 Montagnola, Switzerland, Hermann Hesse Museum, A Story for the Eleventh Hour
- 1989 Palm Springs, CA, Palm Springs Desert Museum
- 1985 Calgary, Canada, The Nickle Arts Museum
- 1983 Tel Aviv, Israel, American Cultural Center, Israel Revisited
- 1982-83, Berkeley, CA, Judah Magnes Museum, Israel Revisited
- 1981 New York, NY, The Jewish Museum, Israel Revisited

Selected Collections

- The Brooklyn Museum of Art, Brooklyn, NY
- Denver Art Museum, Denver, CO
- The Jewish Museum, New York, NY
- National Museum of American Art, Smithsonian Institution, Washington, DC
- Phoenix Art Museum, Phoenix, AZ
- San Francisco Museum of Modern Art, San Francisco, CA
- Scottsdale Museum of Contemporary Art, Scottsdale, AZ

Selected Awards

- 1985 Phoenix, AZ, Governor's Award, Outstanding Women of Arizona - Women Who Create
- 1994 New York, NY, Awarded Flow Funding grant for discretionary philanthropic use for non-personal benefit by Marion Rockefeller Weber
- 2001 Phoenix, AZ, Recipient, Governor's Arts Award, the highest honor in Arizona for one individual who may be a visual or performing artist or a writer.
- 2003 New York, NY, Veteran Feminists of America, Medal of Honor

Books and Catalogs

- Wortz, Melinda. Inquiry into Fire: Beth Ames Swartz. Scottsdale, AZ: Scottsdale Center for the Arts, 1978.
- Rand, Harry. Israel Revisited: Beth Ames Swartz. Scottsdale, AZ: Beth Ames Swartz, 1981.
- Nelson, Mary Carroll. Connecting: The Art of Beth Ames Swartz. Flagstaff, AZ: Northland Press, 1984. ISBN 0-87358-343-4.
- Carde, Margaret and John Perrault. Beth Ames Swartz, 1982-1988: A Moving Point of Balance. Scottsdale, AZ: A Moving Point of Balance, Inc., 1988.
- Rothschild, John and Berta Sichel. Beth Ames Swartz: A Story for the Eleventh Hour. New York: E. M. Donahue Gallery, 1994.
- Raven, Arlene, David Rubin and Eva S. Jungermann. Reminders of Invisible Light: The Art of Beth Ames Swartz. New York, Hudson Hills Press in conjunction with Phoenix Art *Museum, 2002. ISBN 1-55595-208-9.
- Perrault, John. Beth Ames Swartz: The Fire and the Rose. Scottsdale, AZ: Vanier Galleries; Aspen, CO: Aspen International Art, 2004.
- Rothschild, John (ed.). The Word in Paint, Paintings by Beth Ames Swartz. With essays by Donald Kuspit and John Rothschild. Tempe, AZ: Arizona State University, 2008. ISBN 978-0-615-22224-0.
