= Jan Swartz =

American businesswoman

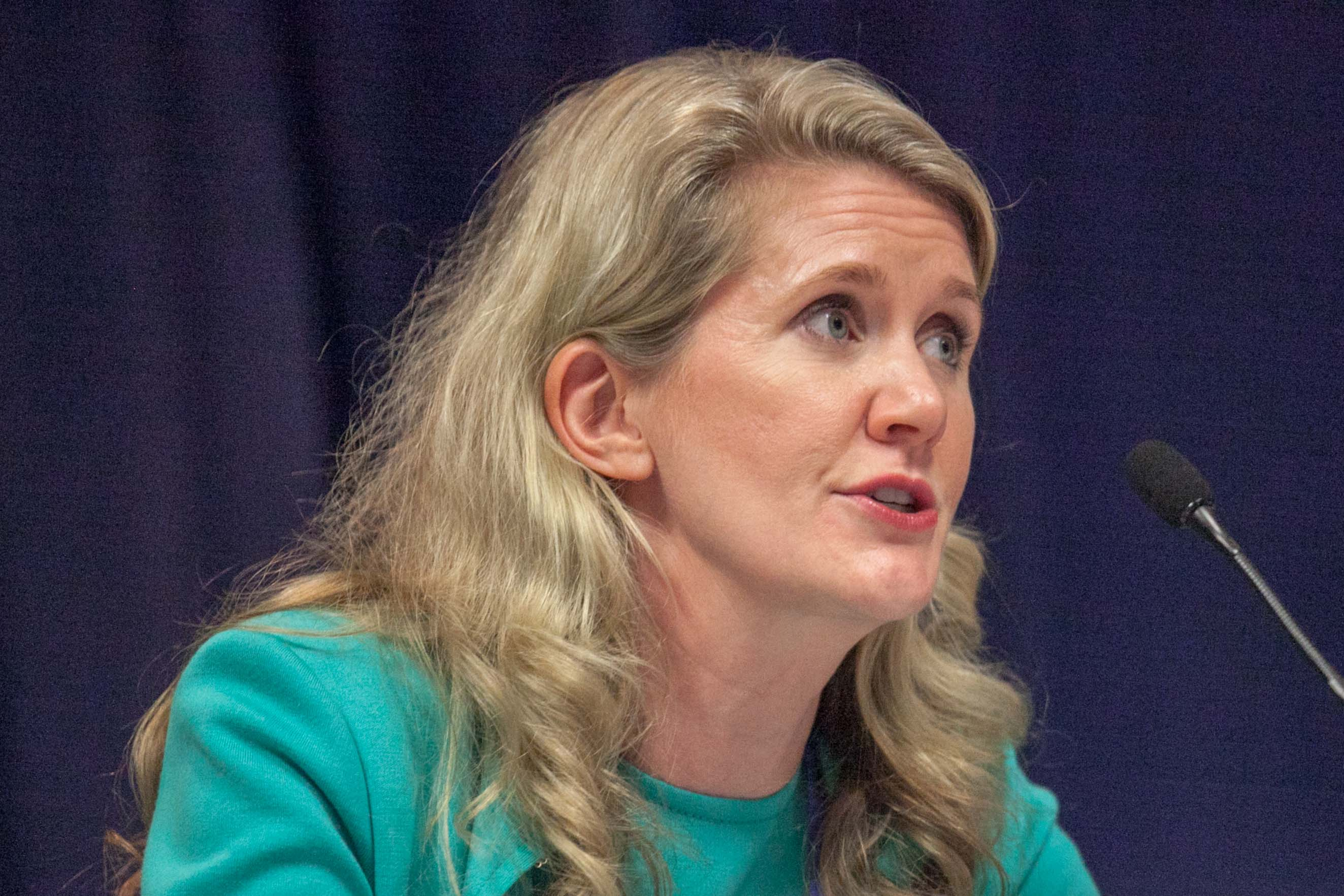
- Swartz in 2015
- Born: Houston
- Education: B.A., University of Virginia; MBA, 1996, Harvard Business School
- Occupation: Group President of Holland America Group (HAG)
- Spouse: Rob Swartz

Jan G. Swartz is an American businesswoman. She is currently the Executive Vice President, Strategic Operations for Carnival Corporation. Previously, she was Group President of Holland America Group, responsible for Princess Cruises, Holland America Line, Seabourn, and P&O Australia, as well as Holland America Princess Alaska Tours and inter-group operations.

== Early life and education ==
Swartz earned her Bachelor of Arts from the University of Virginia and her MBA from Harvard Business School. Growing up in Texas, she was a Girl Guide.

== Career ==
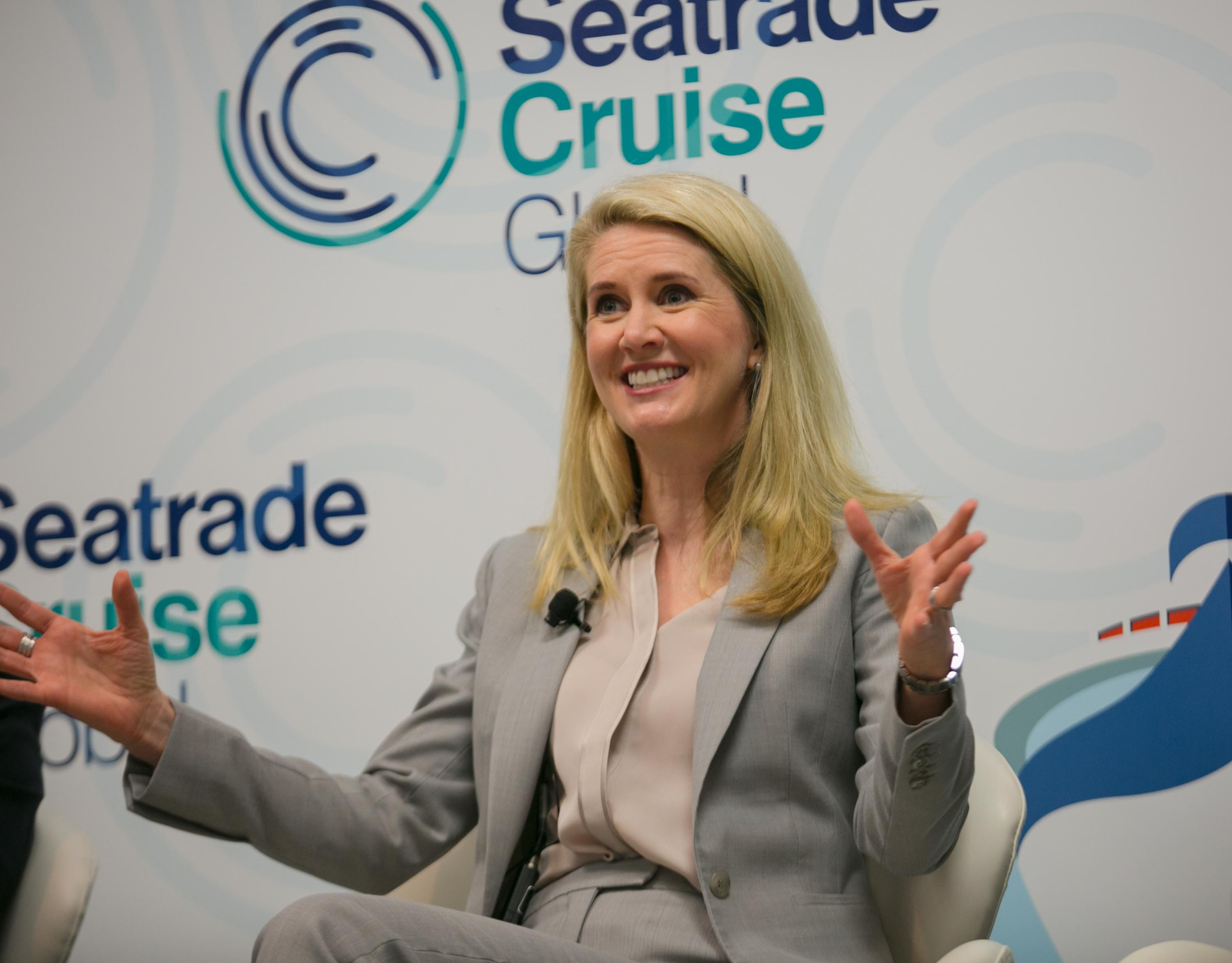
Swartz in 2017

After graduating from Harvard Business School, Swartz and her husband moved to Los Angeles, where she accepted a position with Bain and Company Incorporated. In 1997, she joined Princess Cruises as an outside management consultant. From there, she joined MXG Media in 1999 as Chief Executive Officer, where she oversaw online, catalog, magazine, and television ventures. In 2001, Swartz was appointed the Princess Cruises's vice president of strategy and business development.

From 2008 until 2013, Swartz served as the Executive Vice President of Princess Cruises' Sales, Marketing, and Customer Service. In her last year as Executive Vice President, Swartz was appointed President of Princess Cruises. In 2015, she was named the Girl Scouts of Greater Los Angeles Woman of Distinction.

In 2016, Swartz was promoted to group president of Princess Cruises and Carnival Australia. Two years later, Swartz was appointed to the MGM Resorts International Board of Directors. In December 2020, she was appointed group president of Holland America Group, responsible for Princess Cruises, Holland America Line, Seabourn, and P&O Australia, as well as Holland America Princess Alaska Tours and inter-group operations.

== Personal life ==
Swartz is married to television executive Rob Swartz, and together they have two daughters.
