= Stanley L. Swartz =

American academic

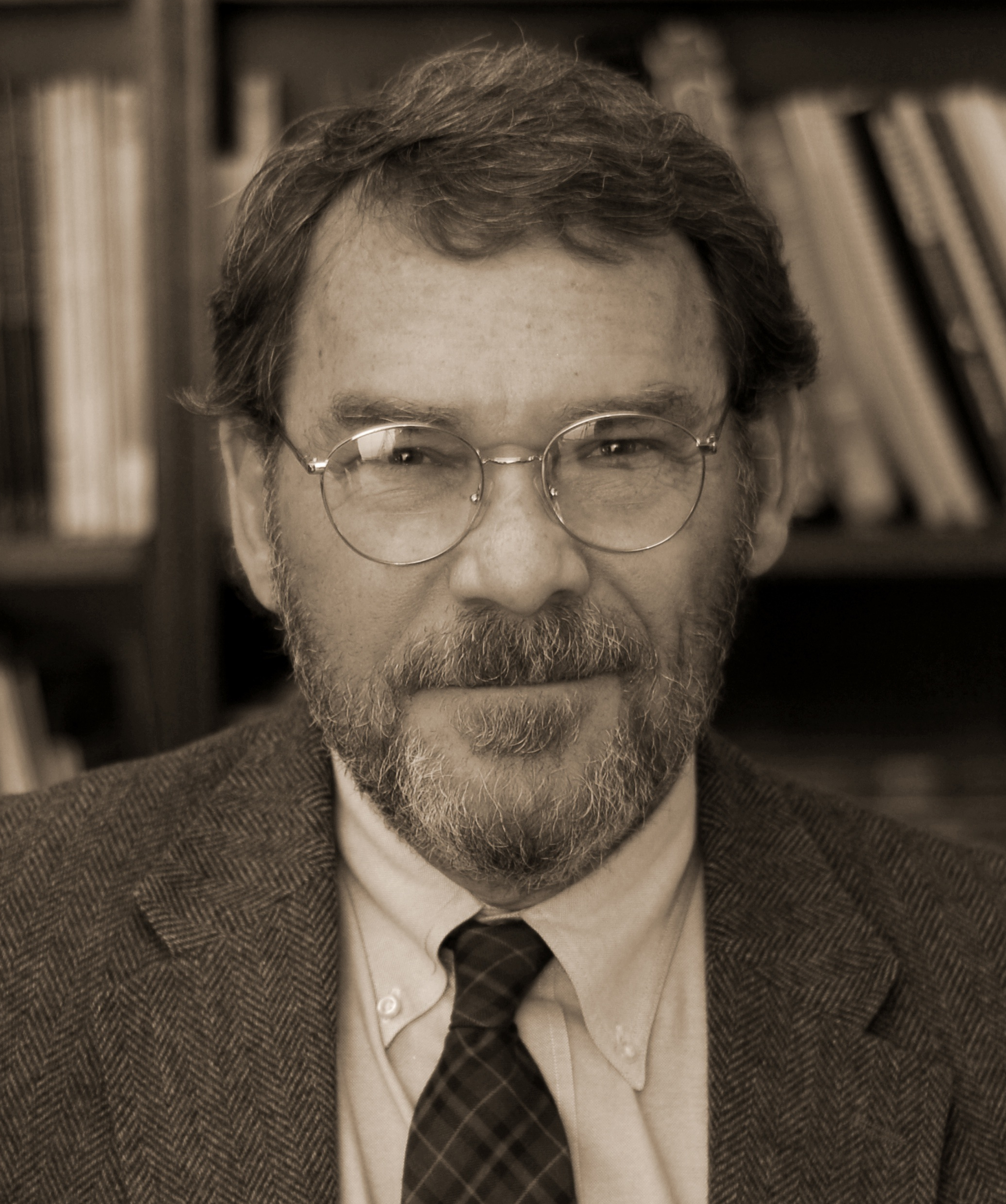
Stanley L Swartz

Stanley L. Swartz is an American academic who is a Professor of Education at California State University, San Bernardino in the Faculties of Special Education and Educational Administration. He is the Director of the Autism Research Group and the Foundation for Comprehensive Early Literacy Learning (CELL).

Swartz's research interests include literacy learning for low achieving children and children with disabilities and treatment and inclusion of children with Autism Spectrum Disorders. He is the author of professional books (in both English and Spanish) for teaching training in literacy and books for children to support reading achievement.

== Education ==
Swartz completed a Bachelor of Arts degree in psychology and philosophy from the University of Findlay where he is also a Distinguished Alumnus. He earned his Master of Education and Doctor of Philosophy degrees from Bowling Green State University.

== International ==
Swartz is Maestro Honorifico in the Faculty of Human Sciences at the Universidad Autónoma de Baja California.

== Publications ==
- Inclusion: Equal Access for Students with Disabilities. (2014). Editorial Sin Fin.
- Response to Intervention (RtI): Intervention and Legal Issues. (2011). Education Law Association.
- Cada nino un lector. (2010). Ediciones Universidad Catolica de Chile.
- Autism/Autismo. (2010). Innovacion Editorial Lagares de Mexico.
- Family Literacy Workshops. (2008). Cavallo Publishing.
- Guided Reading and Literacy Centers. (2003). Pearson Learning/Dominie Press.
- Interactive Writing and Interactive Editing. (2002). Pearson Learning/Dominie Press.
- Shared Reading. (2002). Pearson Learning/Dominie Press.
- Ensenanza Inicial de la Lectura y la Escritura. (2001). Editorial Trillas.
- Research in Reading Recovery. (1997). Heinemann.
