= List of tourist attractions in Taiwan =

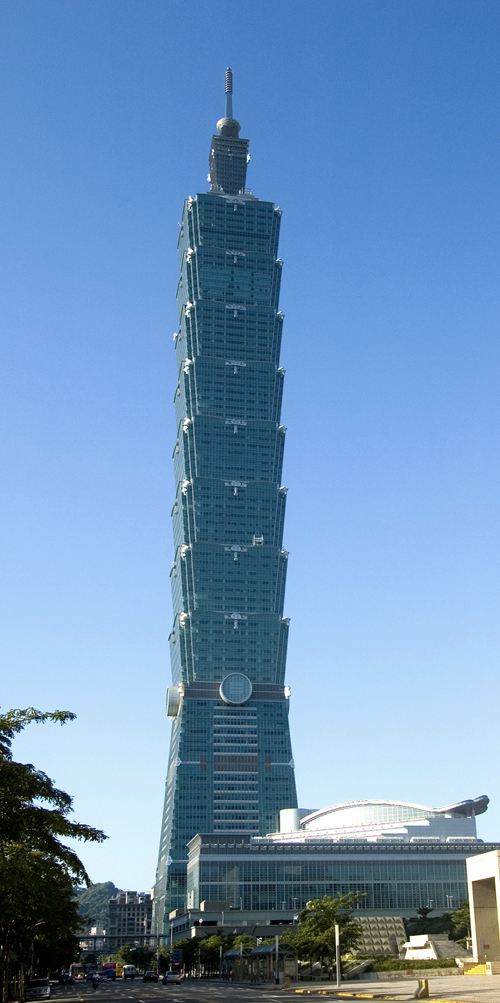
Taipei 101, Taipei

Popular tourist attractions in Taiwan include the following:

== Attractions ==
=== Historical buildings ===
- Beihai Tunnel, Beigan (Chinese: 北海坑道（北竿); pinyin: Běihǎi Kēngdào (běi gān))
- Beihai Tunnel, Nangan (Chinese: 北海坑道（南竿); pinyin: Běihǎi kēngdào (nán gān))
- Bopiliao Historic Block
- Daxi Wude Hall (Chinese: 大溪武德殿; pinyin: Dàxī Wǔdé Diàn)
- Eternal Golden Castle
- First Guesthouse
- Fongyi Tutorial Academy
- Former British Consulate at Takao
- Former Japanese Navy Fongshan Communication Center
- Former Tainan Weather Observatory
- Fort Provintia
- Fort Santo Domingo
- Fort Zeelandia
- Fuxing Barn
- Great South Gate
- Gulongtou Zhenwei Residence
- Hobe Fort
- Jhen Wen Academy
- Kaohsiung Grand Hotel
- Keelung Fort Commander's Official Residence
- Lee Teng-fan's Ancient Residence
- Lin Family Mansion and Garden
- Meinong East Gate Tower
- Moving Castle
- Niumatou Site
- North Gate of Xiong Town
- Presidential Office Building
- Qihou Fort
- Qing Dynasty Taiwan Provincial Administration Hall
- Shihlin Paper Mill
- Taipei Guest House
- Tianma Tea House
- Walls of Taipei
- Wistaria Tea House
- Workshop of Advanced Academy of Agronomy and Forestry
- Wude Martial Arts Center
- Wufeng Lin Family Mansion and Garden
- Yuanshan Grand Hotel
- Yunlin Story House
- Zhongshan Hall

=== Memorials ===
- 228 Peace Memorial Park
- Black Bat Squadron Memorial Hall
- Chen Dexing Ancestral Hall
- Chen Jhong-he Memorial Hall
- Chiang Kai-shek Memorial Hall
- Chin Pao San
- Cihu Mausoleum
- Drop of Water Memorial Hall
- Eternal Spring Shrine
- Gaoshi Shrine
- Green Island Human Rights Culture Park
- Guo Ziyi Memorial Hall
- Jiji Military History Park
- Jing-Mei White Terror Memorial Park
- Kagi Shrine
- Kaohsiung Martyrs' Shrine
- Koxinga Ancestral Shrine
- Liu Clan Shrine
- National Revolutionary Martyrs' Shrine
- Ōgon Shrine
- Shetou Doushan Ancestral Shrine
- Shigong Shrine
- Sun Yat-sen Memorial Hall
- Taichung Martyrs' Shrine
- Taoyuan Martyrs' Shrine
- Tomb of Chen Jhong-he
- Touliao Mausoleum
- Wang Yun-wu Memorial Hall
- Wukou Village Liou Family Ancestral Hall
- Xiaolin Village Memorial Park
- Yang Family Ancestral Hall
- Zhong-Sheng-Gong Memorial

=== Skyscrapers ===
- Shin Kong Life Tower
- Sun-Shooting Tower
- Taipei 101
- Tuntex Sky Tower

=== Public places, squares and art centers ===
- Chiayi Performing Arts Center
- Chung Hsing Cultural and Creative Park
- Dadong Arts Center
- Hongmaogang Cultural Park
- Hsinchu City Art Site of Railway Warehouse
- Huashan 1914 Creative Park
- Liberty Square
- Li Mei-shu Memorial Gallery
- Lukang Artist Village
- National Center for Traditional Arts
- National Changhua Living Art Center
- National Hsinchu Living Arts Center
- Pier-2 Art Center
- Songshan Cultural and Creative Park
- Taichung City Tun District Art Center
- Taichung Cultural and Creative Industries Park
- Tainan Cultural and Creative Park
- Taipei Expo Park
- Taoyuan Arts Center
- Xikou Township Cultural Life Center
- Yuanlin Performance Hall
- Zhecheng Cultural Park
- Zhongli Arts Hall

=== Temples ===
- Changfu Temple
- Chaotian Temple
- Chung Tai Chan Monastery
- Dharma Drum Mountain
- Fo Guang Shan Monastery
- Great Queen of Heaven Temple
- Guandu Temple
- Linji Huguo Chan Temple
- Nung Chan Monastery
- Shandao Temple
- State Temple of the Martial God
- Xingtian Temple

=== Pagodas ===
- Ci En Pagoda
- Dragon and Tiger Pagodas
- Maoshan Pagoda
- Spring and Autumn Pavilions
- Wentai Pagoda

=== Churches ===
- High-Heel Wedding Church
- Holy Rosary Cathedral
- Luce Memorial Chapel

=== Mosques ===
- An-Nur Tongkang Mosque
- At-Taqwa Mosque
- Kaohsiung Mosque
- Longgang Mosque
- Taichung Mosque
- Tainan Mosque
- Taipei Cultural Mosque
- Taipei Grand Mosque

=== Museums ===
- 228 Memorial Museum
- 921 Earthquake Museum of Taiwan
- Arwin Charisma Museum Tourist Factory
- Assembly Affairs Museum of the Legislative Yuan
- August 23 Artillery Battle Museum
- Beitou Hot Spring Museum
- Beitou Museum
- Beitou Plum Garden
- Beneficial Microbes Museum and Tourism Factory
- Bo Yang Museum
- BRAND'S Health Museum
- Bunun Cultural Museum
- Changhua Arts Museum
- Chelungpu Fault Preservation Park
- Chengkungling History Museum
- Chi Mei Museum
- Chiayi Municipal Museum
- Chihsing Tan Katsuo Museum
- Chinese Furniture Museum
- Chung Li-he Museum
- Chunghwa Postal Museum
- Cijin Shell Museum
- Coca-Cola Museum
- Coral Museum
- Culture Museum of Sikou Township Office
- Evergreen Maritime Museum
- Fangyuan Museum of Arts
- Fire Safety Museum of Taipei City Fire Department
- Fo Guang Shan Buddha Museum
- Former Residence of Zhang Xueliang
- Formosa Plastics Group Museum
- Furniture Manufacturing Eco-Museum in Tainan
- Glass Museum of Hsinchu City
- Gold Museum
- Guningtou War Museum
- Honey Museum
- Hsinchu City Fire Museum
- Hualien County Stone Sculptural Museum
- Huoyan Mountain Ecology Museum
- Image Museum of Hsinchu City
- Jiasian Petrified Fossil Museum
- Ju Ming Museum
- Kaohsiung Astronomical Museum
- Kaohsiung Hakka Cultural Museum
- Kaohsiung Harbor Museum
- Kaohsiung Museum of Fine Arts
- Kaohsiung Museum of History
- Kaohsiung Museum of Labor
- Kuo Yuan Ye Museum of Cake and Pastry
- Lanyang Museum
- Li Tien-lu Hand Puppet Historical Museum
- Liu Hsing-chin Comic Museum
- Lukang Folk Arts Museum
- Mei-hwa Spinning Top Museum
- Meinong Hakka Culture Museum
- Miaoli Pottery Museum
- Miaoli Railway Museum
- Miniatures Museum of Taiwan
- Muh Sheng Museum of Entomology
- Museum of Anthropology
- Museum of Archives
- Museum of Contemporary Arts Taipei
- Museum of Drinking Water
- Museum of Medical Humanities
- Museum of Saisiat Folklore
- Museum of World Religions
- Museum of Zoology
- National Cheng Kung University Museum
- National Museum of History
- National Museum of Marine Biology and Aquarium
- National Museum of Natural Science
- National Museum of Prehistory
- National Museum of Taiwan History
- National Museum of Taiwan Literature
- National Palace Museum
- National Radio Museum
- National Railway Museum
- National Science and Technology Museum
- National Taiwan Museum
- National Taiwan Museum of Comics
- National Taiwan Museum of Fine Arts
- New Taipei City Hakka Museum
- New Taipei City Yingge Ceramics Museum
- Penghu Living Museum
- Ping Huang Coffee Museum
- Ping-Lin Tea Museum
- Pingtung Art Museum
- Republic of China Air Force Museum
- Republic of China Armed Forces Museum
- Republic of China Presidential Museum
- Rueylong Museum
- Sanyi Wood Sculpture Museum
- Shihsanhang Museum of Archaeology
- Shilin Official Residence
- Shung Ye Museum of Formosan Aborigines
- Soy Sauce Brewing Museum
- Soya-Mixed Meat Museum
- Spring Onion Culture Museum
- Suho Memorial Paper Museum
- Taichung English and Art Museum
- Taipei Astronomical Museum
- Taipei City Museum
- Taipei Fine Arts Museum
- Taipei Story House
- Taitung Art Museum
- Taiwan Balloons Museum
- Taiwan Coal Mine Museum
- Taiwan Design Museum
- Taiwan Hinoki Museum
- Taiwan Land Reform Museum
- Taiwan Metal Creative Museum
- Taiwan Mochi Museum
- Taiwan Nougat Museum
- Taiwan Salt Museum
- Taiwan Sugar Museum (Kaohsiung)
- Taiwan Sugar Museum (Tainan)
- Taiwan Theater Museum
- Taiwan Times Village
- Takao Railway Museum
- Tamkang University Maritime Museum
- Teng Feng Fish Ball Museum
- Tittot Glass Art Museum
- World Police Museum
- Wulai Atayal Museum
- Wulai Tram Museum
- Yilan Distillery Chia Chi Lan Wine Museum
- YM Museum of Marine Exploration Kaohsiung
- YM Oceanic Culture and Art Museum
- Yu Da Wei Xian Sheng Memorial Museum
- Yunlin Hand Puppet Museum
- Zaochiao Charcoal Museum

=== Tourist towns ===
- Anping, Tainan City
- Caoling, Yunlin County
- Dajia, Taichung City
- Daxi, Taoyuan City
- Houtong Cat Village, New Taipei City
- Jiaoxi, Yilan County
- Jinguashi, New Taipei City
- Jiji, Nantou County
- Jincheng Township, Kinmen County
- Jiufen, New Taipei City
- Lukang, Changhua County
- Meinong, Kaohsiung City
- Tamsui, New Taipei City

=== Night markets ===
- Caotun Night Market
- Fengjia Night Market
- Jin-Zuan Night Market
- Kaisyuan Night Market
- Lehua Night Market
- Liuhe Night Market
- Luodong Night Market
- Nanya Night Market
- Raohe Street Night Market
- Ruifeng Night Market
- Shilin Night Market
- Snake Alley
- Tainan Flower Night Market
- Wenhua Road Night Market
- Zhonghua Street Night Market

=== Streets ===
- Central Street
- Danshui Old Street
- Daxi Old Street
- Dihua Street
- Mofan Street
- Sanfong Central Street
- Toucheng Old Street
- Yizhong Street

=== Natural scenery and forest ===
- Alishan National Scenic Area
- Bitan
- Cape Eluanbi
- Cape Santiago (Taiwan)
- Dakeng
- Double-Heart of Stacked Stones
- Gaomei Wetlands
- Jhihben National Forest Recreation Area
- Little Taiwan
- Maokong
- Penghu National Scenic Area
- Sansiantai
- Sihcao Wetlands
- Siraya National Scenic Area
- Taiwan Southernmost Point
- Whale Cave
- Yehliu Geopark

=== Lakes and reservoirs ===
- Changpi Lake
- Chengcing Lake
- Cueifong Lake
- Gugang Lake
- Lantan Lake
- Liyu Lake
- Longtan Lake
- Lotus Pond
- Meihua Lake
- Milk Lake
- Sun Moon Lake
- Wusanto Reservoir
- Zhongzheng Lake

=== Mountains and cliffs ===
- Chingshui Cliff
- Luye Highlands
- Mount Banping
- Mount Dabajian
- Mount Guanyin
- Mount Hehuan
- Mount Pingfeng
- Mount Qixing
- Mount Shou
- Mount Yangming
- Mount Yu

=== National parks ===
- Kenting National Park
- Kinmen National Park
- Shei-Pa National Park
- South Penghu Marine National Park
- Southwest Coast National Scenic Area
- Taijiang National Park
- Taroko National Park
- Yangmingshan National Park
- Yushan National Park

=== City parks and gardens ===
- Beinan Cultural Park
- Bihu Park
- Changhua Fitzroy Gardens
- Chengmei Riverside Park
- Chiayi Park
- Cijin Wind Turbine Park
- Daan Forest Park
- Dahu Park
- Dajia Riverside Park
- Dapingding Tropical Botanical Garden
- Dongshan River Water Park
- Erlun Sports Park
- Guanshan Riverside Park
- Guanshan Waterfront Park
- Ho Ping Island Hi Park
- Kaohsiung Metropolitan Park
- Kaohsiung Park
- Meiti Riverside Park
- Nanhu Riverside Park
- Nanxing Park
- Rongxing Garden Park
- Sanmin Park
- Shaochuantou Park
- Shuangxi Park and Chinese Garden
- Taichung Park
- Taipei Botanical Garden
- Taitung Forest Park
- Water Tower Park
- Weiwuying Metropolitan Park
- Wu Feng Park
- Wulaokeng Scenic Area
- Xinzhong Park
- Yingfeng Riverside Park

=== Rivers ===
- Fengshan River
- Keelung River
- Love River
- Tamsui River
- Xiuguluan River

=== Waterfalls ===
- Jiao Lung Waterfall
- Shifen Waterfall
- Wulai Waterfall

=== Beaches ===
- Baisha Bay
- Qixingtan Beach
- Fulong Beach
- Neipi Beach
- South Bay
- Yanliao Beach Park

=== Harbors, wharf and piers ===
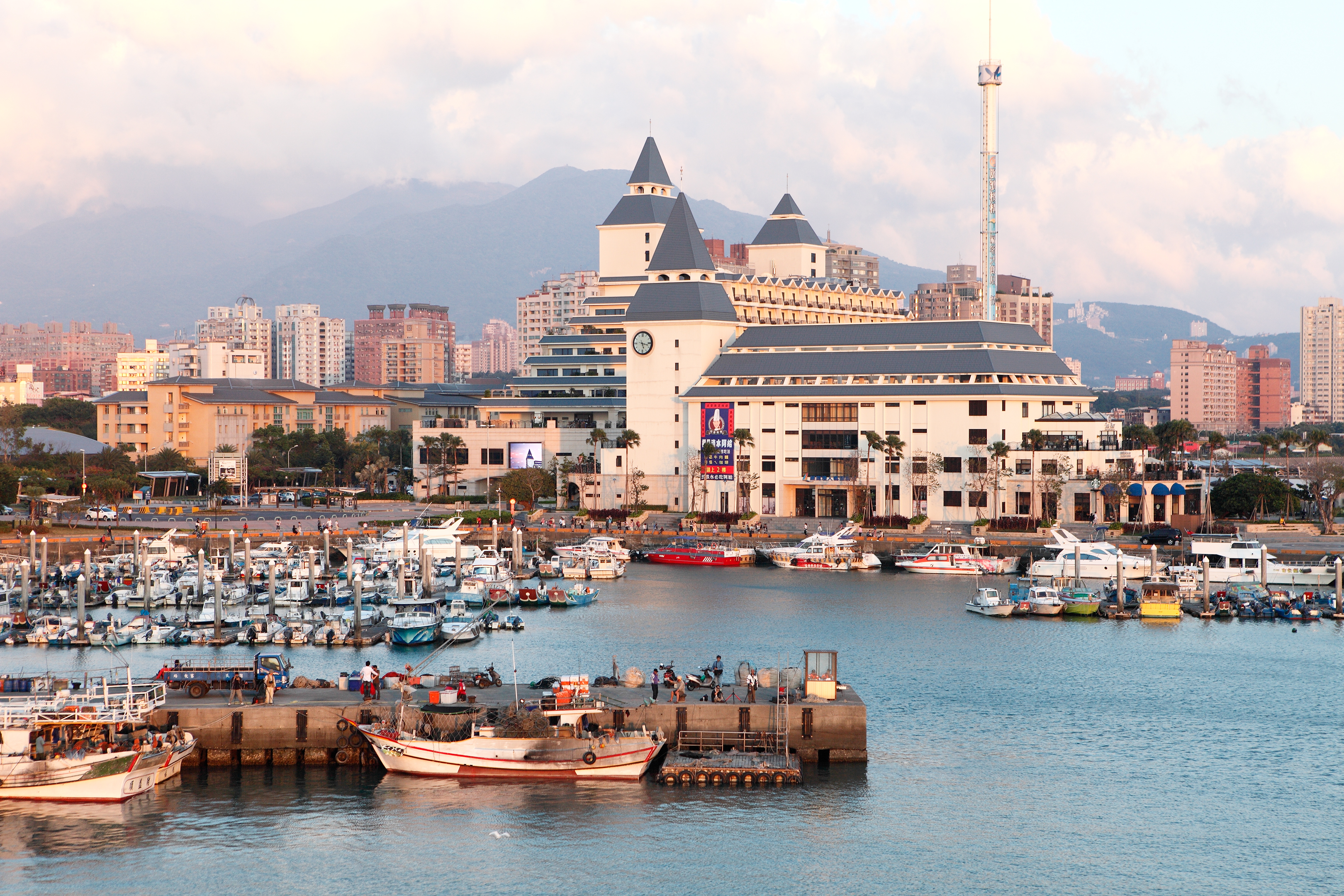
Tamsui Fisherman's Wharf

- Badouzi Fish Harbor
- Fugang Fishery Harbor
- Haishan Fishing Port
- Kaohsiung Fisherman's Wharf
- Love Pier
- Shen-ao Fishing Harbor
- Tamsui Fisherman's Wharf
- Wanggong Fishing Port
- Wuci Fishery Harbor
- Zhuwei Fish Harbor

=== Hot and cold springs ===
- Beitou Hot Spring
- Guanziling Hot Spring
- Jhiben Hot Spring
- Jiaoxi Hot Spring
- Su-ao Cold Spring
- Tai-an Hot Spring

=== Islands and islets ===
- Green Island
- Jiangong Islet
- Kinmen Islands
- Lalu Island
- Lamay Island
- Matsu Islands
- Orchid Island
- Penghu Islands

=== Leisure resorts ===
- Atayal Resort
- Bunun Tribal Leisure Farm
- Flying Cow Ranch
- Green World Ecological Farm
- Jianshanpi Jiangnan Resort
- Kentington Resort
- Ming Shan Resort
- Qingjing Farm
- Shangri-La Leisure Farm
- Toucheng Leisure Farm
- Yun Hsien Resort

=== Cultural centers ===
- Amis Folk Center
- Dongshih Hakka Cultural Park
- Hakka Round House
- Hongmaogang Cultural Park
- Kaohsiung Cultural Center
- Keelung Cultural Center
- Ketagalan Culture Center
- Mongolian and Tibetan Cultural Center
- Taichung City Dadun Cultural Center
- Tainan Municipal Cultural Center
- Taipei Cultural Center
- Taipei Hakka Culture Hall
- Taoyuan Hakka Culture Hall
- Wu Zhuo-liu Art and Cultural Hall
- Xinying Cultural Center

=== Theme parks ===
- Bada Forest Theme Paradise
- Dalukung Land
- E-DA Theme Park
- Fantasy World
- Formosa Fun Coast
- Formosan Aboriginal Culture Village
- Hou Yen Shan Hot Spring Area
- Hsinchu Maple in the Spring Corp
- Janfusun Fancyworld
- Landmine Theme Park
- Leofoo Village Theme Park
- Lihpao Land
- Little Ding-Dong Science Theme Park
- Otherworld
- Shan Gri La Paradise
- SKM Park
- Sun-Link-Sea Forest and Nature Resort
- Taipei Children's Amusement Park
- Taipei Water Park
- Taiwan Studio City
- Wan Ruey Forest Paradise
- West Lake Resortopia
- Window on World Theme Park
- Yamay

=== Zoos and aquariums ===
- Farglory Ocean Park
- Fonghuanggu Bird and Ecology Park
- Hsinchu Zoo
- Shou Shan Zoo
- Taipei Zoo
- Wanpi World Safari Zoo
- Yehliu Ocean World
- Taichung Aquarium
- Penghu Aquarium
- Xpark

=== Shopping districts ===
- Urban Spotlight Arcade
- Ximending

=== Shopping centers ===
- Breeze Center
- Dream Mall
- Guang Hua Digital Plaza
- Hayashi Department Store
- Miramar Entertainment Park
- Mitsui Outlet Park Tainan
- Taipei 101 Mall
- Taipei Fish Market
- Taipei Underground Market
- Zhongshan Metro Mall

=== Educational centers ===
- Discovery Center of Taipei
- National Taiwan Arts Education Center
- National Taiwan Science Education Center
- Taipower Exhibit Center in Southern Taiwan

=== Libraries ===
- Changhua City Library
- Kaohsiung Main Public Library
- National Central Library
- National Library of Public Information
- National Taiwan Library
- Taipei Public Library Beitou Branch

=== Convention centers ===
- Greater Taichung International Expo Center
- ICC Tainan
- International Convention Center Kaohsiung
- Kaohsiung Exhibition Center
- New Taipei City Exhibition Hall
- Taipei International Convention Center
- Taipei World Trade Center
- Taipei Nangang Exhibition Center
- Taoyuan Convention and Exhibition Center
- World Trade Center Taichung

=== Halls and theaters ===
- Guling Street Avant-garde Theatre
- Kaohsiung City Music Hall
- Kaohsiung Film Archive
- National Theater and Concert Hall
- Red House Theater
- Taipei Film House
- Wellspring Theater
- Xiluo Theater

=== Stadiums ===
- Chung Cheng Martial Arts Stadium
- Fengshan Stadium
- Kaohsiung Arena
- Kaohsiung National Stadium
- Taipei Arena
- Taipei Dome
- Taipei Municipal Stadium
- Taiwan Provincial Stadium
- Taoyuan Arena
- Yunlin Indoor Arena

=== Transportations ===
- Bisha Fishing Port
- Great Harbor Bridge
- New Taipei Bridge
- Qishan Train Station
- Shengxing Station
- Singuang Ferry Wharf
- Wulai Scenic Train
- Xiluo Bridge

== Attractions by region ==
- List of tourist attractions in Taipei

== Former attractions ==
- Children's Museum of Taipei
- Chinese Culture and Movie Center
- Chung Cheng Aviation Museum
- Sanzhi UFO houses
- Baihe Taiwan Film and TV Town

== Festivals ==
- Baishatun Mazu Pilgrimage
- Beigang International Music Festival
- Formoz Festival
- Hohaiyan Rock Festival
- Qing Shan King Sacrificial Ceremony
- Taipei Film Festival
- Taiwan Lantern Festival
- Women Make Waves
- Yilan International Children's Folklore and Folkgame Festival

== See also ==
- Taiwan
  - National parks of Taiwan
