= List of museums in Taiwan =

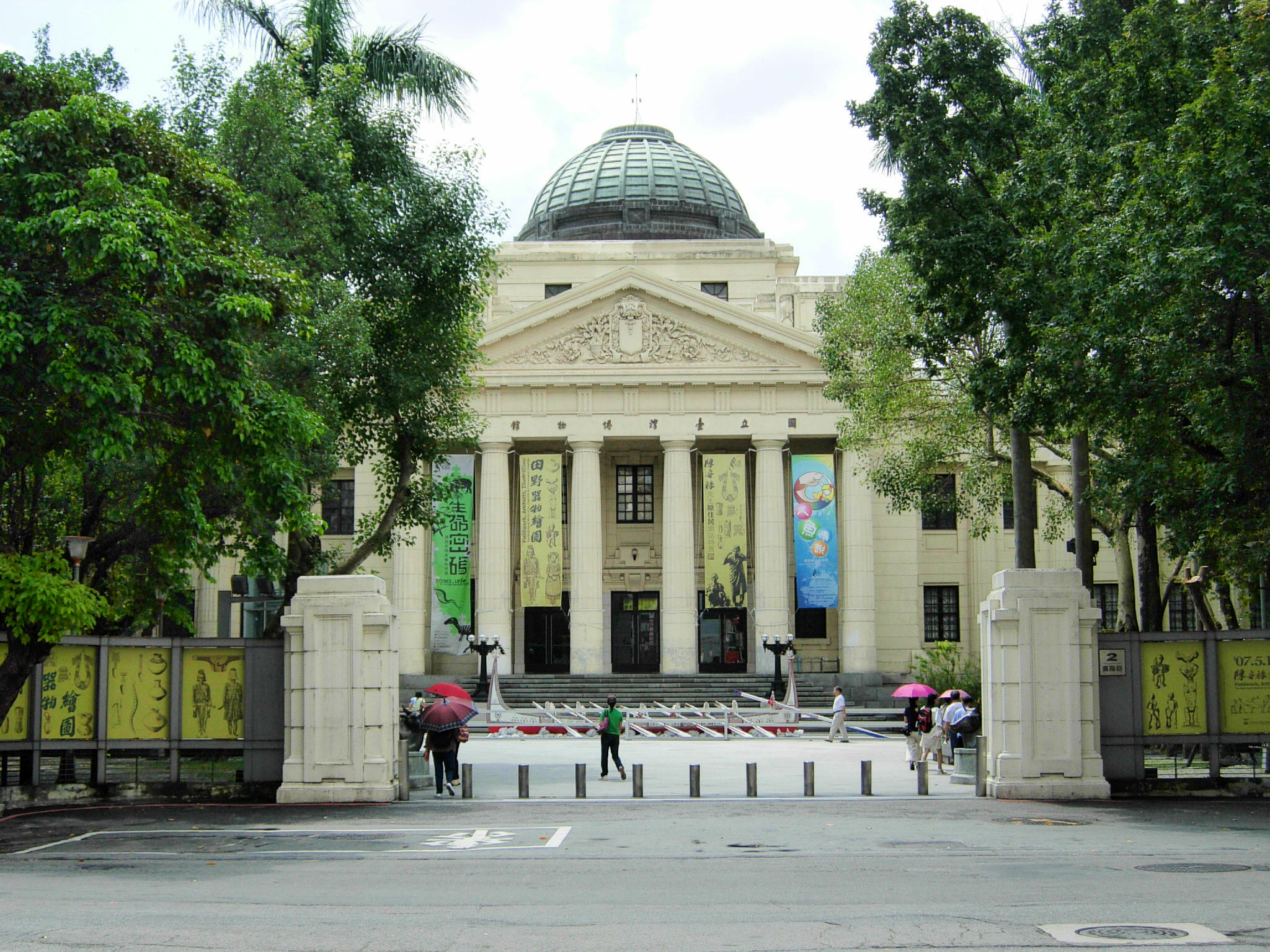
National Taiwan Museum in Taipei, Taiwan's oldest museum, built in 1908

This is a list of museums in Taiwan, including cultural centers and arts centres.

== Kinmen County ==
- August 23 Artillery Battle Museum
- Guningtou Battle Museum
- Hujingtou Battle Museum
- Kinmen Ceramics Museum
- Landmine Museum
- Lieyu Township Culture Museum
- Yu Da Wei Xian Sheng Memorial Museum

== Lienchiang County ==
- Matsu Blue Tears Ecological Museum
- Matsu Folk Culture Museum

== Kaohsiung City ==
- Chung Li-he Museum
- Cijin Shell Museum
- Fongshan Community Culture Museum
- Former British Consulate at Takao
- Hamasen Museum of Taiwan Railway
- Jiasian Petrified Fossil Museum
- Kaohsiung Astronomical Museum
- Kaohsiung Hakka Cultural Museum
- Kaohsiung Harbor Museum
- Kaohsiung Museum of Fine Arts
- Kaohsiung Museum of Fisheries Civilization
- Kaohsiung Museum of History
- Kaohsiung Museum of Labor
- Kaohsiung Vision Museum
- Meinong Hakka Culture Museum
- National Science and Technology Museum
- Republic of China Air Force Museum
- Soya-Mixed Meat Museum
- Taiwan Pineapple Museum
- Taiwan Sugar Museum
- Takao Railway Museum
- Xiaolin Pingpu Cultural Museum
- YM Museum of Marine Exploration Kaohsiung
- War and Peace Memorial Park and Theme Hall

== New Taipei City ==
- Fort Santo Domingo
- Jingtong Mining Industry Museum
- Ju Ming Museum
- Li Tien-lu Hand Puppet Historical Museum
- Museum of World Religions
- National Human Rights Museum (Jing-Mei White Terror Memorial Park)
- New Taipei City Gold Museum
- New Taipei City Hakka Museum
- New Taipei City Yingge Ceramics Museum
- Ping-Lin Tea Museum
- Sanxia History Museum
- Shihsanhang Museum of Archaeology
- Taiwan Coal Mine Museum
- Taiwan Nougat Creativity Museum
- Tamkang University Maritime Museum
- Tamsui Historical Museum
- Teng Feng Fish Ball Museum
- Wulai Atayal Museum
- Wulai Forestry Life Museum

== Taichung City ==
- 921 Earthquake Museum of Taiwan
- Asia Museum of Modern Art
- Assembly Affairs Museum, The Legislative Yuan
- Chang Hwa Bank Headquarters and Museum
- Chang Lien-cheng Saxophone Museum
- Chengkungling History Museum
- Democratic Times Museum
- Fengyuan Museum of Lacquer Art
- Lin Hsien-tang Residence Museum
- Ling Tung Numismatic Museum
- Lishan Culture Museum
- Museum of Fiber Arts, Taichung
- National Museum of Natural Science
- National Taiwan Museum of Comics
- National Taiwan Museum of Fine Arts
- Taichung Literature Museum
- Taichung Military Kindred Village Museum
- Taiwan Balloons Museum
- Tuniu Hakka Cultural Museum

== Tainan City ==
- Bo Yang Museum
- Canal Museum
- Chimei Museum
- Fangyuan Museum of Arts
- Fort Zeelandia Museum
- Furniture Manufacturing Eco Museum in Tainan
- Liu Chi-hsiang Art Gallery and Memorial Hall
- Luerhmen History and Culture Museum
- Museum of Archaeology, Tainan Branch of National Museum of Prehistory
- National Cheng Kung University Museum
- National Museum of Taiwan History
- National Museum of Taiwan Literature
- Tainan Art Museum
- Tainan Children's Science Museum
- Tainan Shan-Shang Garden and Old Waterworks Museum
- Taiwan Development Historical Materials Wax Museum
- Tainan Judicial Museum
- Taiwan Metal Creation Museum
- Taiwan Salt Museum
- Taiwan Sugar Museum
- Yang Kui Literature Memorial Museum
- Ye Wang cochin ware cultural museum

== Taipei City ==
- Ama Museum
- Aurora Art Museum
- Beitou Hot Spring Museum
- Beitou Museum
- Beitou Plum Garden
- Chang Foundation Museum
- Cheng Nan-jung Liberty Museum
- Chiang Kai-shek Memorial Hall
- Children's Art Museum in Taipei
- Chunghwa Postal Museum
- Customs Museum
- Evergreen Maritime Museum
- Fire Safety Museum of Taipei City Fire Department
- Fubon Art Museum
- Hong-Gah Museum
- Hwa Kang Museum
- Insect Science Museum
- Jut Art Museum
- Kuandu Museum of Fine Arts
- Kuo Yuan Ye Museum of Cake and Pastry
- Land Reform Museum
- Lin An Tai Historical House and Museum
- Lingnan Fine Arts Museum
- Miniatures Museum of Taiwan
- Museum of Anthropology
- Museum of Contemporary Art Taipei
- Museum of Drinking Water
- Museum of Jade Art
- Museum of Medical Humanities
- Museum of Zoology
- National 228 Memorial Museum
- National Museum of History
- National Palace Museum
- National Taiwan Museum
- National Taiwan University Archives
- Presidential and Vice-Presidential Artifacts Museum
- Republic of China Armed Forces Museum
- Shung Ye Museum of Formosan Aborigines
- Suho Memorial Paper Museum
- Sun Yat-sen Memorial Hall
- Sun Yun-suan Memorial Museum
- Taipei 228 Memorial Museum
- Taipei Astronomical Museum
- Taipei City Museum
- Taipei Fine Arts Museum
- Taipei Story House
- Taiwan Design Museum
- Taiwan Stock Museum
- Tittot Glass Art Museum
- Zhongshan Hall

== Changhua County ==
- BRAND'S Health Museum
- Changhua County Art Museum
- Lukang Folk Arts Museum

== Chiayi City ==
- Chiayi Art Museum
- Chiayi Municipal Museum
- Chiayi Prison Museum
- Museum of Old Taiwan Tiles
- Taiwan Hinoki Museum

== Chiayi County ==
- 1913 Antique Office of Alishan House-Local Cultural Building
- Alishan Museum
- Mei-Ling Fine Arts Museum
- National Radio Museum
- Ping Huang Coffee Museum
- Southern Branch of the National Palace Museum

== Hsinchu City ==
- Aqueduct Museum of Hsinchu City
- Black Bat Squadron Memorial Hall
- Glass Museum of Hsinchu City
- Hsinchu City Fire Museum
- Hsinchu Museum of Military Dependents Village
- Image Museum of Hsinchu City
- Museum of National Chiao Tung University

== Hsinchu County ==
- Liu Hsing-chin Comic Museum
- Rueylong Museum

== Hualien County ==
- Chihsing Tan Katsuo Museum
- Hualien County Stone Sculptural Museum

== Keelung City ==
- National Museum of Marine Science and Technology
- YM Oceanic Culture and Art Museum

== Miaoli County ==
- Huoyan Mountain Ecology Museum
- Miaoli Ceramics Museum
- Miaoli Railway Museum
- Museum of Saisiyat Folklore
- Sanyi Wood Sculpture Museum
- Shengxing Station
- Taiwan Oil Field Exhibition Hall
- Zaochiao Charcoal Museum

== Nantou County ==
- Muh Sheng Museum of Entomology
- Taiwan Mochi Museum
- Taiwan Times Village
- Yu-hsiu Museum of Art

== Penghu County ==
- Chang Yu-sheng Memorial Museum
- Chuwan Crab Museum
- Ocean Resources Museum
- Penghu Living Museum

== Pingtung County ==
- Museum of Traditional Theater
- National Museum of Marine Biology and Aquarium
- Pingtung Art Museum
- Pingtung Hakka Cultural Museum
- King Boat Cultural Museum

== Taitung County ==
- Bunun Cultural Museum
- Lanyu Flying Fish Cultural Museum
- National Human Rights Museum (Green Island White Terror Memorial Park)
- National Museum of Prehistory
- Rice Village Museum
- Taitung Art Museum
- Taitung County Museum of Natural History
- Taitung Story Museum
- Wu Tao Chishang Lunch Box Cultural History Museum

== Yilan County ==
- Atayal Life Museum
- Beneficial Microbes Museum and Tourism Factory
- Coral Museum
- Lanyang Museum
- Lee Rong-chun Literary Museum
- National Center for Traditional Arts
- Spring Onion Culture Museum
- Taiwan Bowl & Dish Museum
- Taiwan Theater Museum
- Yilan Distillery Chia Chi Lan Wine Museum
- Yilan Literary Museum
- Yilan Story Museum
- Zhu Dayu Culture Museum

== Yunlin County ==
- Farming and Irrigation Artifacts Museum
- Honey Museum
- Soy Sauce Brewing Museum
- Yunlin Hand Puppet Museum
- Yunlin Story House

== Taoyuan City ==
- Action Museum
- Arwin Charisma Museum
- Chinese Furniture Museum
- Chung Cheng Aviation Museum
- Coca-Cola Museum
- Formosa Plastics Group Museum
- HeySong Beverage Museum
- Kuo Yuan Ye Museum of Cake and Pastry
- Mei-hwa Spinning Top Museum
- Republic of Chocolate
- Taiwan High Speed Rail Museum
- Taoyuan Museum of Fine Arts
- World Police Museum

== Closed museums ==
- Children's Museum of Taipei
- Chung Cheng Aviation Museum
- Taiyuan Asian Puppet Theatre Museum

== See also ==
- Taiwan Museum Association
- Culture of Taiwan
- List of museums
- List of tourist attractions in Taiwan
- Tourism in Taiwan
