= CMOT =

CMOT can be the initials of:

- Children's Museum of Taipei, a former museum in Taipei, Taiwan
- Common management information protocol over TCP/IP, an architecture for managing a network remotely
- Computational and Mathematical Organization Theory, an academic journal
- Cut-Me-Own-Throat Dibbler, a Discworld character
