= Lanyu Flying Fish Cultural Museum =

Museum in Lanyu, Taitung County, Taiwan

- 蘭嶼飛魚文化會館
- Established: 2005
- Location: Lanyu, Taitung County, Taiwan
- Coordinates: 22°01′33″N 121°32′18″E
- Type: museum
- Website: www.lanan.org.tw

The Lanyu Flying Fish Cultural Museum (traditional Chinese: 蘭嶼飛魚文化會館; simplified Chinese: 兰屿飞鱼文化会馆; pinyin: Lányǔ Fēiyú Wénhuà Huìguǎn) is a museum in Lanyu Township, Taitung County, Taiwan. The museum is located at the Lan En Cultural and Educational Foundation office.

== History ==
With the support from the Council for Cultural Affairs, the museum was established in 2005.

== Exhibitions ==
The museum has the following exhibits:

- Lanyu Artifact Hall
- Traditional Lanyu Houses

== Activities ==
Besides preserving the heritage of the local culture, the museum also promotes the unique Flying Fish Festival as the theme of tourism to create more jobs. It also runs courses such as wood sculpture, fabric weaving and tour guide for the local people. The museum sponsors basketball, Taiwanese chess and traditional singing contests to promote the relationship among the residents.

== Transportation ==
The museum is within walking distance east from Lanyu Airport.

== See also ==
- List of museums in Taiwan
