= 1913 Antique Office of Alishan House-Local Cultural Building =

Museum in Alishan, Chiayi County, Taiwan

- 1913阿里山舊事所地方文化館
- Established: 15 August 2018
- Location: Alishan, Chiayi County, Taiwan
- Type: museum

The 1913 Antique Office of Alishan House-Local Cultural Building (traditional Chinese: 1913阿里山舊事所地方文化館; simplified Chinese: 1913阿里山旧事所地方文化馆; pinyin: 1913 Ālǐshān Jiùshì Suǒ Dìfāng Wénhuàguǎn) is a museum in Alishan National Scenic Area, Alishan Township, Chiayi County, Taiwan.

== History ==
The site where the museum stands today used to be a club for the forestry agency employees during the Japanese rule of Taiwan which was constructed in 1913 in a three building complex. A fire engulfed the two buildings, which left only one building until today. After the handover of Taiwan from Japan to the Republic of China, the building was used as a guest house. On 15 August 2018, the building was reopened as a museum named 1913 Antique Office of Alishan House-Local Cultural Building.

== Architecture ==
Located at an elevation of 2,200 meters above sea level, the museum is the highest museum in Taiwan. It is part of Alishan House, a historic hotel in the area. The building was designed with Taiwan Cypress design.

== Exhibitions ==
The museum exhibits the history, culture, education and arts of Alishan.

== See also ==
- List of museums in Taiwan
