= Meinong Hakka Culture Museum =

Museum in Meinong, Kaohsiung, Taiwan

- 美濃客家文物館
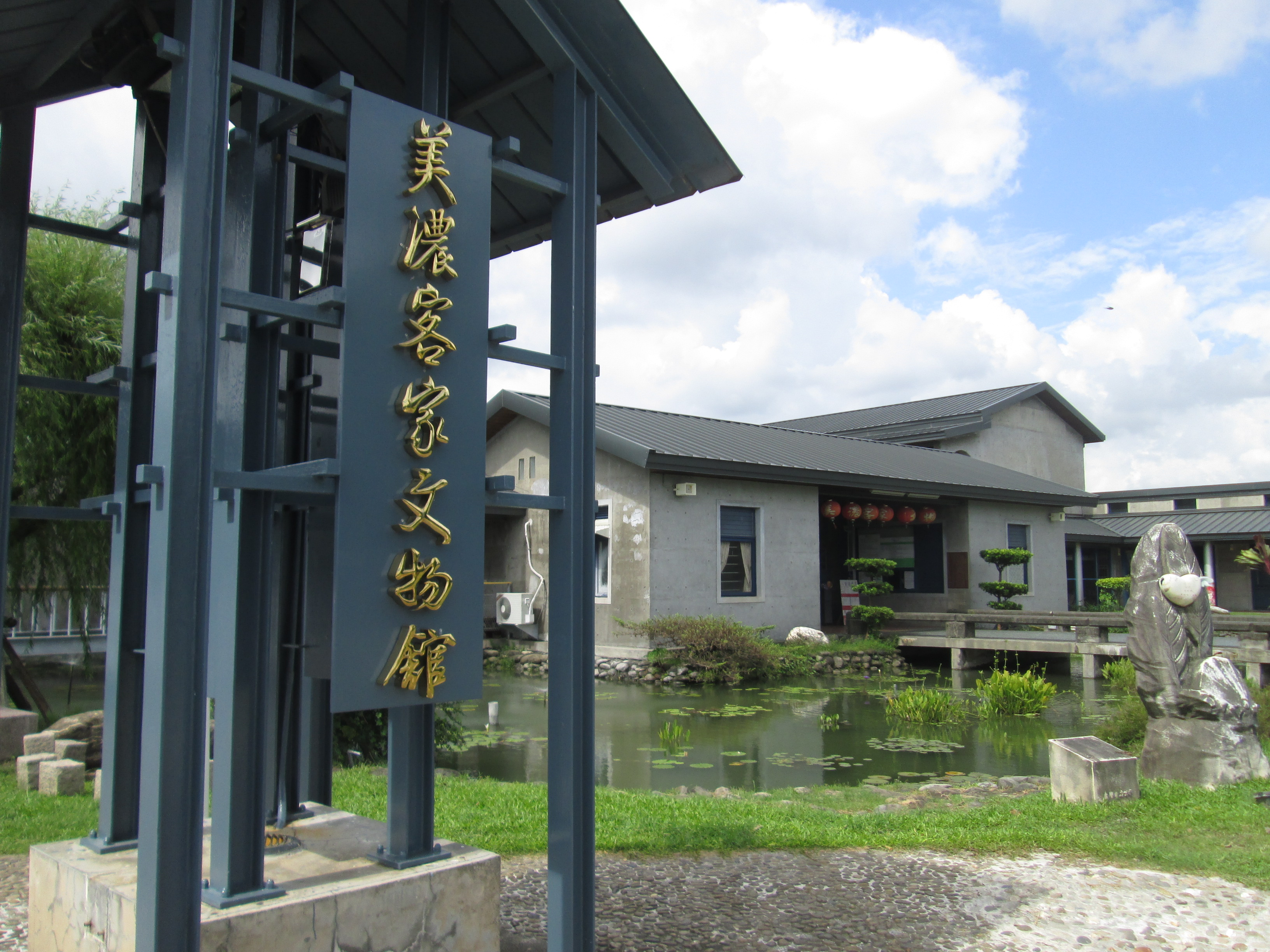
- Established: 28 April 2001
- Location: Meinong, Kaohsiung, Taiwan
- Coordinates: 22°54′40″N 120°33′27″E
- Type: museum
- Architect: Hsie Ying-jun

The Meinong Hakka Culture Museum (traditional Chinese: 美濃客家文物館; simplified Chinese: 美浓客家文物馆; pinyin: Měinóng Kèjiā Wénwùguǎn) is a cultural museum in Meinong District, Kaohsiung, Taiwan.

== History ==
During the opening ceremony speech on 28 April 2001, President Chen Shui-bian emphasized the effort by the central government to preserve Hakka culture and give it the recognition it deserves.

== Architecture ==
The museum building consists of 2 floors. The museum design was inspired by simplicity and minimalism. Combining the architecture of tobacco (curing) shed and traditional trilateral courtyard house, it embraces innovation and modernity.

== Exhibitions ==
The museum displays Hakka and Meinong culture and history, emphasizing the relationship between the people and their environment.

== See also ==
- List of museums in Taiwan
