= Assembly Affairs Museum, The Legislative Yuan =

Museum in Wufeng, Taichung, Taiwan

- 立法院議政博物館
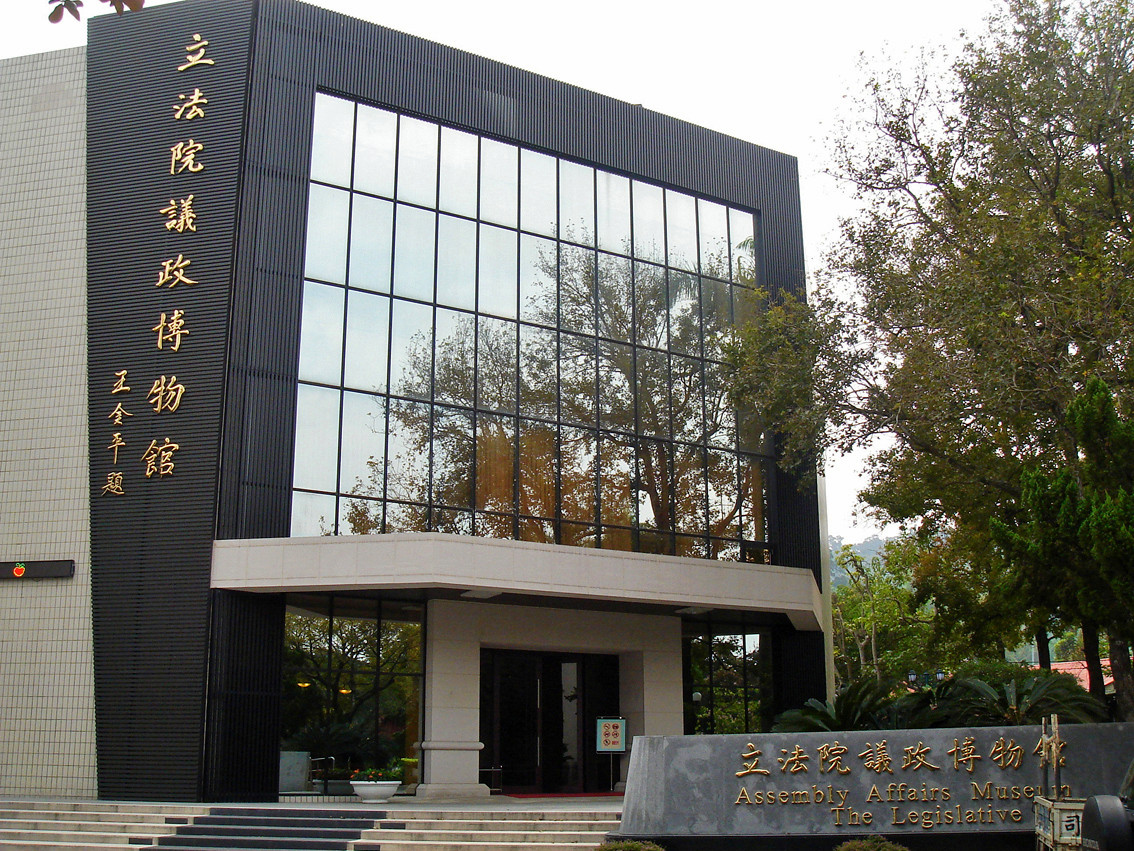
- Established: 2007
- Location: Wufeng, Taichung, Taiwan
- Coordinates: 24°03′11.5″N 120°42′00″E
- Type: museum
- Website: Official website (in Chinese)

The Assembly Affairs Museum, The Legislative Yuan (traditional Chinese: 立法院議政博物館; simplified Chinese: 立法院议政博物馆; pinyin: Lìfǎyuàn Yìzhèng Bówùguǎn) is a museum in Wufeng District, Taichung, Taiwan.

== History ==
The museum was established by Legislative Yuan Secretary-General Lin Hsi-shan to maintain and make public the historical data of the legislature and continued the archival work of Legislative Yuan. The building housing the museum had been the library of the Taiwan Provincial Consultative Council.

== Exhibitions ==
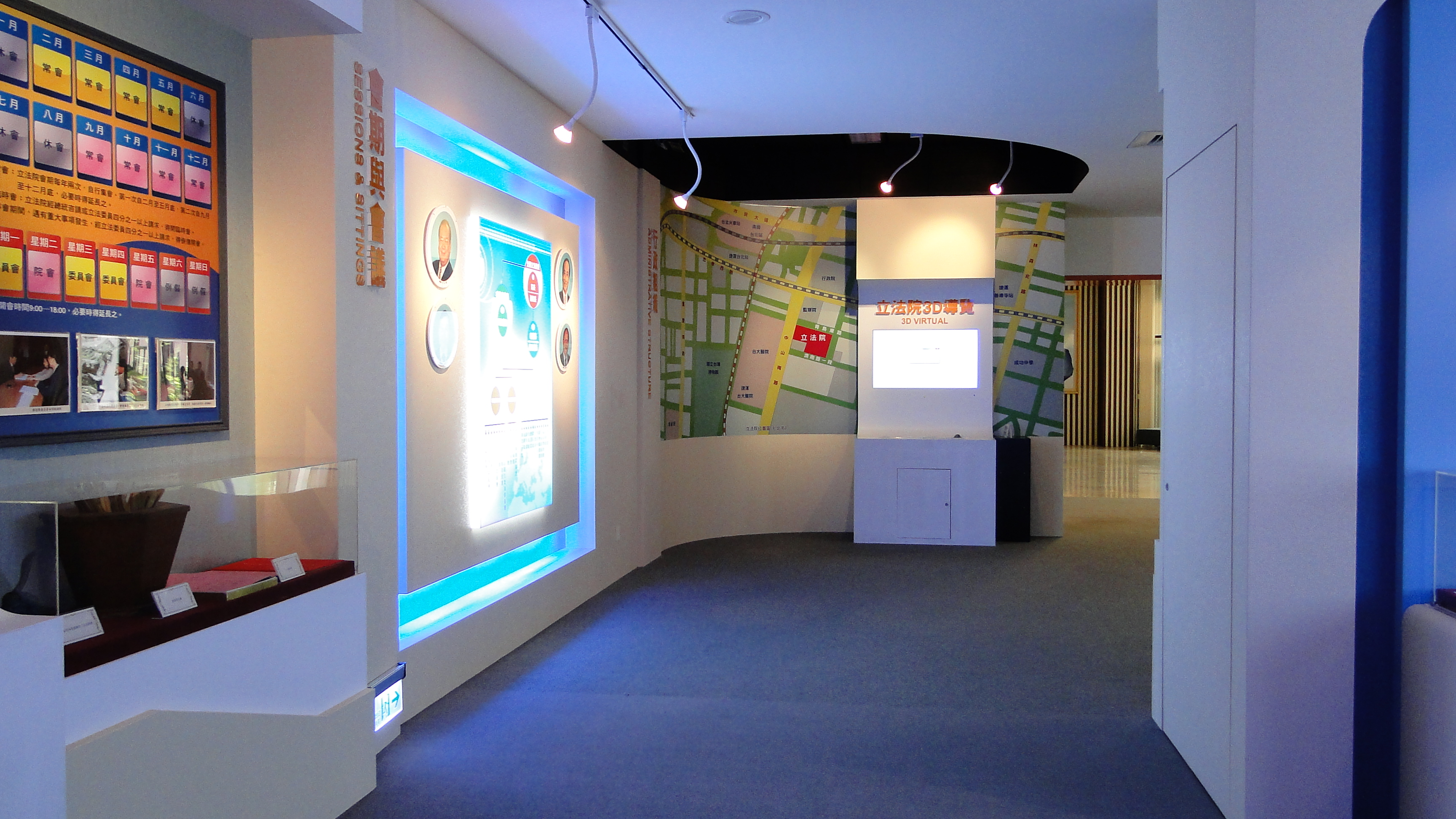
Exhibits in the museum

Section 1

- The collection, collation, analysis, research, archival and digitization of the documents and artifacts-related to the history of assembly development
- The collection and collation of the documents and artifacts-related to the history of local assembly development
- The collection and collation of local assembly publications
- Worldwide inter-museum cooperation and exchange

Section 2

- The utilization and exhibition of the documents and artifacts-related to the history of assembly development
- The utilization and exhibition of the documents and artifacts-related to the history of local assembly development
- The utilization and exhibition of local assembly publications
- The exhibition of the files, historical documents and books and data that are historic in assembly development
- Exhibitions, contacts, services and guided tours of assembly data

== Responsibilities ==
- Matters relating to the collection, organization, archiving and exhibition of assembly affairs-related historical materials
- Matters relating to the analysis, study and use of assembly affairs-related historical materials
- Matters relating to the digitization of assembly affairs-related historical materials and associated services
- Liaising on other assembly affairs information-related services

== See also ==
- List of museums in Taiwan
- Legislative Yuan
