= Museum of Fiber Arts, Taichung =

Museum in Dali, Taichung, Taiwan

Museum of Fiber Arts
- 台中市纖維工藝博物館
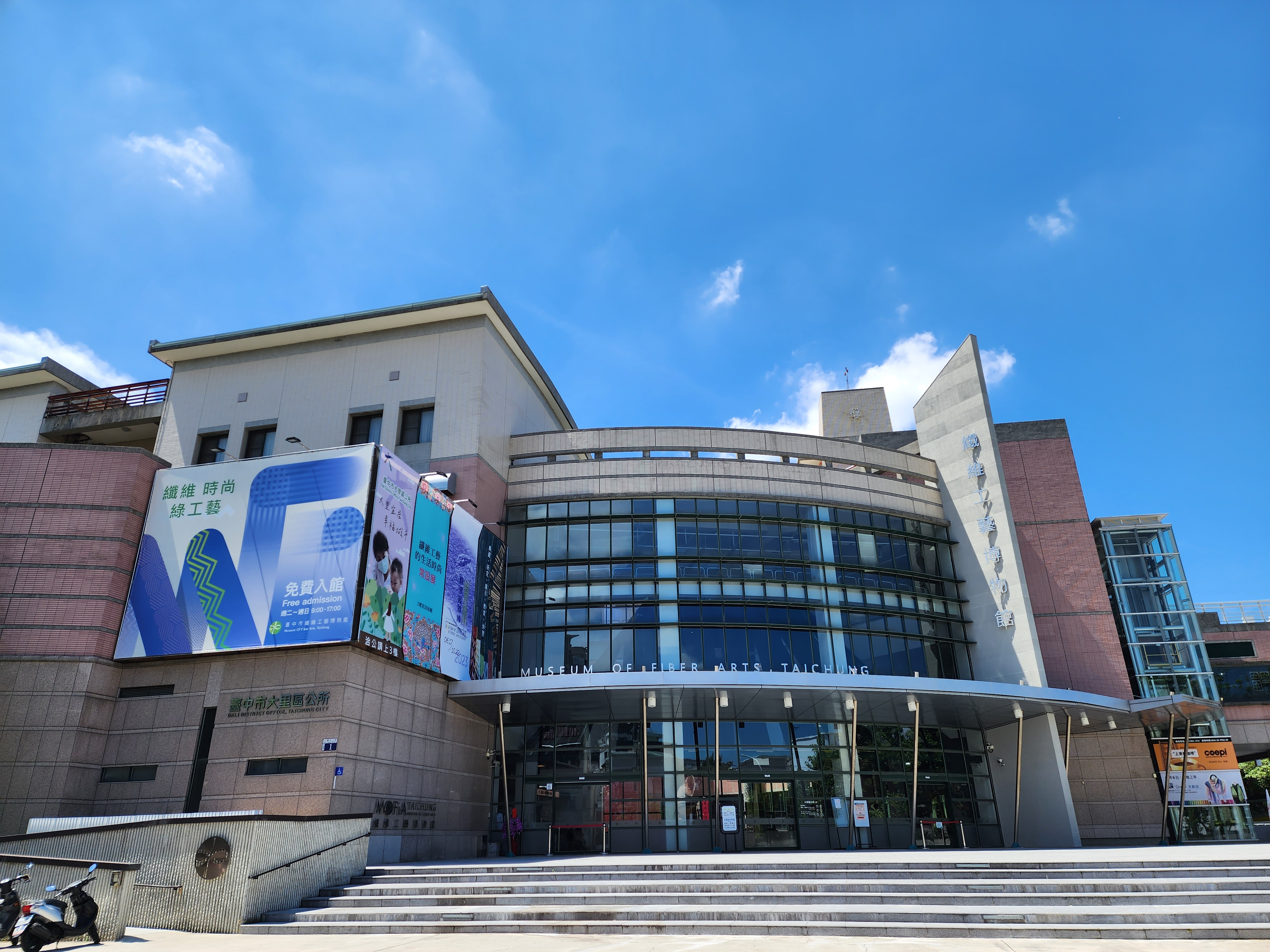
- Dissolved: January 2015
- Location: Dali, Taichung, Taiwan
- Coordinates: 24°05′59″N 120°41′13″E
- Type: museum
- Website: Official website

The Museum of Fiber Arts, Taichung (MOFiA; Chinese: 台中市纖維工藝博物館; pinyin: Táizhōng Értóng Yìshùguǎn) was a museum in Dali District, Taichung, Taiwan. The site became Taichung's Museum of Fiber Arts in 2016.

== Architecture ==
- Alice in Wonderland
- Diagon Alley
- Happy Drawing Room
- International English Art Village
- Music World
- Puzzle Area
- Rainbow Bridge
- Reading Room

== Activities ==
The museum offered special programs for children during summer vacations, such as clay creation, bead work, English and art village, corrugated paper doll making, chess and other recreational and educational programs.

== See also ==
- List of museums in Taiwan
