= National Taiwan Museum of Comics =

Upcoming museum in West, Taichung, Taiwan

- 國家漫畫博物館
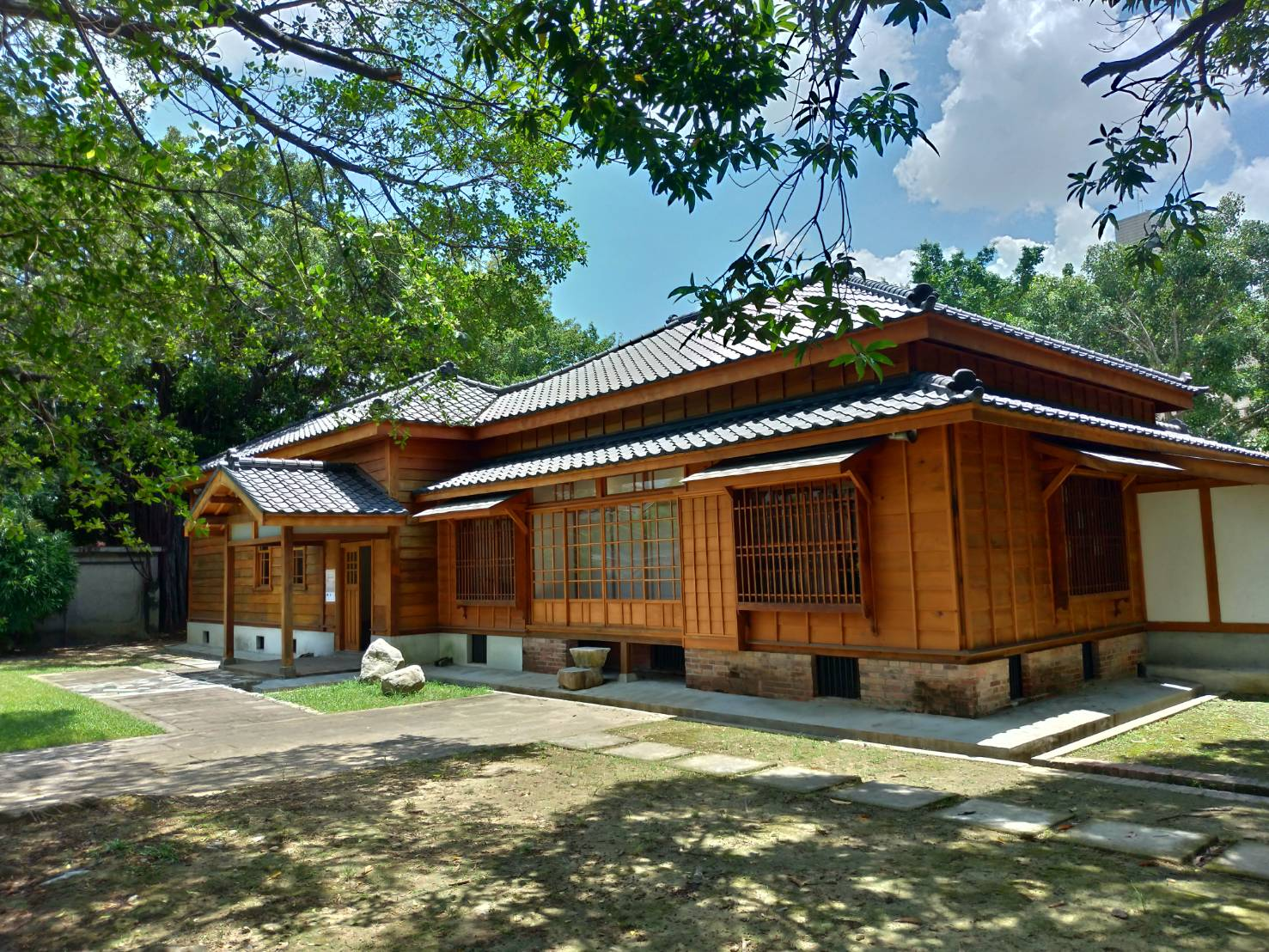
- Former Taichung Prison Governor Mansion
- Established: 2025
- Location: West, Taichung, Taiwan
- Coordinates: 24°08′02.7″N 120°40′26.7″E
- Type: museum
- Website: Official website (in Chinese)

The National Taiwan Museum of Comics (NTMC; traditional Chinese: 國家漫畫博物館; simplified Chinese: 国家漫画博物馆; pinyin: Guójiā Mànhuà Bówùguǎn) is a museum in West District, Taichung, Taiwan.

== History ==
On 1 September 2017, Taichung Mayor Lin Chia-lung proposed to build a comic museum. Later on 20 October, Ministry of Culture and Taichung City Government announced they will be establishing the National Comics Museum in Taichung Shuinan Economic and Trade Park. The museum will be part of the Central Taiwan Cinema Center, which later started construction on 2 April 2018.

On 13 May 2020, due to disputes over the spacing arrangements of the Central Taiwan Cinema Center, the Ministry of Culture decided to withdraw the museum from the location.

On 23 September 2020, the Ministry of Culture then chose two sites for the proposed site for the comic museum, which were Empire Sugar Factory Taichung Office (Chinese: 帝國製糖廠臺中營業所) and Xinmin Street Railway Warehouses (Chinese: 臺鐵新民街倉庫群). The museum is expected to be opened by the end of 2023. However, the plan was then halted in early 2023 due to a land ownership dispute.

On 1 April 2023, the Japanese-era Taichung Prison (Chinese: 臺中刑務所) was chosen as the new location for the museum. The building complex in which the museum will be established was constructed in 1937 during the Japanese rule of Taiwan as a training ground for prison officers to practice judo and kendo. After the handover of Taiwan from Japan to the Republic of China in 1945, the venue was transformed into Taichung Prison.

On 23 December 2023, the museum officially and partially opened.

== Architecture ==
The museum will occupy a total land of more than two hectares. It will consist of 19 Japanese buildings and one planned building. These include the Budokan Martial Arts Hall, built in 1937 to train prison guards, and the officials’ quarters, built in 1915.

== Transportation ==
The museum will be accessible northeast from Wuquan Station of Taiwan Railway.

== Gallery ==
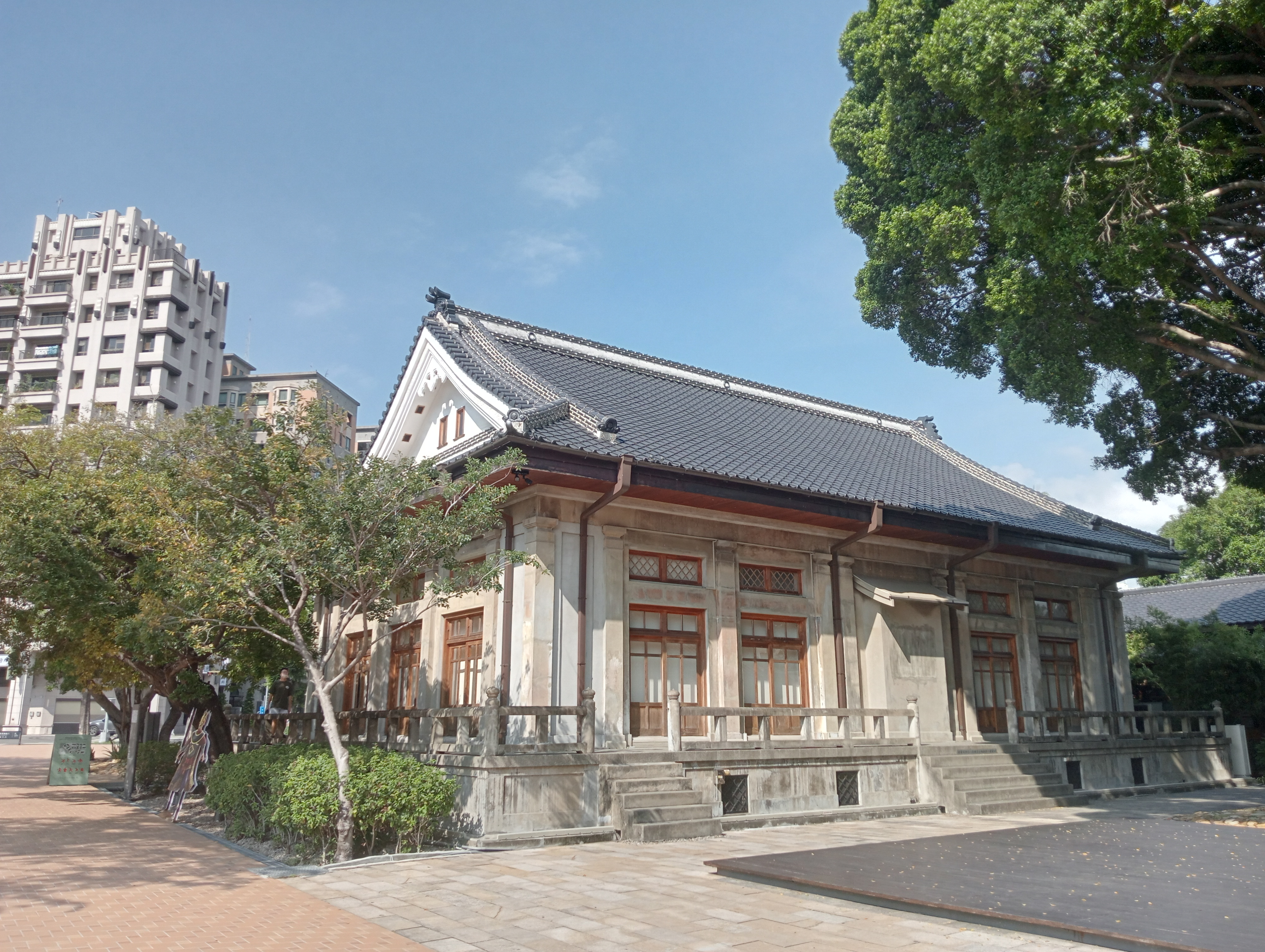
Budokan Martial Arts Hall

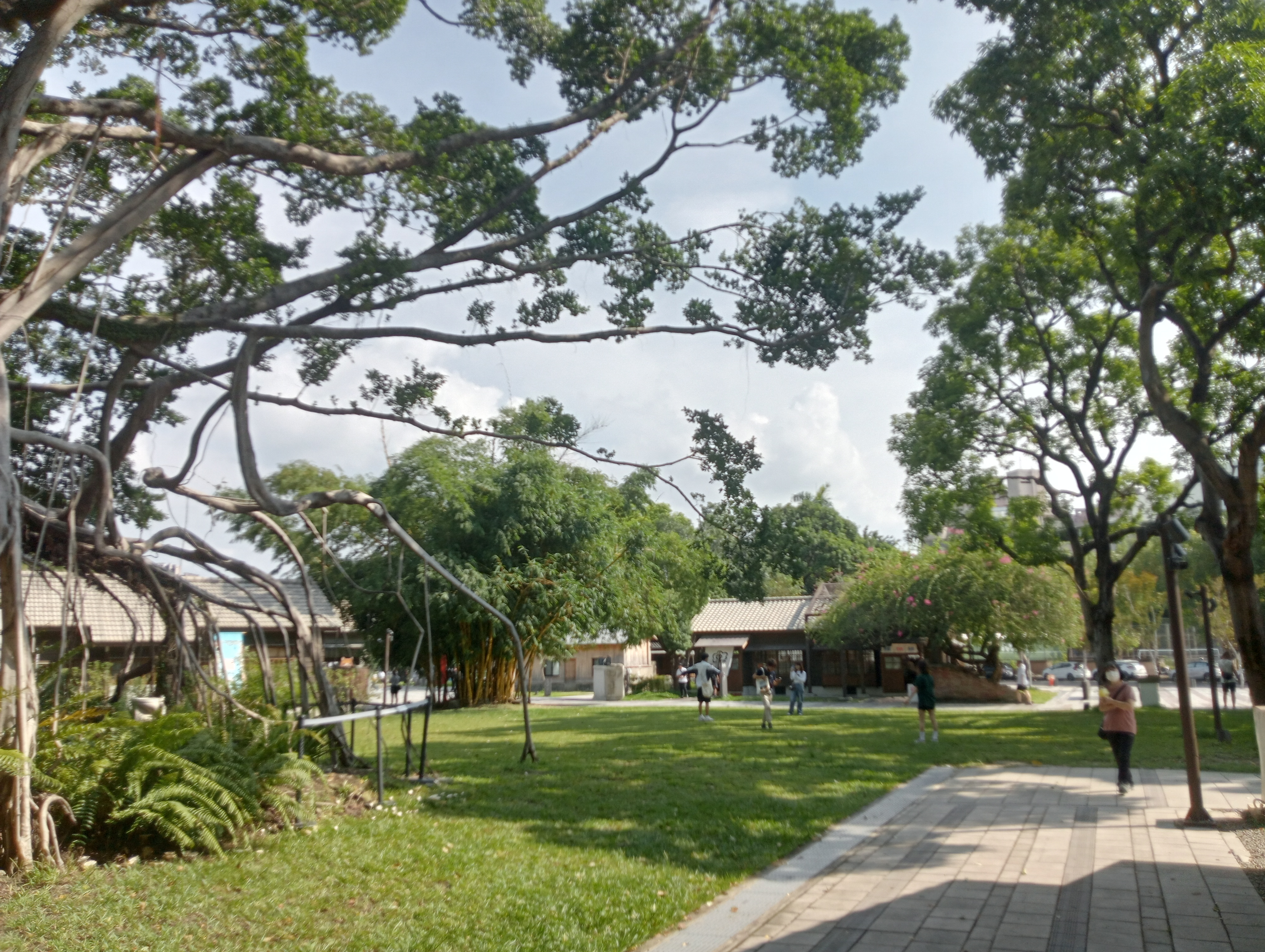

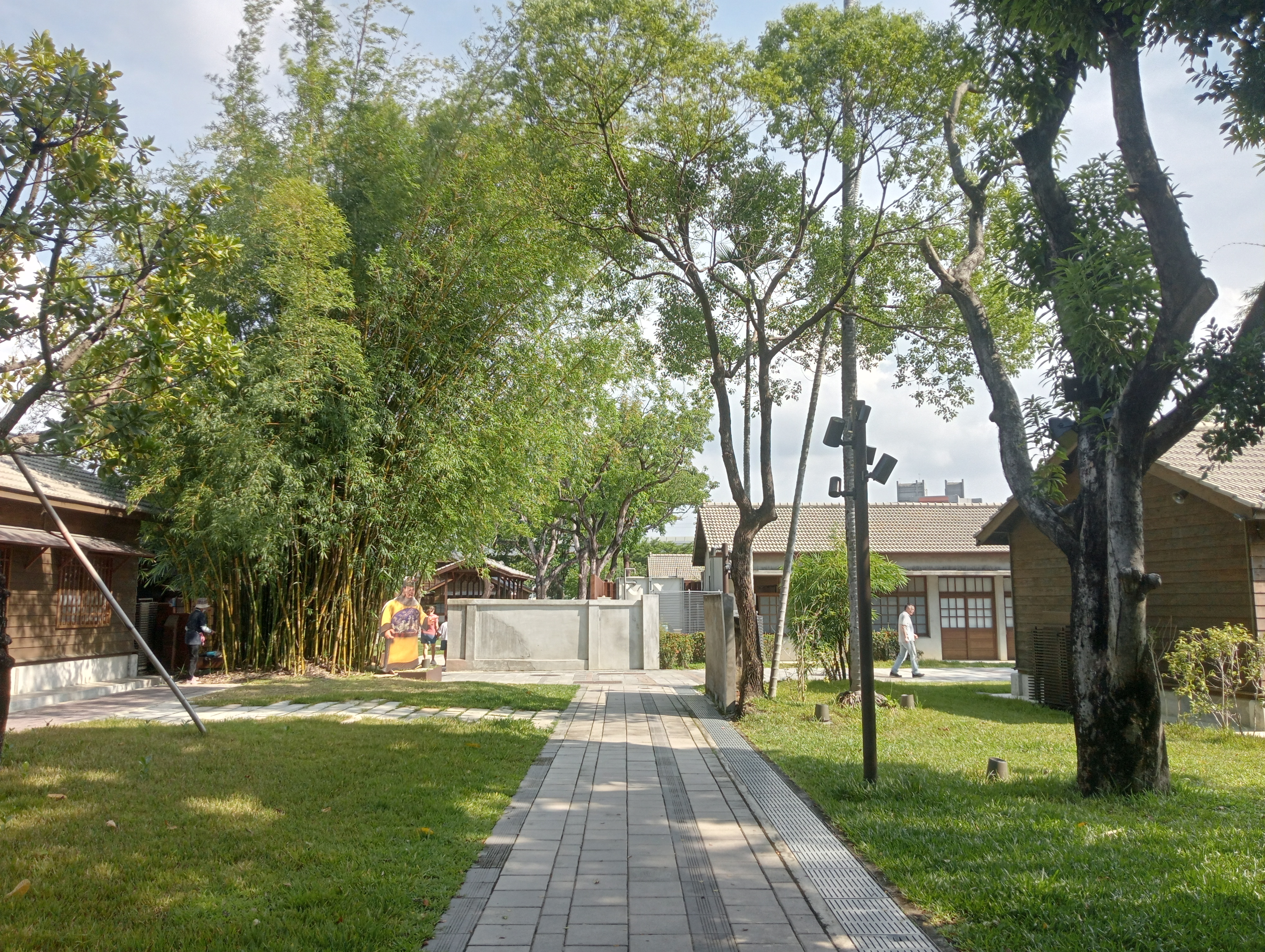

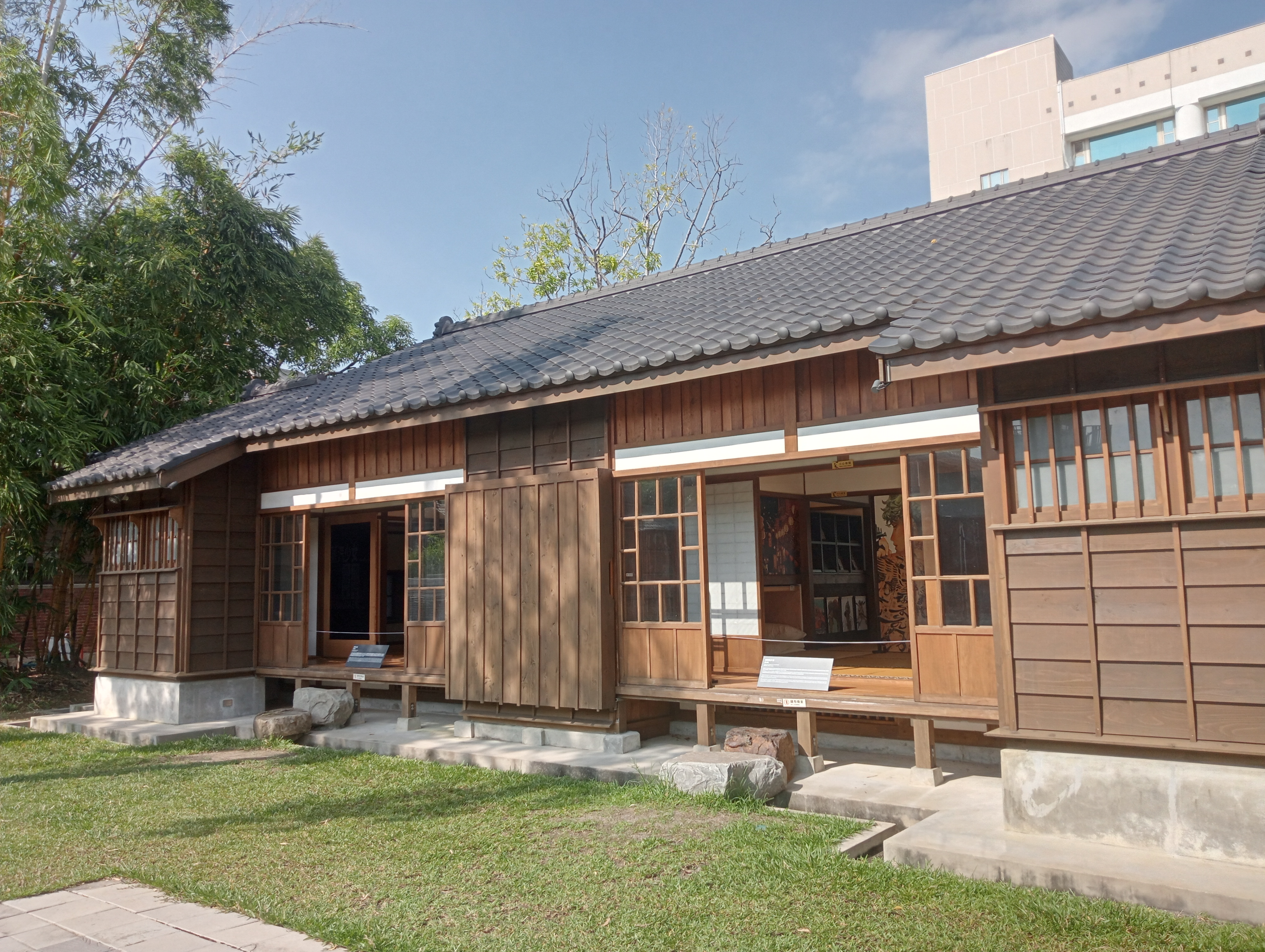
Comics exhibition in one of the Japanese buildings

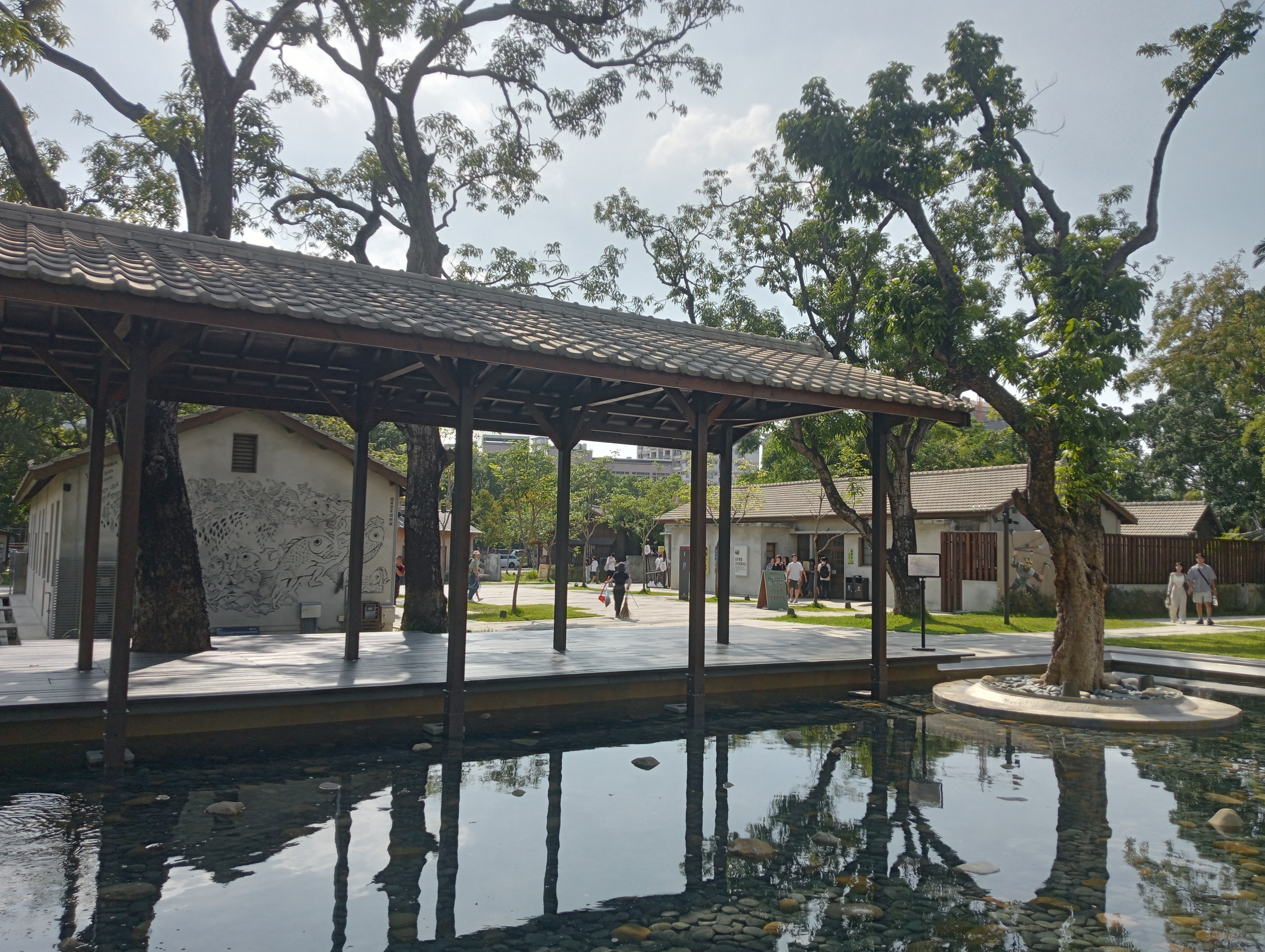
Mirror Lake

== See also ==
- List of museums in Taiwan
