= Taiwan Theater Museum =

Museum in Yilan City, Yilan County, Taiwan

- 台灣戲劇館
- Established: 21 April 1990
- Location: Yilan City, Yilan County, Taiwan
- Coordinates: 24°44′58″N 121°44′43″E
- Type: museum
- Public transit access: Yilan Station

The Taiwan Theater Museum (traditional Chinese: 台灣戲劇館; simplified Chinese: 台湾戏剧馆; pinyin: Táiwān Xìjùguǎn) is a museum about theatre in Yilan City, Yilan County, Taiwan. The museum is dedicated to Taiwan's theatrical arts and operas. It is the first public theater museum in Taiwan and the first museum established in Yilan County. The museum is managed by the Ministry of Culture.

== History ==
Starting from its early planning stage in 1986, the Council for Cultural Affairs appointed a professor from Chinese Culture University (CCU) to head the planning stage for the museum under the supervision of the council. The museum was finally opened on 21 April 1990. Upon its establishment, the museum was originally named the Taiwanese Opera Information Center due to its original focus on Taiwanese opera. Later, knowing that Yilan had a valuable collection of puppet theater resources, the museum was subsequently expanded to include puppet theater in its scope and was renamed the Taiwan Drama Center. Following the suggestion from the CCU in 1998, the museum was finally renamed Taiwan Theater Museum. In 2002, the museum opened the Taiwanese Opera Study Workshop.

== Missions ==
The museum has the following mission:

- Compile information on the development of Taiwanese theater;
- Survey, gather and collate all things related to folk theater;
- Evaluate its social, cultural and artistic significance, so as to inspire folk artists and to raise and pioneer theatrical art;
- Through performance, exhibition and promotion, to deepen public understanding of the meaning and significance of folk theater art;
- Encourage the coexistence and fusion of traditional folk art with contemporary culture.

== Exhibitions ==
The museum has the following exhibits:

- First floor is for the lobby decorated with effigies of three colorfully dressed Gods, the appointed protectors of Taiwanese theaters;
- Second floor is the temporary exhibition hall;
- Third floor is the permanent exhibition hall, which consists of a collection wall of Taiwanese opera costumes and props.

== Activities ==
The museum periodically hosts live Taiwanese opera and puppet shows as well as other cultural activities.

== Transportation ==
The museum is accessible within walking distance southwest from Yilan Station of the Taiwan Railway.

== See also ==
- List of museums in Taiwan
