= Fire Safety Museum of Taipei City Fire Department =

Museum in Neihu, Taipei, Taiwan

- 防災科學教育館
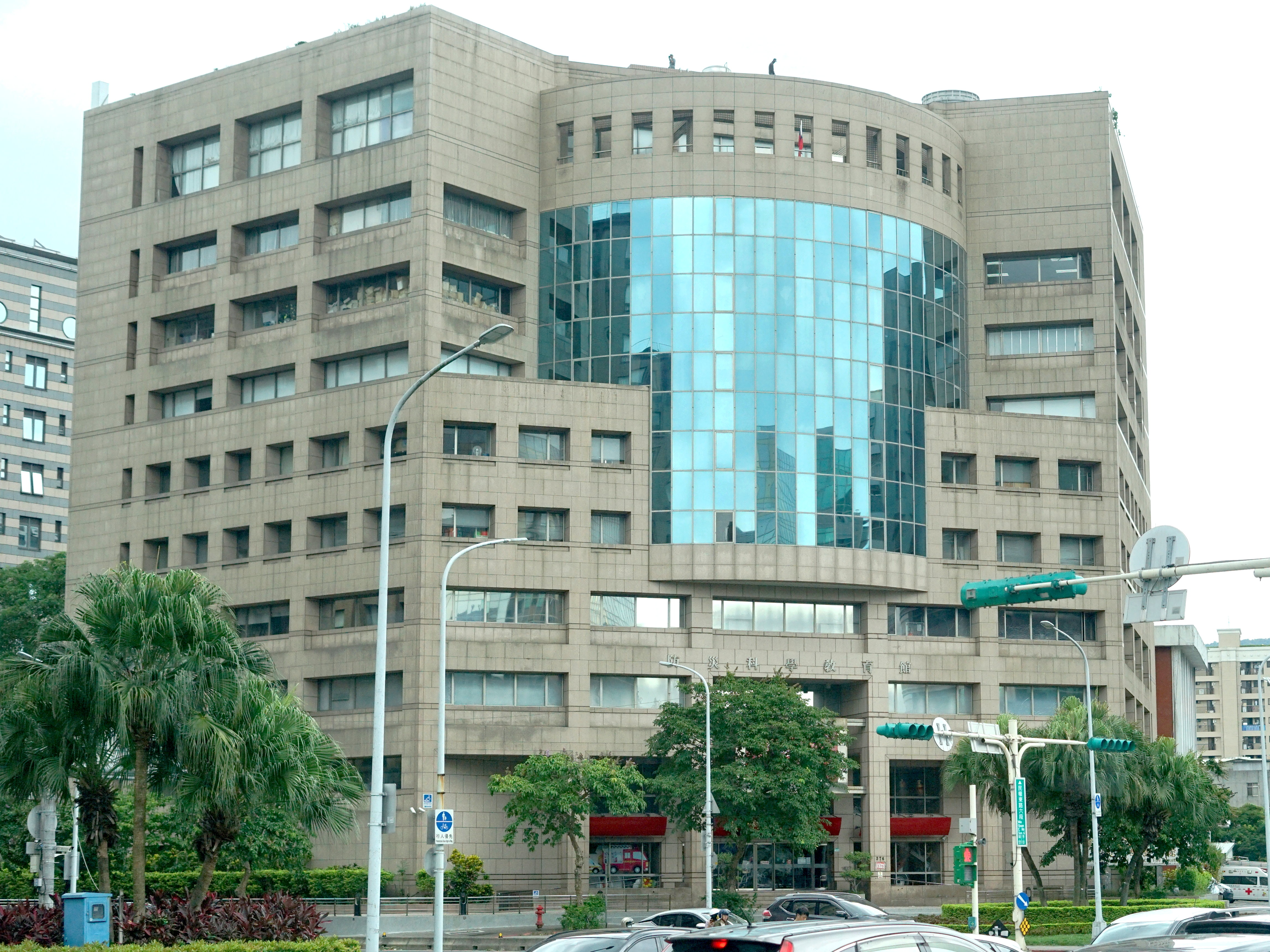
- Established: November 1998
- Location: Neihu, Taipei, Taiwan
- Coordinates: 25°04′10″N 121°35′25″E
- Type: museum
- Website: Official website

The Fire Safety Museum of Taipei City Fire Department (traditional Chinese: 防災科學教育館; simplified Chinese: 防灾科学教育馆; pinyin: Fángzāi Kēxué Jiàoyùguǎn) is a museum on firefighting in Neihu District, Taipei, Taiwan.

== History ==
The museum was built in response to the Great Hanshin earthquake in Japan on 17 January 1995 to teach people what to do during a natural disaster. On 10 July 1995, the newly restructured Taipei City Fire Department planned to build Taiwan's first fire safety museum aiming to build awareness among the public about the danger of natural disaster. The museum was opened in November 1998.

== Architecture ==
The museum spans over 5 floors. The first floor consists of the introduction area, children's safety training classroom, questions and answers complex assessment area, storeroom and 3D scenes. The second floor consists of storm simulation area, disaster prevention information room, earthquake virtual reality escape game area and household railed window demonstration area. The third floor consists of quake simulation area, sunshine digital interactive show and CPR training area. The fourth floor consists of fire prevention education, smoke experience area and community safety classroom. The tenth floor consists of multimedia room and fire fighting museum.

== Transportation ==
The museum is accessible within walking distance south from Wende Station of the Taipei Metro.

== See also ==
- List of museums in Taiwan
- Fire museum
