= Li Tien-lu Hand Puppet Historical Museum =

Museum in Sanzhi, New Taipei, Taiwan

- 李天祿布袋戲文物館
- Established: 31 December 1996
- Location: Sanzhi, New Taipei, Taiwan
- Coordinates: 25°16′N 121°31′E
- Type: museum

The Li Tien-lu Hand Puppet Historical Museum (simplified Chinese: 李天禄布袋戏文物馆; traditional Chinese: 李天祿布袋戲文物館; pinyin: Litiānlù Bùdàixì Wénwùguǎn) is a museum in Sanzhi District, New Taipei, Taiwan.

== History ==
The museum opened on 31 December 1996, two years before the death of its namesake, the puppeteer Li Tien-lu. The museum was reopened on 1 January 2005 after renovation works.

== Exhibitions ==
The museum houses more than 200 antique puppet heads of more than 100 years old as well as cultural relics. The Almost Life Like Puppet Theater also perform regularly in the museum. Within its collections are items used by Li during his career.

== See also ==
- List of museums in Taiwan
