= National Cheng Kung University Museum =

Museum in East, Tainan, Taiwan

- 國立成功大學博物館
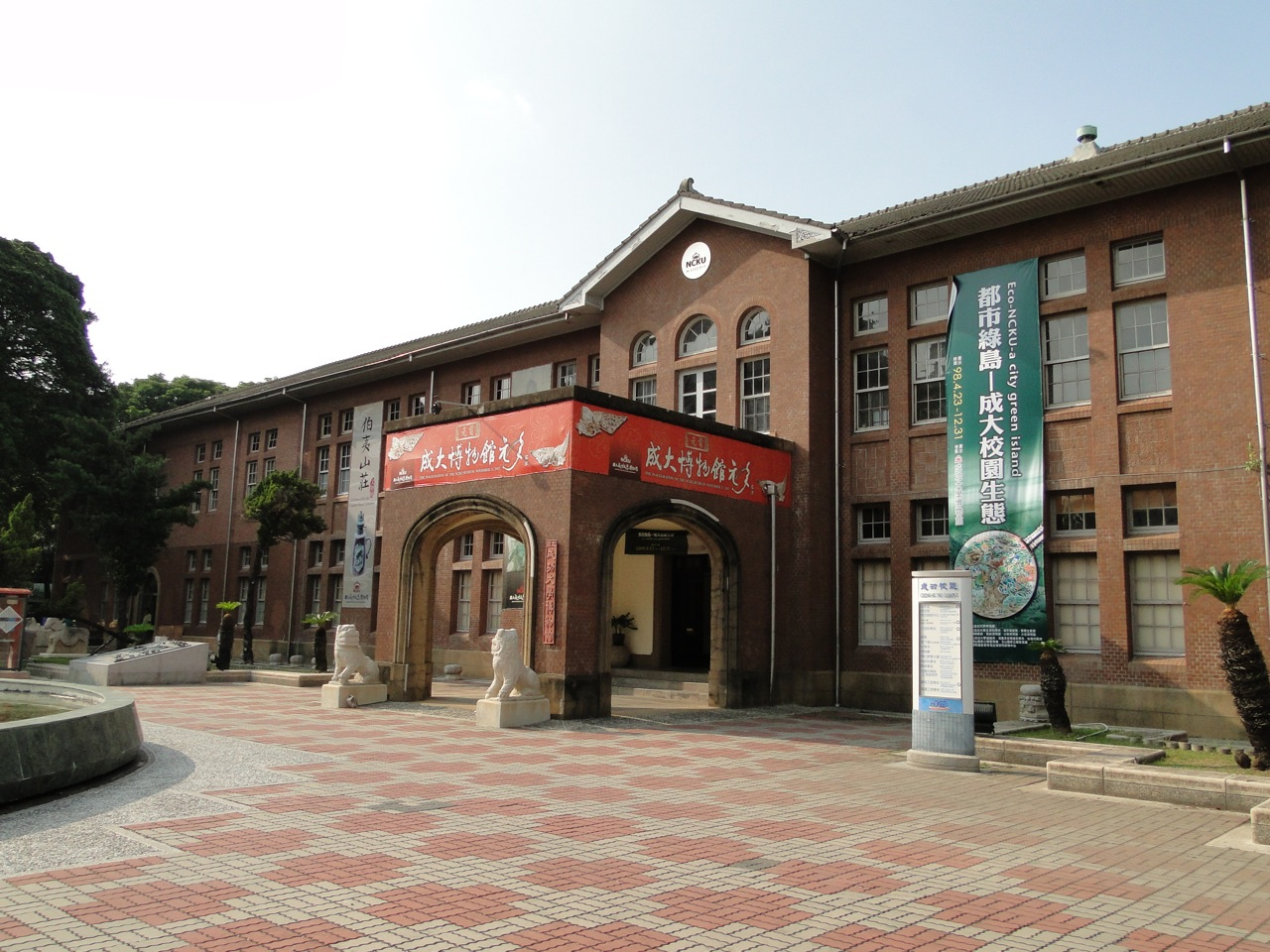
- Established: November 2006
- Location: East, Tainan, Taiwan
- Coordinates: 22°59′48″N 120°13′11″E
- Type: museum
- Owner: National Cheng Kung University
- Website: Official website

The National Cheng Kung University Museum (traditional Chinese: 國立成功大學博物館; simplified Chinese: 国立成功大学博物馆; pinyin: Guólì Chénggōng Dàxué Bówùguǎn) or (Chinese: 成大博物館; pinyin: Chéngdà Bówùguǎn) is a museum in East District, Tainan, Taiwan. The museum is located at National Cheng Kung University.

== History ==
The idea for a museum came in 1999, when Po-Yih Hsu pledged to donate his collection of historical artifacts to the University. President Cheng-I Weng and Vice President Hung-Shan Weng saw the opportunity for building a museum that would also exhibit the collection in the university's possession. The campus had mechanical artifacts like ancient locks, mineral samples, animal and botanical samples, historical artifacts, and works of art like calligraphy and paintings. In July 1999, a team was formed to oversee the establishment of the museum. On February 1, 2000 the team began work of collecting and recording the artifacts to be put on display.

The first major contribution to the museum was made by Mr Po-Yih Hsu in autumn of 2000. He donated 2,412 pieces of artifacts. The collection contained 1,823 pottery and ceramics, 202 stone sculptures, 112 wood sculptures, 102 puppets, 115 religious paintings, 21 bamboo woven handicraft articles, and a few objects of iron, plastic and tin. A few years later, in 2003, the building on Cheng Kung Campus, which had been occupied by the Japanese from 1895–1945, was turned into the museum's office and exhibition room. A research team composed of various scholars and experts then selected 516 items from Mr. Po-Yih Hsu's large collection. The museum was officially opened in November 2006, the year the university entered its 76th year.

== Architecture ==
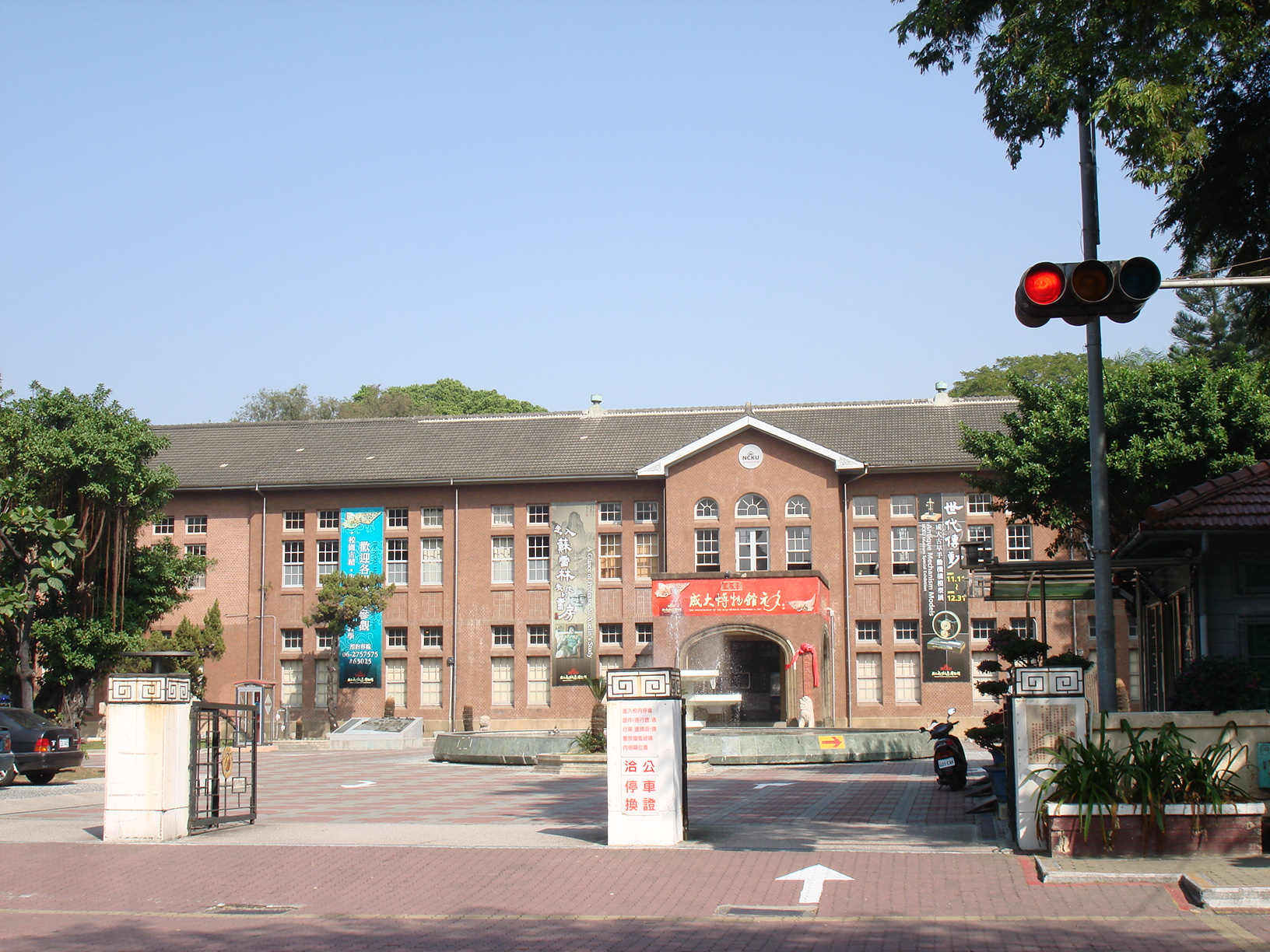
Front view of the National Cheng Kung University Museum.

The museum building was built in 1933 originally as the Tainan Technical College's administration center.

== See also ==
- List of museums in Taiwan
- National Cheng Kung University
