= Mei-hwa Spinning Top Museum =

Museum in Daxi, Taoyuan City, Taiwan

- 美華國小陀螺展示館
- Established: 2007
- Location: Daxi, Taoyuan City, Taiwan
- Coordinates: 24°52′54″N 121°18′18″E
- Type: museum

The Mei-hwa Spinning Top Museum (traditional Chinese: 美華國小陀螺展示館; simplified Chinese: 美华国小陀螺展示馆; pinyin: Měihuá Guóxiǎo Tuóluó Zhǎnshìguǎn) is a museum about spinning tops in Daxi District, Taoyuan City, Taiwan.

== History ==
The museum began to operate in 2007.

== Architecture ==
The museum is located at the Meihua Elementary School.

== See also ==
- List of museums in Taiwan
