= Spring Onion Culture Museum =

Museum in Sanxing, Yilan County, Taiwan

- 青蔥文化館
- Established: 2005
- Location: Sanxing, Yilan County, Taiwan
- Coordinates: 24°40′05.5″N 121°39′08.5″E
- Type: museum

Spring Onion Culture Museum (traditional Chinese: 青蔥文化館; simplified Chinese: 青葱文化馆; pinyin: Qīngcōng Wénhuàguǎn) is a museum located in Sanxing Township, Yilan County, Taiwan.

== History ==
The museum was opened in 2005.

== Architecture ==
The museum is housed in a facility used as a rice-storage building during the Japanese rule.

== Activities ==
The museum regularly holds food making activities.

== See also ==
- List of museums in Taiwan
