= Taiwan Balloons Museum =

Museum in Shengang, Taichung, Taiwan

- 台灣氣球博物館
- Location: Shengang, Taichung, Taiwan
- Coordinates: 24°14′50.5″N 120°41′56.5″E
- Type: museum
- Management: Taiwan Tailloon Balloons Co., Ltd
- Owners: Taiwan Tailloon Balloons Co., Ltd
- Website: Official website (in Chinese)

The Taiwan Balloons Museum (traditional Chinese: 台灣氣球博物館; simplified Chinese: 台湾气球博物馆; pinyin: Táiwān Qìqiú Bówùguǎn) is a museum about balloons in Anli Village, Shengang District, Taichung, Taiwan.

== History ==
The museum building were once the old factory of the Taiwan Tailloon Balloons Co., Ltd. The current factory of the company is located right next to the museum building where the museum building is still owned and operated by the same company.

== Architecture ==
The museum building resembles a balloon from outside.

== Exhibitions ==
The museum exhibits the balloon production process, balloon making activities and balloon-related games.

== Transportation ==
The museum is accessible west from Fengyuan Station of the Taiwan Railway.

== See also ==
- List of museums in Taiwan
