= World Police Museum =

Museum in Guishan, Taoyuan City, Taiwan

- 世界警察博物館
- Location: Guishan, Taoyuan City, Taiwan
- Coordinates: 25°02′50″N 121°21′05″E
- Type: museum
- Website: Official website

The World Police Museum (traditional Chinese: 世界警察博物館; simplified Chinese: 世界警察博物馆; pinyin: Shìjiè Jǐngchá Bówùguǎn) is a museum about policing in Guishan District, Taoyuan City, Taiwan. The museum is located inside the Central Police University.

== Architecture ==
The floor of the museum spans over an area of 1,320 m^{2}.

== Missions ==
The mission of the museum is:

- To broaden research realm of police studies and to upgrade the quality of police studies
- To gain updated information of all areas for the reference of police reform in Taiwan
- To promote international academic exchange and to strengthen international police cooperation

== Exhibitions ==
The museum has the following exhibits:

- Taiwan Police Hall
- International Police Hall

== See also ==
- List of museums in Taiwan
