= Jiasian Petrified Fossil Museum =

Museum in Jiaxian, Kaohsiung, Taiwan

- 甲仙化石館
- Established: February 1991
- Location: Jiasian, Kaohsiung, Taiwan
- Coordinates: 23°05′31.9″N 120°35′17.7″E
- Type: museum
- Owner: Jiasian District Government

The Jiasian Petrified Fossil Museum (traditional Chinese: 甲仙化石館; simplified Chinese: 甲仙化石馆; Hanyu Pinyin: Jiǎxiān Huàshí Guǎn; Tongyong Pinyin: Jiǎsian Huàshíh Guǎn) is a museum in He'an Village, Jiasian District, Kaohsiung, Taiwan.

== History ==
The museum was established in February 1991. It was built by Jiasian Township Government.

== Architecture ==
The museum was built nearby fossil archaeological site within varied geological structure of the district.

== See also ==
- List of museums in Taiwan
