= Museum of Archives =

Museum in Da'an, Taipei, Taiwan

NTU Archives
- 檔案館
- Established: August 2007
- Location: Da'an, Taipei, Taiwan
- Coordinates: 25°00′56″N 121°31′52″E
- Type: museum
- Website: archives.ntu.edu.tw

The National Taiwan University Archives (traditional Chinese: 檔案館; simplified Chinese: 档案馆; pinyin: Dǎng'àn Zhǎnshìshì) is located at the NTU Shuiyuan Campus in Daan District, Taipei, Taiwan.

== History ==
The archive was established in August 2007 after it was relocated to the Shuiyuan Campus of NTU.

== Themes ==
The archives includes the following themes:

- Establishment
- Continuation
- Revolution
- Seal
- Chartulary
- Epitome

== Transportation ==
The archives is accessible within walking distance west from Gongguan Station of the Taipei Metro.

== See also ==
- List of museums in Taiwan
- National Taiwan University
