= Fubon Art Museum =

Museum in Xinyi, Taipei, Taiwan

- 富邦美術館
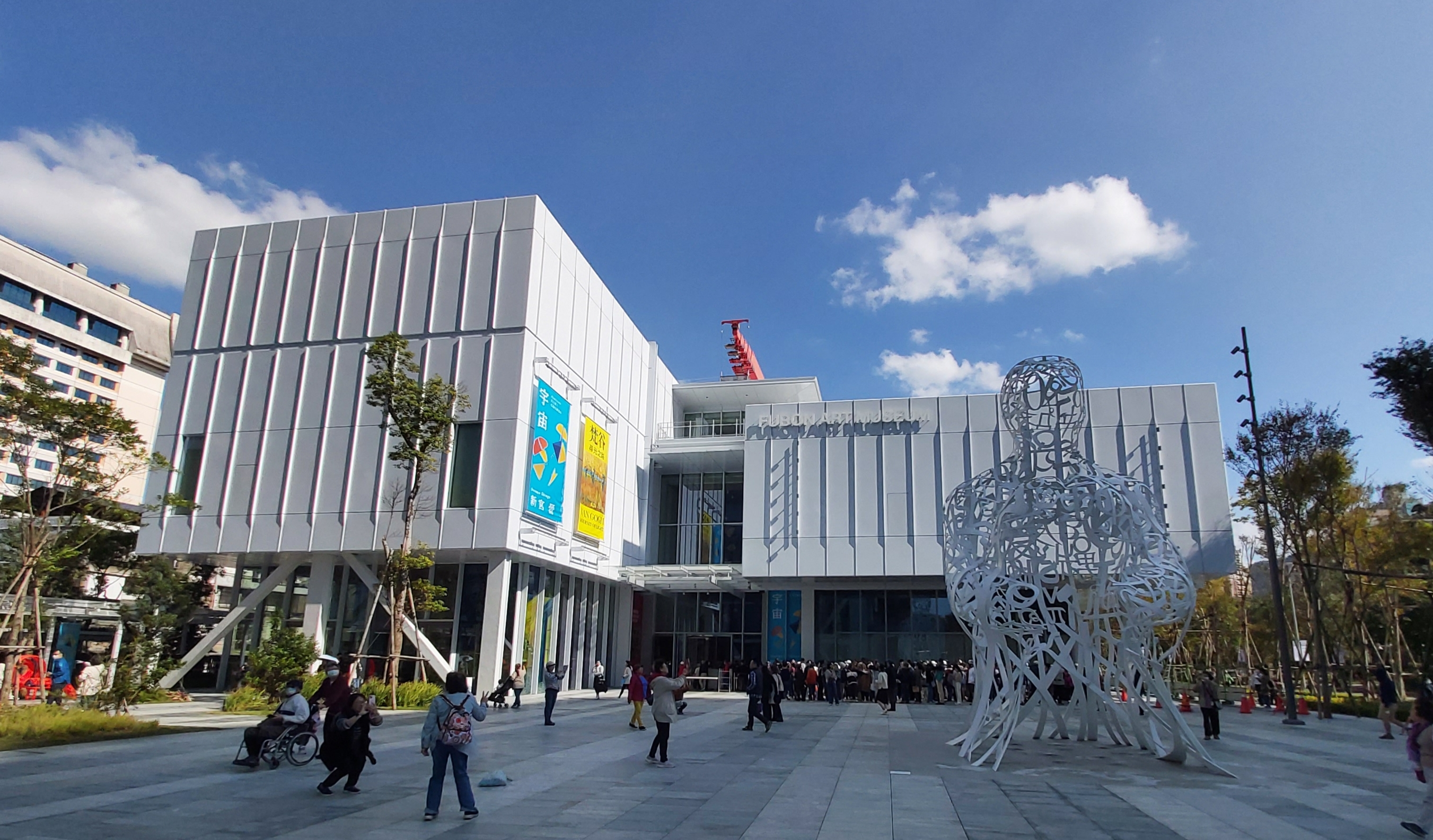
- Square at Fubon Art Museum
- Established: 4 May 2024
- Location: Xinyi, Taipei, Taiwan
- Coordinates: 25.0394°N 121.5711°E
- Type: private art museum
- Director: Maggie Ueng (翁美慧)
- Website: Official website

The Fubon Art Museum (Chinese: 富邦美術館) is a private museum in Fubon Xinyi A25, Xinyi, Taipei, Taiwan. It was planned in 2015 and established in 2024 by Dr. Maggie Tsai (Chinese: 翁美慧), CEO of Fubon Art Foundation (Chinese: 富邦藝術基金會) and wife of Richard Tsai, chairman of Fubon Financial Holding Co..

== Overview ==
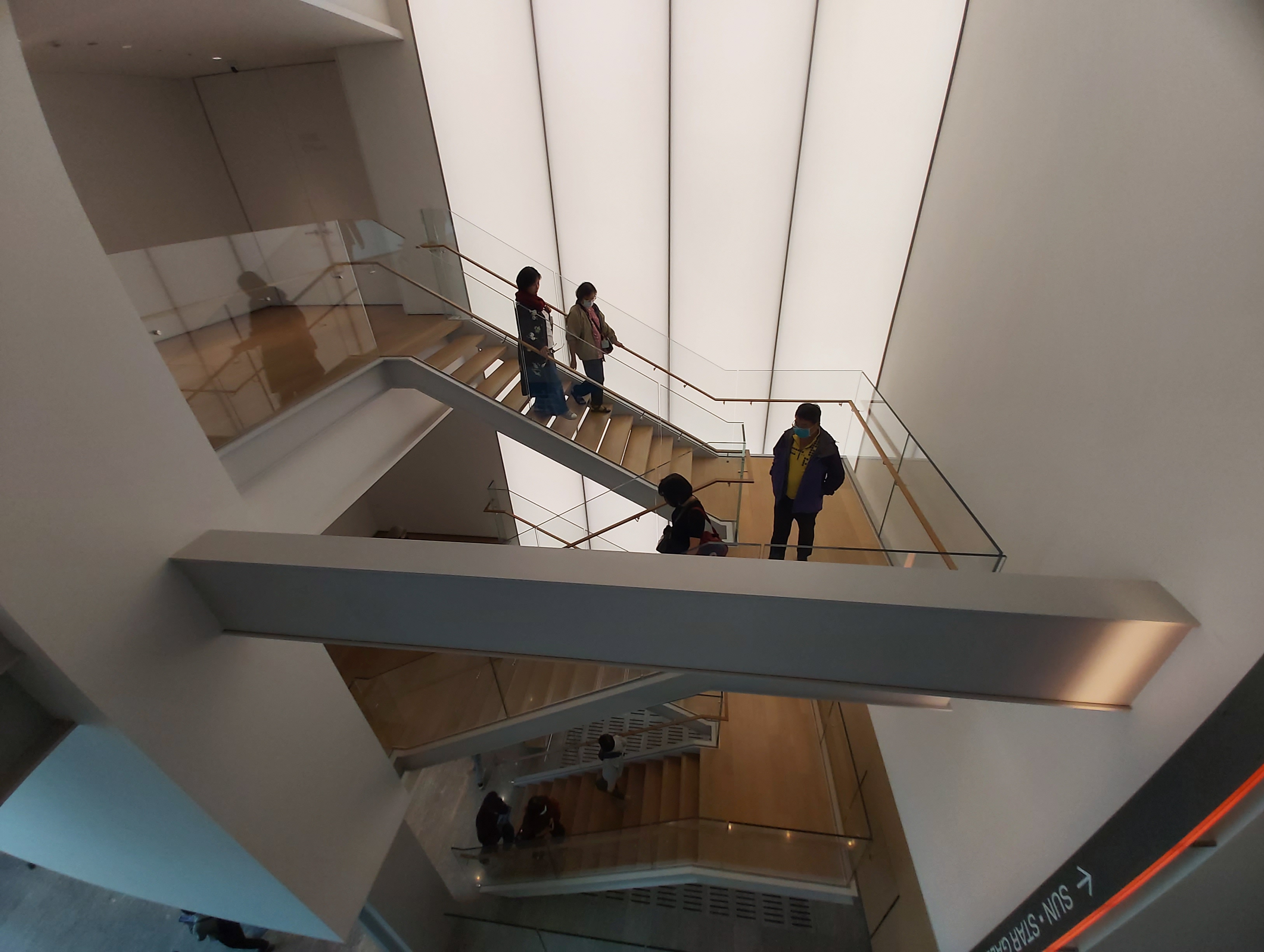
Interior of the Fubon Art Museum

Covering an area of 3,000 pings, the museum is a five-story high building with an uninterrupted open space. It has three main galleries: Water Gallery, Sun Gallery, and Star Gallery. The Water Gallery uses a glass curtain, while the Sun Gallery and the Star Gallery use sunlight to refract the galleries with rollers to adjust the light. The museum also provides lectures, children workshop, a multimedia exhibition space "Garden Studio", and a shop "The Light". There are also installation artworks by Jaume Plensa and Susumu Shingu around the museum.

== History ==
In 2015, the Fubon Art Foundation decided to establish a new museum, and later collaborated with Renzo Piano and Kris Yao on designing, planning, and constructing the museum. It is Piano's first project in Taiwan. After years of construction, Fubon Art Museum was established on 4 May 2024. The first director is Dr. Maggie Tsai. The museum has a permanent collection of Sanyu and Yun Gee when it was established.

The first exhibition after its establishment is the collection of Auguste Rodin, in collaboration with the Los Angeles County Museum of Art. In August, the museum launched another exhibition. The subject is Vincent van Gogh, in collaboration with the Kröller-Müller Museum.

The museum sparked controversy over charging 1,200 TWD (37.10 USD in 2024) for regular tickets, compared to Metropolitan Museum of Art's US$28, Centre Pompidou's 17 EUR (US$18.50 in 2024), Leeum Museum of Art's 10,000 KRW (US$7.27 in 2024), and Mori Art Museum's 1,800 JPY (US$11.62 in 2024). Taiwanese artist Katy Hsiu Chih Chien (簡秀枝) criticised that the fare is unreasonable for oridernary people. Chu Teh-I (曲德義), professor emeritus of Taipei National University of the Arts, described the fare as "rarely expensive". Fubon Art Museum, on the other hand, responded that the fare includes all exhibitions in the museum, and all of them cost a very high price.

== Gallery ==
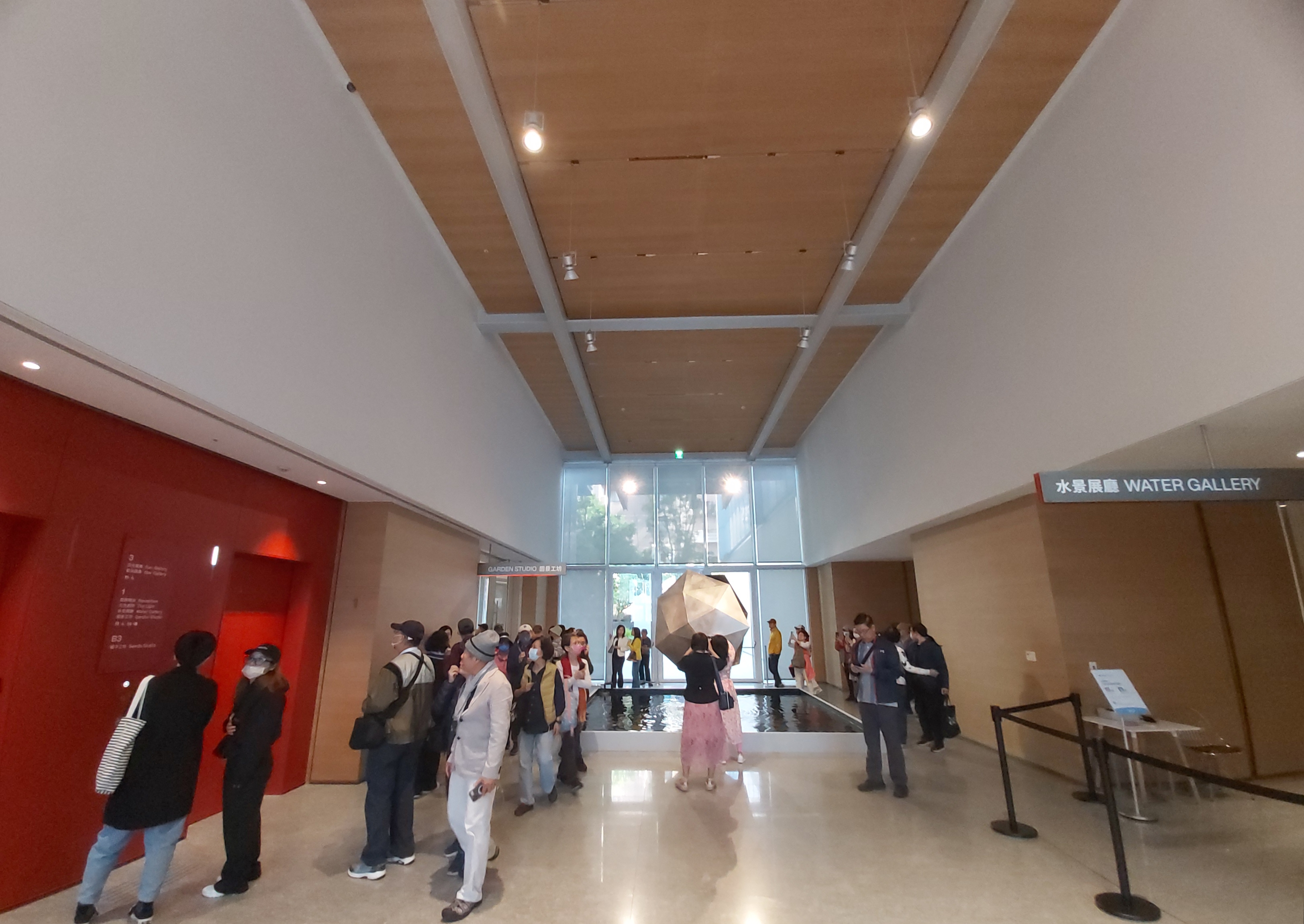
Hall

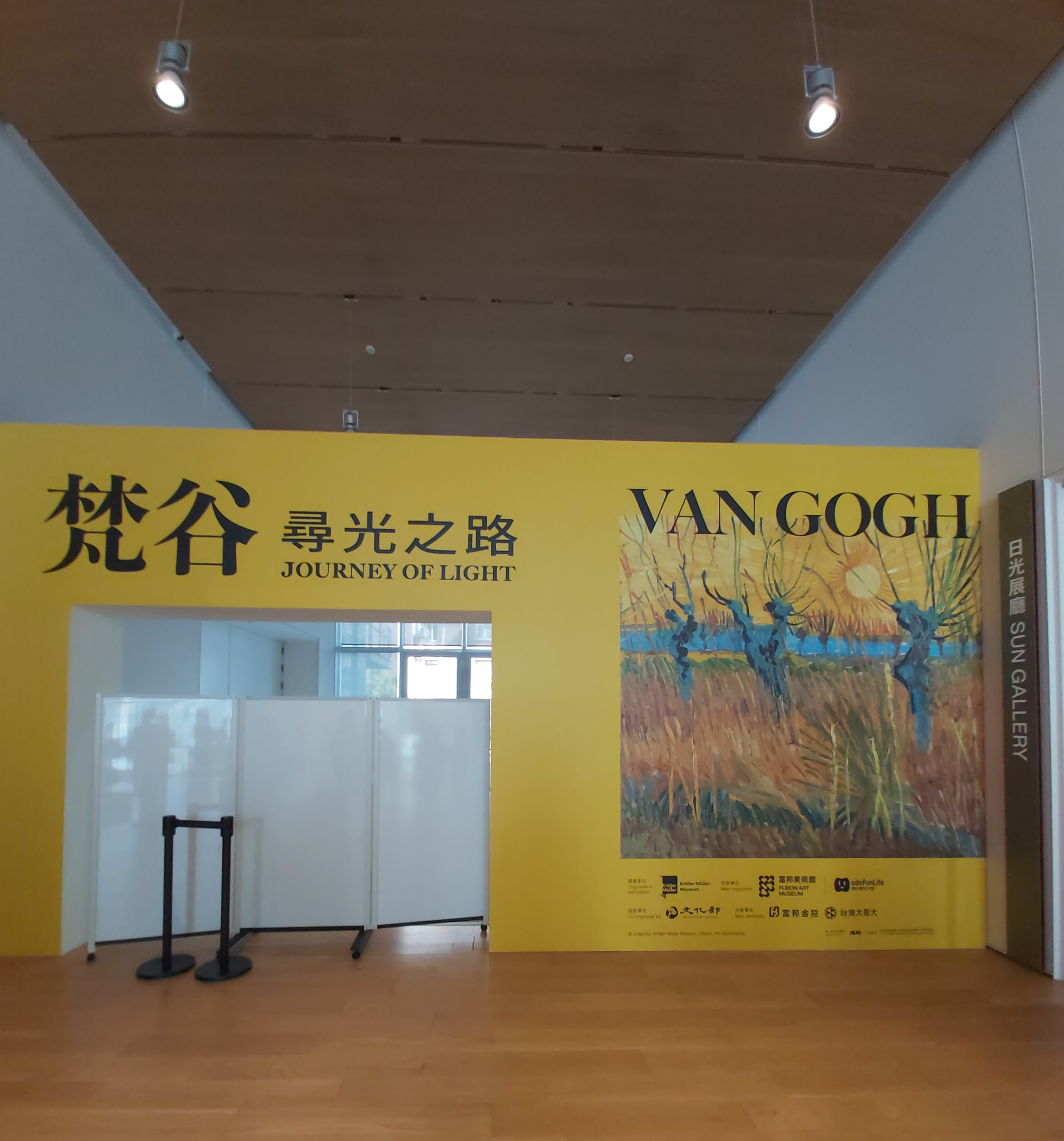
Sun Gallery

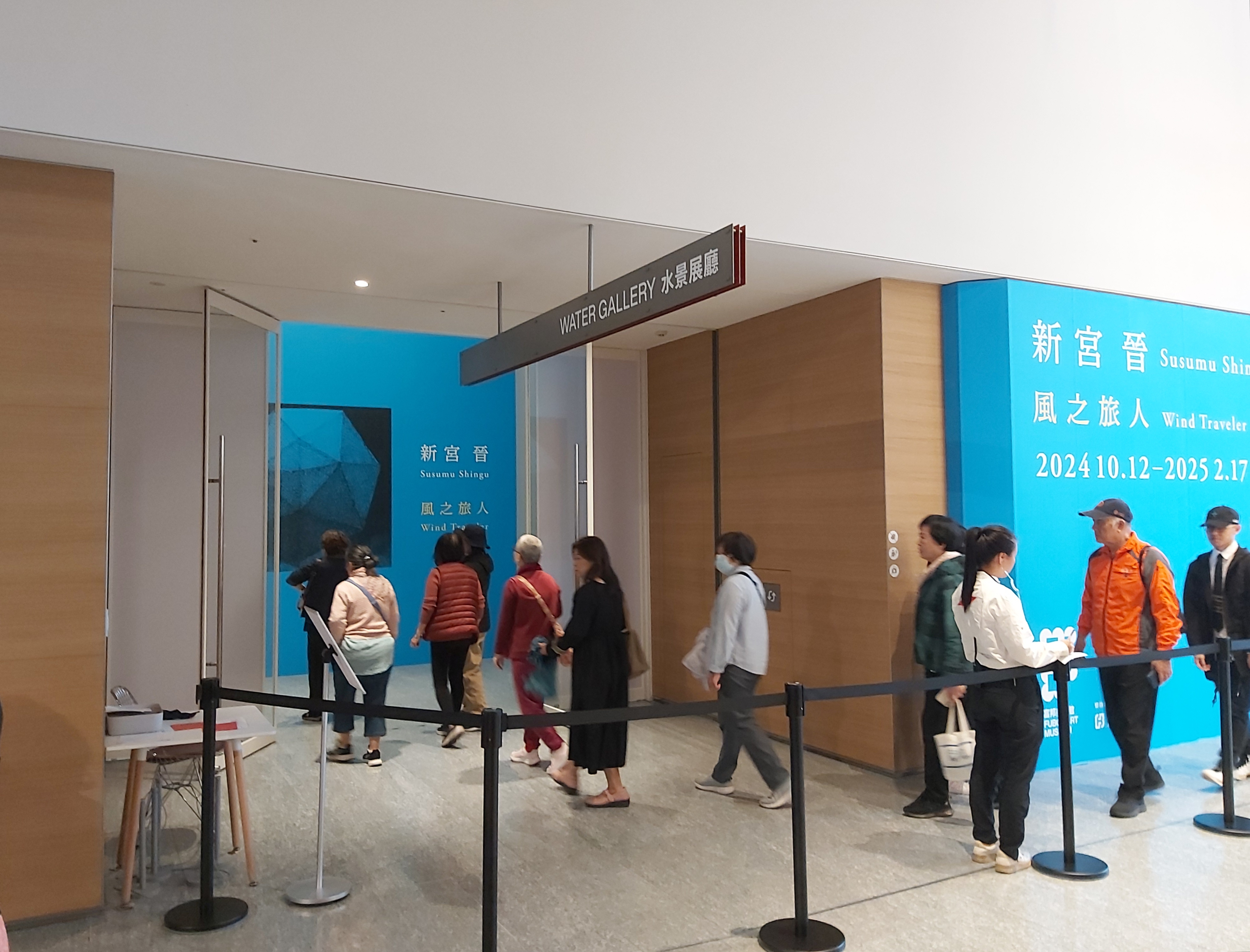
Water Gallery

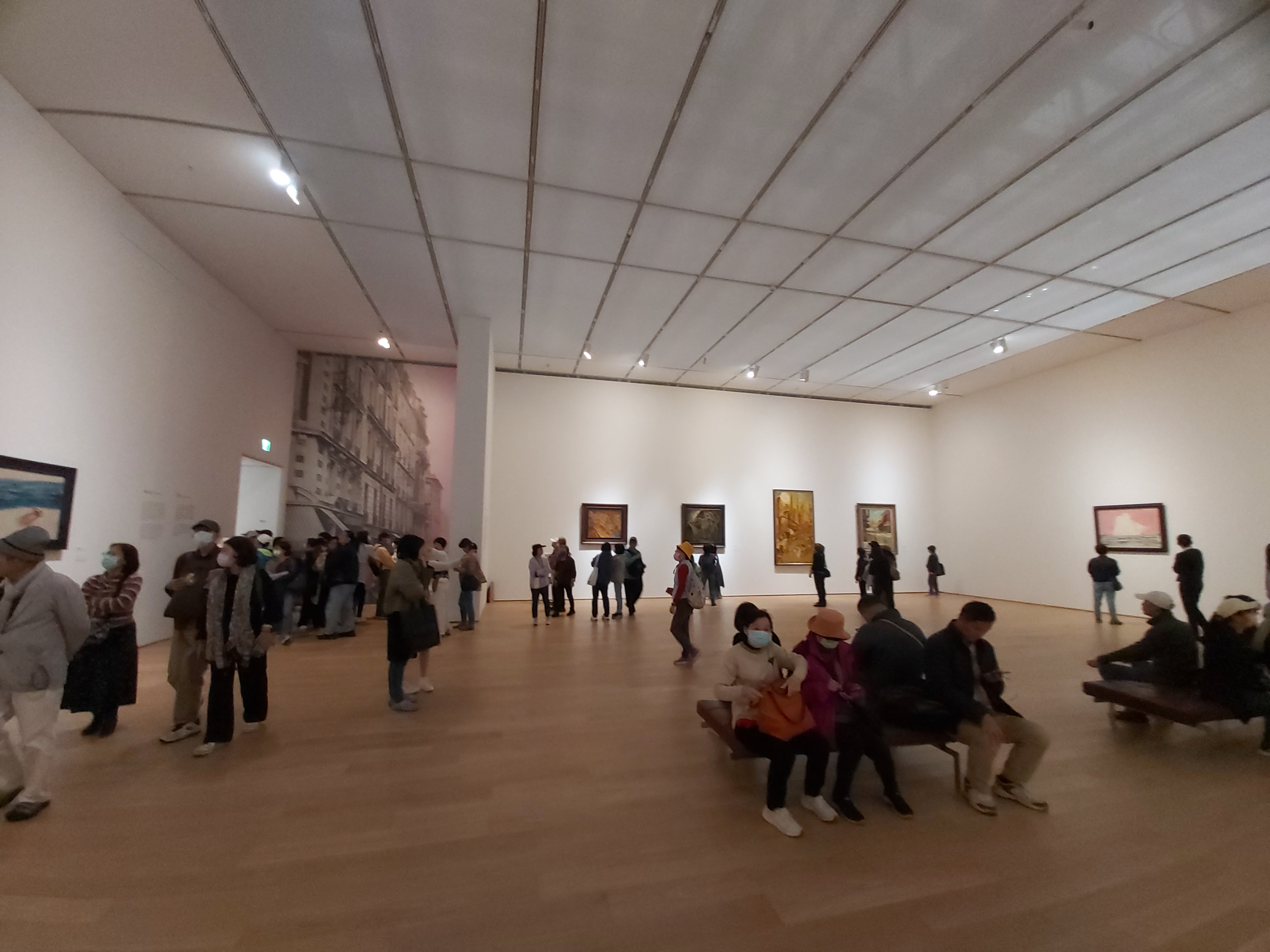
Star Gallery
