= Miaoli Ceramics Museum =

Museum in Gongguan, Miaoli County, Taiwan

- 苗栗陶瓷博物館
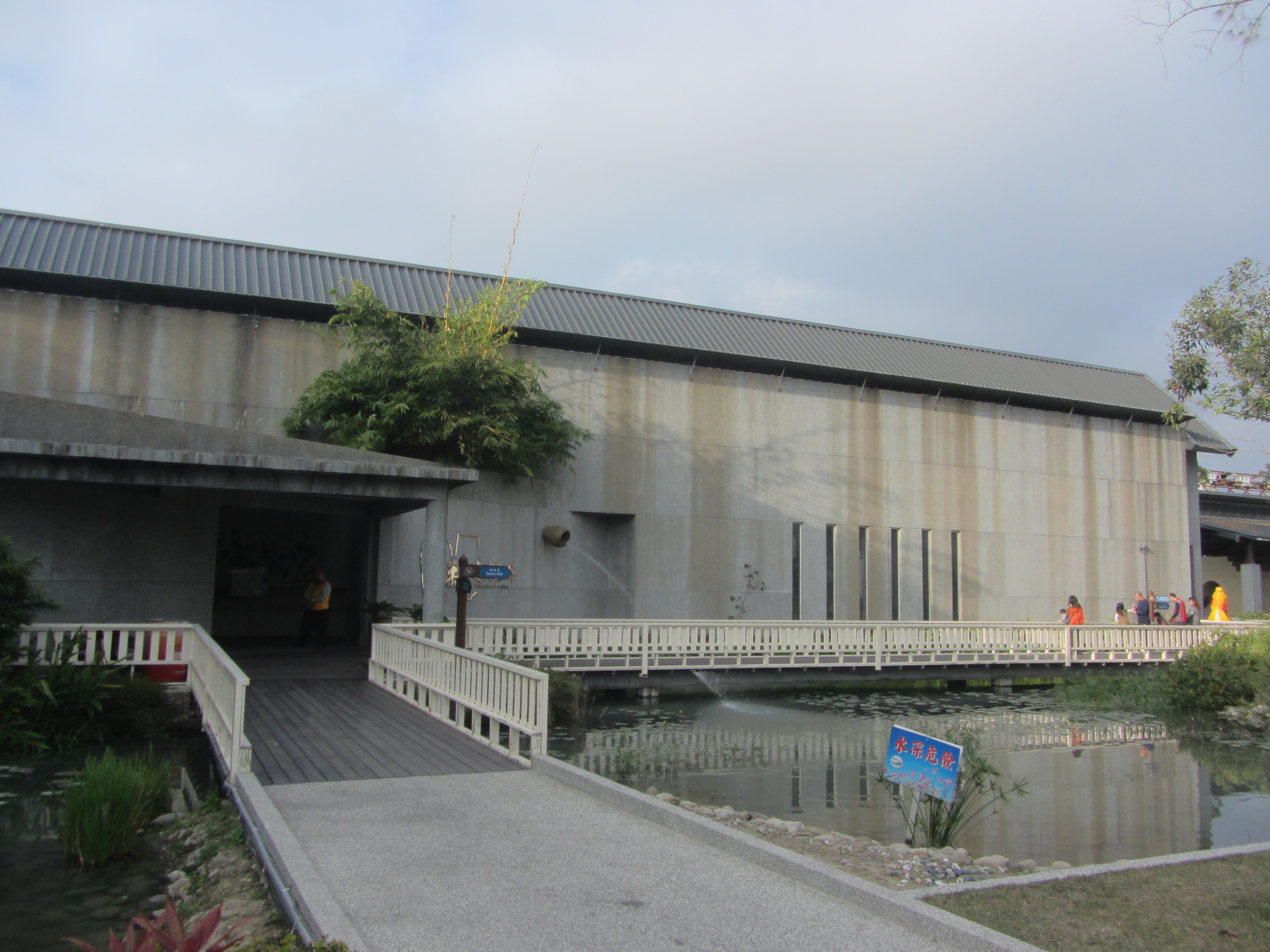
- Established: 2005
- Location: Gongguan, Miaoli County, Taiwan
- Coordinates: 24°29′23″N 120°49′41″E
- Type: museum

The Miaoli Pottery Museum or Miaoli Ceramics Museum (traditional Chinese: 苗栗陶瓷博物館; simplified Chinese: 苗栗陶瓷博物馆; pinyin: Miáolì Táocí Bówùguǎn) is a museum of pottery in Gongguan Township, Miaoli County, Taiwan.

== History ==
The construction of the museum was completed by the end of 2005.

== Architecture ==
The museum is housed in a 2-story building and spreads across a 2 hectares of area. It is located inside the Miaoli Travel Panorama Center, which also consists of a tourist information center, a restaurant and a gift shop. The museum includes the following themes, which are Home of Ceramics: Miaoli, Life of the Old Masterm Ceramics in Miaoli, Urn and Decorative Ceramics, Kilns in Miaoli, Traditional Ceramic Techniques and Modern Wood Burning.

== Exhibitions ==
The museum exhibits various relics of pottery and art works that represents the history and culture of Miaoli County. It also features special pottery exhibitions.

== Transportation ==
The museum is accessible east from Tongluo Station of the Taiwan Railway.

== See also ==
- List of museums in Taiwan
