= Chang Foundation Museum =

Museum in Zhongzheng, Taipei, Taiwan

Chang Foundation
- 財團法人鴻禧藝術文教基金會
- Established: 1988
- Location: Zhongzheng, Taipei, Taiwan
- Type: Art Foundation
- Website: Official website

Chang Foundation (traditional Chinese: 鴻禧藝術文教基金會; simplified Chinese: 鸿禧艺术文教基金会; pinyin: Hóngxǐ Yìshù Wénjiào Jījīn Huì) is a non-profit art foundation in Zhongzheng District, Taipei, Taiwan.

== History ==
The Chang Foundation was established in 1988 in Taipei, Taiwan. Its founder, T. K. Chang 張添根, was a lover of Chinese art and he had eagerly collected it over many years. His aim in creating the foundation was to stimulate interest in Chinese art by holding exhibitions and furthering education in this field.

In organizing exhibitions, lectures and other educational activities, the Chang Foundation continues to promote interest in, and appreciation of, Chinese art with the declared aim of making a contribution to society at large.

== Collection ==
The Chang Foundation collection is focused on traditional Chinese art and is divided into four main categories: 1. 19 th and 20 th century paintings, including works by Wu Changshuo, Qi Baishi, Fu Baoshi and Zhang Daqian. 2. Ceramics dating from the Jin dynasty (265 – 420 CE) to the Qianlong period (1736 – 1795). Within this category is an important body of reference material, the T. K. Chang Collection of ceramic sherds, many of which are from the original kiln sites in mainland China. 3. Scholars’ objects. 4. Tea utensils. The last two categories of collection reflect how Chinese scholars actually used the objects and how they saw them from an aesthetic standpoint.

== Exhibitions ==
The Chang Foundation has held a series of important loan exhibitions. Among these were significant loans from mainland China, including early Ming imperial porcelain (early 15 th century CE) excavated from the imperial kiln site at Jingdezhen, also bronze and lacquer burial items (circa 433 BCE) from the tomb of Marquis Zeng Houyi of the Warring States period. Since 1990s the Chang Foundation has continued to promote both cross-strait cultural exchanges and wider international exchanges. Overall it has focused on educational activities aimed at the general public, with emphasis on the historical function and meaning of Chinese art objects and their aesthetic value.
