= Taiwan Mochi Museum =

Museum in Nantou City, Nantou County, Taiwan

- 台灣麻糬主題館
- Established: 2011
- Location: Nantou City, Nantou County, Taiwan
- Coordinates: 23°55′17″N 120°40′07″E
- Type: food museum
- Website: Official website

The Taiwan Mochi Museum (traditional Chinese: 台灣麻糬主題館; simplified Chinese: 台湾麻糬主题馆; pinyin: Táiwān Máshu Zhǔtíguǎn) is a museum about mochi (rice cake) in Nantou City, Nantou County, Taiwan.

== History ==
The museum was established in 2011. In 2012, it won the championship of the 2012 Most Famous Tourist Factory in Taiwan.

== Architecture ==
The museum houses the factory to produce mochi. The education tours for the museum is located at the upper floor of the museum.

== Activities ==
The museum features various activities such as mochi tasting and mochi making workshops.

== See also ==
- List of museums in Taiwan
