= Muh Sheng Museum of Entomology =

Museum in Puli, Nantou County, Taiwan

- 木生昆蟲博物館
- Established: 1974
- Location: Puli, Nantou County, Taiwan
- Coordinates: 23°57′56″N 120°56′45″E
- Type: museum
- Website: Official website (in Chinese)

The Muh Sheng Museum of Entomology (traditional Chinese: 木生昆蟲博物館; simplified Chinese: 木生昆虫博物馆; pinyin: Mùshēng Kūnchóng Bówùguǎn) is a museum of entomology (especially butterflies, used for handicrafts) in Puli Township, Nantou County, Taiwan.

== History ==
The museum was established in 1974.

== Exhibitions ==
The museum holds more than 16,000 insect specimens in their exhibition displays, including more than 350 species of butterflies and moths, both indoor and outdoor.

== Transportation ==
The museum is accessible by bus from Taichung Station of Taiwan Railway.

== See also ==
- List of museums in Taiwan
