= Cijin Shell Museum =

Museum in Qijin, Kaohsiung, Taiwan

- 旗津貝殼博物館
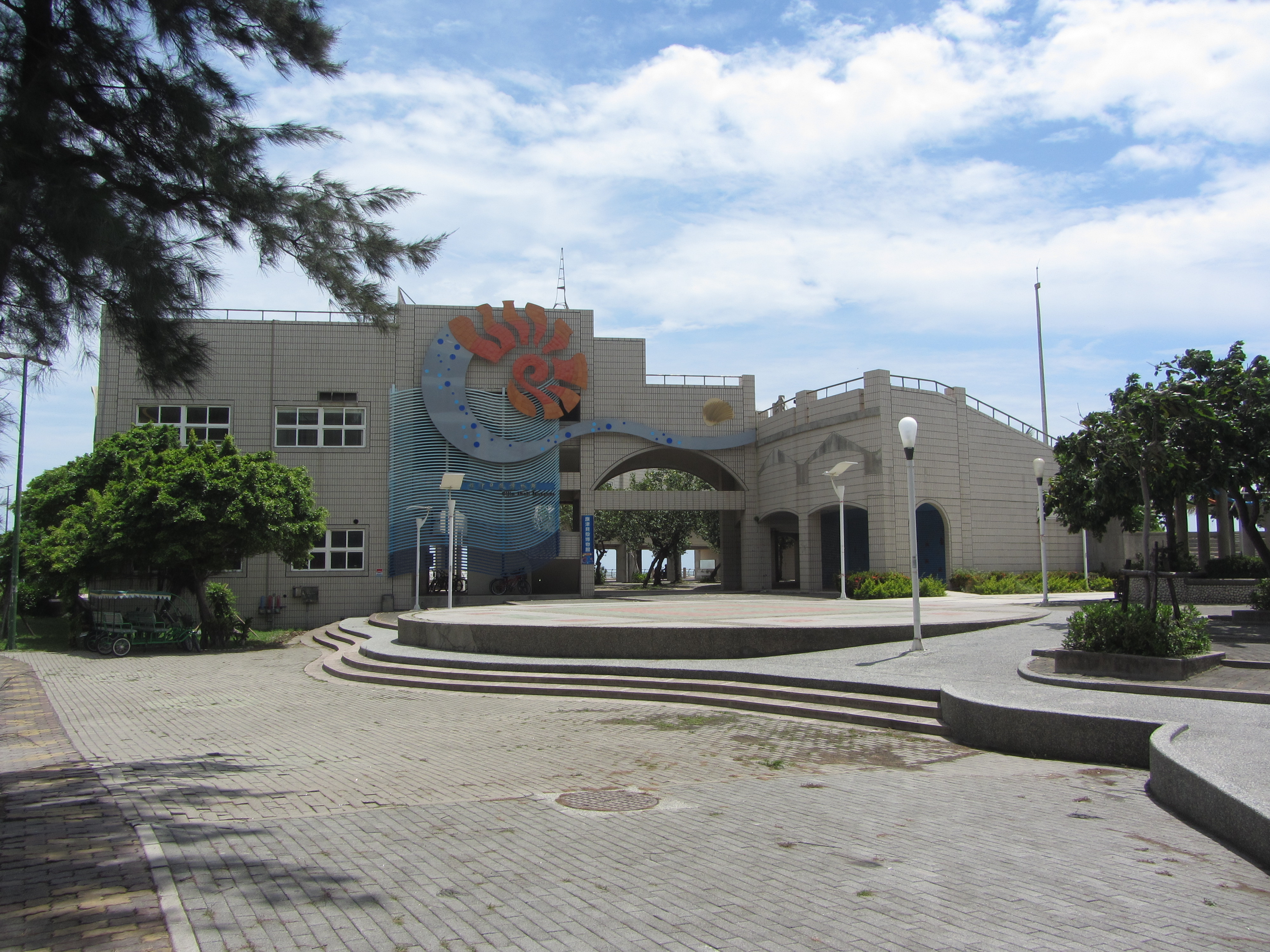
- Established: 11 September 2000
- Location: Cijin, Kaohsiung, Taiwan
- Coordinates: 22°36′04.6″N 120°16′27.1″E
- Type: museum

The Cijin Shell Museum (traditional Chinese: 旗津貝殼博物館; simplified Chinese: 旗津贝壳博物馆; Hanyu Pinyin: Qíjīn Bèiké Bówùguǎn; Tongyong Pinyin: Cíjin Bèiké Bówùguǎn) is a museum in Cijin District, Kaohsiung, Taiwan.

== History ==
The original Cijin Shell Museum opened on 11 September 2000, on the second floor of the Cijin Seaside Park administration building. After the original museum became too small, the Kaohsiung City Government started building the new museum in 2009, opening it in October 2011.

== Architecture ==
The museum building occupies the top floor of the white, gray-blue and light blue building. The ground floor of the building is the Cijin Seaside Park tourist service center.

== Exhibition ==
The museum houses more than 200 kinds of shrimps and crabs specimens as well as more than 2,000 kinds of shellfish specimens, including three kinds of 'living fossil' Nautilus.

== Opening hours ==
The museum is open from 9AM to 5PM, from Tuesday to Saturday. The museum is closed on Mondays.

== See also ==
- List of museums in Taiwan
