= Beneficial Microbes Museum and Tourism Factory =

Museum in Yilan City, Yilan County, Taiwan

- 菌寶貝博物館暨觀光工廠
- Established: January 2011
- Location: Yilan City, Yilan County, Taiwan
- Coordinates: 24°46′35″N 121°44′07″E
- Type: museum
- Owner: Bionin Biotechnology Inc.
- Website: Official website

The Beneficial Microbes Museum and Tourism Factory (BMM; traditional Chinese: 菌寶貝博物館暨觀光工廠; simplified Chinese: 菌宝贝博物馆暨观光工厂; pinyin: Jūnbǎobèi Bówùguǎn Jì Guānguāng Gōngchǎng) is a museum in Yilan City, Yilan County, Taiwan. The museum is the first microorganism museum in Taiwan.

== Name ==
The name of the museum reflects its literal meaning of "bacteria treasure" in Taiwanese and its homonym of "very precious" in Taiwanese.

== Objective ==
The museum aims to help providing a further understanding about bacteria, so that instead of knowing only about harmful bacteria in nature, the general public will be able to recognize some of the beneficial microbes for human life and then relieve their fears or phobias.

== History ==
In January 2011, the Bionin Biotechnology Inc. called for a group of experts in microorganism from Taiwan and the United States to found the Bionin Biotechnology Tourism Factory and Beneficial Microbes Museum.

== Transportation ==
The museum is accessible by bus from Yilan railway station of Taiwan Railway.

== See also ==
- List of museums in Taiwan
