= Suho Memorial Paper Museum =

Museum in Zhongshan, Taipei, Taiwan

- 樹火紀念紙博物館
- Established: October 1995
- Location: Zhongshan, Taipei, Taiwan
- Coordinates: 25°02′53.6″N 121°32′01.2″E
- Type: museum
- Website: Official website

The Suho Memorial Paper Museum (traditional Chinese: 樹火紀念紙博物館; simplified Chinese: 树火纪念纸博物馆; pinyin: Shùhuǒ Jìniàn Zhǐ Bówùguǎn) is a museum about paper in Zhongshan District, Taipei, Taiwan.

== History ==
The idea of the paper museum establishment was voiced by Chen Su-ho, the founder of Chang Chuen Cotton Paper. However, he died in an airplane accident in October 1990 in Guangdong. Soon after that, the preparation to establish the museum took off. The museum was finally opened in October 1995 after five years of preparation with the name Suho Memorial Paper Museum.

== Architecture ==
The museum is housed in a 4-story building with a total floor area of 529 m^{2}. It features a shop.

== Exhibitions ==
- Show room and paper mill
- Suho platform special exhibition
- Permanent exhibition area of the museum
- Activity experience area

== Transportation ==
The museum is accessible within walking distance south from Songjiang Nanjing Station of the Taipei Metro.

== See also ==
- List of museums in Taiwan
