= Taiwan Times Village =

Museum in Caotun, Nantou County, Taiwan

- 寶島時代村
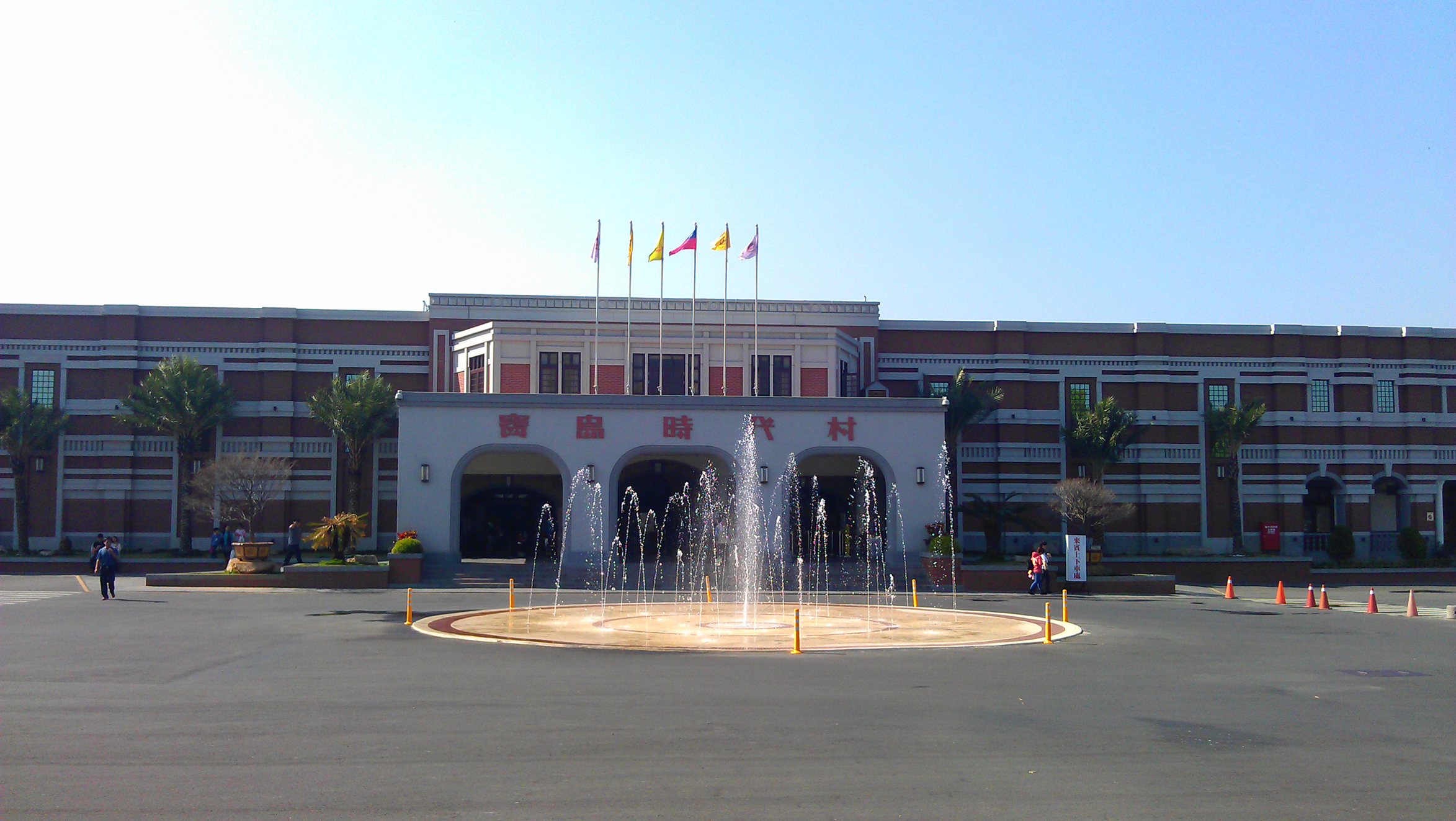
- Location: Caotun, Nantou County, Taiwan
- Coordinates: 23°59′16.6″N 120°41′12.3″E
- Type: museum
- Website: Official website (in Chinese)

The Taiwan Times Village (traditional Chinese: 寶島時代村; simplified Chinese: 宝岛时代村; pinyin: Bǎodǎo Shídài Cūn) is a museum in Caotun Township, Nantou County, Taiwan.

== Exhibitions ==
The museums exhibits the past life of Taiwan, which includes the life of Hakka, Hoklo, Taiwanese aborigines and veterans from Mainland China in different community blocks.

== Transportation ==
The museum is accessible from Highway 3.

== See also ==
- List of museums in Taiwan
