= Children's Museum of Taipei =

The Children's Museum of Taipei (CMOT; Chinese: 兒童探索博物館; pinyin: Értóng Tànsuǒ Bówùguǎn) was a children's museum in Taipei, Taiwan. The museum opened on December 16, 2005, and closed on November 5, 2008.

The museum featured five themes: science, art, nature, culture, and toddlers' exploration.
