= Dalinpu =

Settlement in Kaohsiung, Taiwan

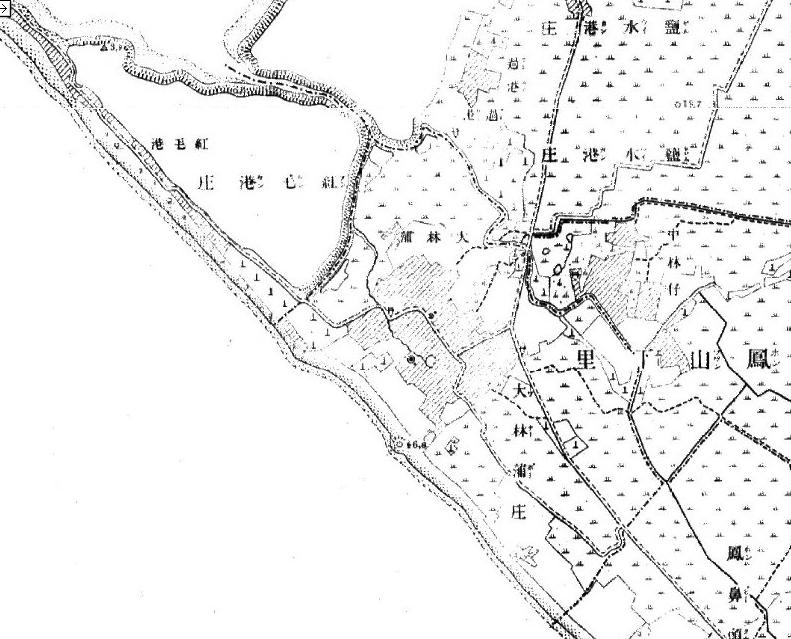
- Dalinpu in Taiwan Fort Map
- Hàn-jī: 大林蒲
- Pe̍h-ōe-jī: Tōa-nâ-pô͘
- Tâi-lô: Tuā-nâ-pôo

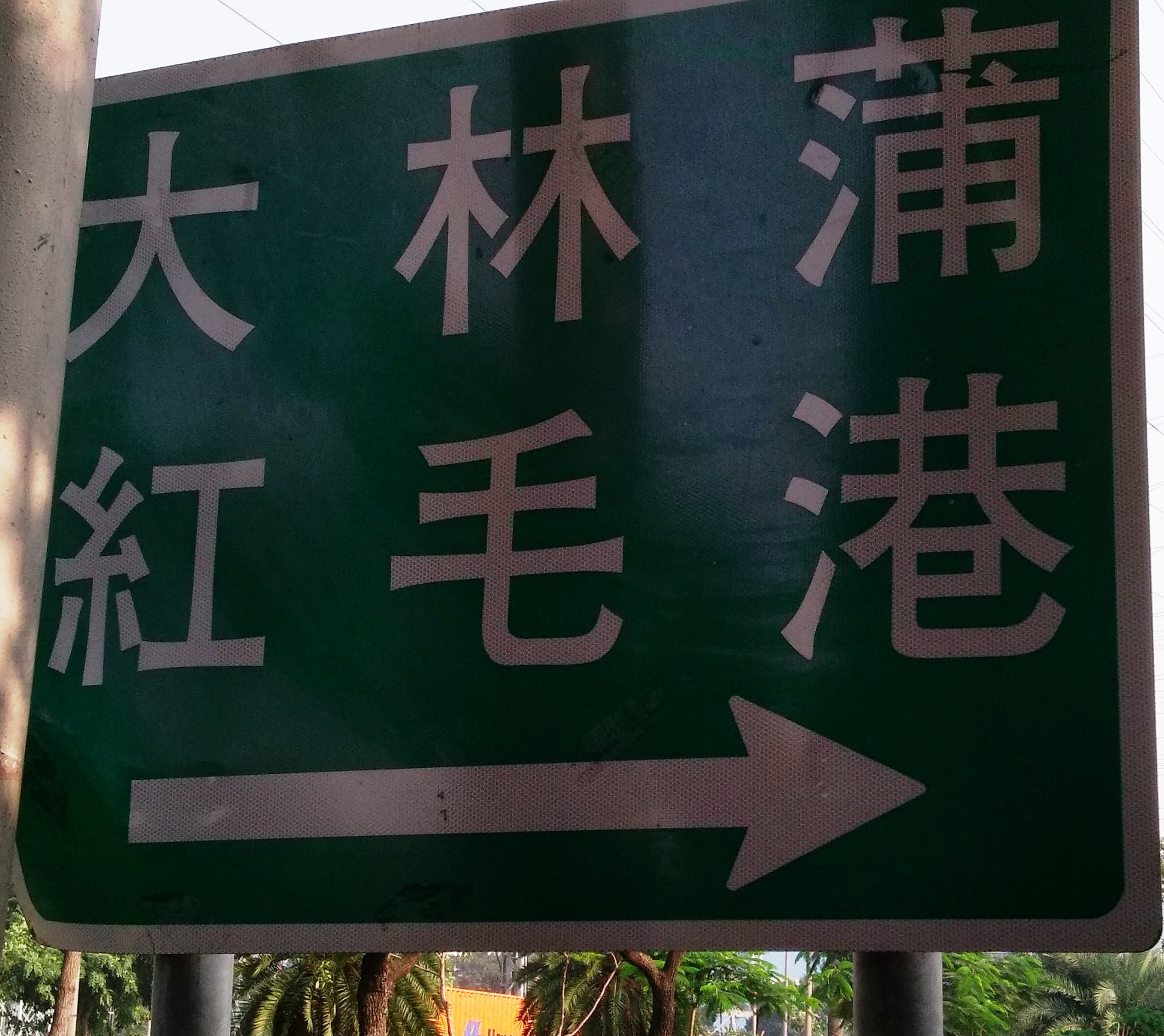
A signboard on Yanhai 2nd Road with the name of Dalinpu

Dalinpu (Chinese: 大林蒲; Pe̍h-ōe-jī: Tōa-nâ-pô͘) is a coastal settlement located in Siaogang District, Kaohsiung, Taiwan. It is bordered by the Taiwan Strait to the southwest, Kaohsiung Linhai Industrial Park to the east, Hongmaogang, which has been relocated, to the north, and Bangkeng and Fengbitou to the south. Large-scale factories in or adjacent to Dalinpu include CPC Dalin Refinery, Taipower Talin Power Plant and China Steel.

== History ==
=== Founding ===
In 1661 (15th year of Yongli Period), the founders of Dalinpu followed Koxinga, Prince of Yanping, to expel the Dutch East India Company from Taiwan. They came to Taiwan from Zhangzhou, Fujian Province and landed at Qieqingbian on the west coast. The place they decided to settle had lush wild forests and grass ponds, so they named the place "Dashulin", meaning "great forest", or "Dalinpu", meaning "great forest and grass pond".

=== Settlement ===
In 1837 (17th year of Daoguang's reign), Cao Jin, the county magistrate for Fengshan County, built a large water pump at the foot of⁣⁣ Fengbitou⁣⁣ Mountain for the newly excavated Caogong Canal. Residents in Zhonglinzi and Zhuigangzai were superstitious and believed the dragon veins were damaged, and they felt a sense of foreboding in the place, so they moved to Dalinpu one after another to settle down.

The new residents decided to replace the character "pu" (Chinese: 埔), meaning grassland, in the name Dalinpu, with another character also pronounced "pu" (Chinese: 蒲). This new character "pu" is the character for the plant calamus, an herb that was believed to have the ability to exorcise evil spirits.

During the period of Taiwan under Qing rule, Dalinpu was famous for the saying "top Chong, bottom Pu". "Chong" refers to the settlement of Youchong, which is now called Youchang; "Pu" refers to Dalinpu. Both places were equally famous for "Feijicuo", which were roof ridges that looked like they were "flying" left and right of the roof, similar to temple roofs. These roof ridges were symbols of achieving success in the imperial examination. In the traditional era when "everything else is low-grade, only reading is good", it is rumored that during the Jiaqing period, there were two Jinshi scholars that came out of Dalinpu, including Wu Fengming and Chen Made, as well as a scholar-official called Qiu Wen.

However, according to studies conducted later on in history, it was discovered that during the Jiaqing period, there were no Jinshi scholars in Taiwan, and those two scholars were not listed as Jinshi scholars. The truth was the so-called "Jinshi" scholars were actually just "Suigong" scholars. Since the people at that time did not know much about the imperial examination, they mistakenly thought that Suigong scholars were Jinshi scholars.

According to the census in 1933, Dalinpu had a population of 2,454.

=== Relocation ===
==== Background ====
Just a single propylene pipeline blown up in the urban area can cause a situation like this. There are hundreds of pipelines under Dalinpu. The people's panic is indescribable.

— Hsu Zai-sheng, villiage representative of Fenglin Village, in an interview on 17 August 2014 about the 2014 Kaohsiung gas explosions

Following the completion of the relocation of nearby Hongmaogang Village in 2007, relocating Dalinpu started to became a topic of discussion among the residents. Dalinpu, similar to Hongmaogang Village, is also surrounded by heavy industrial zones.

In 2014 and the years after, many issues caused the topic of relocation of Dalinpu to escalate. These issues included:

- Environmental issues of the new yacht industrial park planned by Nanxing Project, a land reclamation project that consists of filling 3,000 hectares of ocean near Dalinpu to extending the coast 3 kilometers outwards
- A series of road collapses between 2015 and 2016 on Zhonglin Road, the main transportation road from Dalinpu to Kaohsiung City
- The 2014 Kaohsiung gas explosions, a series of explosions caused by a gas leak from an industrial pipeline buried beneath residential areas, killing 32 people and injuring more than 300 people

These issues highlighted the safety and environmental risks of Dalinpu residents living in close proximity with the industrial zones. Therefore, when the Kaohsiung City Government conducted public opinion surveys in 2011 and 2016 with the Dalinpu residents on their willingness of relocation, more than 70% of the residents stated they agree to relocate.

==== During the presidency of Tsai Ing-wen ====
After the 2016 Taiwanese presidential election, the plan regained the support of the central government. On 19 November 2016, Premier Lin Chuan led the Kaohsiung mayor Chen Chu, the chairmen of CPC Corporation, China Steel, Taipower, and the general manager of the Taiwan International Ports Corporation to come to Dalinpu to talk with the residents. They bowed to the residents to apologize for the pollution the local area has endured for many years.

In 2017, the Kaohsiung City Government, which received support of the central government, held a number of village relocation census briefings in Dalinpu and Fengbitou, and began to conduct the village relocation census.

==== Approval ====
On 8 October 2019, the Executive Yuan approved the "New Material Circulation Industrial Park Application and Establishment Plan" with a total budget of NT$105.4 billion, of which NT$58.9 billion will be used for the Dalinpu Village Relocation Project. The preliminary plan is to resettle the residents of Dalinpu to 52.4 hectares of land on the north side of Kaohsiung International Airport, managed by the Maritime and Port Bureau and the Taiwan Sugar Corporation. The residential and commercial land owned by the residents of Dalinpu will be exchanged "one ping for one ping", which means they will owned the same area of land in the new location. The current number of households to be relocated is 11,753 households, involving more than 20,000 people.

After taking office in 2020, the new Kaohsiung mayor Chen Chi-mai became more active in communicating and coordinating with the central government and ministries, and confirmed matters such as expropriation compensation and rental subsidies for village relocation.

In December 2023, the Executive Yuan approved to increase the budget for village relocation to NT$80 billion. In January 2024, the Ministry of Economic Affairs confirmed the village relocation and resettlement plan. In February, a survey on the selection of village relocation plans was launched. The final two candidate sites for resettlement are the land owned by Taisugar in Zhongluun, Fengshan District (next to Cingnian Night Market), as well as the merged area of state-owned land behind Niuliao, Fengshan District and behind the SKM Park in Cianjhen District, which is called Gangshanjai New Community, the resettlement area of the Hongmaogang Village Relocation Project.

== Religious culture ==
=== Dalinpu Fenglin Temple ===
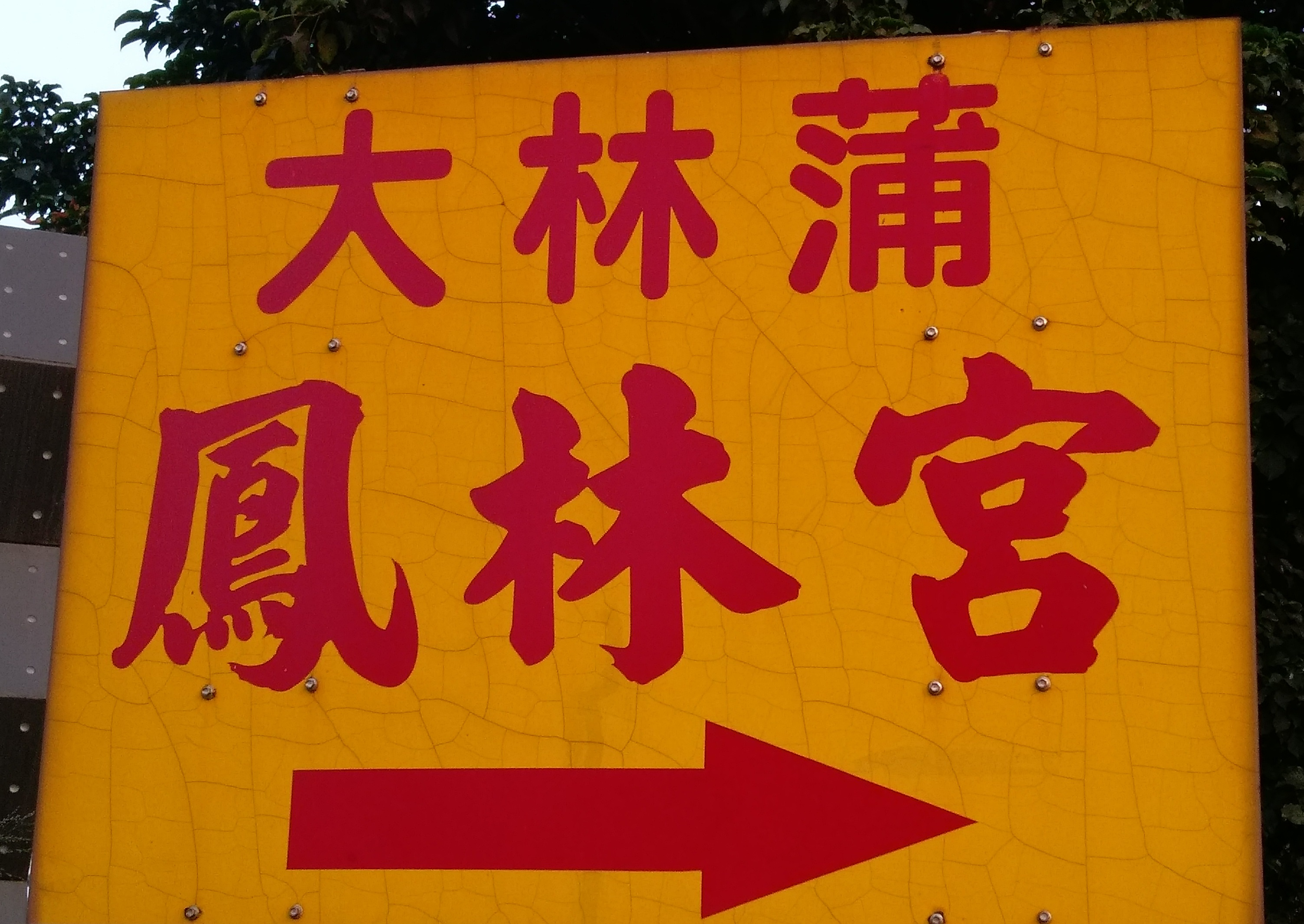
The signboard of Dalinpu Fenglin Temple located on the safety island of Coastal 2nd Road

The Dalinpu Fenglin Temple is the biggest temple in Dalinpu, and just like the religious culture in other areas of Taiwan, the temple also serves as the main activities hub for the local people in Dalinpu.

The history of Fenglin Temple can be traced back to 1697 (36th year of Kangxi'sreign), it mainly enshrines three Ong Yah deities, Wenfu, Zhufu and Chifu Qiansui. Therefore, the temple is often referred as the "Three Ong Yah Temple".

In 1974 (Minguo 63rd year), in order for the government to develop the Linhai Industrial Park, part of the land at the old site of Fenglin Temple was expropriated. In view of the deteriorsting condition of the temple building, the believers of the temple initiated a fundraising campaign for reconstruction, which was completed in 1978 (Minguo 67th year).

Fenglin Temple is located on the second floor of the new building, the first floor serves as a public square where most local residents often rest and chat. There is a small stage in the public square in front of the temple, and many set up stalls here. In addition to the daily morning market, there is also a night market in the temple square every Thursday, which can be said to be the most popular place for economic activities in Dalinpu.

== See also ==
- Linhai Industrial Park
- Talin Power Plant
- Dalin Refinery
