= Linhai Industrial Park =

Industrial park in Kaohsiung, Taiwan

Linhai Industrial Park 臨海工業區
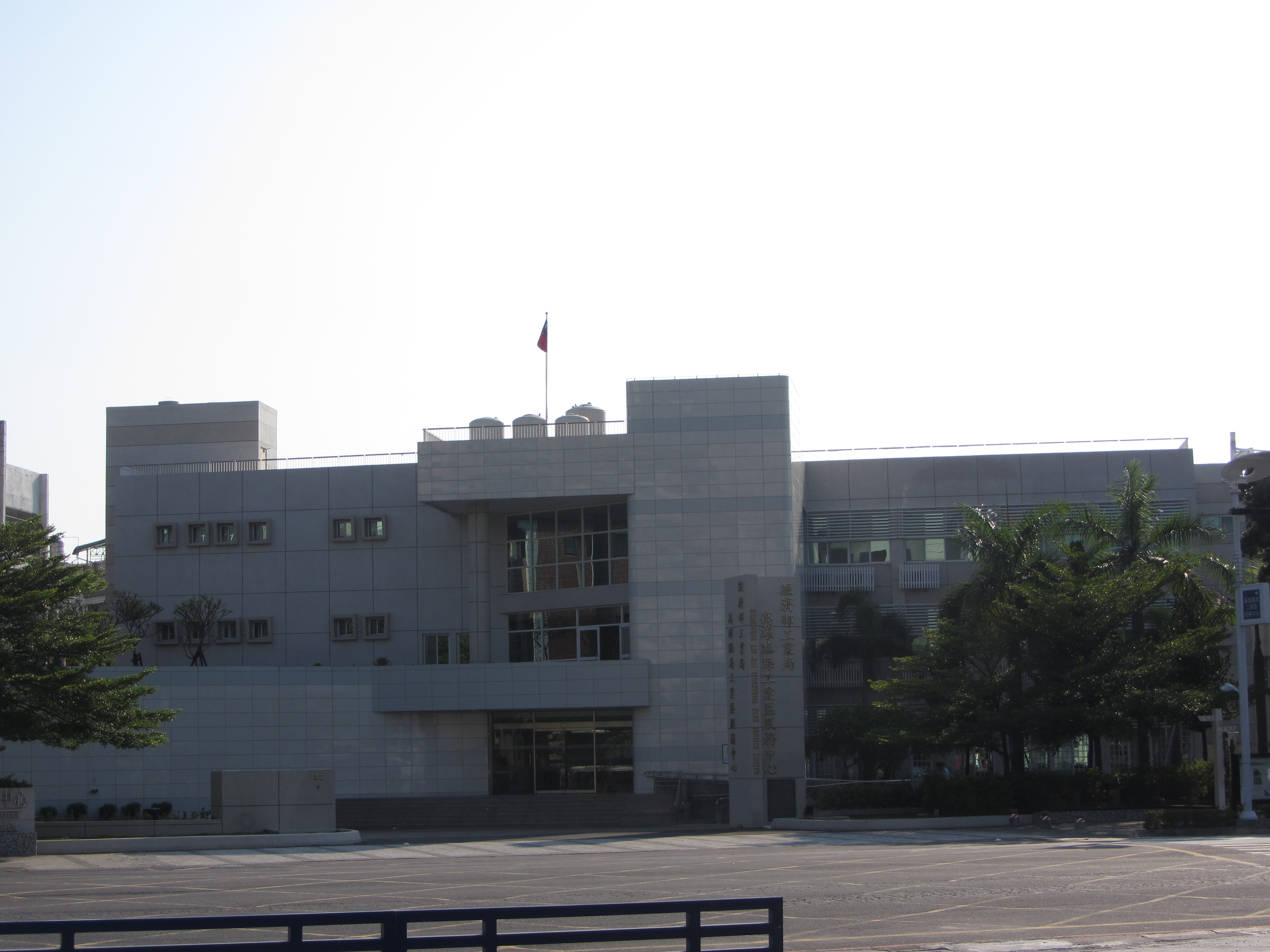
- Linhai Industrial Park Service Center

- Taiwan
- Location: Siaogang and Cianjhen in Kaohsiung, Taiwan
- Coordinates: 22°32′03.9″N 120°22′03.1″E
- Opening date: January 1972

The Linhai Industrial Park (Chinese: 臨海工業區; pinyin: Línhǎi Gōngyè Qū) is an industrial park located in Siaogang District and Cianjhen District of Kaohsiung, Taiwan. It near the Kaohsiung International Airport, No. 5 Container Center of Port of Kaohsiung and the terminal of National Highway No. 1. The Talin Power Plant, a fossil fuel power plant, is located near the park. And a reservoir called Fengshan Reservoir is to the south of park.

Linhai Industrial Park is a major cluster of heavy industry in Taiwan. There are several of the largest producers in their industries situated in this industrial park, such as China Steel (steelmaker), CSBC Corporation (ship builder) and CPC Corporation (oil refiner). Furthermore, Linhai Industrial Park also has some manufacturers of machinery, steel, transportation and chemical industry.

== History ==
The industrial park was originally established in 1960 and completed in January 1972.

== Transportation ==
The area is accessible within walking distance south of Siaogang Station of Kaohsiung MRT.

== See also ==
- Economy of Taiwan
