= Fengbitou =

Settlement in Kaohsiung, Taiwan

- Map showing Kaohsiung, Taiwan
- Coordinates: 22°30′51″N 120°21′13″E

Fengbitou (Chinese: 鳳鼻頭; Pe̍h-ōe-jī: Hōng-phīⁿ-thâu) is an area in Siaogang District, Kaohsiung City, located at the southernmost end of the district. Compared with today's administrative area, its scope roughly includes the southeast of Dapingli and the northeast of Pingdingli.

== Etymology ==
Fengbitou got its name because it is located at the foot of the mountain in front of Fengbi Mountain, and because the ancestors often used heads and tails to indicate relative positions when they built settlements.

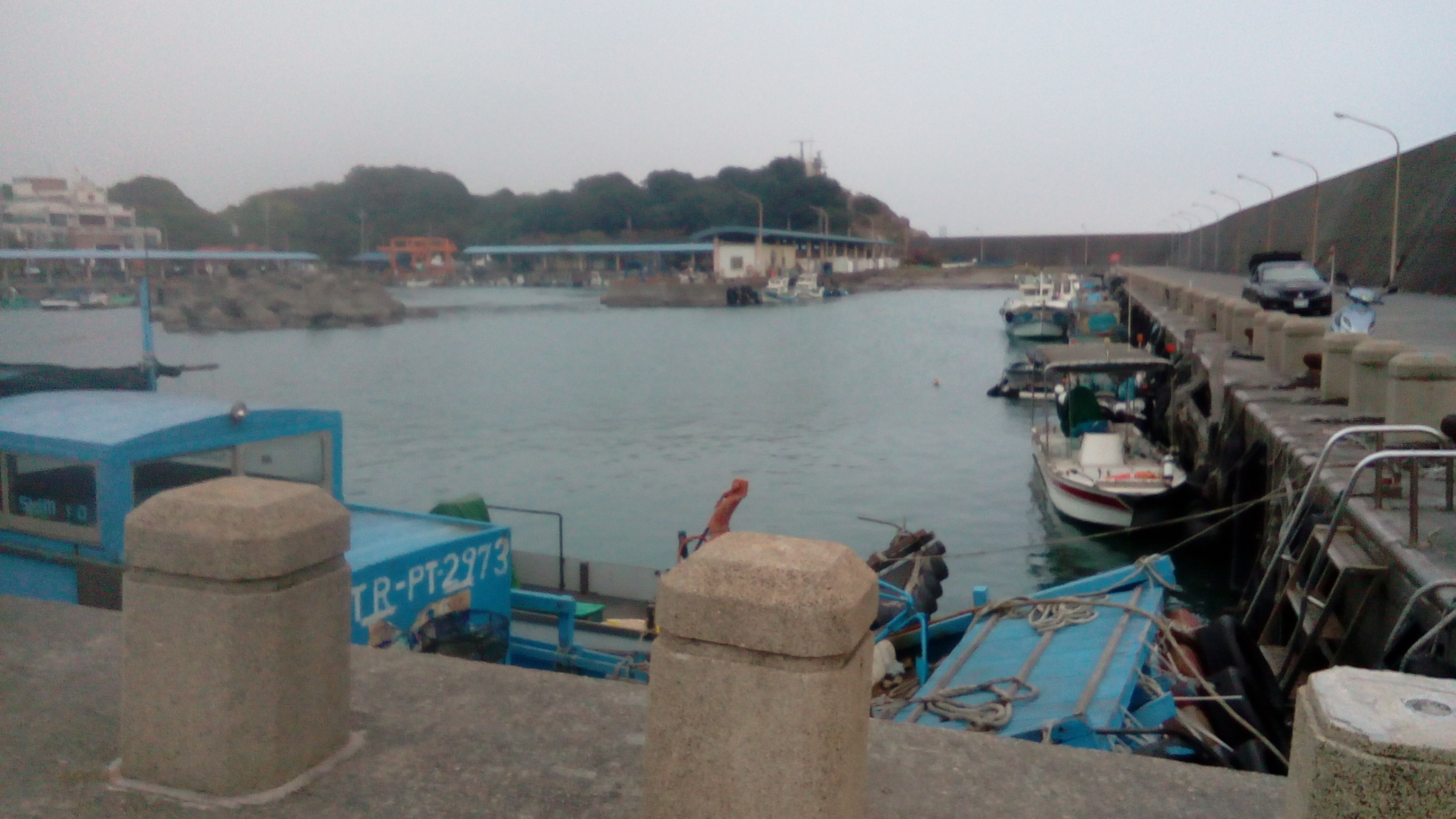
View of Fengbitou Hill from the mouth of the harbor

== History ==
From the end of the Qing Dynasty to the early days of the Japanese rule in Taiwan, the Fengbitou area was a street village, called "Xibiancuo Village", which was affiliated to the lower area of Fenshan Mountain. The village is adjacent to Dalin Puzhuang to the northwest, Zhonglin Zaizhuang to the north and northeast, Wanggongmiao Village to the east for a short section, Hong Kong Puzhuang to the southeast, and the Taiwan Strait to the southwest.

In November 1901 (the 34th year of the Meiji era period under the Japanese rule), all the county offices in Taiwan were abolished and restructured into twenty halls, and the village was affiliated with Fengshan Hall. In June 1903 (the 36th year of Meiji), the village was incorporated into the "Obayashi Kama Ward" and was affiliated with Douliu Hall. In October 1909 (the 42nd year of Meiji), the 20th Hall was merged into the 12th Hall, and the Dalinpu District was transferred to the Tainan Hall. In 1920 (the 9th year of Taishō era), Taiwan's local system underwent major reforms. The Twelve Halls were abolished and replaced by the Wuzhou Hall and the Second Hall. The village was renamed "Fengbitou" with large characters and was affiliated to Xiaogang Village, Fengshan County, Takao Prefecture.

Historical pictures
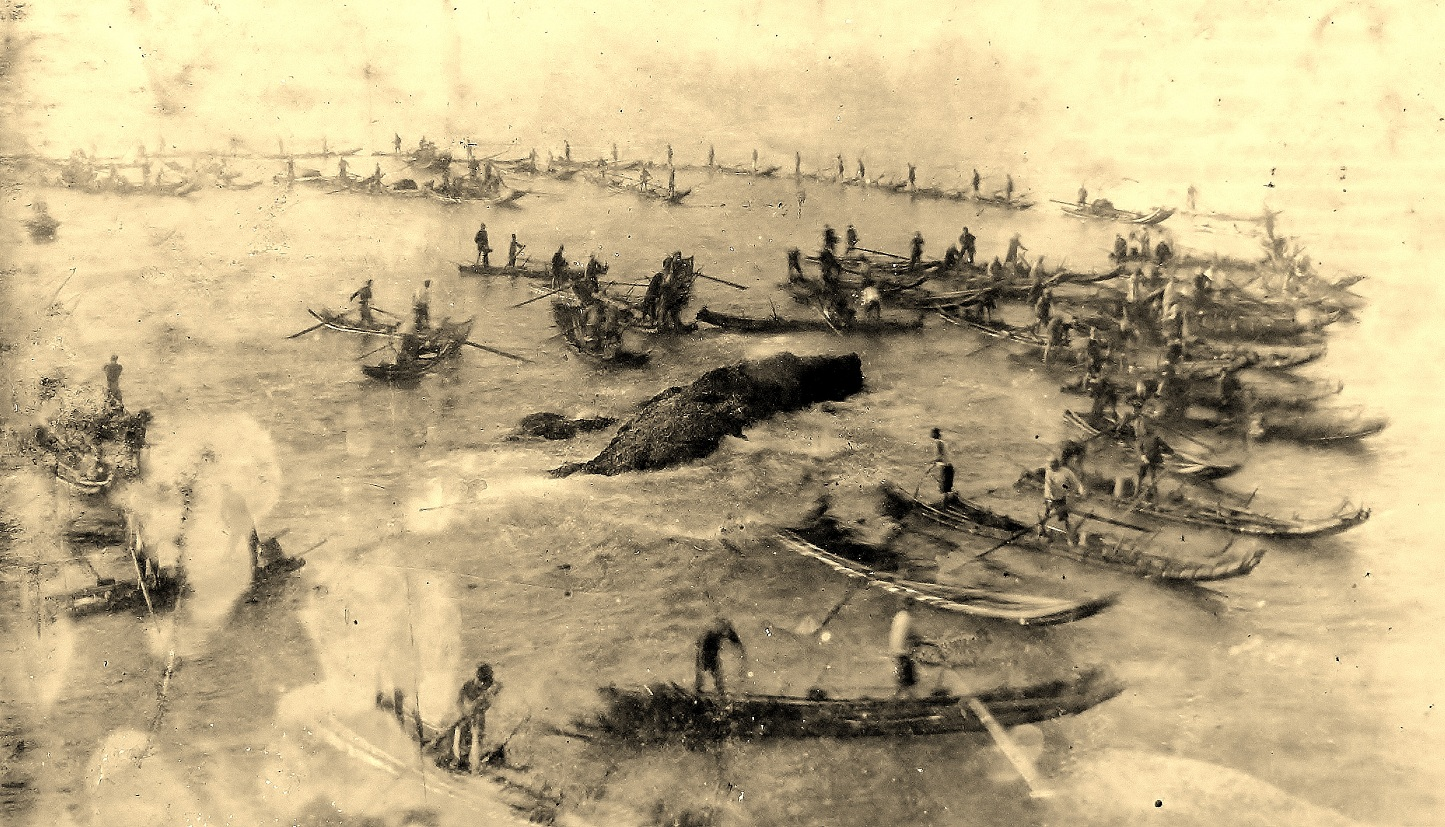
Fengbitou people catch mullet around the reef in front of Shanzaitou

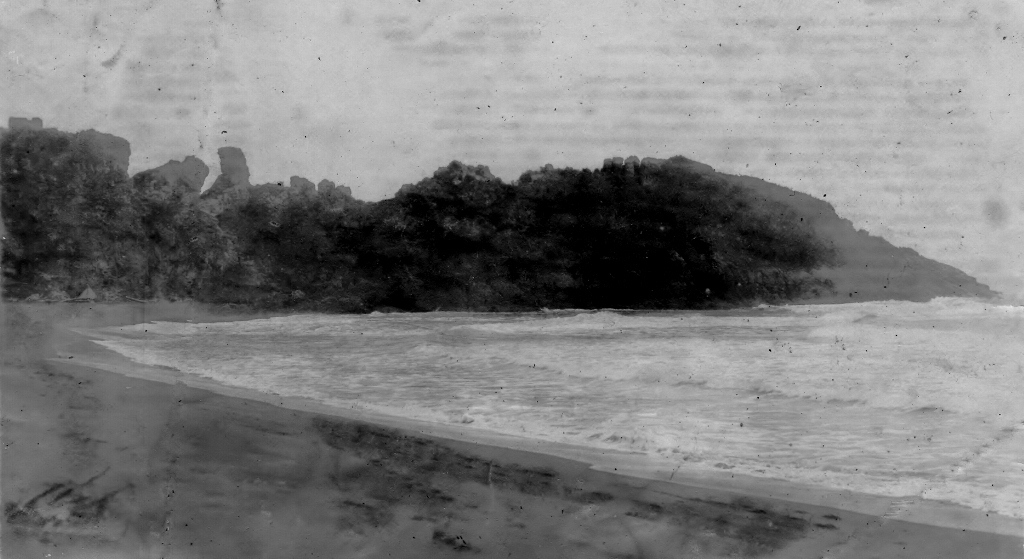
Fengbitou Shanzaitou and beach during the Japanese colonial period

== Industry ==
During the Qing Dynasty, most of the residents in Fengbitou made a living by fishing. During the Taiwan under Japanese rule, agriculture and fishing industry were mixed, and it was commonly known as "Hai Shan Hai". From north to south, Fengbitou has three corner positions: "Bangkengzi", "Dingtou" and "Xiatou" (or "Jiaotou", which means a certain place in the settlement).

== Transportation ==
In the summer vacation of 2017, the Fengbitou-Liuqiu Island regular ferry service officially started sailing.

== Cultural assets ==
- Fengbitou Archaeological Site (national heritage site): It is located in the Wanggong Temple area to the east, very close to the Fengbitou area.
