= Dapingding Tropical Botanical Garden =

Garden in Xiaogang, Kaohsiung, Taiwan

- 大坪頂熱帶植物園
- Interactive map of Dapingding Tropical Botanical Garden
- Type: garden
- Location: Siaogang, Kaohsiung, Taiwan
- Coordinates: 22°33′21.7″N 120°23′23.8″E
- Area: 9.6 hectares (24 acres)
- Public transit: Siaogang Station

The Dapingding Tropical Botanical Garden (traditional Chinese: 大坪頂熱帶植物園; simplified Chinese: 大坪顶热带植物园; pinyin: Dàpíngdǐng Rèdài Zhíwùyuán) is a garden in Siaogang District, Kaohsiung, Taiwan which is used as a museum of tropical plants and a recreational park.

== Architecture ==
The garden has an area of 9.6 hectares with rich ecological resources and various terrains, such as hills, lowlands and tablelands. The garden features ecology exposition center, green path, observation deck, wood bridges, pavilions, forest education center and four theme areas for exhibition, preservation of tropical plants, ecological education and tourism.

== Transportation ==
The park is accessible east of Siaogang Station of Kaohsiung Metro.

== See also ==
- List of parks in Taiwan
