= Ouk =

Ouk or OUK may refer to:

- Uk (Cyrillic), (Оу), a letter of the early Cyrillic alphabet
- Ouk-Khmer (Hill's version), a chess variant also known as Cambodian Chess of uncertain origin
- Abia Warriors F.C., a Nigerian football (soccer) club which played under the name Orji Uzor Kalu F.C. between 2005 and 2010
- Open University of Kaohsiung, a university in Kaohsiung, Taiwan
- South African English slang, roughly "guy" or equivalent to Australian bogan
