= Hongmaogang Cultural Park =

Park in Xiaogang, Kaohsiung, Taiwan

- 紅毛港文化園區
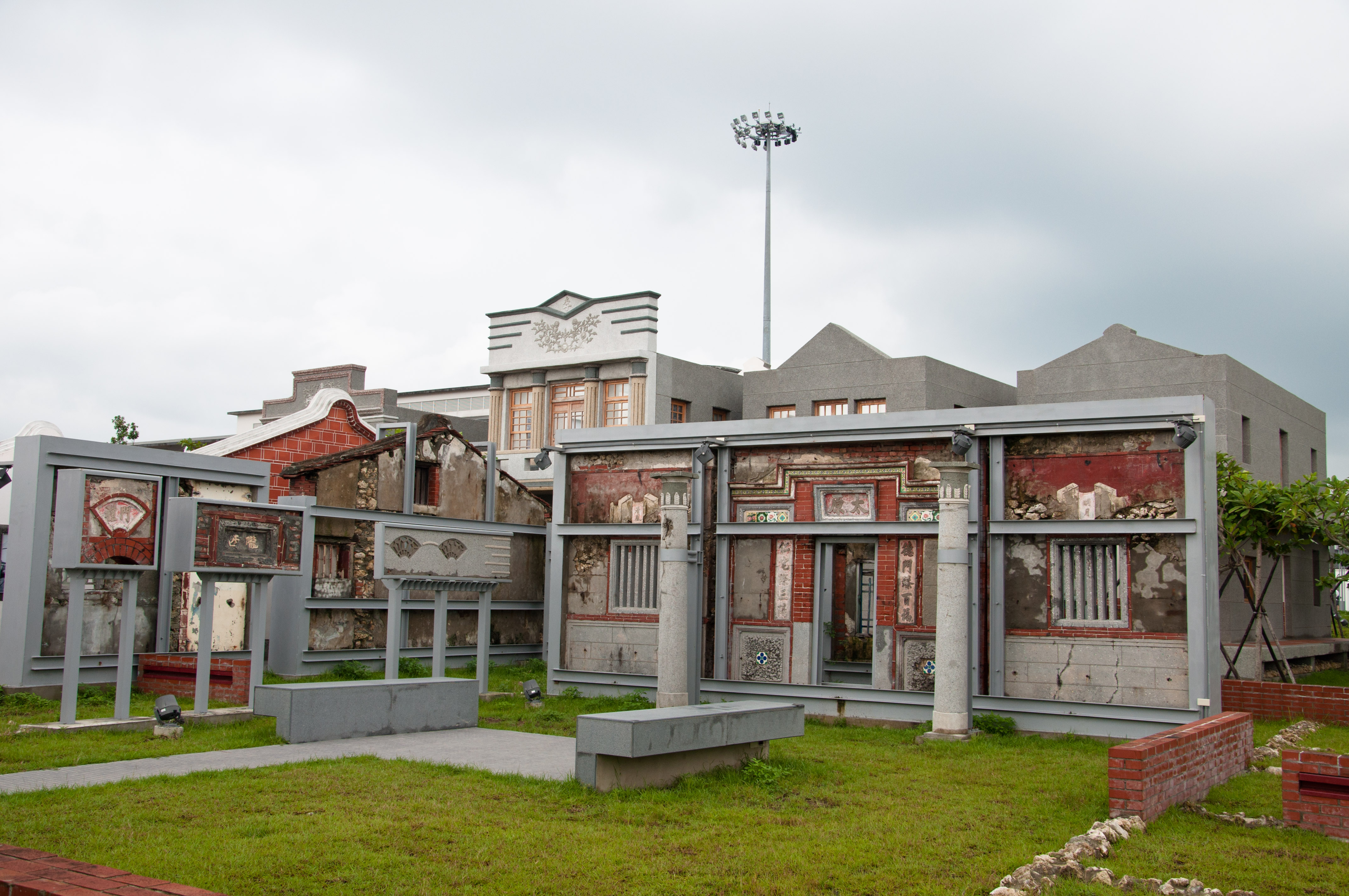
- Interactive map of the Hongmaogang Cultural Park area

General information
- Location: Siaogang, Kaohsiung, Taiwan
- Coordinates: 22°32′59.5″N 120°19′3.7″E
- Opened: June 2012
- Relocated: 2007

Technical details
- Size: 3.42 ha (8.5 acres)

Website
- Official website

The Hongmaogang Cultural Park (traditional Chinese: 紅毛港文化園區; simplified Chinese: 红毛港文化园区; pinyin: Hóngmáogǎng Wénhuà Yuánqū) is a cultural park in Siaogang District, Kaohsiung, Taiwan.

== Name ==
Hongmao is a reference to the "red-haired" rulers of Dutch Formosa.

== History ==
In 2007, the Hong Mao Gang Village was relocated from the original site in Siaogang District to make a way for Port of Kaohsiung Intercontinental Container Terminal. Using a small lot of land reserved, the cultural park was established there. It was opened in June 2012 after three years of renovation works.

== Architecture ==
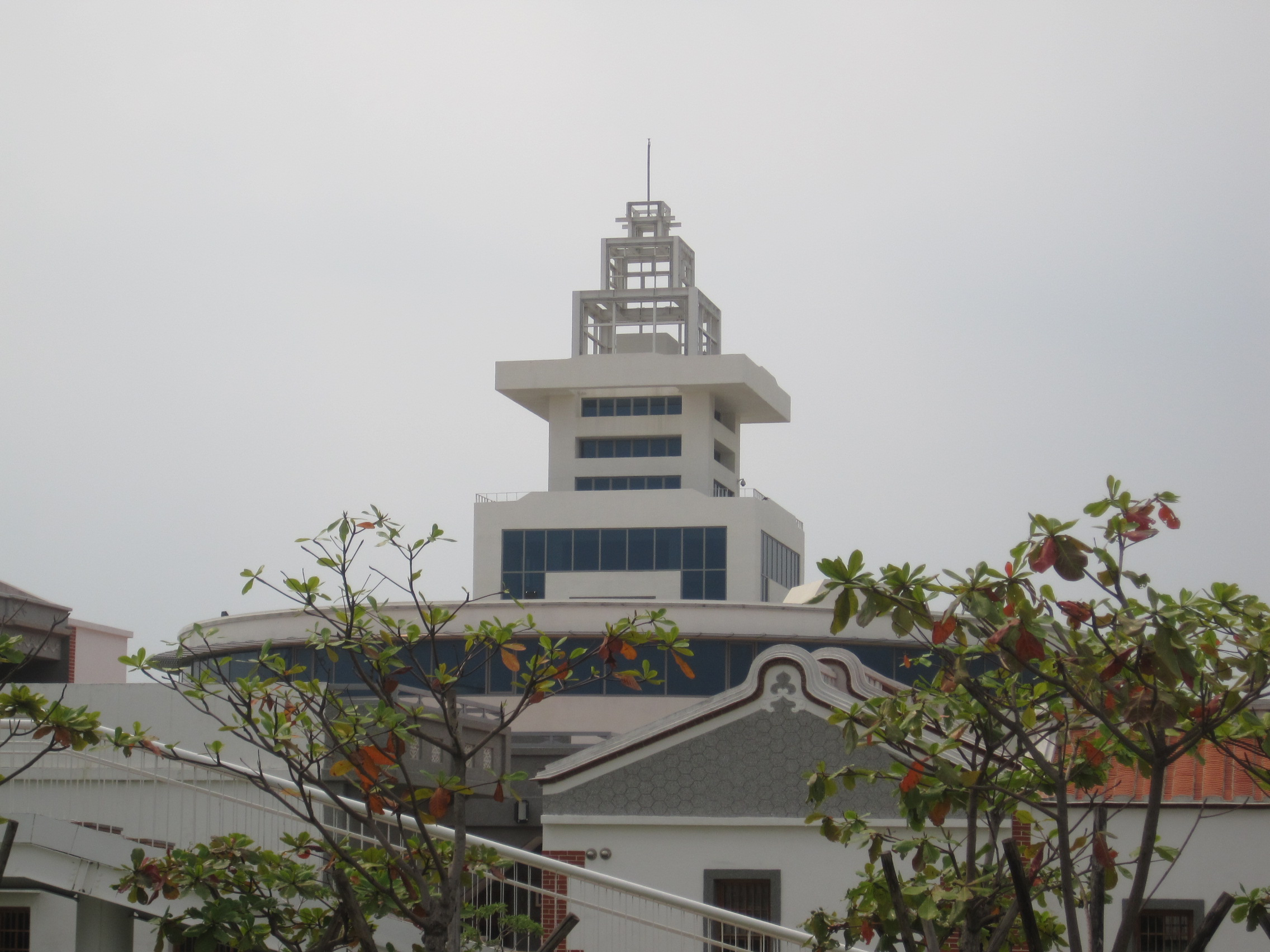
Gaozi Tower Revolving Restaurant

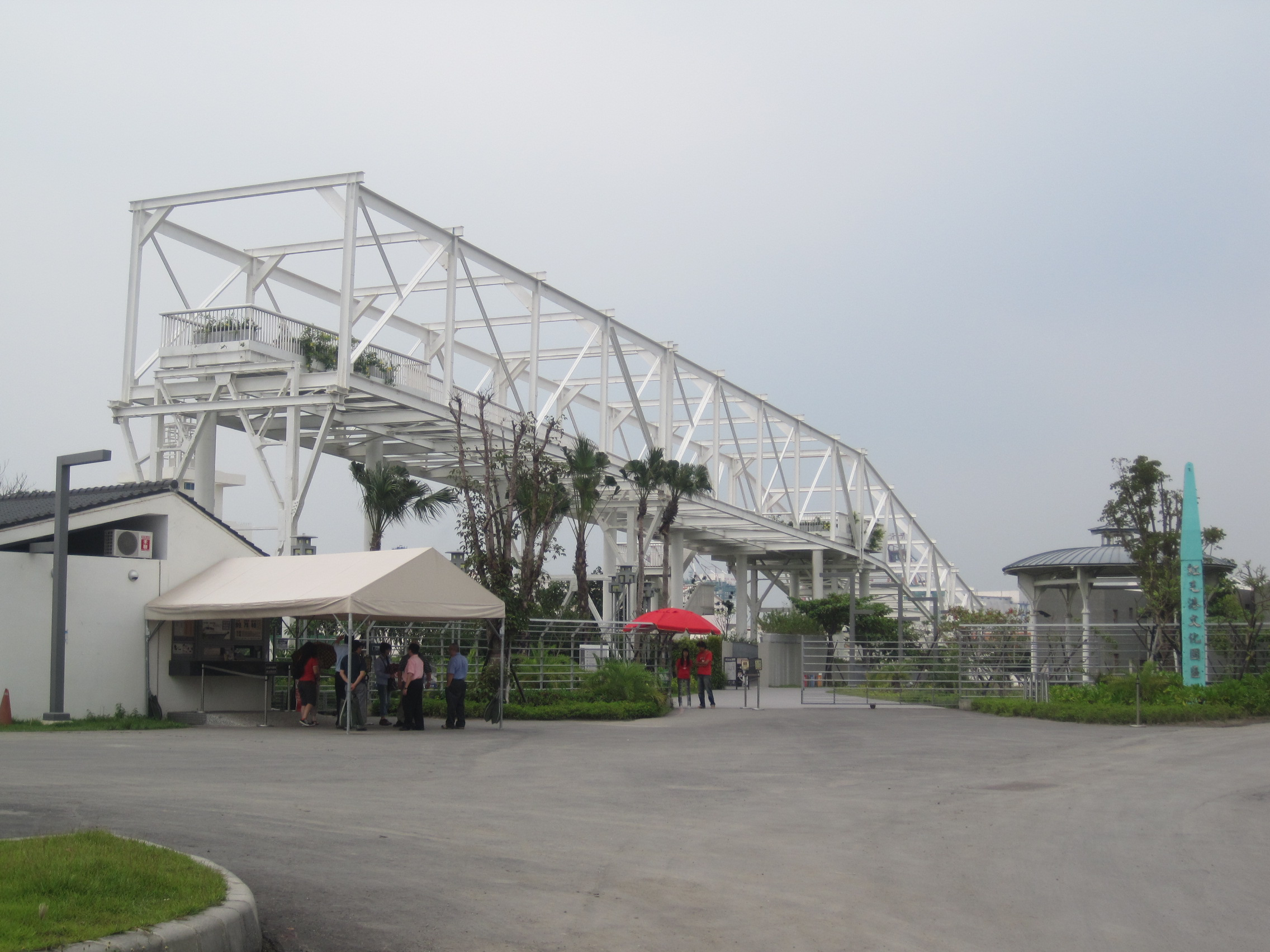
Sky Walk

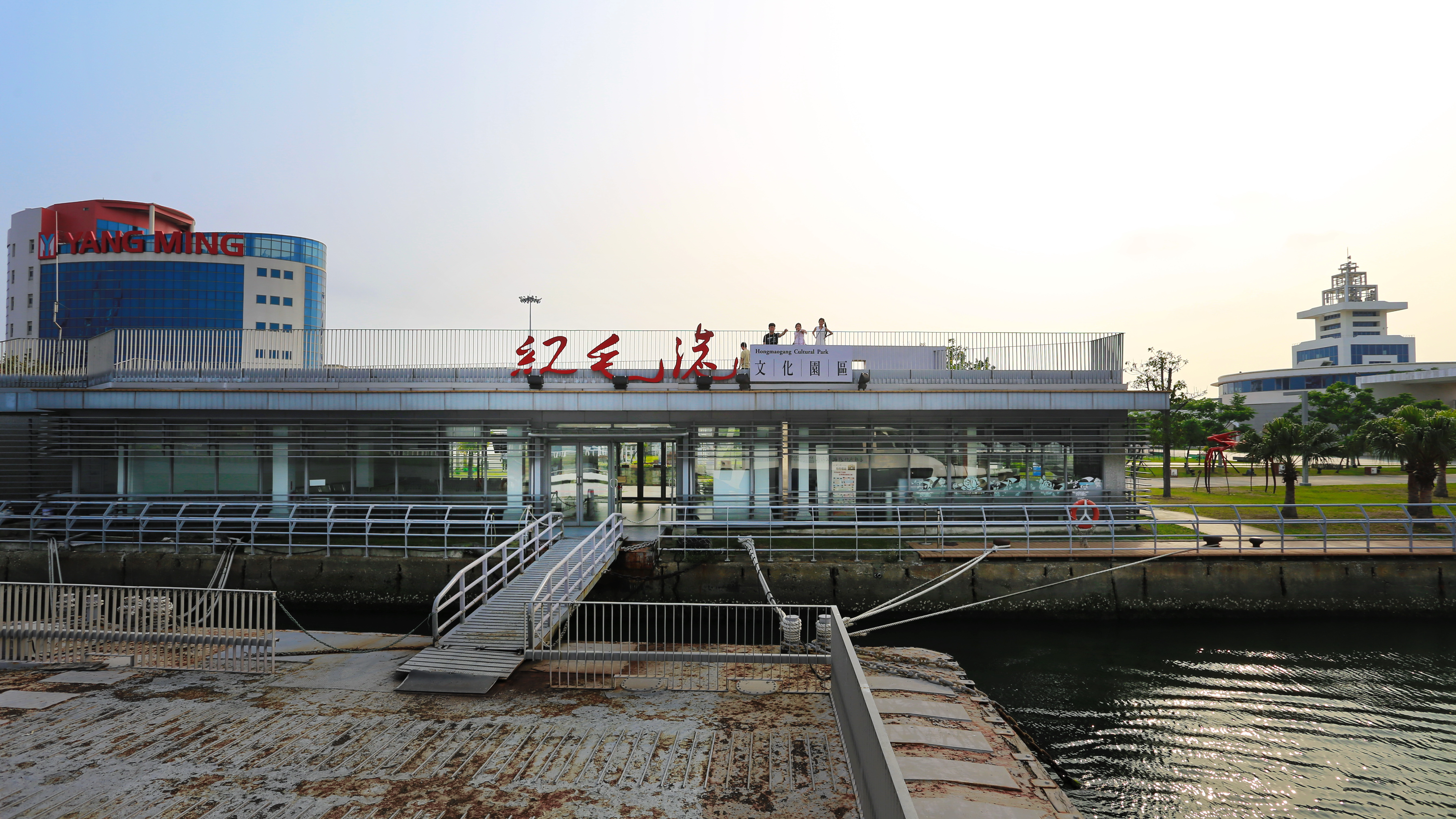
Pier in Hongmaogang Cultural Park

The park spans over an area of 3.42 hectares. It consists of Gaozi Tower Revolving Restaurant, exhibition hall, outdoor exhibition area, sky walk, pier and waiting Room and ocean front platform.

== Transportation ==
The cultural park is accessible by bus from Siaogang Station of Kaohsiung MRT.

== See also ==
- List of tourist attractions in Taiwan
