= New Ten Major Construction Projects =

Infrastructure projects in Taiwan

The New Ten Major Construction Projects (Chinese: 新十大建設; pinyin: Xīn Shí Dàjiànshè) were proposed major infrastructure projects in Taiwan introduced by then-Premier You Si-kun in November 2003.

== List of the projects ==
- Top universities and research centers
  - Goal: to have at least 15 major graduate schools ranked number 1 in Asia in 5 years; to get at least one college ranked one of the top 100 colleges of the world in 10 years.
- International arts and popular music centers
  - Northern Taiwan: Greater Taipei New Theater (constructed as the Taipei Performing Arts Center)
  - Central Taiwan: Taichung Metropolitan Opera House (constructed as the National Taichung Theater)
  - Southern Taiwan: Kaohsiung National Arts Cultural Center (constructed as the National Kaohsiung Center for the Arts)
- M-Taiwan plan
  - Goal: to build a world-class internet service environment, and become the third trillion-dollar communication industrial development.
- Taiwan exhibition
  - Goal: to exhibit Taiwan's creativity and vigor, and prompt the development of technology, tourism, and culture.
- TRA MRTizion: Appealing for pass car of THSR, via additions of stations, train services, elevation, underground passages, make TRA transform to metro area and regional MRTs, let TRA transform and renewal, and lead to urban renewal along the line.
- Freeway constructions
  - Goal: to develop tourist attraction areas such as Yilan, Hualien, Taitung, and Nantou; to facilitate the everyday life circle; to expand the highway network.
- Kaohsiung Harbor intercontinental container port center
  - Goal: to construct a new intercontinental container port for 15,000 TEU container ships; improve the transport ability of the Kaohsiung port.
- Northern, central, and southern metro system
  - Goal: to plan and construct a total of 182 km of metro routes; to improve the rapid transit systems in metropolitan areas of northern, central, and southern Taiwan.
- Sewers
  - Goal: to improve the living environment; to purify the water; to regain beautiful rivers and ocean.
- Turn seawater to drinking water; shut down other dams on the mountains. Solve the famine problems, make more tap water, create tourism and environmental friendly lakes.

== See also ==
- Ten Major Construction Projects
- Forward-looking Infrastructure Development Program
- History of Taiwan
