= Kaohsiung International Airport metro station =

Metro station in Xiaogang, Kaohsiung, Taiwan

Kaohsiung International Airport R4 高雄國際機場
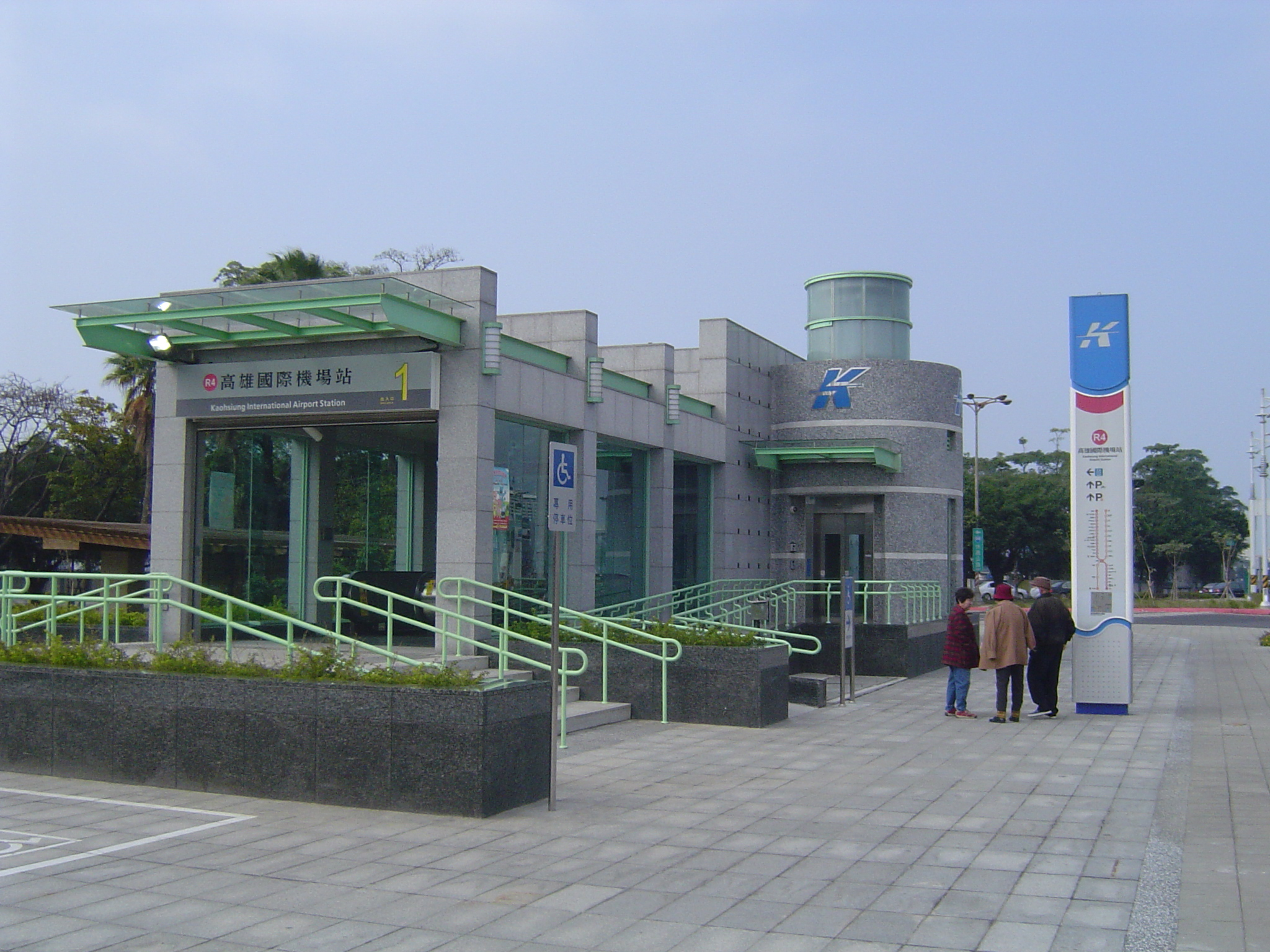
- Kaohsiung International Airport station exit 1

Chinese name
- Traditional Chinese: 高雄國際機場車站
- Simplified Chinese: 高雄国际机场车站
Transcriptions
Standard Mandarin
- Hanyu Pinyin: Gāoxióng Guójì Jīchǎng Chēzhàn
- Wade–Giles: Kaoh^{1}-siung^{2} Kuo^{2}-chi^{4} Chi^{1}-ch'ang^{3} Ch'ê^{1}-chan^{4}
- Tongyong Pinyin: Gaosyóng Guójì Jichǎng Chejhàn

General information
- Location: Siaogang, Kaohsiung; Taiwan
- Coordinates: 22°34′15″N 120°20′30″E
- Operated by: Kaohsiung Rapid Transit Corporation
- Line: Red line (R4)
- Platforms: One island platform

Construction
- Structure type: Underground

History
- Opened: 2008-03-09

Passengers
- 3,070 daily (Jan. 2011)

Services
Preceding station	Kaohsiung Metro	Following station
Caoya towards Gangshan	Red line	Siaogang Terminus
Location

Kaohsiung International Airport is a station in Siaogang District, Kaohsiung, Taiwan, on the Red line of Kaohsiung MRT serving Kaohsiung International Airport.

== Station overview ==
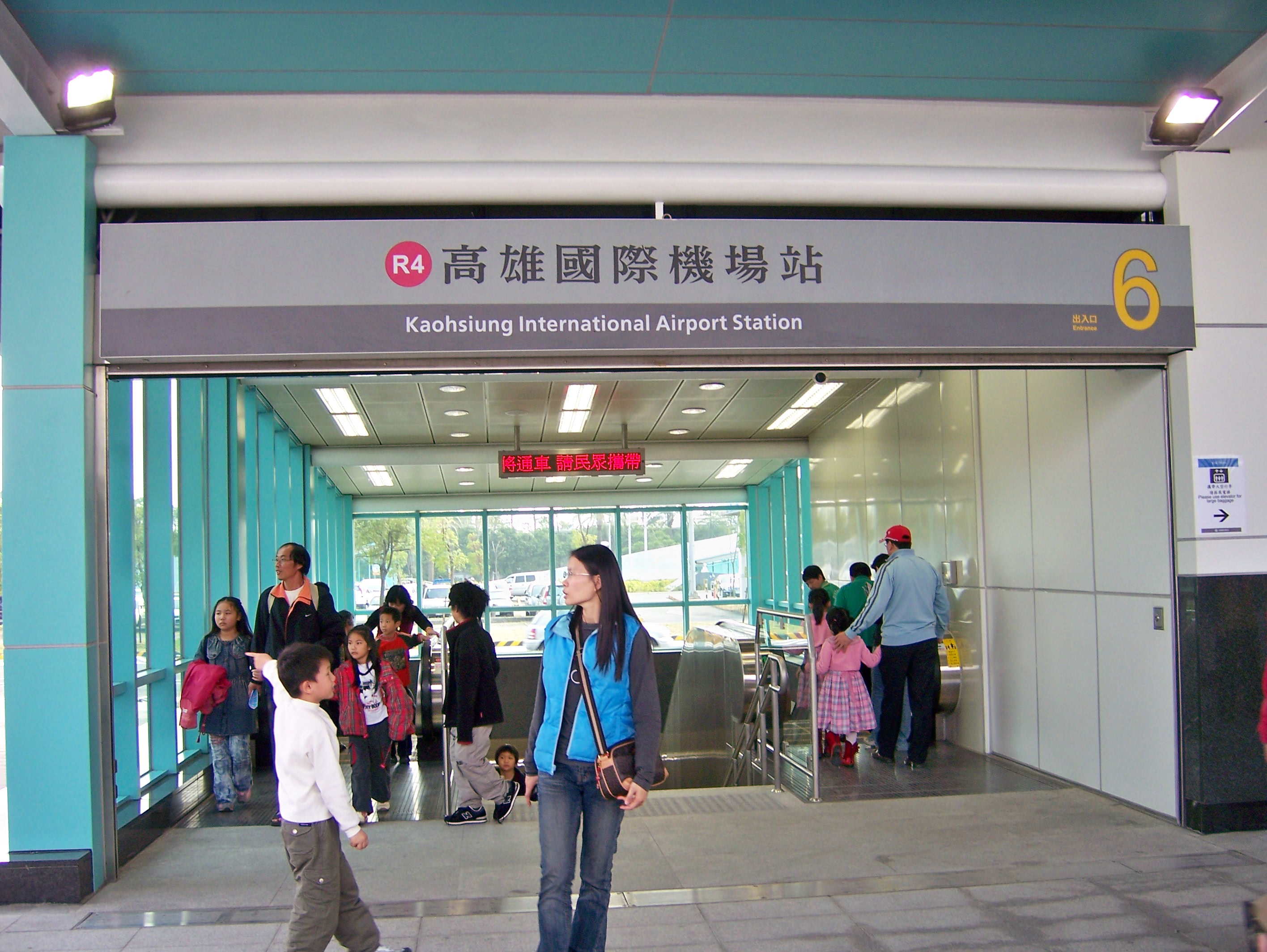
Kaohsiung International Airport station exit 6

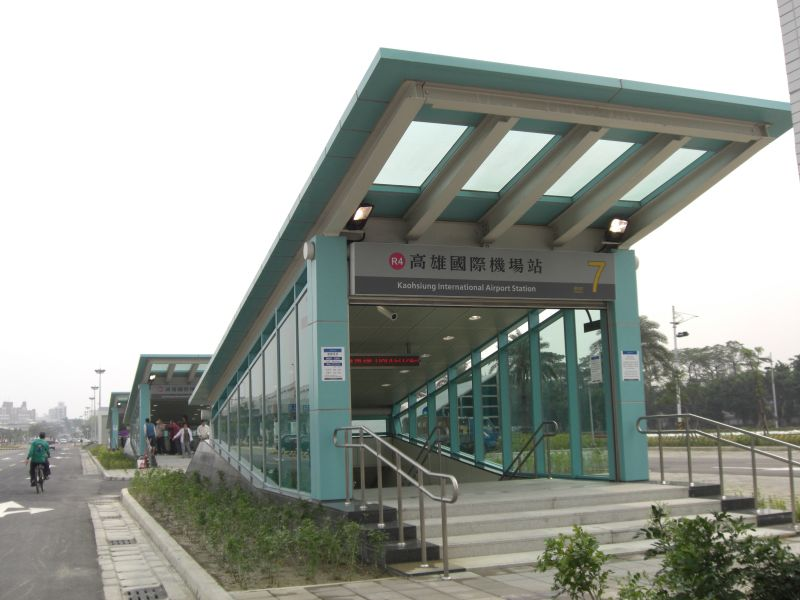
Kaohsiung International Airport station exit 7

This is a two-level, underground station with an island platform and seven exits. It is 195 metres long and is located at the intersection of Jhongshan 4th Rd and Dayeh North Rd.

This station marked the first time a subway network had been linked to an airport in Taiwan.

In Chinese, this station and Nangang Software Park station on the Taipei Metro share the longest subway station names in Taiwan.

== Around the station ==
- Kaohsiung International Airport
- Kaohsiung Astronomical Museum
- Kaohsiung Park
