= Kaohsiung Park =

Park in Xiaogang, Kaohsiung, Taiwan

- 高雄公園
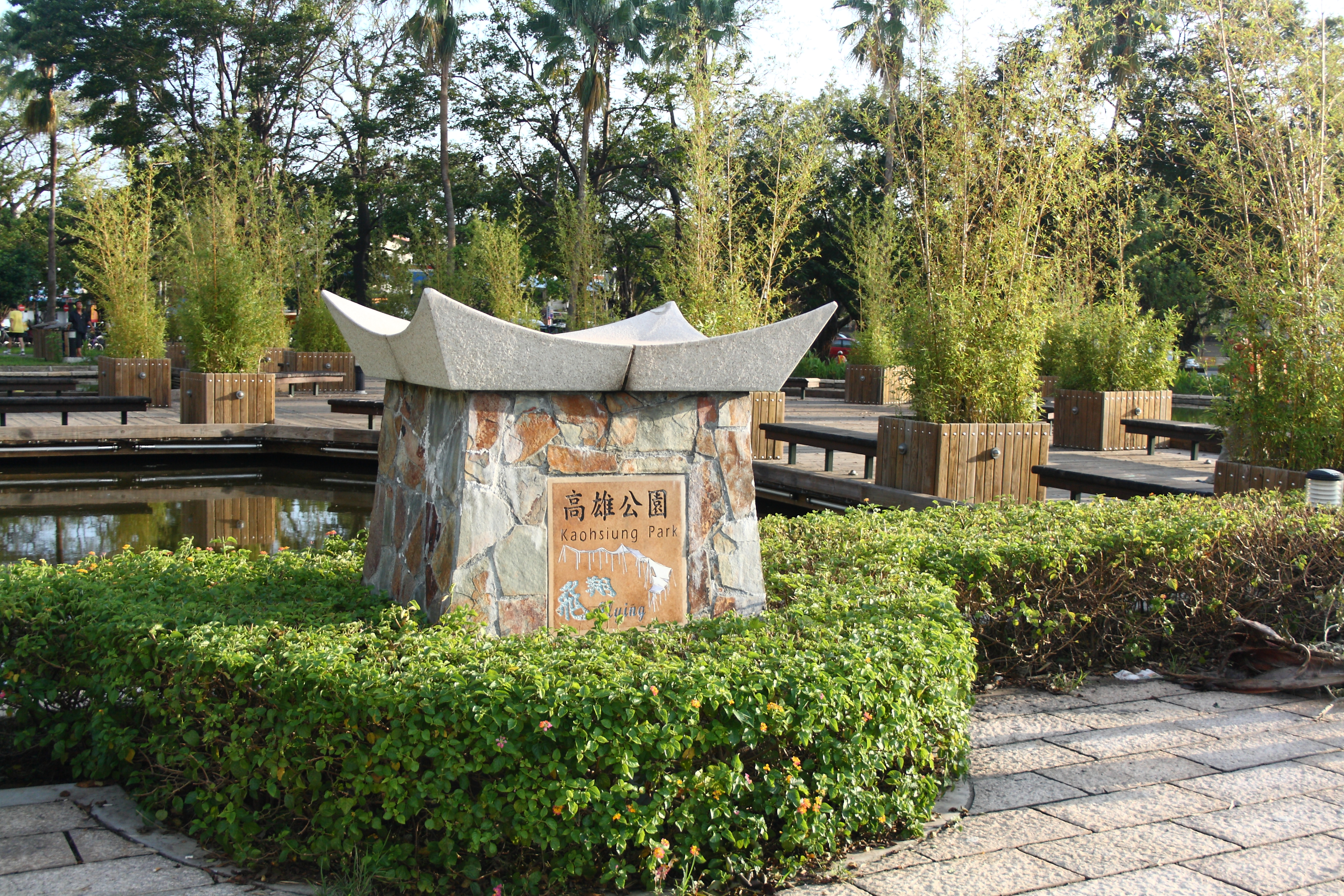
- Interactive map of Kaohsiung Park
- Type: urban park
- Location: Siaogang, Kaohsiung, Taiwan
- Coordinates: 22°34′08″N 120°20′46″E
- Public transit: Kaohsiung International Airport Station

The Kaohsiung Park (traditional Chinese: 高雄公園; simplified Chinese: 高雄公园; pinyin: Gāoxióng Gōngyuán) is a park in Siaogang District, Kaohsiung, Taiwan.

== Transportation ==
The park is accessible within walking distance south east of Kaohsiung International Airport Station of Kaohsiung MRT.

== See also ==
- List of parks in Taiwan
