= National Kaohsiung University of Hospitality and Tourism =

University in Kaohsiung, Taiwan

Coordinates: 22°33′56″N 120°22′17″E

- 國立高雄餐旅大學
- Motto: 精、誠、勤、樸(Pe̍h-ōe-jī: Cheng, sêng, khîn, phok)
- Motto in English: Perfect, Honest, Diligent, Modest
- Type: Public
- Established: 1 July 1995 (as National Kaohsiung Hospitality Management Academy); 1 August 2000 (as NKHC); 1 August 2010 (as NKUHT)
- Location: Siaogang, Kaohsiung, Taiwan
- Website: www.nkuht.edu.tw

National Kaohsiung University of Hospitality and Tourism
- Traditional Chinese: 國立高雄餐旅大學
Transcriptions
Standard Mandarin
- Hanyu Pinyin: Guólì Gāoxióng Cānlǚ Dàxué
Southern Min
- Hokkien POJ: Kok-li̍p Ko-hiông Chhan-lú Tāi-ha̍k

The National Kaohsiung University of Hospitality and Tourism (NKUHT; Chinese: 國立高雄餐旅大學; Pe̍h-ōe-jī: Kok-li̍p Ko-hiông Chhan-lú Tāi-ha̍k) is a public university located in Siaogang District, Kaohsiung, Taiwan. It is the only public university specializing in hospitality and tourism in Taiwan.

The total amount of Bachelor, Master and Doctoral enrollments were 5,331 in 2016.

== Rankings ==
According to 2021 ARWU Subject Ranking, the NKUHT ranked 151-200 in the world and No.6 in Taiwan, which is next to National Dong Hwa University (101-150 Globally).

In the 2024 QS World University Rankings by Subject NKUHT was ranked 38th in the world for Hospitality and Leisure Management.

== History ==
The university was originally established as National Kaohsiung Hospitality Management Academy on 1 July 1995.

On 1 August 2000, it was upgraded to National Kaohsiung Hospitality College (NKHC).

On 1 August 2010, it was upgraded to National Kaohsiung University of Hospitality and Tourism.

The University has collaborated with the Taiwan Sugar Research Institute to produce rhum agricole from the sugarcane variety ROC24. In 2025 two of the research batches won gold medals at the Vinalies Internationales competition in France.

== Faculties ==
- School of Culinary Arts
  - Graduate Institute of Food Culture and Innovation
  - Department of Chinese Culinary Arts
  - Department of Western Culinary Arts
  - Department of Baking Technology and Management
  - Department of Culinary Arts
- School of Hospitality Management
  - Graduate Institute of Hospitality
  - Department of Hotel Management
  - Department of Food and Beverage Management
  - Department of Hospitality and M.I.C.E. Marketing Management
- School of Tourism
  - Graduate Institute of Tourism Management
  - Department of Travel Management
  - Department of Airline and Transport Service Management
  - Department of Leisure, Recreation and Tourism Management
- International School
  - Department of Applied English
  - Department of Applied Japanese
  - International Bachelor Program in Tourism Management
  - International Bachelor Program in Chinese Culinary Arts

== University Founding Principles ==
- Promote holistic education to cultivate outstanding talents for the hospitality and tourism industries.
- Integrate theory with practice to increase students’ competitiveness.
- Strengthen the cooperation between industry and academy to create a platform for hospitality research and development.
- Implement lifelong learning to improve the quality of hospitality and tourism employees.
- Develop international communication to promote a global outlook.

== Institutional Positioning ==
- Cultivate talented leaders for the hospitality industry
- Act as a key partner for business and industry
- Promote a new paradigm of hospitality education

== Transportation ==
NKUHT is within 3 kilometers of Siaogang Station of the Kaohsiung MRT.

== University structure ==
The university also runs the Affiliated Hospitality Senior High School of National Kaohsiung University of Hospitality and Tourism, NKHHS, a daughter institution for secondary-school students in Taiwan.

== See also ==
- List of universities in Taiwan
