= Fengbitou Archaeological Site =

Archaeological site in Linyuan, Kaohsiung, Taiwan

- 鳳鼻頭遺址 (Chinese)
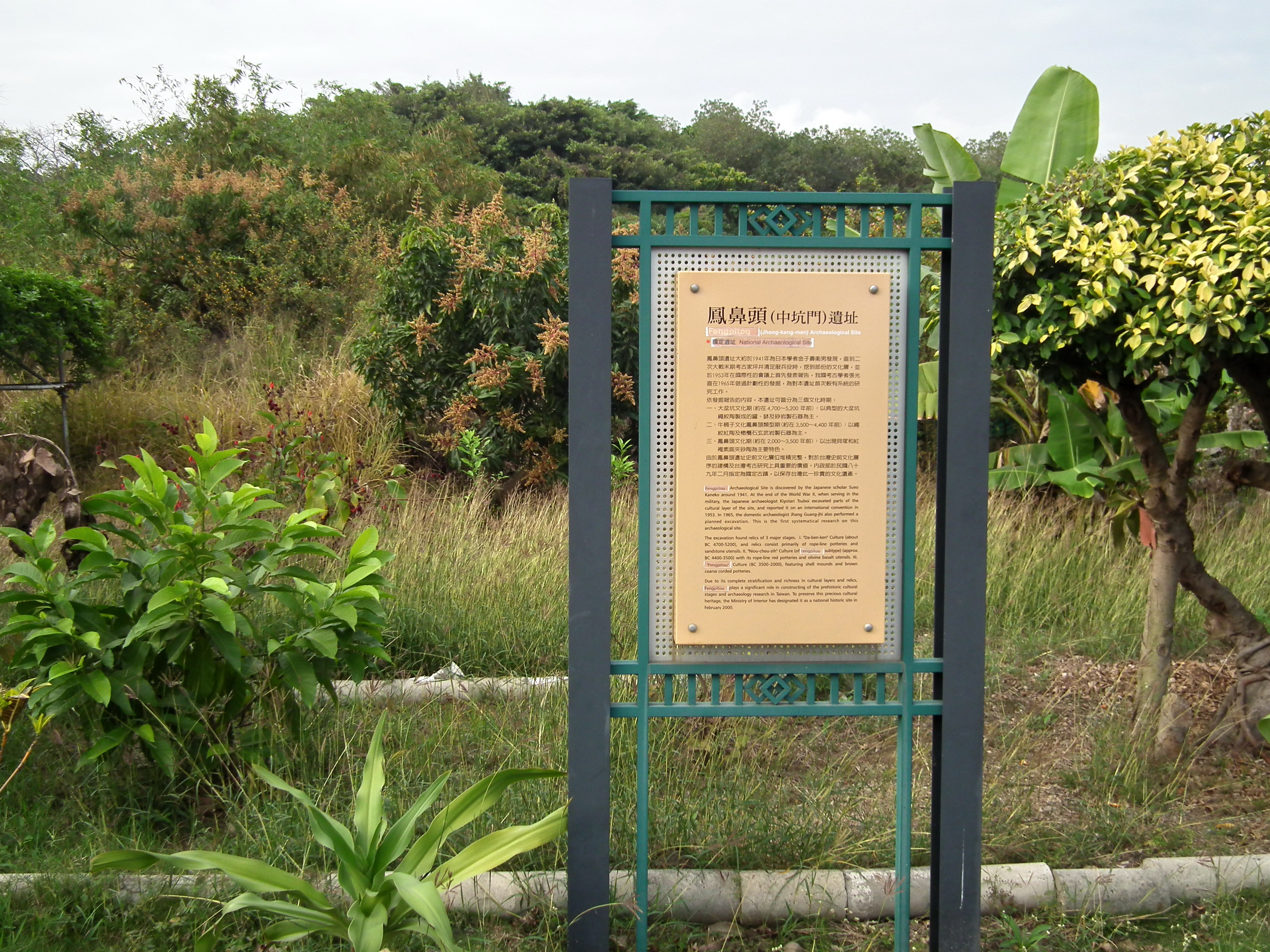

- Location within Kaohsiung
- 22°30′38.1″N 120°22′2.4″E
- Type: archaeological site
- Location: Linyuan, Kaohsiung, Taiwan
- Part of: Fengshan Hill

Site notes
- Area: 9.77 ha (24.1 acres)
- Excavation dates: 1945, 1965
- Discovered: 1941

The Fengbitou Archaeological Site (traditional Chinese: 鳳鼻頭遺址; simplified Chinese: 凤鼻头遗址; pinyin: Fèngbítóu Yízhǐ), officially known as Fengpitou (Chungkengmen) Archaeological Site (in Taiwan's archaeological tradition, it is usually spelled n Wade–Giles system), is an archaeological site in Chungmen Village, Linyuan District, Kaohsiung, Taiwan, on the plateau north to the Chungkengmen Settlement. It’s at the southern direction of Fengshan Hill, with an area of 9.7 hectares. The archaeological culture can be dated back to 2,000 to 5,200 years ago, and the cultural layers includes Tapenkeng Culture, Fengpitou Type of Niuchoutzi Culture, and Fengpitou Culture, demonstrating the prehistoric development of southwestern Taiwan.

== History ==
The site was discovered by Japanese scholar Sueo Kaneko around 1941. In 1943, Naoichi Kokubu was also investigating the site. In 1945, Japanese archaeologist Kiyotari Tsuboi excavated the site and presented his findings at an international conference in 1953, and named it “Fengpitou”, and it was often called the site of the original name "Zhongkengmen" by this name. Later on, Chang Kuang-Chih, Huang Shih-Chiang, and Liu I-Chang also conducted investigations, trail excavations, and excavations. The site currently functions as orchard, plantation, and burial ground.

== Geology ==
The 9.77-hectare site is located at the slope of Fengshan Hill with a shape of a fan. The hill has a height of 15–20 meters and the site is located at the elevation of 28–55 meters above sea level. The site is located near the area of Fengbitou.

== Discovery ==
The unearthed artifacts include the cord-marked potteries, net sinkers, and spearheads of the Tapenkeng Culture 4,300 to 5,000 years ago (3050 to 2350 B.C.E.); red cord-marked potteries, pottery vases, pottery bowls, ceramic spindle whorl, axe-hoe tools, spear tools, stone knives, and adzes, which are mostly made of picrite basalt and thus suspected to be related to Penghu, of the Niuchoutzi Culture 3,500 to 4,300 years ago (2350 to 1550 B.C.E.); and painted potteries, black potteries, polished black pottery jars, pottery cups, pottery bowls, ceramic spindle whorl, axe-hoe tools, adzes, stone knives, spearheads, net sinkers, earrings, stone rings, and middens of the Fengpitou Culture 2,000 to 3,500 years ago (1550 to 50 B.C.E.). In addition to the prehistoric cultural layer, remains of Qing Dynasty and Japanese Colonial Era can also be found.

== Designated as a national archaeological site ==
As the site contains rich cultural layers, represent the prehistoric development sequence in southwestern Taiwan, and serves as the representation of Fengpitou Culture, it is designated as national historic site on February 11, 2000, and was changed as a national archaeological site on May 1, 2006.

== See also ==
- Prehistory of Taiwan
