= Dalin Refinery =

Oil refinery in Xiaogang, Kaohsiung, Taiwan

Dalin Refinery 大林煉油廠
- Location within Kaohsiung
- Location: Xiaogang, Kaohsiung, Taiwan; 22°31′45.8″N 120°20′50.5″E

Refinery details
- Operator: CPC Corporation
- Owner: CPC Corporation
- Opened: 1996

The Dalin Refinery (traditional Chinese: 大林煉油廠; simplified Chinese: 大林炼油厂; pinyin: Dàlín Liànyóu Chǎng) is an oil refinery in Xiaogang District, Kaohsiung, Taiwan.

== History ==
The refinery became operationally independent from Kaohsiung Refinery in 1996. In 2009, a gasoline pyrolysis and hydro-desulfurization unit was constructed at the refinery with a capacity of 20,000 barrels per day. In 2010, a diesel hydro-desulfurization unit was constructed with a capacity of 40,000 barrels per day. In 2011, an 18,000 barrels per day gasoline pyrolysis and quality improvement unit was moved from Kaohsiung Refinery to the Dalin plant. In 2013, the residual fluid catalytic cracking unit which was constructed in 2006 began its testing and production. Also in the same year, an alkylation unit with a capacity of 14,000 barrels per day was established at the plant.

== Architecture ==
The refinery spans over an area of 500 hectares.

== Accidents and incidents ==
- 10 March 2018, an explosion hit the plant causing part of its production being suspended.

== See also ==
- List of oil refineries
- Mining in Taiwan
