= Kaohsiung Municipal Social Education Hall =

Education center in Xiaogang, Kaohsiung, Taiwan

- 高雄市立社會教育館
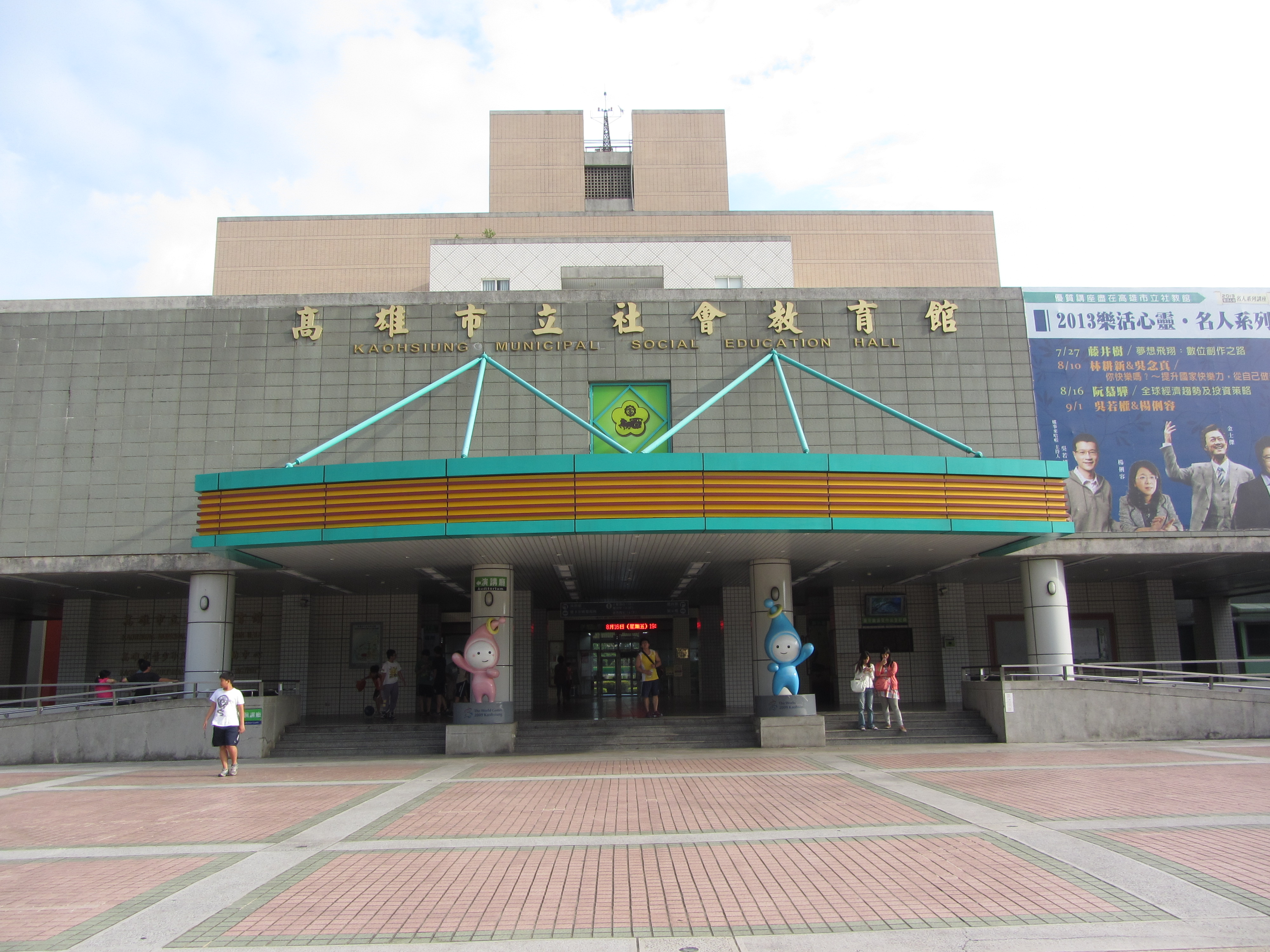
- Interactive map of the Kaohsiung Municipal Social Education Hall area

General information
- Location: Siaogang, Kaohsiung, Taiwan
- Coordinates: 22°33′53.7″N 120°21′33.8″E
- Opened: 1995

Website
- Official website

The Kaohsiung Municipal Social Education Hall (traditional Chinese: 高雄市立社會教育館; simplified Chinese: 高雄市立社会教育馆; pinyin: Gāoxióng Shìlì Shèhuì Jiàoyù Guǎn) is an educational center in Siaogang District, Kaohsiung, Taiwan.

== History ==
In 1950, the Kaohsiung Social Education Work Team was established at the 228 Memorial Park area. In 1965, the team was restructured and became the Kaohsiung Municipal Social Education Center. In 1971, the center moved its office to Cianjin District. In 1995, the Cultural and Physical Activity Center for Youth was established in Siaogang District, and the center moved to the same venue and became the Kaohsiung Municipal Social Education Hall which was opened in the same year.

== Architecture ==
The hall consists of various sections, ranging from performance auditorium, gallery, gymnasium, culture and art building, atrium etc. Its outdoor area holds various sport fields, such as paintball field, skating rink, camping area, barbecue area, etc.

== Transportation ==
The museum is accessible within walking distance east from Siaogang Station of Kaohsiung MRT.

== See also ==
- List of tourist attractions in Taiwan
- List of science centers#Asia
