= Kaohsiung Astronomical Museum =

Museum in Xiaogang, Kaohsiung, Taiwan

- 高雄市立天文教育館
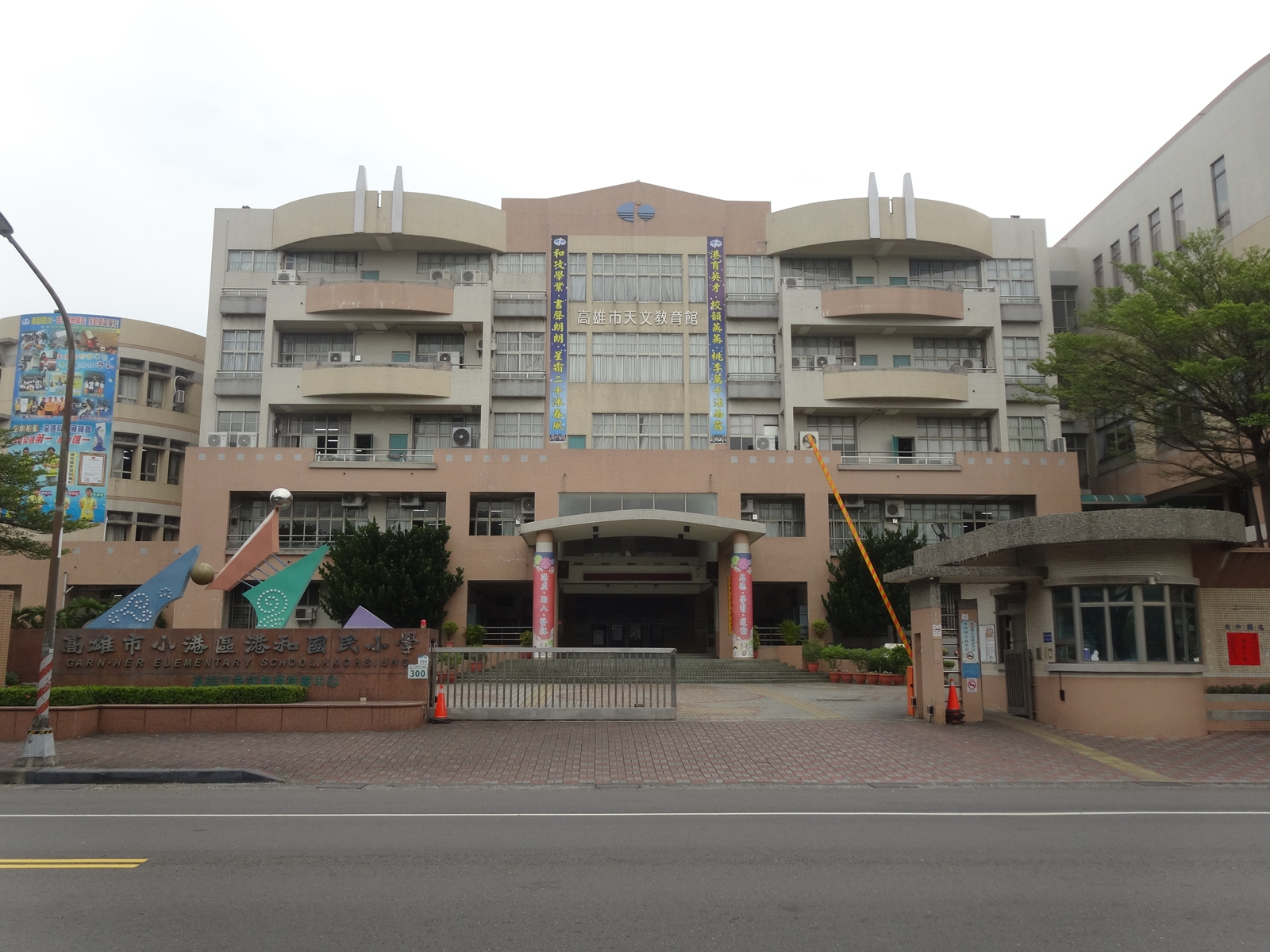
- Established: 2000
- Location: Siaogang, Kaohsiung, Taiwan
- Coordinates: 22°34′05.3″N 120°20′14.8″E
- Type: museum
- Public transit access: Kaohsiung International Airport Station

The Kaohsiung Astronomical Museum (traditional Chinese: 高雄市立天文教育館; simplified Chinese: 高雄市立天文教育馆; pinyin: Gāoxióng Shìlì Tiānwén Jiàoyùguǎn) is an astronomical museum in Siaogang District, Kaohsiung, Taiwan.

== History ==
The museum was established in 2000.

== Features ==
The museum has a 2-meter-diameter constellation map, which is the largest ever created in Chinese, and contains the NT$6 million Temma Mewlon 300mm reflector telescope, the most developed telescope ever owned by a museum or organization other than the research institutes in Taiwan.

== Transportation ==
The museum is accessible within walking distance South West from Kaohsiung International Airport Station of the Kaohsiung MRT.

== See also ==
- List of museums in Taiwan
