= Ten Major Construction Projects =

Key infrastructure upgrades to Taiwan's economic history

- Location: Taiwan
- Type: Economic development
- Cause: 1973 oil crisis and lacked key utilities
- Organized by: Premier Chiang Ching-kuo

The Ten Major Construction Projects (Chinese: 十大建設; pinyin: Shí Dà jiànshè) were the national infrastructure projects during the 1970s in Taiwan (officially: Republic of China). The government of the ROC believed that the country lacked key utilities such as highways, seaports, airports and power plants. Moreover, Taiwan was experiencing significant effects from the 1973 oil crisis. Therefore, to upgrade the industry and the development of the country, the government planned to take on ten massive building projects. They were proposed by the Premier Chiang Ching-kuo, beginning in 1974, with a planned completion by 1979. There were six transportation projects, three industrial projects, and one power-plant construction project, which ultimately cost over NT$300 billion in total.

== Projects ==
1. North-South Freeway (National Highway No. 1)
2. Electrification of West Coast Line railway (led by Luo Yuchang)
3. North-Link Line railway
4. Chiang Kai-shek International Airport (later renamed Taoyuan International Airport)
5. Port of Taichung
6. Su-ao Port
7. Large Shipyard (Kaohsiung Shipyard of China Shipbuilding Corporation)
8. Integrated steel mill (China Steel Corporation)
9. Oil refinery and industrial park (Kaohsiung Refinery)
10. Nuclear power plant (Jinshan Nuclear Power Plant)

== Effects ==
The Ten Major Construction Projects in Taiwan provided immediate relief during the economic downturn triggered by the oil crisis. Over the long term, they laid the groundwork for modern transportation infrastructure, ensuring a robust electricity supply and bolstering Taiwan's investment climate. Industries like steel, shipbuilding, and petrochemicals achieved greater self-sufficiency in raw materials, diminishing reliance on imports and catalyzing industrial transformation. This momentum also stimulated the growth of downstream industries, fostering strategic advancement in Taiwan's economy and facilitating comprehensive industrial modernization. For instance, the travel time from Keelung to Taipei on National Highway No. 1 decreased from 39 minutes to 18 minutes, not only saving time and money but also doubling the island's road transport capacity and fueling economic growth in industrial hubs near interchanges. The North-link Line, Taiwan's inaugural railway constructed by the Nationalist Government, bridged the eastern and western segments of Taiwan's transportation grid, converting a once-projected loss-making route into a profitable conduit for both passengers and freight upon completion.

Executing the Ten Major Construction Projects in Taiwan during a period of low national income entailed significant risks and deliberations. Despite contending with external challenges like the initial oil crisis and withdrawal from the United Nations, the government opted to forge ahead with substantial investments. Although the capacity of industrial construction and the market-driving potential of substantial funds were uncertain, the projects encountered notable criticism and scrutiny, including allegations during the construction of National Highway No. 1, that it primarily benefited the affluent (given the limited prevalence of car ownership at the time).

The Ten Major Construction Projects exerted a profound influence on Taiwan's economic landscape at the time. According to data from the Directorate-General of Budget, Accounting, and Statistics (now the Directorate-General of Budget, Accounting, and Statistics), following the commencement of construction on National Freeway No. 1 in 1971, Taiwan's economic growth rate stood at 1.16% in 1974, with industrial growth at -4.5% and inflation at 47.5%; by 1976, the economic growth rate soared to 13.86%, with industrial growth at 24.4% and inflation at 2.48%.

== See also ==
- New Ten Major Construction Projects
- History of Republic of China
