= Kaohsiung Refinery =

Former oil refinery in Nanzi, Kaohsiung, Taiwan

Kaohsiung Refinery 高雄煉油廠
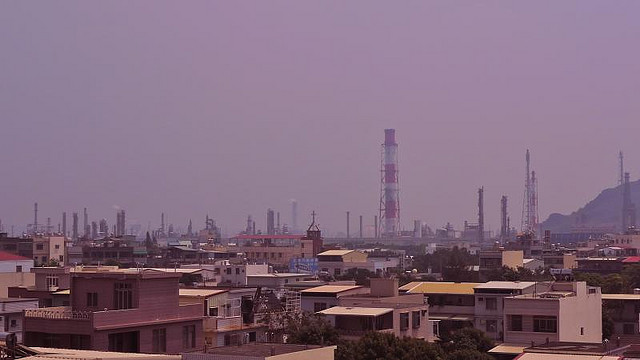

- Location within Kaohsiung
- Location: Nanzi, Kaohsiung, Taiwan; 22°42′15.8″N 120°18′10.1″E

Refinery details
- Operator: CPC Corporation
- Owner: CPC Corporation
- Closed: 2015
- Capacity: 220,000 barrels per day (35,000 m^{3}/d)

The Kaohsiug Refinery (traditional Chinese: 高雄煉油廠; simplified Chinese: 高雄炼油厂; pinyin: Gāoxióng Liànyóu Chǎng) was an oil refinery in Nanzi District, Kaohsiung, Taiwan.

== History ==
The construction for the refinery was firstly proposed in 1987. The refinery was closed in 2015 and its refinery activities were transferred to Dalin Refinery.

== Architecture ==
The refinery spanned over an area of 273 hectares. It had a capacity to process 220,000 barrel of crude oil per day.

== See also ==
- List of oil refineries
- Mining in Taiwan
