= Open University of Kaohsiung =

University in Kaohsiung, Taiwan

- 高雄市立空中大學
- Motto: 精勤恆實
- Motto in English: Expertise, diligence, perseverance, pragmatism
- Type: Municipal
- Established: 1997
- Affiliations: Kaohsiung City Government
- President: Liu Chia-ju (劉嘉茹)
- Provost: Kao Yi-chan (高義展)
- Students: 16,000
- Location: Siaogang, Kaohsiung, Taiwan; 22.5662°N 120.3457°E
- Campus: Suburban
- Website: www.ouk.edu.tw

Open University of Kaohsiung
- Traditional Chinese: 高雄市立空中大學
Transcriptions
Standard Mandarin
- Hanyu Pinyin: Gāoxióng Shìlì Kōngzhōng Dàxué

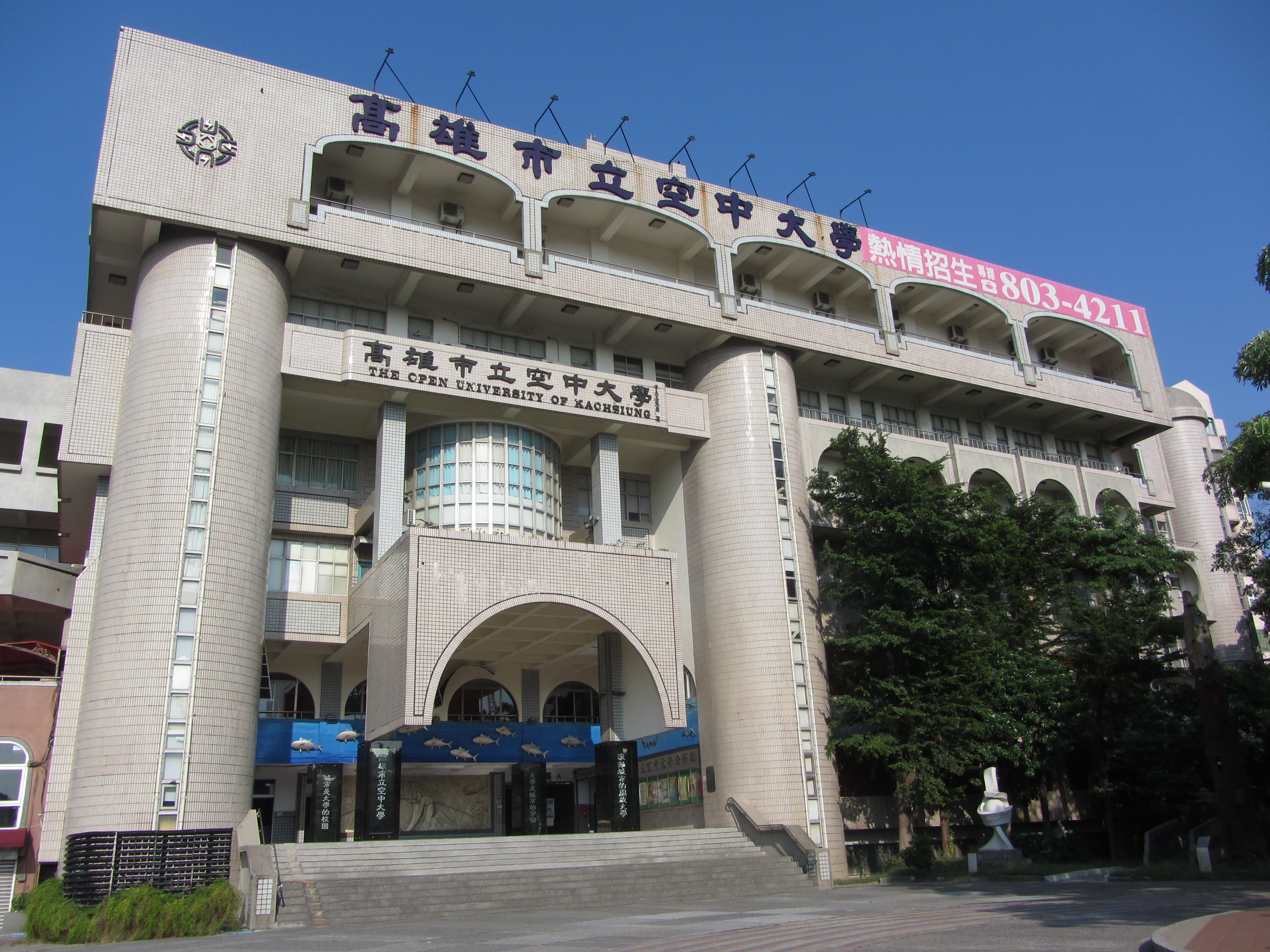
Open University of Kaohsiung

The Open University of Kaohsiung (OUK; Chinese: 高雄市立空中大學) is an open university in Siaogang District, Kaohsiung, Taiwan. OUK is an agency of the Kaohsiung City Government.

As a comprehensive university, OUK offers academic programs at the undergraduate and graduate levels, including business, tourism, engineering, technology, marine science, and design.

OUK also offers distance education and continuing education programs.

== History ==
The OUK was originally established in 1997 as the Opening University of Kaohsiung. In 2008, it was renamed to Open University of Kaohsiung.

== Faculties ==
- Department of Law
- Department of Industrial and Business Administration
- Department of Mass Communication
- Department of Foreign Languages and Literature
- Department of Culture and Art
- Department of Technology Management
- General Education Center

== See also ==
- List of universities in Taiwan
