= Siaogang District =

District in Kaohsiung, Taiwan

Siaogang 小港區 Kominato
- District
- Siaogang District
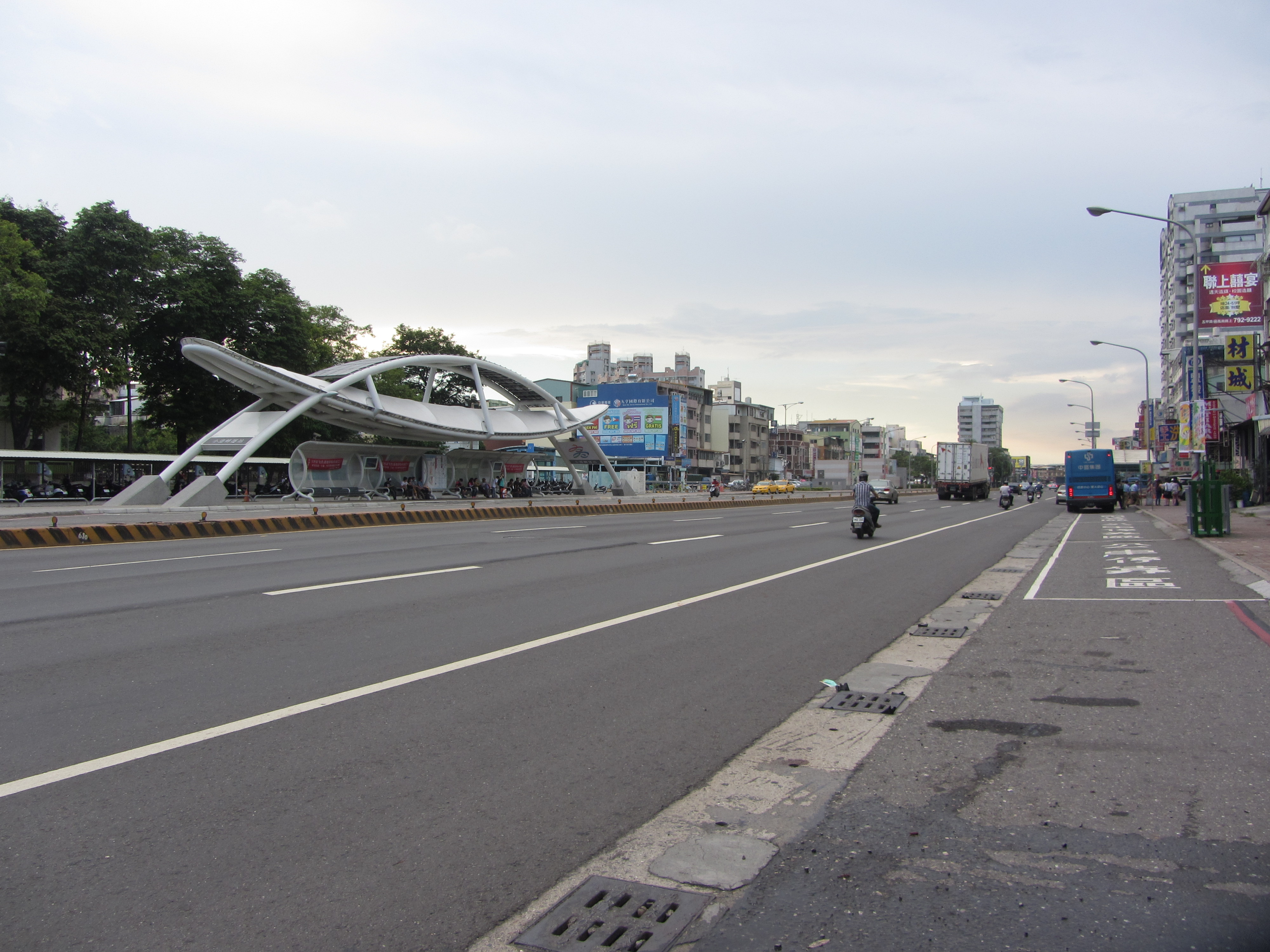

- 高雄市小港區公所; Siaogang District Office Kaohsiung City
- Nickname: Port Edge 港仔墘 (pinyin: Gǎngzaǐqián)
- Coordinates: 22°33′16″N 120°21′37″E
- Country: Taiwan
- Region: Southern Taiwan
- City: Kaohsiung City
- Subdivisions: List: 43 villages; 729 neighborhoods

Area
  - Total: 45.4426 km^{2} (17.5455 sq mi)

Population (October 2023)
  - Total: 155,034
  - Density: 3,411.64/km^{2} (8,836.12/sq mi)
- Website: hdao.kcg.gov.tw/en/

Siaogang District (Chinese: 小港區; Hanyu Pinyin: Xiǎogǎng Qū; Tongyong Pinyin: Siǎogǎng Cyu; Wade–Giles: Hsiao^{3}-kang^{3} Ch'ü^{1}; Pe̍h-ōe-jī: Sió-káng-khu lit: Small port District) is a district of Kaohsiung City in southern Taiwan. Before the merging of Kaohsiung City and Kaohsiung County in 2010, Siaogang was the southernmost district in Kaohsiung City. The second largest airport in Taiwan, Kaohsiung International Airport, is located in Siaogang.

== History ==
Siaogang was developed during Dutch era. The Dutch built Ang Moh Harbor as an addition to Anping Harbor in Tainan. After the Dutch were defeated by Koxinga, they left Taiwan. Koxinga's government developed Taiwan as the last stronghold to revive the Ming Dynasty and prepare his troops to fight against the Qing dynasty. He sent one of his men, Wu Yanshang, to expand Siaogang. After the demise of Koxinga, his son and his grandson, the Qing managed to defeat the Kingdom of Tungning and annexed Taiwan.

=== Empire of Japan ===
In 1895, the Qing dynasty ceded Taiwan to Japan in the Treaty of Shimonoseki after losing the First Sino-Japanese War, and Siaogang was used to produce sugar for Japanese. In 1920, the original name of Kang-a-ki (Chinese: 港仔墘; Pe̍h-ōe-jī: Káng-á-kîⁿ) was changed, and the incorporated areas were administered as Kominato Village (小港庄) under Hōzan District, Takao Prefecture. As a heavy industry base in Taiwan during World War II, Siaogang was more heavily bombed by the Allied force than other parts of the city.

=== Republic of China ===
After the war and the handover of Taiwan from Japan to the Republic of China, Siaogang was administrated as Siaogang Township of Kaohsiung County, a third-level government of the Republic of China, under Taiwan Province. Siaogang was annexed by Kaohsiung City and become Siaogang District on 1 July 1979, when Kaohsiung City became a special municipality.

== Geography ==
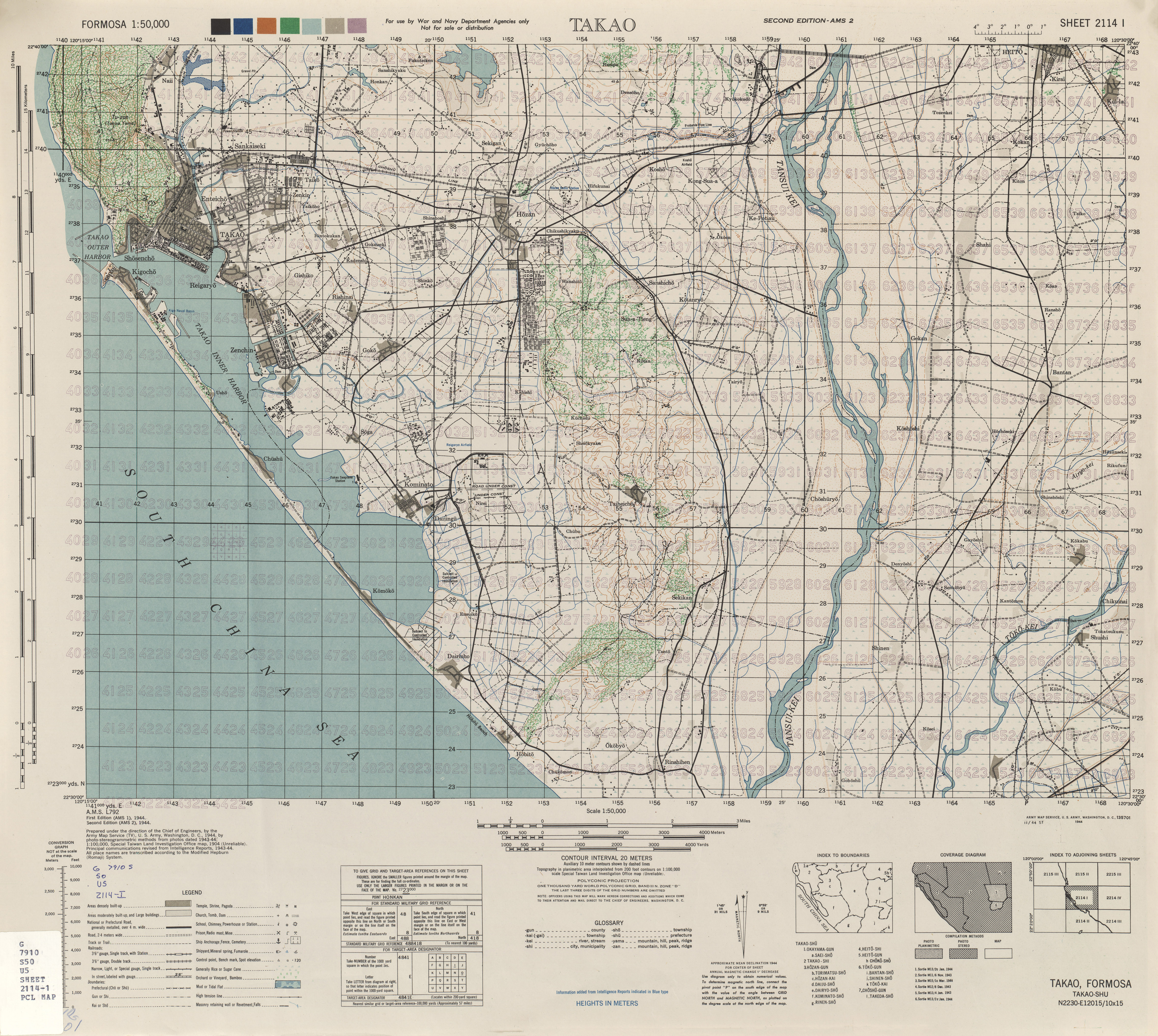
Map of the Kaohsiung city area including Siaogang (labeled as Kominato) (AMS, 1944)

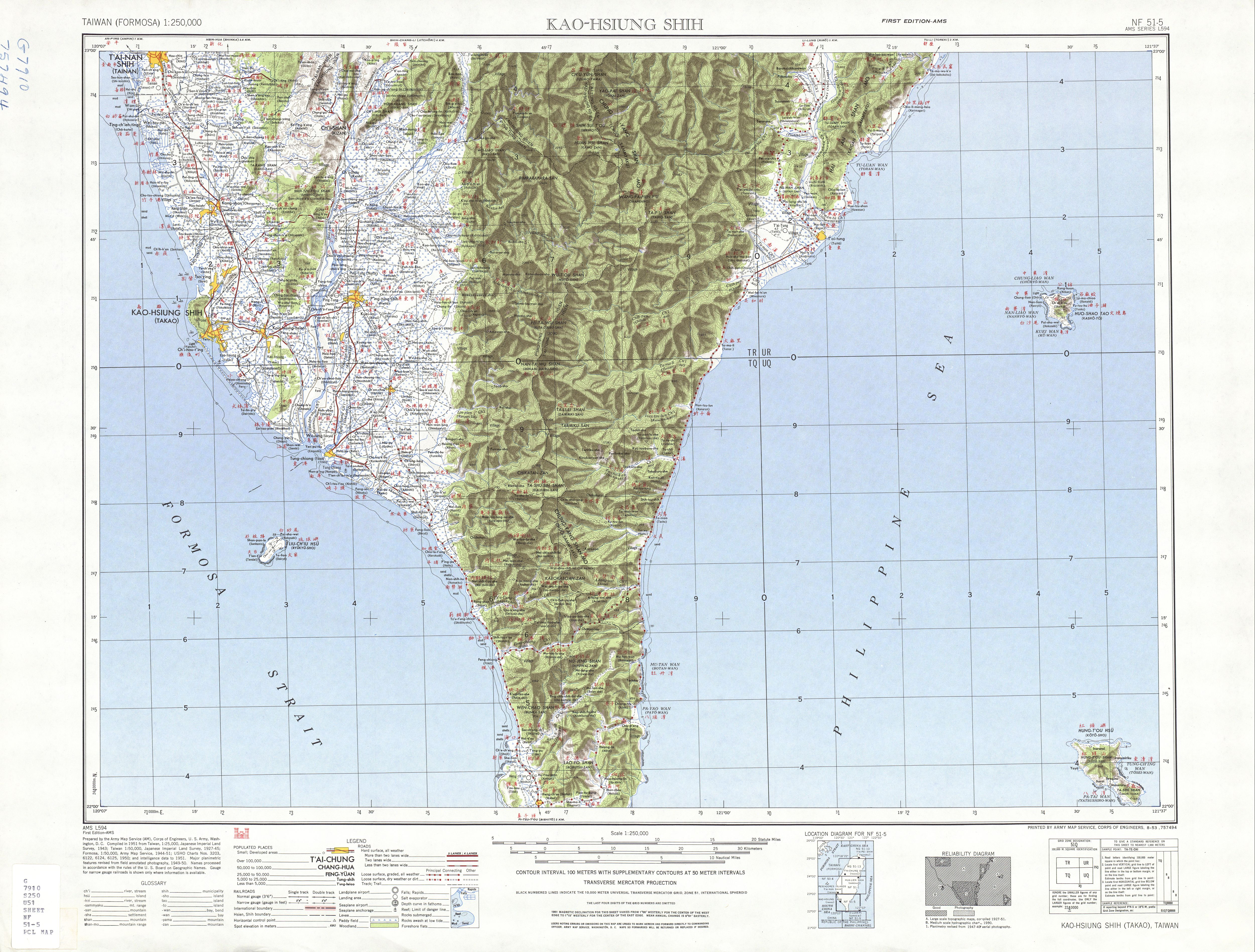
Map of southern Taiwan including Siaogang (labeled as 小港 Hsiao-chiang (Kominato)) (AMS, 1951)

Siaogang is located in the southern part of Kaohsiung. It borders Cianjhen District to the north, Daliao District to the east, Linyuan District to the south, and the Taiwan Strait to the west.

== Administrative divisions ==
The district consists of Xiaogang, Gangkou, Gangzheng, Gangqi, Gangming, Ganghou, Gangnan, Gangxing, Fenggong, Dianzhen, Daling, Erling, Sanling, Zhengling, Shunling, Liuling, Hongliang, Shantung, Jingdao, Jinan, Taishan, Shanming, Gaosong, Songjin, Songshan, Daping, Pingding, Kongzhai, Xiazhuang, Gezuo, Guilin, Zhongcuo, Fengming, Longfeng, Fengsen, Fenglin, Fengxing and Fengyuan Village.

== Economy ==
As far as the industry of Taiwan is concerned, Siaogang is one of the most important regions for the shipbuilding and steel industries. During the 1970s, the government spent 5 years carrying out Ten Major Construction Projects. Two companies resulting from the projects are based here: China Steel and CSBC Corporation, Taiwan. CPC Corporation, Taiwan also a part of the ten projects, has a major oil refinery facility located here. With the proximity of Kaohsiung Harbor, the products of these companies are exported worldwide. These products are also transported throughout the island via National Highway No. 1 (Taiwan), which terminates on the northern border of the district.

== Education ==
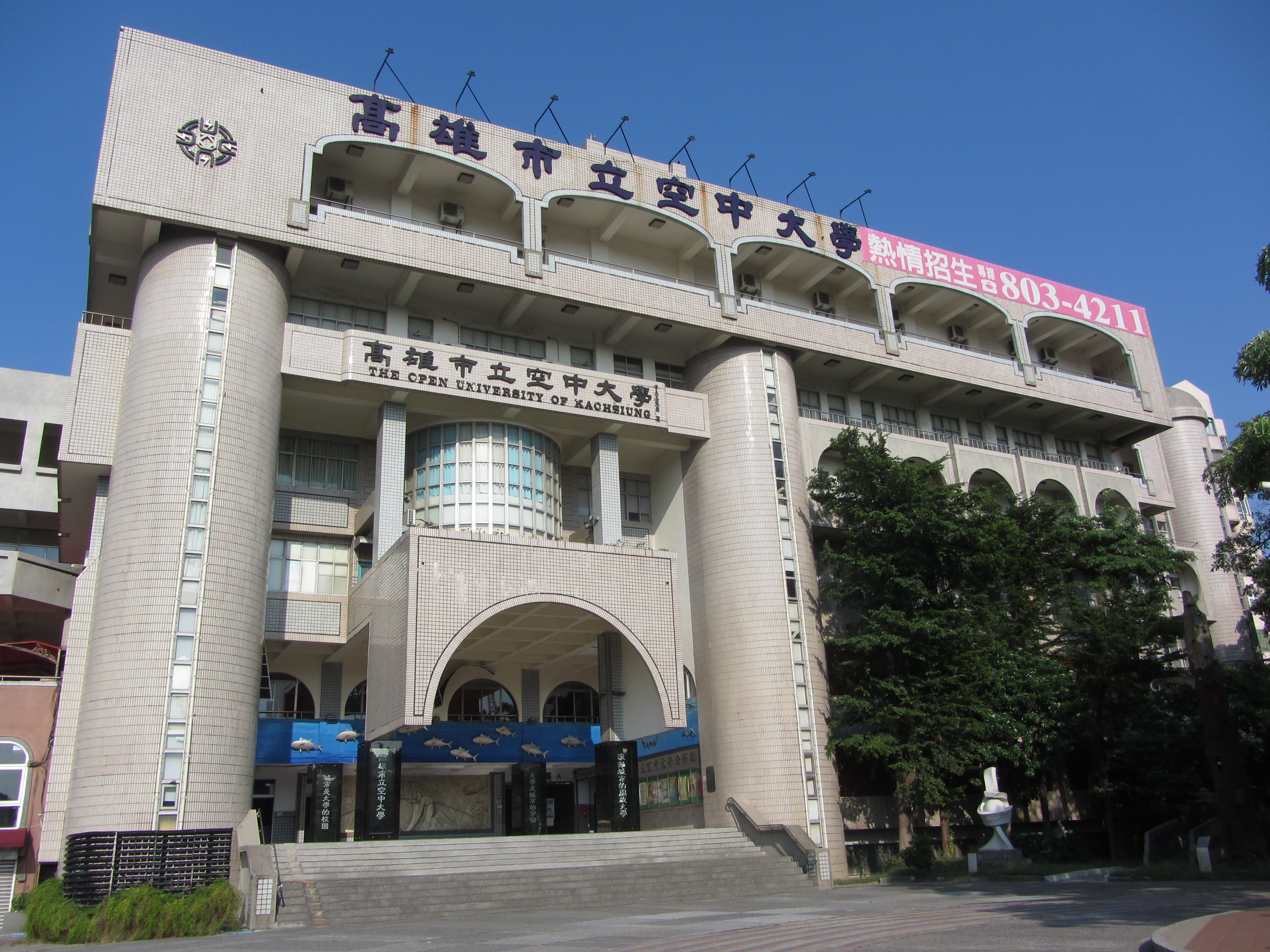
Open University of Kaohsiung

=== Elementary schools ===
- Kaohsiung Municipal Siaogang Elementary School
- Kaohsiung Municipal Taiping Elementary School
- Kaohsiung Municipal Cingshan Elementary School
- Kaohsiung Municipal Pingding Elementary School
- Kaohsiung Municipal Fonglin Elementary School
- Kaohsiung Municipal Huashan Elementary School
- Kaohsiung Municipal Fongyang Elementary School
- Kaohsiung Municipal Huashan Elementary School
- Kaohsiung Municipal Ganghe Elementary School
- Kaohsiung Municipal Mingyi Elementary School
- Kaohsiung Municipal Erling Elementary School
- Kaohsiung Municipal Guilin Elementary School
- Kaohsiung Municipal Hanmin Elementary School
- Kaohsiung Municipal Fongming Elementary School

=== Junior high schools ===
- Kaohsiung Municipal Siaogang Junior High School
- Kaohsiung Municipal Jhongshan Junior High School
- Kaohsiung Municipal Mingyi Junior High School
- Kaohsiung Municipal Fonglin Junior High School
- Kahosiung Municipal Hospitality Junior High School

=== Senior High Schools ===
- The Affiliated Hospitality Senior High School of National Kaohsiung University of Hospitality and

=== Universities ===
- National Kaohsiung University of Hospitality and Tourism
- Open University of Kaohsiung

== Tourist attractions ==
- Dapingding Tropical Botanical Garden
- Hongmaogang Cultural Park
- Kaohsiung Astronomical Museum
- Kaohsiung Municipal Social Education Hall
- Kaohsiung Park: The name comes from its shape: it is built in the shape of Chinese character "高" (pronounced "Gao", meaning high, tall). It was once a lighthouse. After the building of second harbor of Kaohsiung, it was renewed and became a tourist attraction. The shape of the building is not only a Chinese character but also represent the spirit of Kaohsiung.
- Dalinpu Fenglin Temple, established in 1697 and often referred as the "Three Ong Yah Temple"

== Infrastructure ==
- Talin Power Plant

== Transportation ==
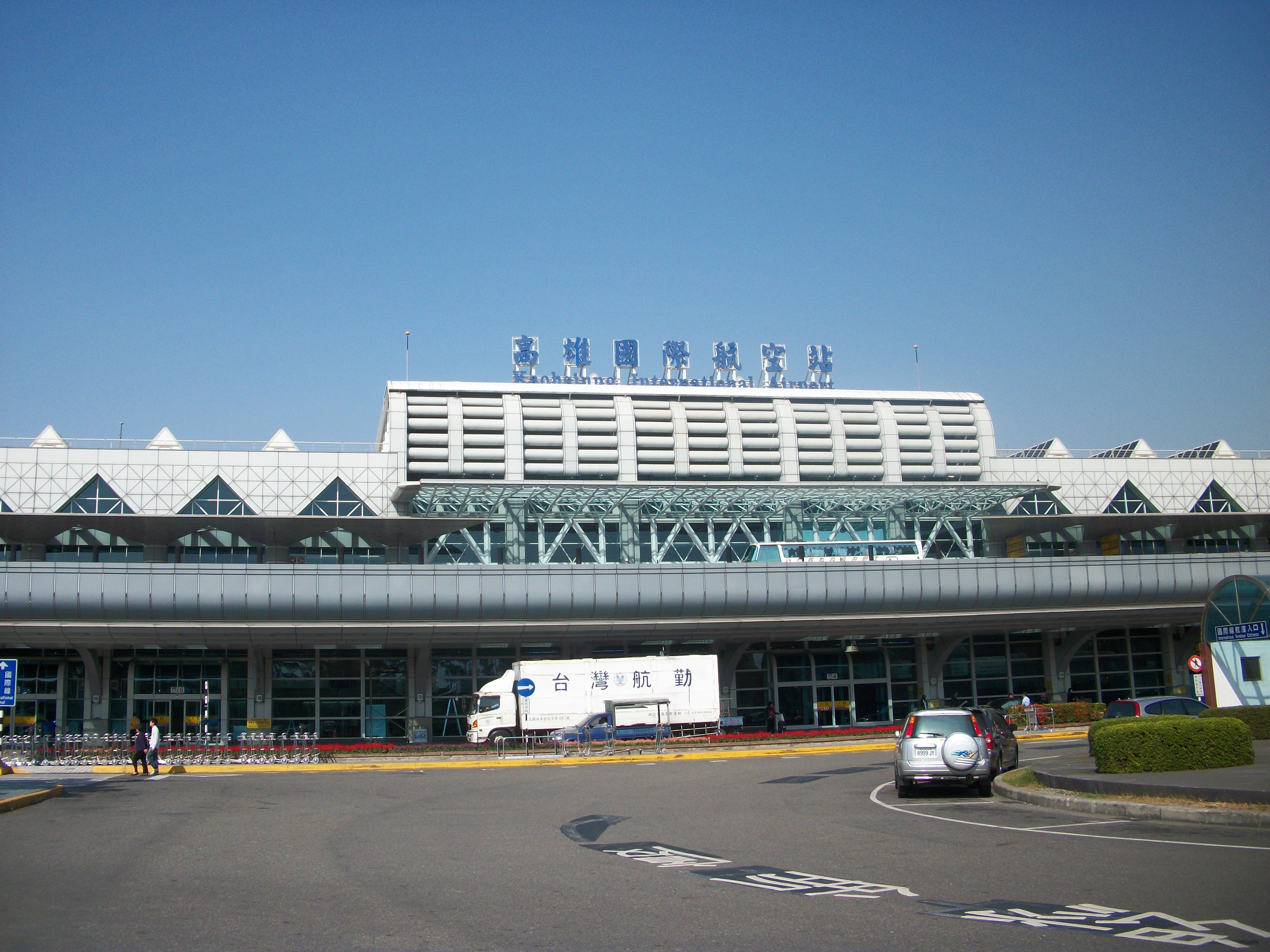
Kaohsiung International Airport

=== Air ===
The Kaohsiung International Airport is located within the district

=== Railway ===
The district is accessible by Kaohsiung International Airport Station and Siaogang Station of the Kaohsiung Mass Rapid Transit.

== Notable natives ==
- Sung Chi-li, cult leader and geomancer
- Huang Ching-ya, politician
