= Talin Power Plant =

Power plant in Xiaogang, Kaohsiung, Taiwan

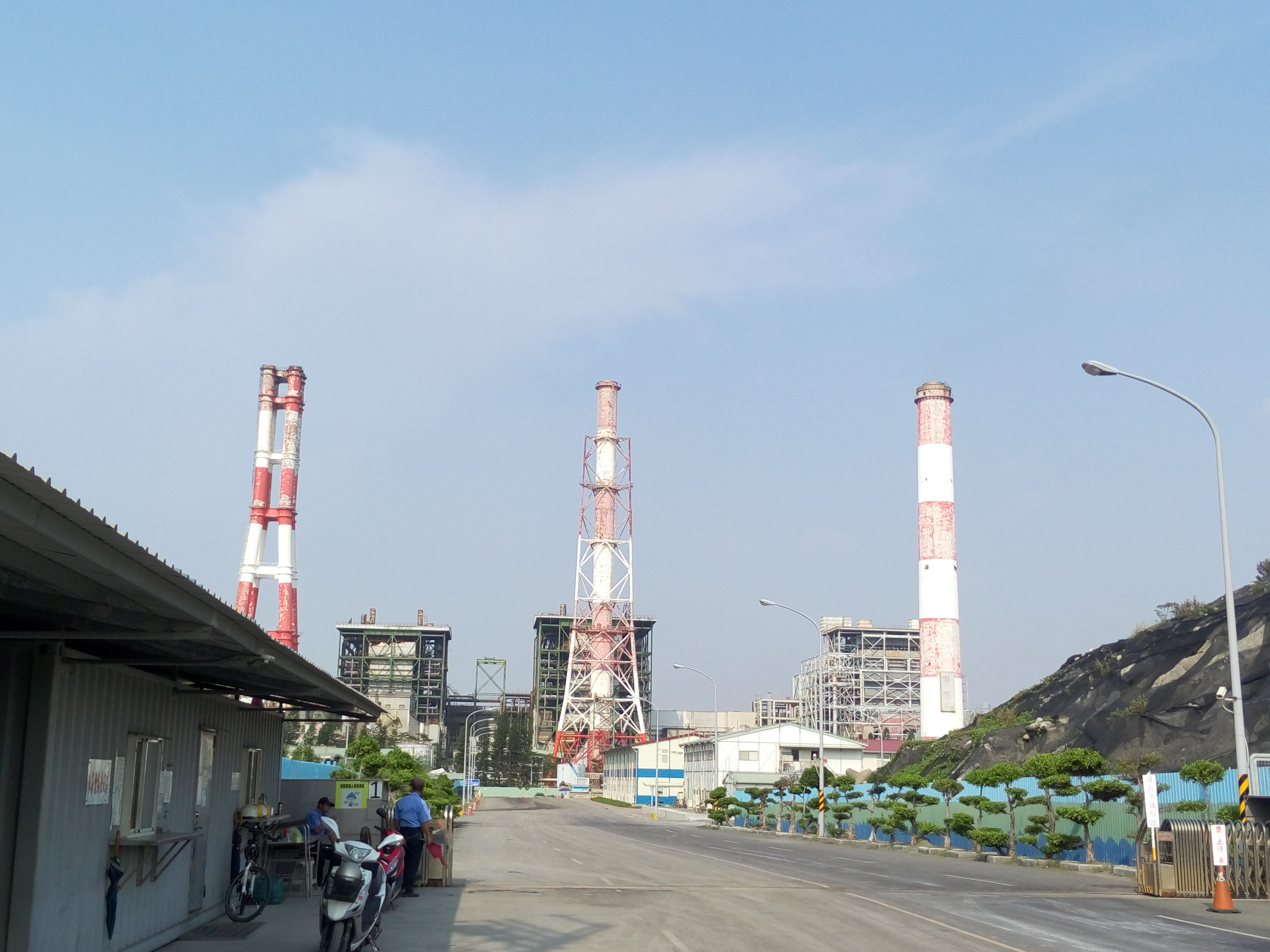
- Official name: 大林發電廠
- Country: Republic of China
- Location: Siaogang, Kaohsiung, Taiwan
- Coordinates: 22°32′10″N 120°20′8″E
- Status: Operational
- Construction began: 1967
- Commission date: 1969; 2018 (1 X 800 MW unit); 2019 (1 X 800 MW unit)
- Decommission date: 2012: 2 X 300 MW Coal; 2017: 2 X 375 MW oil
- Owner: Taipower
- Operator: Taipower

Thermal power station
- Primary fuel: Coal, oil, natural gas

Power generation
- Units operational: 2 X 800 MW (coal); 500 MW (LNG and oil); 550 MW (LNG and oil)
- Make and model: Mitsubishi Heavy Industries; General Electric
- Nameplate capacity: 2,400 MW

External links
- Commons: Related media on Commons

The Talin Power Plant (traditional Chinese: 大林發電廠; simplified Chinese: 大林发电厂; pinyin: Dàlín Fādiànchǎng) or Dalin Power Plant is a mix-generation power plant in Siaogang District, Kaohsiung, Taiwan.

As of November 2022 it has four operational units: two 800 MW ultra-supercritical coal-fired units, which went into commercial operation on February 13, 2018 and October 24, 2019, a 500 MW gas-fired unit, which went into commercial operation on October 15, 1975 and a 550 MW gas-fired unit, which went into commercial operation on September 12, 1994.

== Fuel supply ==
The plant receives its coal supply for the fuel from Indonesia (49%), Australia (46%), Russia (4%) and Colombia (1%) to the adjacent Port of Kaohsiung and by conveyor to the plant from the port.

== Events ==
The power plant was commissioned in 1969.

=== 31 August 2012 ===
The two coal-fired 300-MW-units were decommissioned on August 31, 2012. These two units will be replaced by two 800 MW ultra supercritical units from the current existing low-efficiency units. The construction permit was given on 25 October 2011 by the Ministry of Economic Affairs and scheduled for commercial operation on 1 July 2016 and 1 July 2017 respectively.

=== 29 May 2016 ===
Two workers killed and fiver others injured when the scaffolding used by them for work collapsed.

=== 19 October 2016 ===
One generator of the plant tripped at 7:32 a.m. and was rectified four hours later.

=== 8 August 2017 ===
The ignition of the first stage of ultra supercritical steam generator at the plant of 200 MW capacity in stages until it reaches its total capacity of 800 MW in the coming weeks.

=== 3 November 2017 ===
The two oil-fired 375-MW-units were decommissioned on November 3, 2017.

=== July 2018 ===
The number one generator of the plant experienced mechanical failure on 28 July 2018. Inspection was carried out two days later on 30 July 2018.

== Awards ==
On 8 November 2010, the power plant won the outstanding award at the 23rd National QCC Competition, organized by Industrial Development Bureau of the Ministry of Economic Affairs.

== Transportation ==
The power plant is accessible South West from Siaogang Station of Kaohsiung MRT.

== See also ==
- List of power stations in Taiwan
- Electricity sector in Taiwan
