= Siaogang metro station =

Metro station in Kaohsiung, Taiwan

Siaogang R3 小港
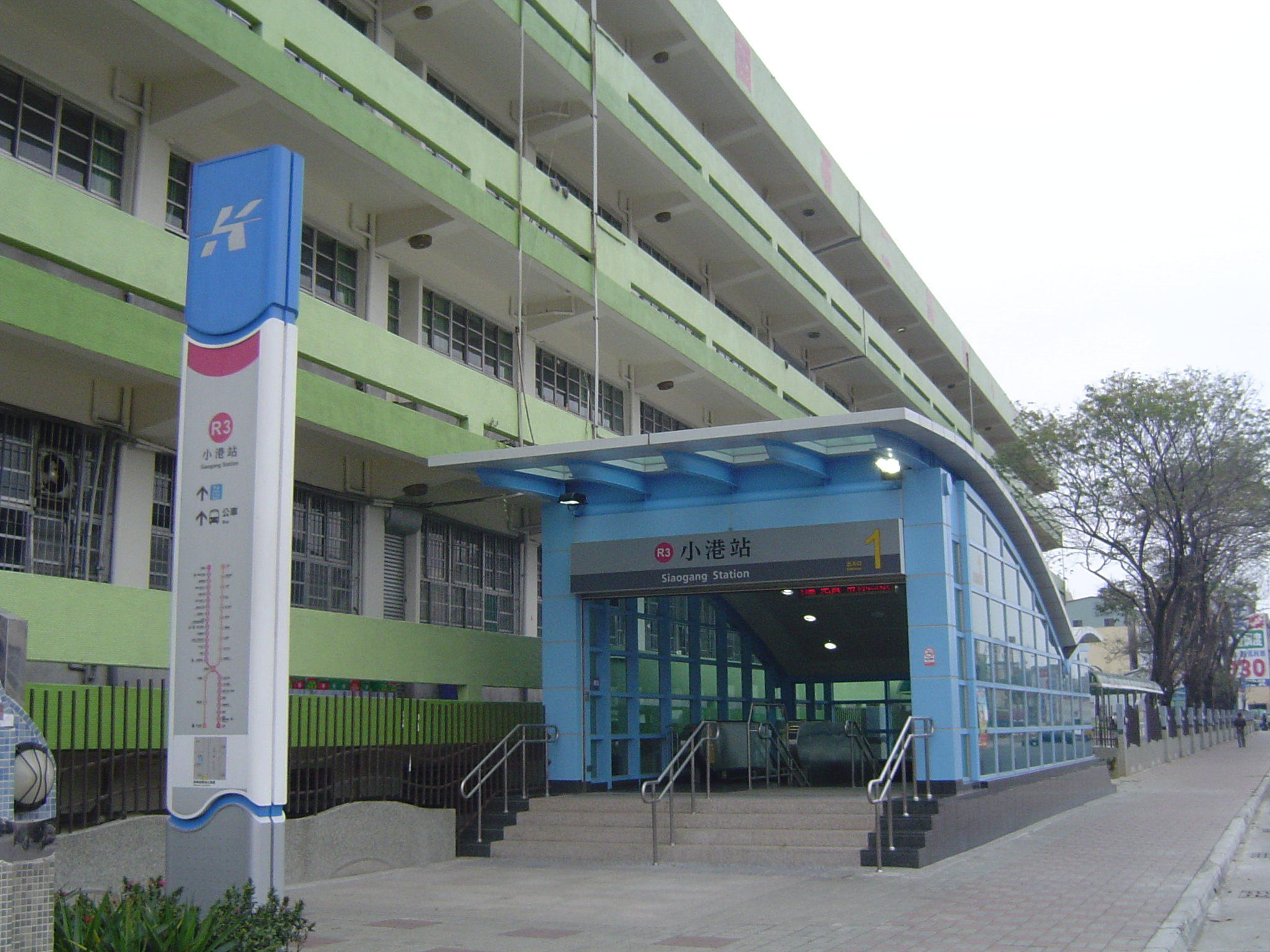
- Siaogang station exit

Chinese name
- Traditional Chinese: 小港車站
- Simplified Chinese: 小港车站
Transcriptions
Standard Mandarin
- Hanyu Pinyin: Xiǎogǎng Chēzhàn
- Bopomofo: ㄒㄧㄠˇ ㄍㄤˇ ㄔㄜ ㄓㄢˋ
- Wade–Giles: Hsiao^{3}gang^{3} Ch'ê^{1}-chan^{4}
- Tongyong Pinyin: Siǎogǎng Chejhàn

General information
- Location: Siaogang, Kaohsiung; Taiwan
- Coordinates: 22°33′53″N 120°21′14″E
- Operated by: Kaohsiung Rapid Transit Corporation
- Line: Red line (R3)
- Platforms: 1 island platform

Construction
- Structure type: Underground

History
- Opened: 2008-03-09

Passengers
- 10,608 daily (Jan. 2011)

Services
| Preceding station | Kaohsiung Metro | Following station |
|---|---|---|
| Kaohsiung International Airport towards Gangshan | Red line | Terminus |
Location

Siaogang is the southern terminus of the Red line of the Kaohsiung Metro in Siaogang District, Kaohsiung, Taiwan.

== Station overview ==
This is a two-level underground station with an island platform and four exits. It is 215 metres long and is located at the intersection of Yanhai Rd. and Hanmin Rd. It is the southernmost metro station in Taiwan.

It is the terminus for the planned Linyuan extension line.

== Around the station ==
- China Steel
- Kaohsiung Municipal Social Education Hall
- Linhai Industrial Park
- National Kaohsiung University of Hospitality and Tourism
- Talin Power Plant
- Kaohsiung Municipal Siaogang Junior High School
- Kaohsiung Municipal Erming Elementary School
