= List of parks in Taiwan =

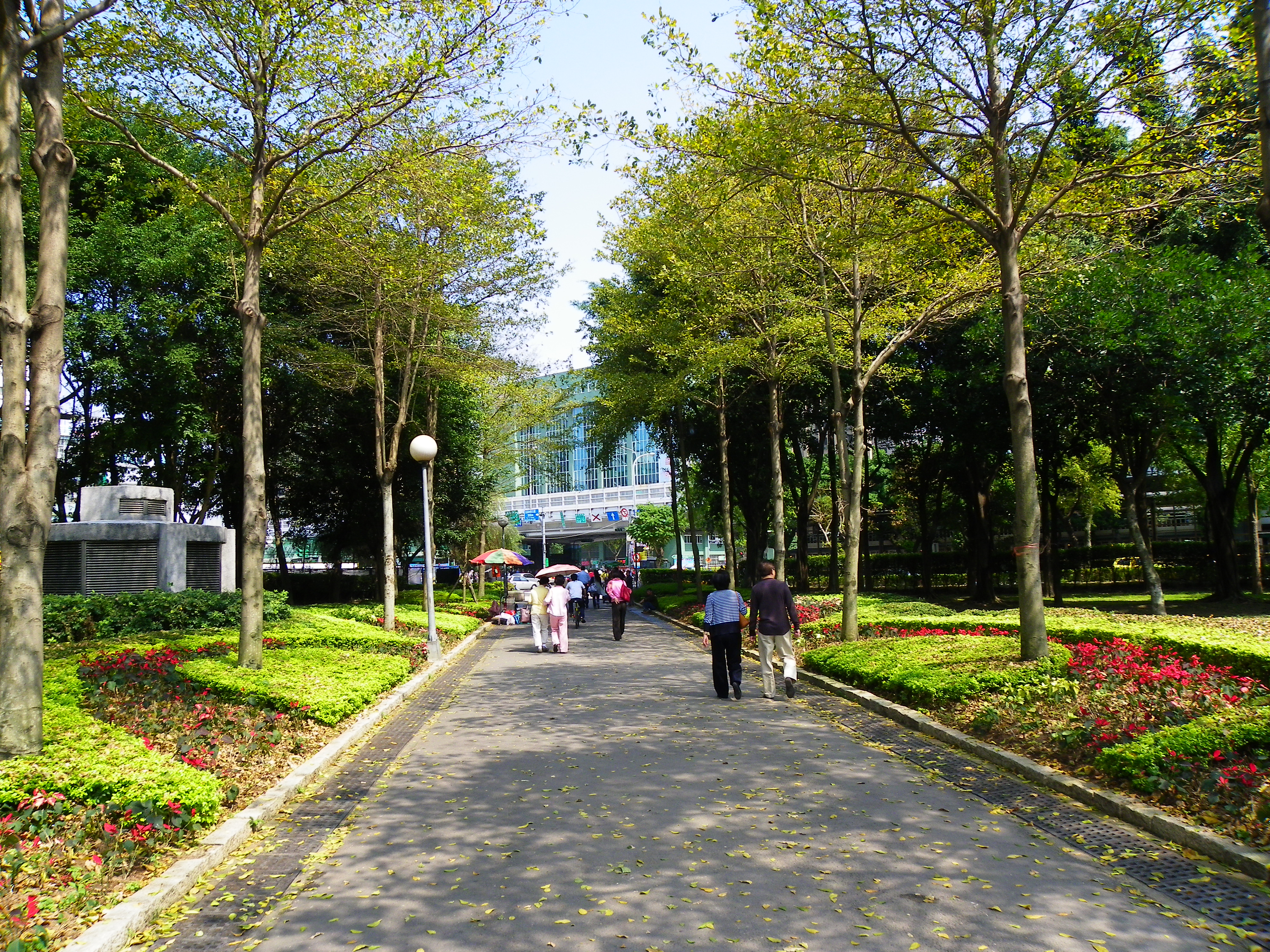
Daan Forest Park, Taipei

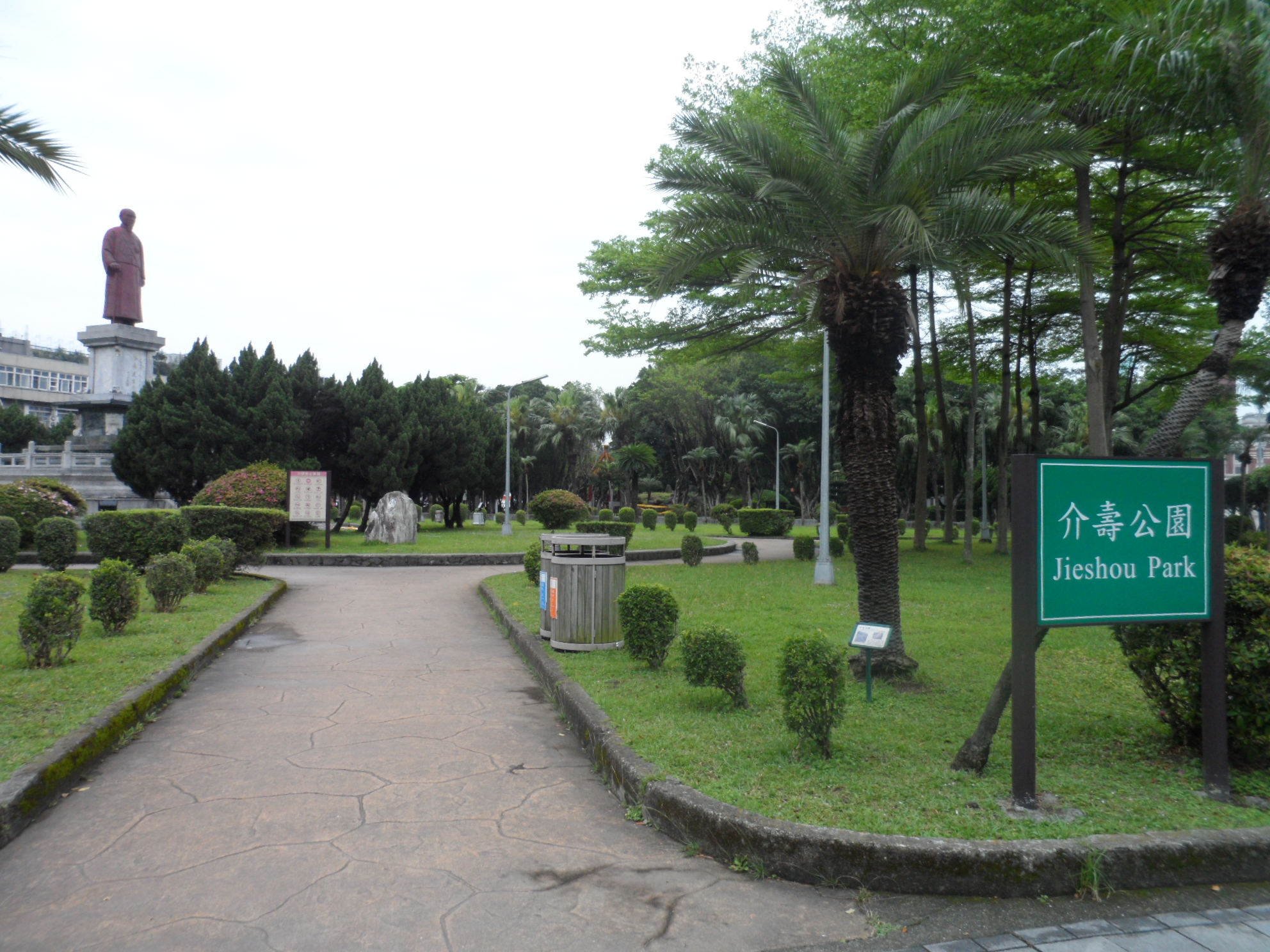
Jieshou Park, Taipei

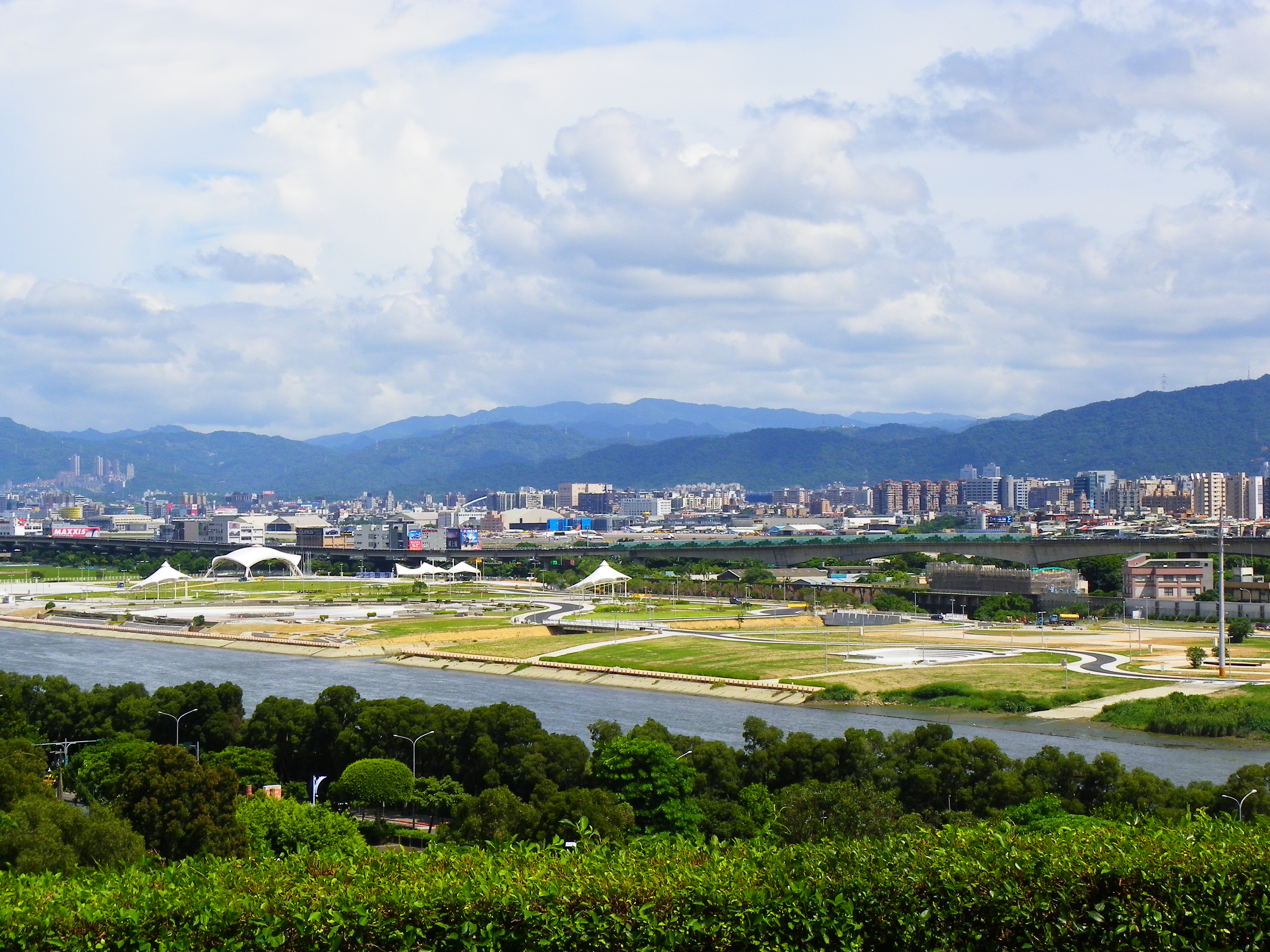
Dajia Riverside Park, Taipei

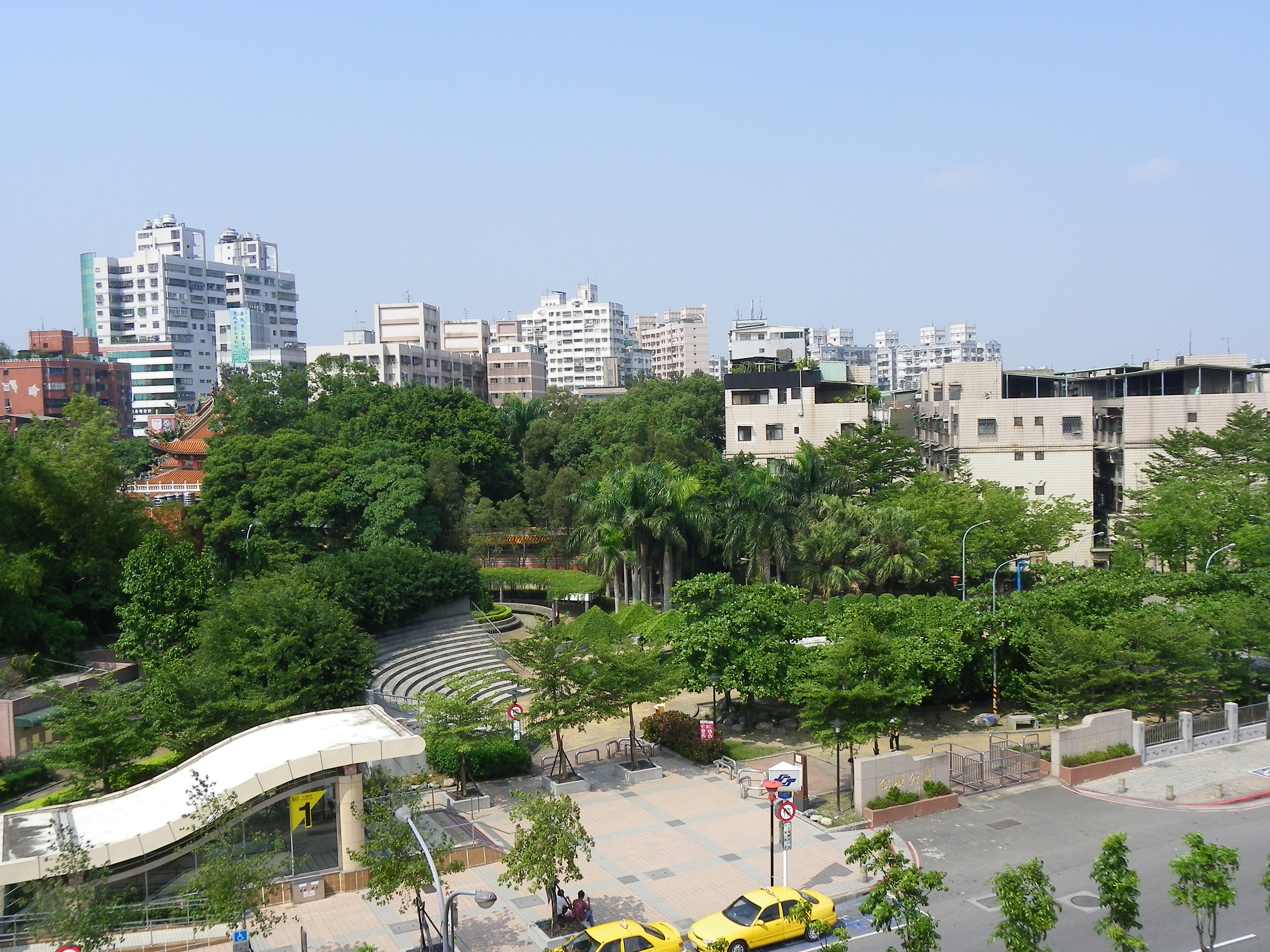
Kinchen Park, New Taipei

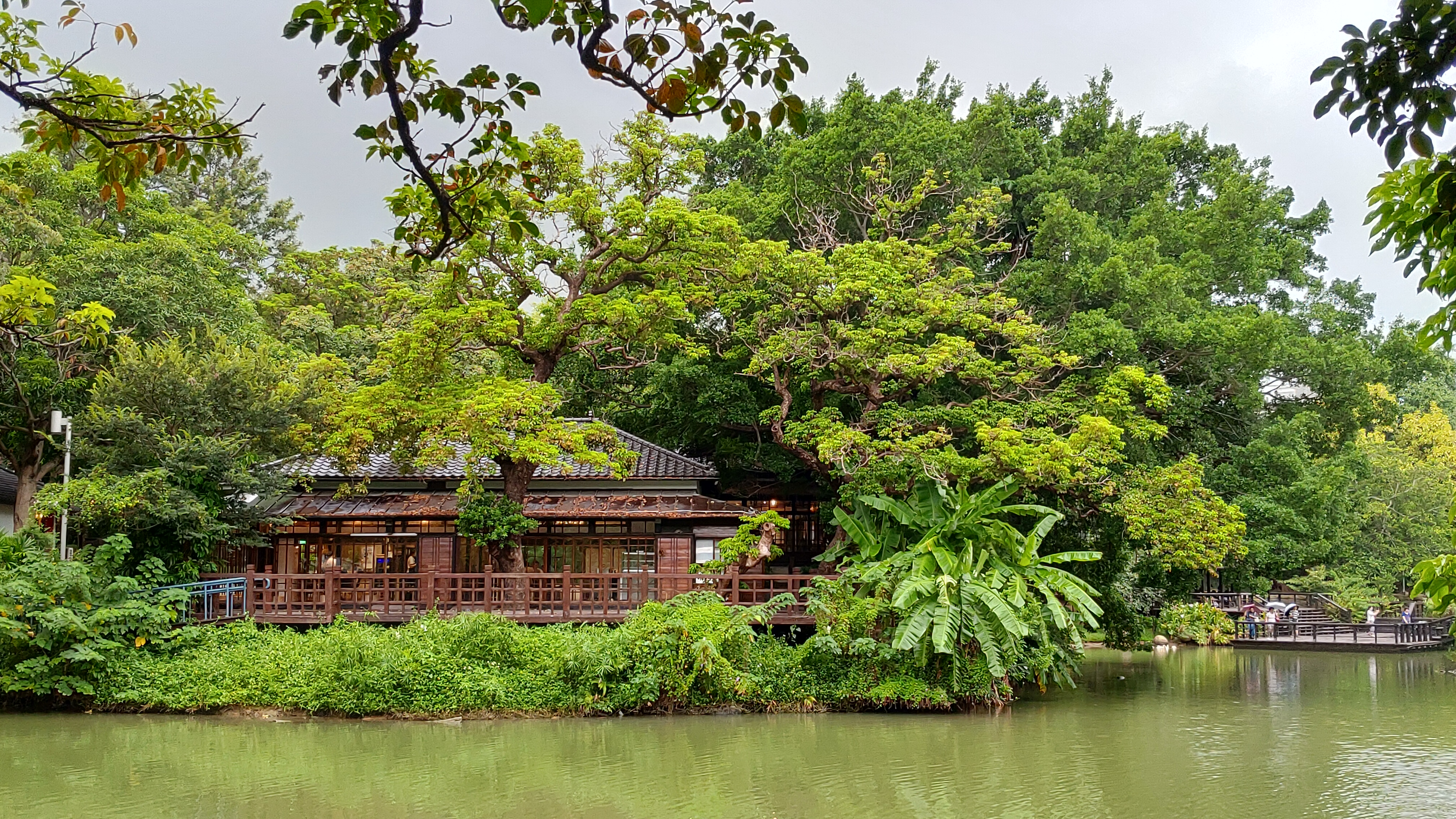
Hsinchu Park, Hsinchu

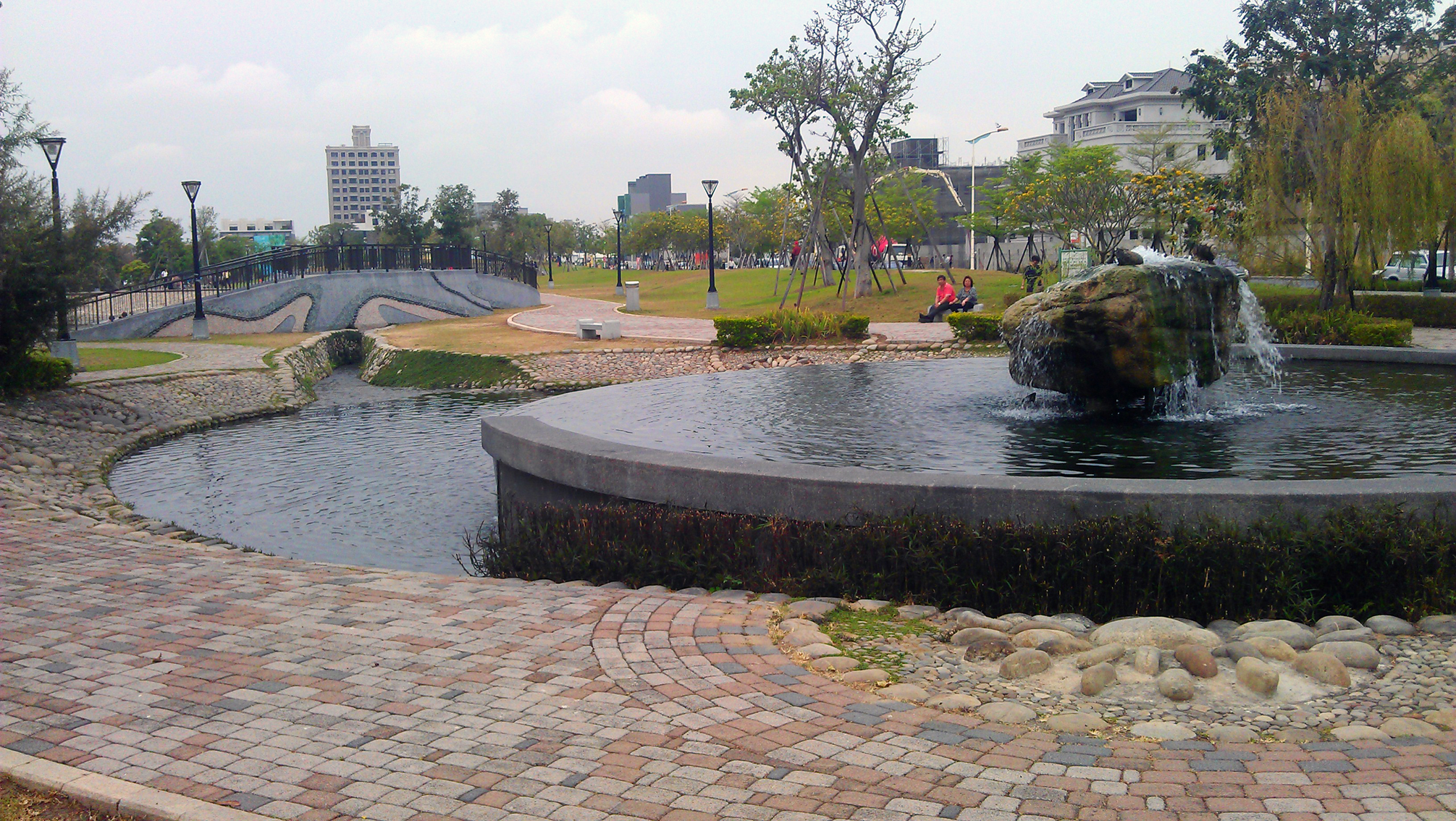
Taichung New Capital Ecological Park, Taichung

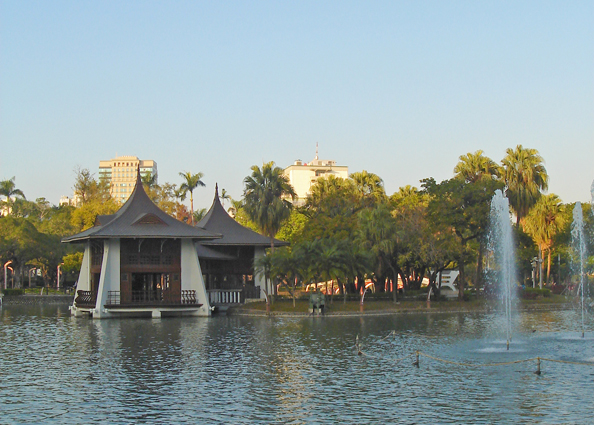
Taichung Park, Taichung

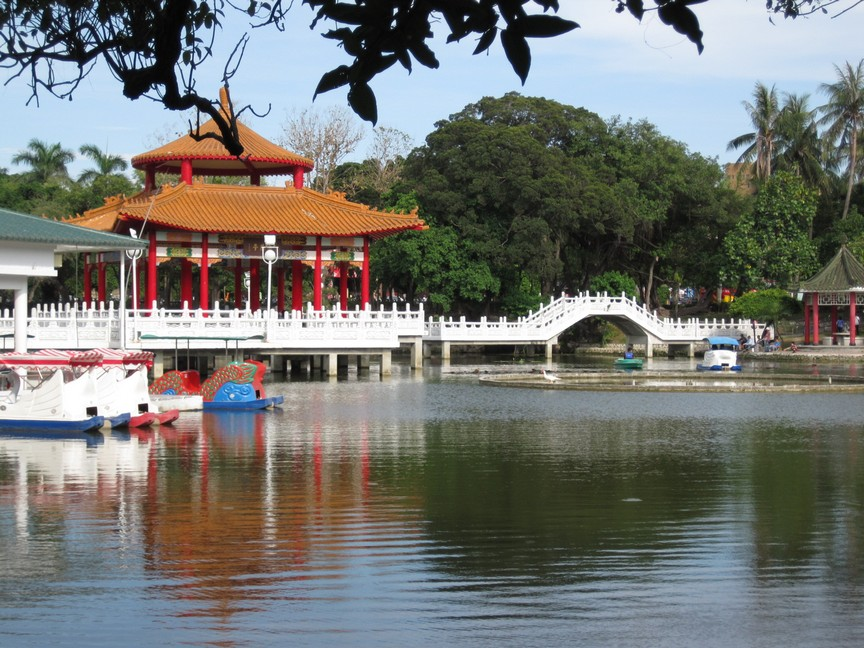
Tainan Park, Tainan

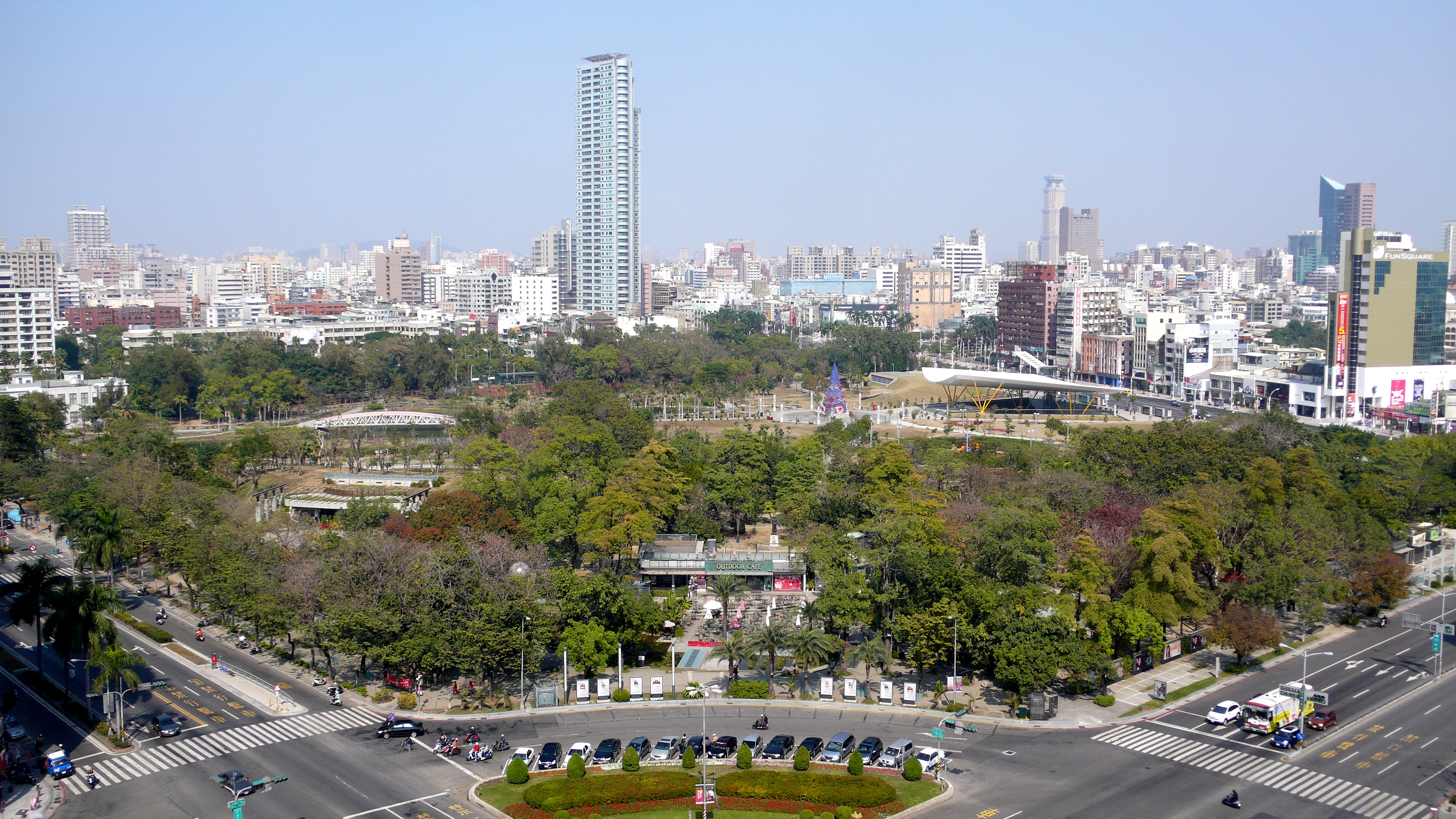
Central Park, Kaohsiung

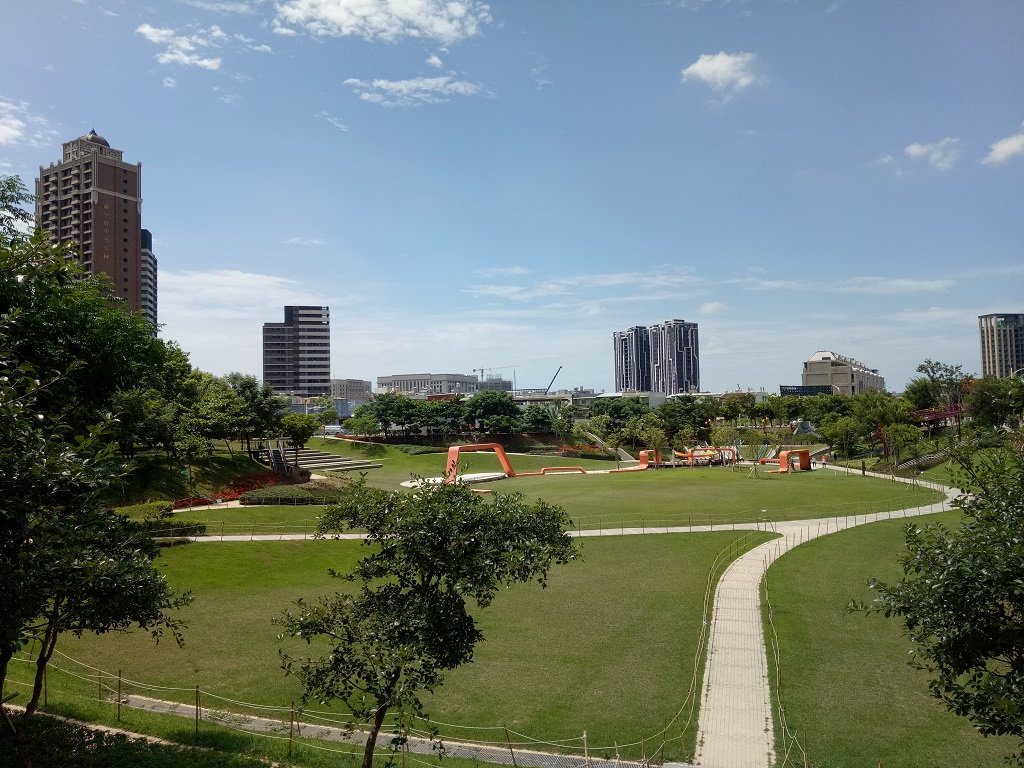
Fenghe Park, Taoyuan

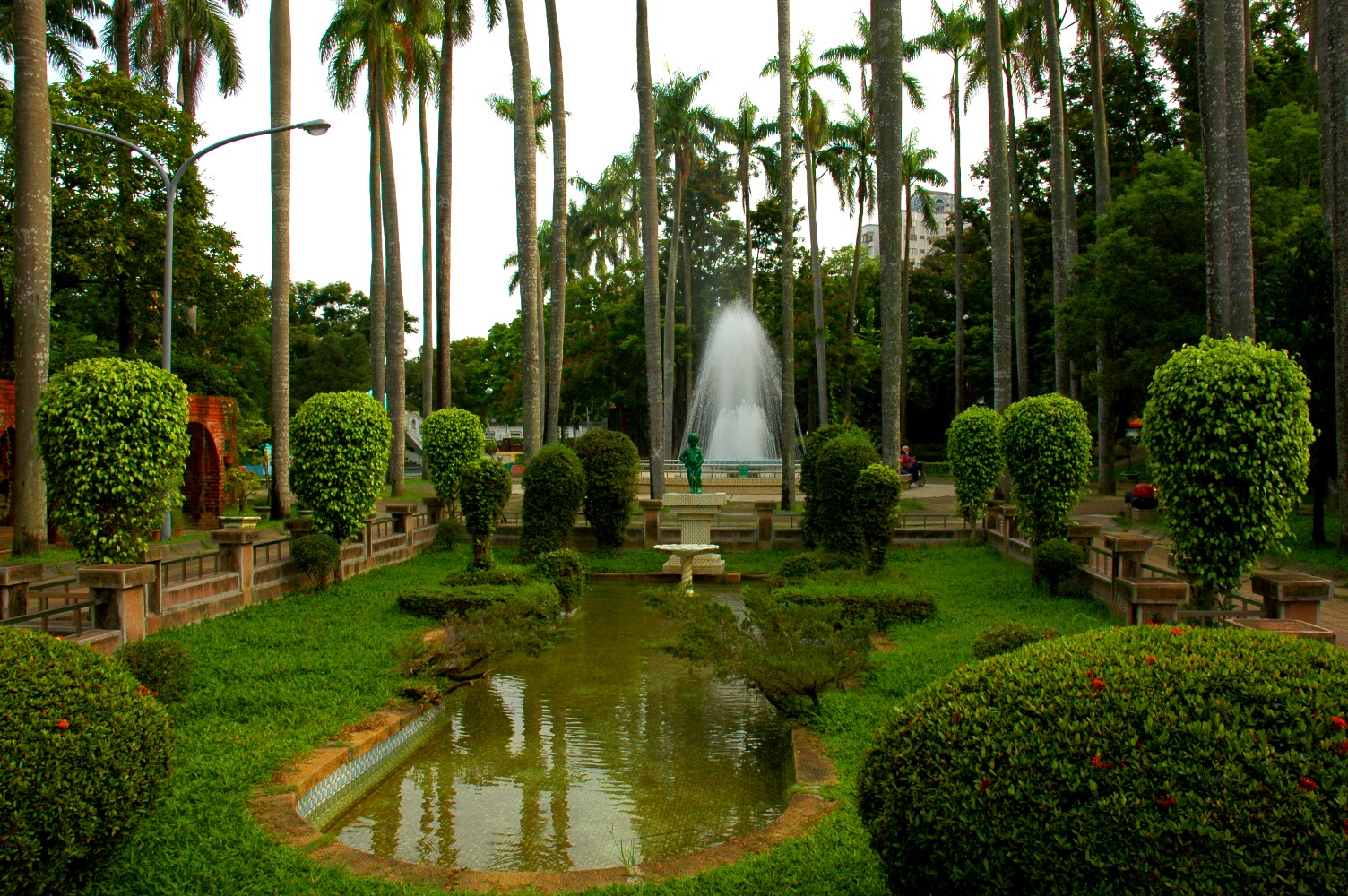
Chiayi Park, Chiayi City

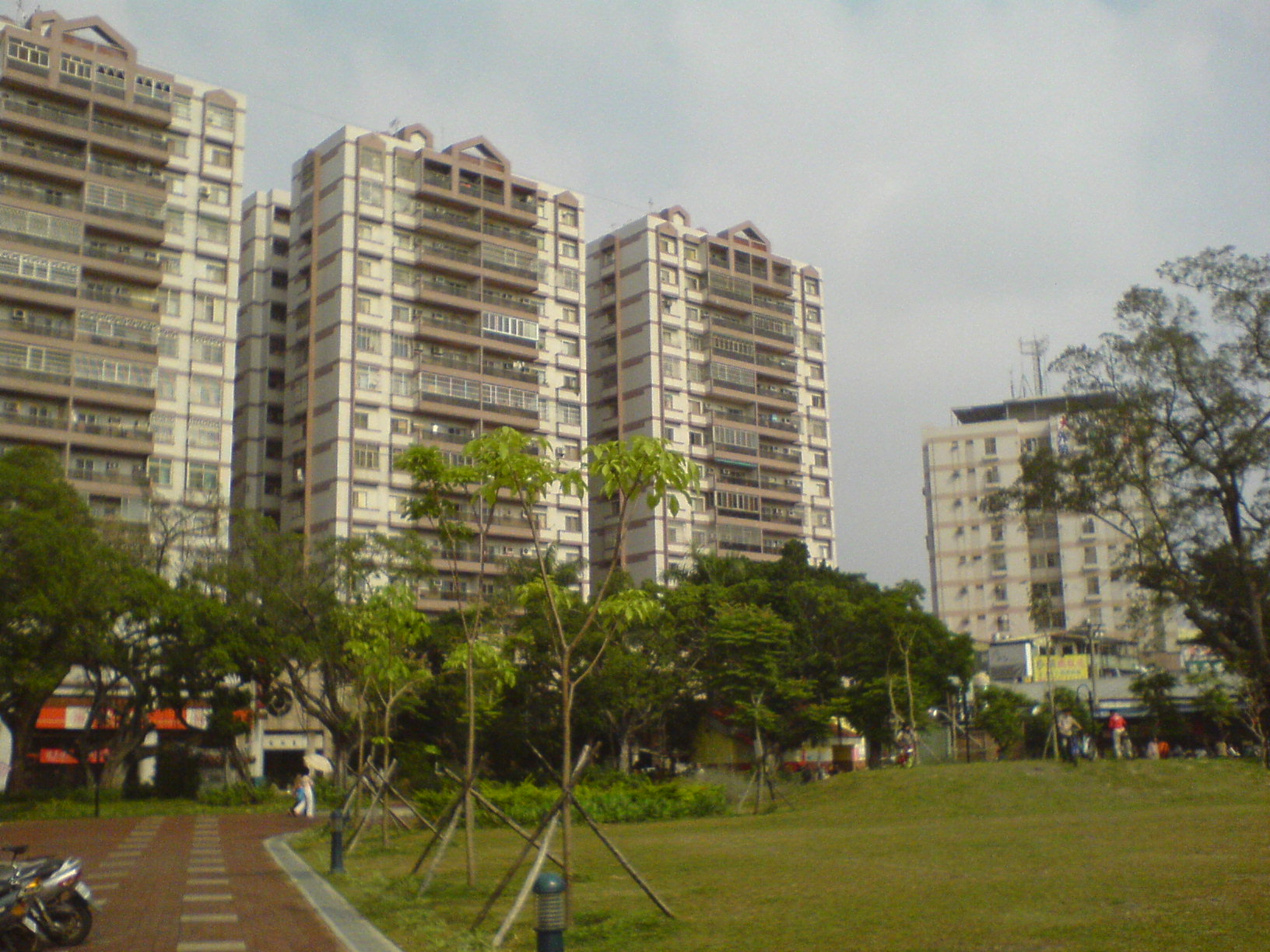
Yuanlin Park, Changhua County

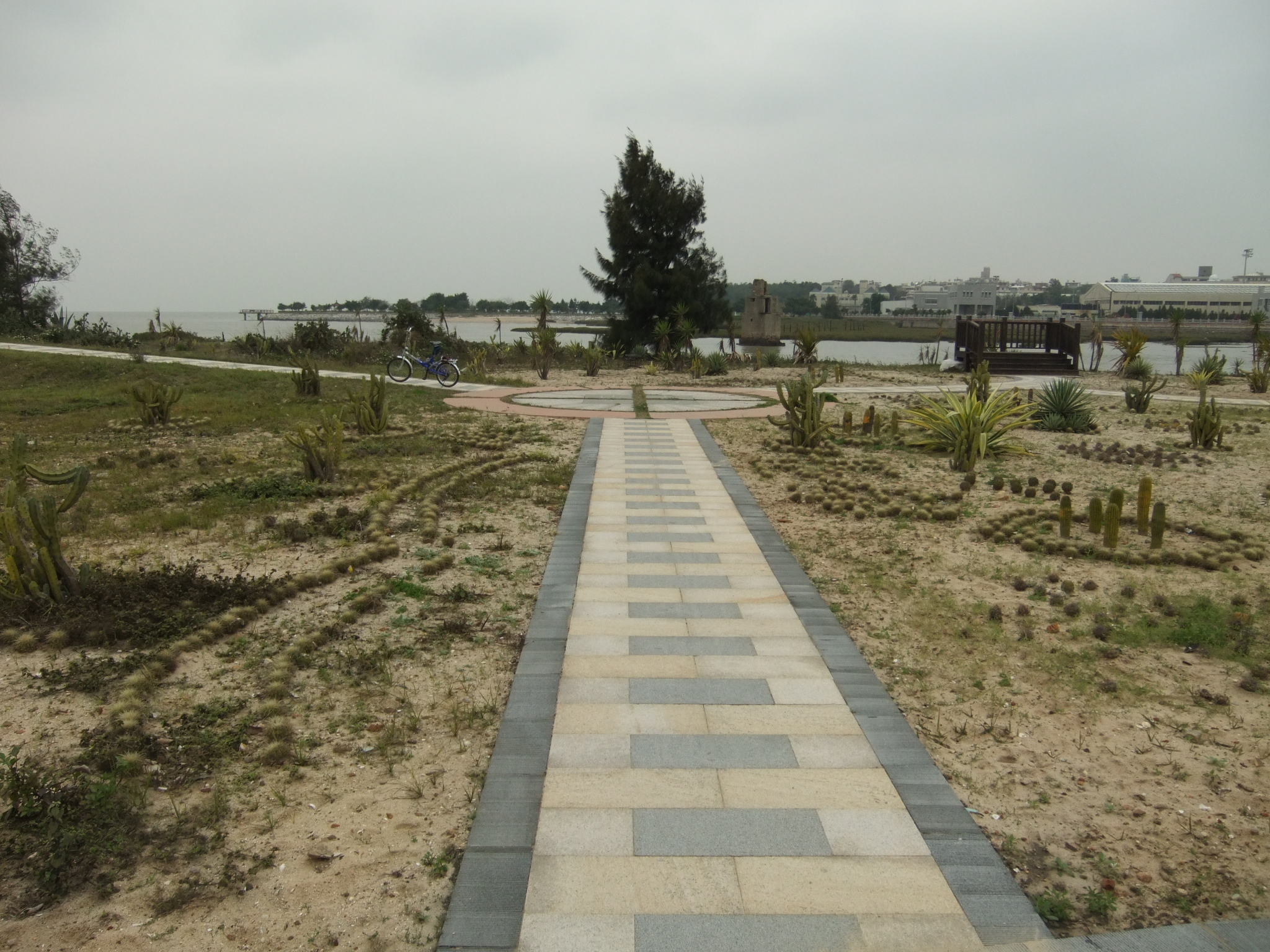
Jincheng Seaside Park, Kinmen County

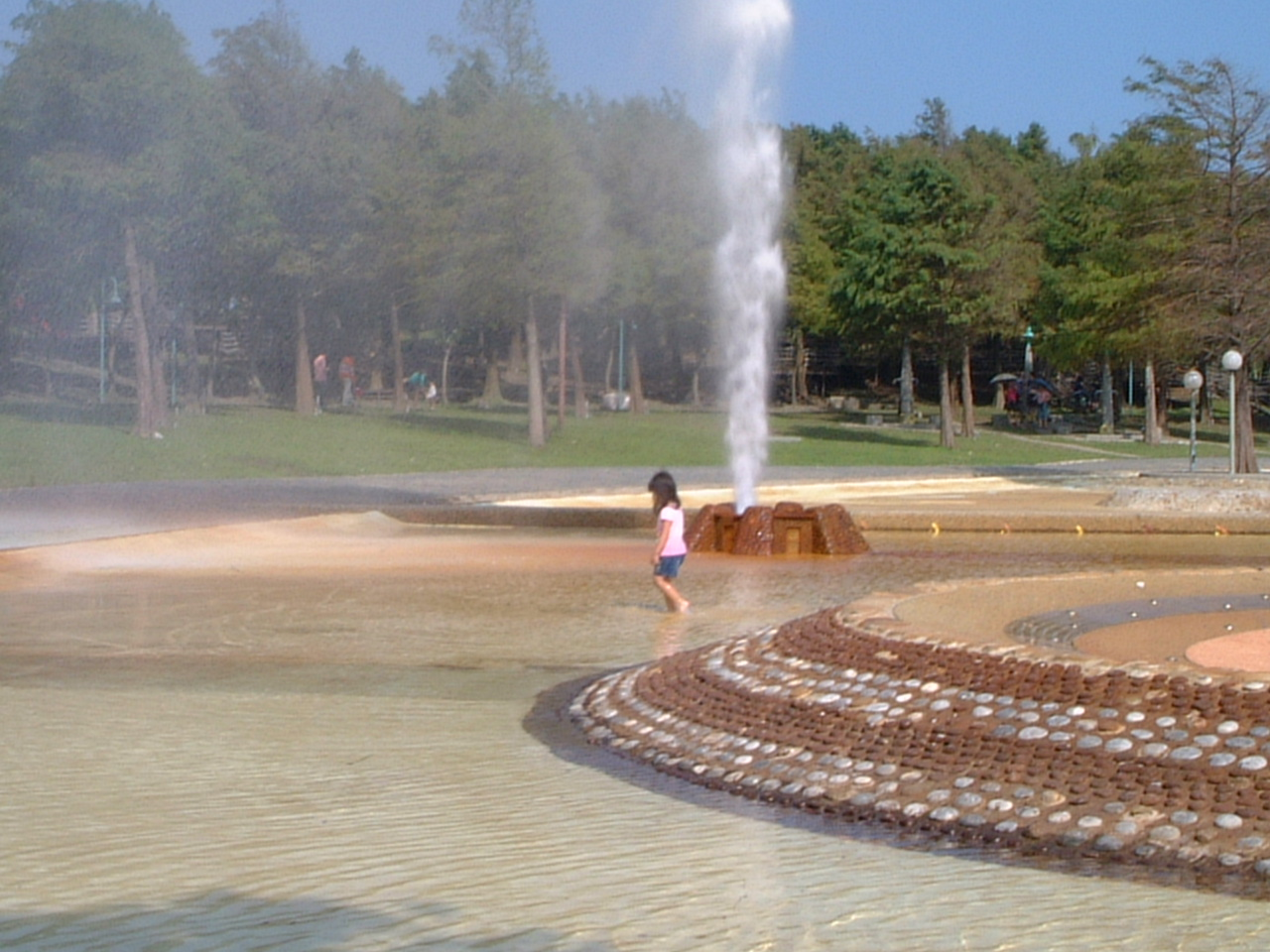
Dongshan River Water Park, Yilan County

This is a list of parks in Taiwan.

== Taipei ==
- 228 Peace Memorial Park
- Bailing Sport Park
- Bangka Park
- Beitou Park
- Bihu Park
- Chengmei Riverside Park
- Daan Forest Park
- Dahu Park
- Dajia Riverside Park
- Fudekeng Environmental Restoration Park
- Guandu Nature Park
- Guanshan Riverside Park
- Jieshou Park
- Meiti Riverside Park
- Nangang Park
- Nanxing Park
- Rongxing Garden Park
- Sanmin Park
- Shanshuilu Eco Park
- Shingyi Plaza
- Shuangxi Park and Chinese Garden
- Songshan Cultural and Creative Park
- Taipei Botanical Garden
- Taipei Cinema Park
- Taipei Water Park
- Xiangshan Park
- Xinzhong Park
- Yingfeng Riverside Park
- Youth Park
- Zhongshan Linear Park

== New Taipei ==
- Erchong Lotus Park
- Erchong Riverside Park
- Kinchen Park
- Stone Sculpture Park

== Taoyuan ==
- Fenghe Park

== Taichung ==
- Fengle Sculpture Park
- Lüshun Park
- Taichung Metropolitan Park
- Taichung New Capital Ecological Park
- Taichung Park

== Kaohsiung ==
- Central Park
- Dapingding Tropical Botanical Garden
- Gangshan Park
- Gushan Park
- Jhongdou Wetlands Park
- Kaohsiung Metropolitan Park
- Kaohsiung Park
- Niaosong Wetland Park
- Shaochuantou Park
- Siaogangshan Skywalk Park
- War and Peace Memorial Park
- Water Tower Park
- Weiwuying Metropolitan Park
- Youchang Forest Park

== Tainan ==
- Barclay Memorial Park
- Cahamu Indigenous People Park
- Jacana Ecological Education Park
- Qigu Mangrove Tourist Park
- Shuipingwen Park
- Tainan Metropolitan Park
- Tainan Park
- Tainan Wu Garden
- Tang Te-chang Memorial Park
- Yongkang Park

== Chiayi City ==
- Chiayi Botanical Garden
- Chiayi Park

== Hsinchu City ==
- Hsinchu Park
- Huchenghe Riverside Park
- Zhongyang Park

== Keelung City ==
- Chaojing Park
- Heping Island Park
- Zhongzheng Park

== Changhua County ==
- Alice's Garden
- Changhua Fitzroy Gardens
- Yuanlin Park

== Chiayi County ==
- Meishan Park
- Wu Feng Park

== Hualien County ==
- Matai'an Wetland Ecological Park
- Qixingtan Coast Park

== Kinmen County ==
- Houhu Seashore Park
- Jincheng Seaside Park
- Zhongzheng Park

== Lienchiang County ==
- Shengtian Park

== Miaoli County ==
- Dongxing Riverside Park
- Ren'ai Park

== Nantou County ==
- Jiji Military History Park
- Songbailun Natural Park

== Pingtung County ==
- Linhousilin Forest Park
- Longpan Park
- Pingtung Park
- Sheding Nature Park

== Taitung County ==
- Beinan Cultural Park
- Guanshan Waterfront Park
- Taitung Forest Park

== Yilan County ==
- Dongshan River Water Park
- Jiuliao River Ecological Park
- Luodong Forestry Culture Park
- Luodong Sports Park
- Wulaokeng Scenic Area

== Yunlin County ==
- Erlun Sports Park

== Penghu County ==
- Longgui Park

== See also ==
- List of national parks in Taiwan
- List of tourist attractions in Taiwan
