= Shanshuilu Eco Park =

Park in Nangang, Taipei, Taiwan

- 山水綠生態公園
- Interactive map of Shanshuilu Eco Park
- Type: park
- Location: Nangang, Taipei, Taiwan
- Coordinates: 25°01′46.5″N 121°37′16.8″E
- Area: 21 hectares (52 acres)
- Established: June 1994 (as Shanzhuku Landfill); 27 October 2013 (as Shanshuilu Eco Park)
- Designer: AECOM
- Owner: Taipei City Government
- Facilities: Recreational facilities

Shanshuilu Eco Park (traditional Chinese: 山水綠生態公園; simplified Chinese: 山水绿生态公园; pinyin: Shānshuǐlǜ Shēngtài Gōngyuán) is a park in Nangang District, Taipei, Taiwan.

== Name ==
The park was named “Shanshuilu” because its landscape resembles the landscapes described in a poem by Liu Zong-yuan, a poet from the Tang dynasty.

== History ==
The park was originally the Shanzhuku Landfill because it was located in the Shanzhuku Valley. After passing the environmental impact assessment, the landfill began its construction in May 1993. Once it opened in June 1994, it became the second sanitary landfill in Taipei and covered an area of 65 hectares (160 acres). The landfill ground was 30 hectares (74 acres) with a capacity of around 6.17 million cubic metres (218×10^{6} cu ft).

It was then decided to transform the former landfill into the Shanshuilu Eco Park by having the landfill ground filled, covered and converted into green space by vegetation restoration made by the Department of Environmental Protection of Taipei City Government started in 2005. The landfill stopped receiving waste in 2011. Taipei Mayor Hau Lung-pin, accompanied by guides from the Department of Environmental Protection of Taipei City Government, made a visit to the park on 17 April 2013 to see the construction progress. The park was officially opened on 27 October 2013.

The restoration project of the park won the FIABCI-Taiwan Real Estate Excellence Award in 2014 and World Gold Winner of FIABCI World Prix d’Excellence Awards in June 2015 under the Environmental Category.

== Geology ==
The park spans over an area of 21 hectares (52 acres), the largest tree-covered area in Nangang District.

== Facilities ==
The park offers facilities for recreational activities, such as educational commentary facilities. It offers free children's games and bicycle rentals on weekends. It features a log cabin, pavilion, observatory, walkways, playground, and slides.

== Transportation ==
The park is accessible by bus from Taipei Nangang Exhibition Center Station or Taipei Zoo Station of Taipei Metro.

== See also ==
- Landfills in Taiwan
- List of parks in Taiwan
