= Zhongpu =

Rural township in Chiayi County, Taiwan

Coordinates: 23.408239°N 120.534346°E

Zhongpu Township 中埔鄉 Jhongpu
- Rural township
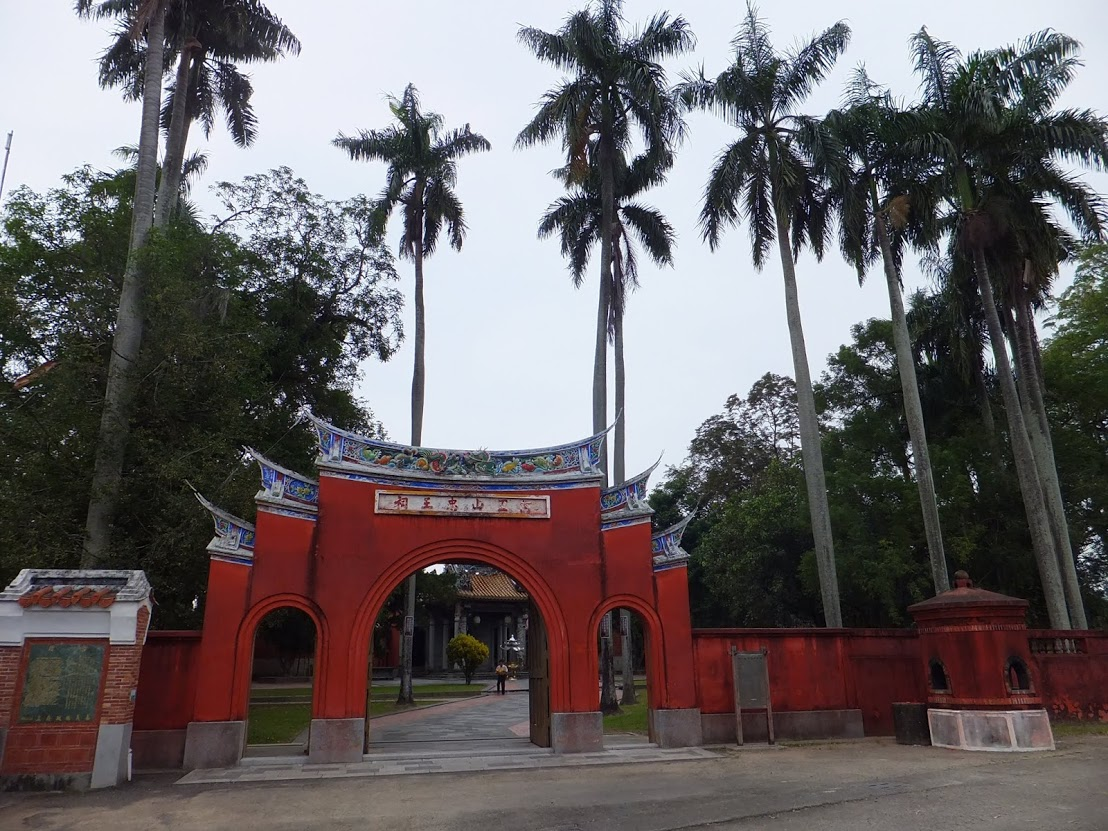

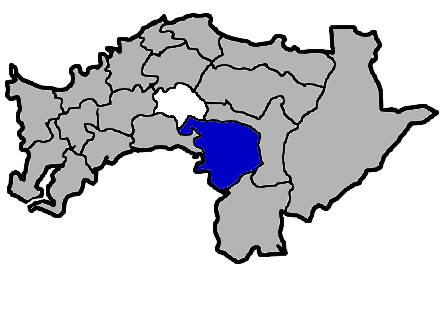
- Zhongpu Township in Chiayi County
- Location: Chiayi County, Taiwan

Area
  - Total: 130 km^{2} (50 sq mi)

Population (May 2022)
  - Total: 43,275
  - Density: 330/km^{2} (860/sq mi)

Zhongpu Township or Jhongpu Township (Chinese: 中埔鄉; pinyin: Zhōngpǔ Xiāng) is a rural township in Chiayi County, Taiwan.

== Geography ==
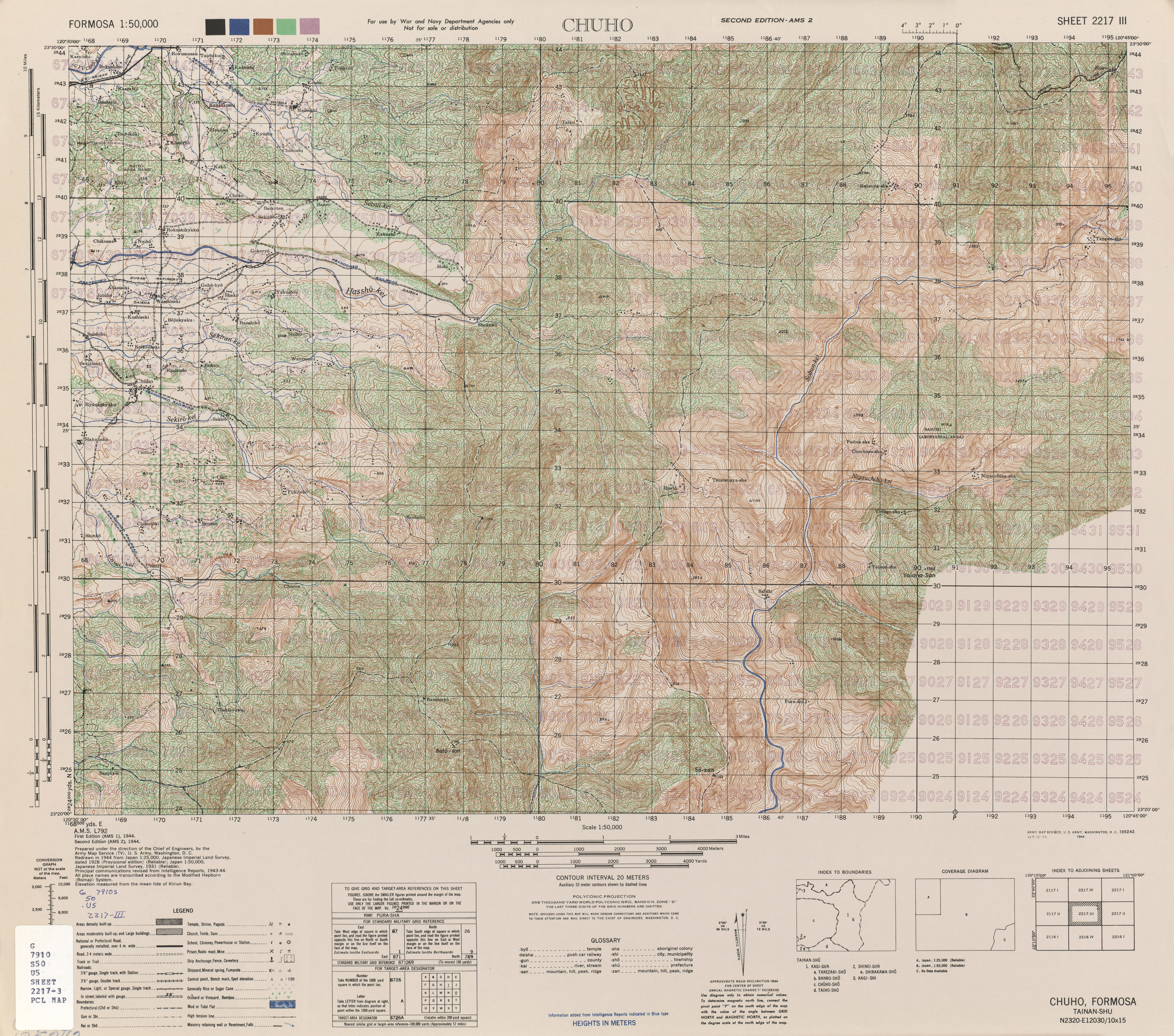
Map of Zhongpu (labeled as Chūho) and surrounding area (1944)

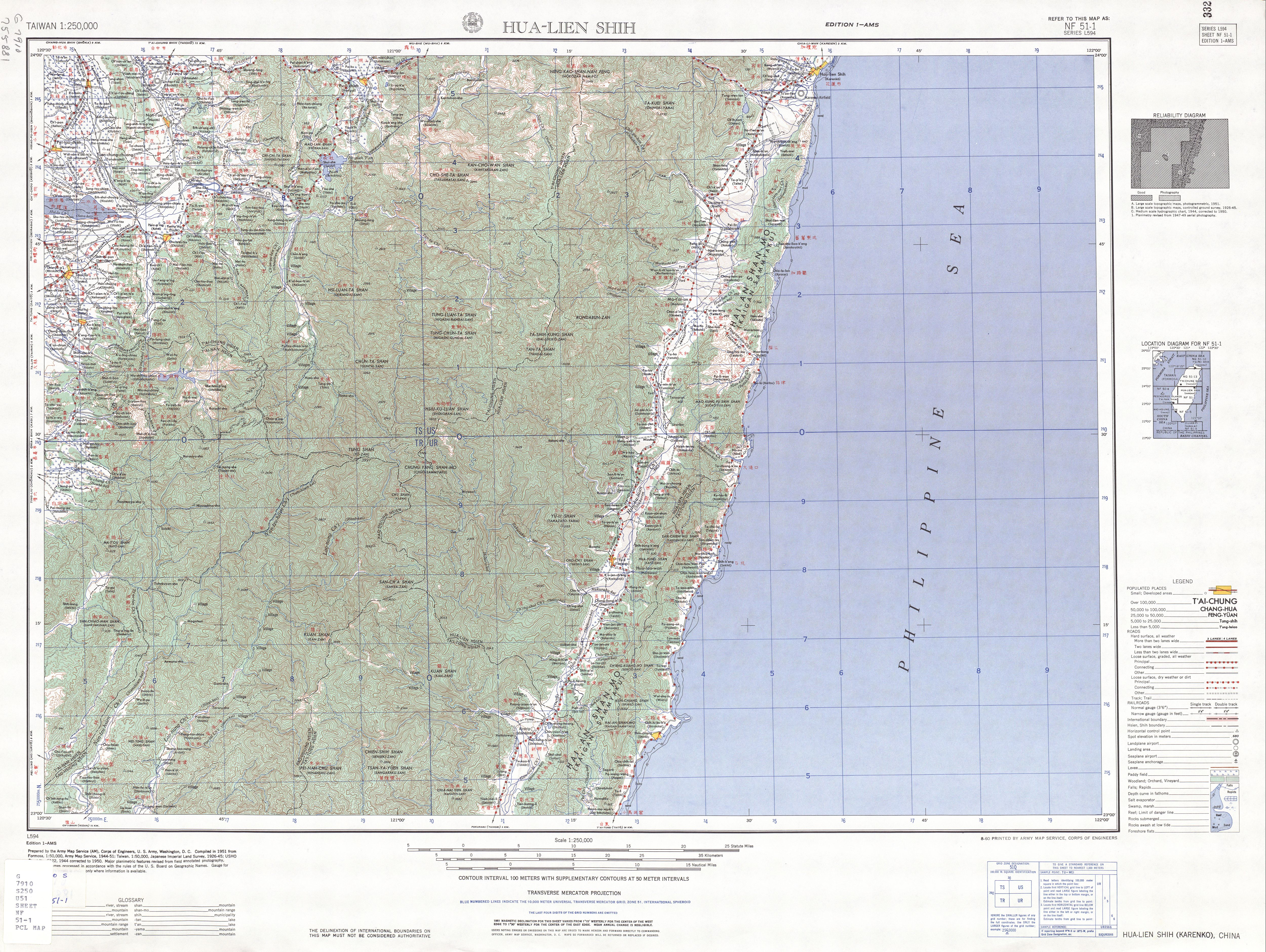
Map of the region including Zhongpu (labeled as Chung-pu (Chūho) 中埔) (1951)

It has a population of 43,275 as of May 2022, and an area of 12,950 hectares (32,000 acres).

== Administrative divisions ==
The township comprises 22 villages: Dingpu, Fushou, Hemei, Hemu, Hexing, Jinlan, Longmen, Longxing, Ruifeng, Sanceng, Shekou, Shenkeng, Shinong, Tongren, Tungxing, Wantan, Yanguan, Yiren, Yumin, Yunshui, Zhonglun and Zhongpu.

== Economy ==
The agriculture sector of the township is one of Chiayi's most important fruit producers, such as growing papayas, pineapples, bananas, tangerines and mushrooms. 7,000 hectares of the township area is cultivated for agricultural purpose, in which the industry employs around 15,000 people, or 32% of the township population.

== Tourist attractions ==
- Wu Feng Park
