= Longpan Park =

Park in Hengchun, Pingtung County, Taiwan

- 龍磐公園
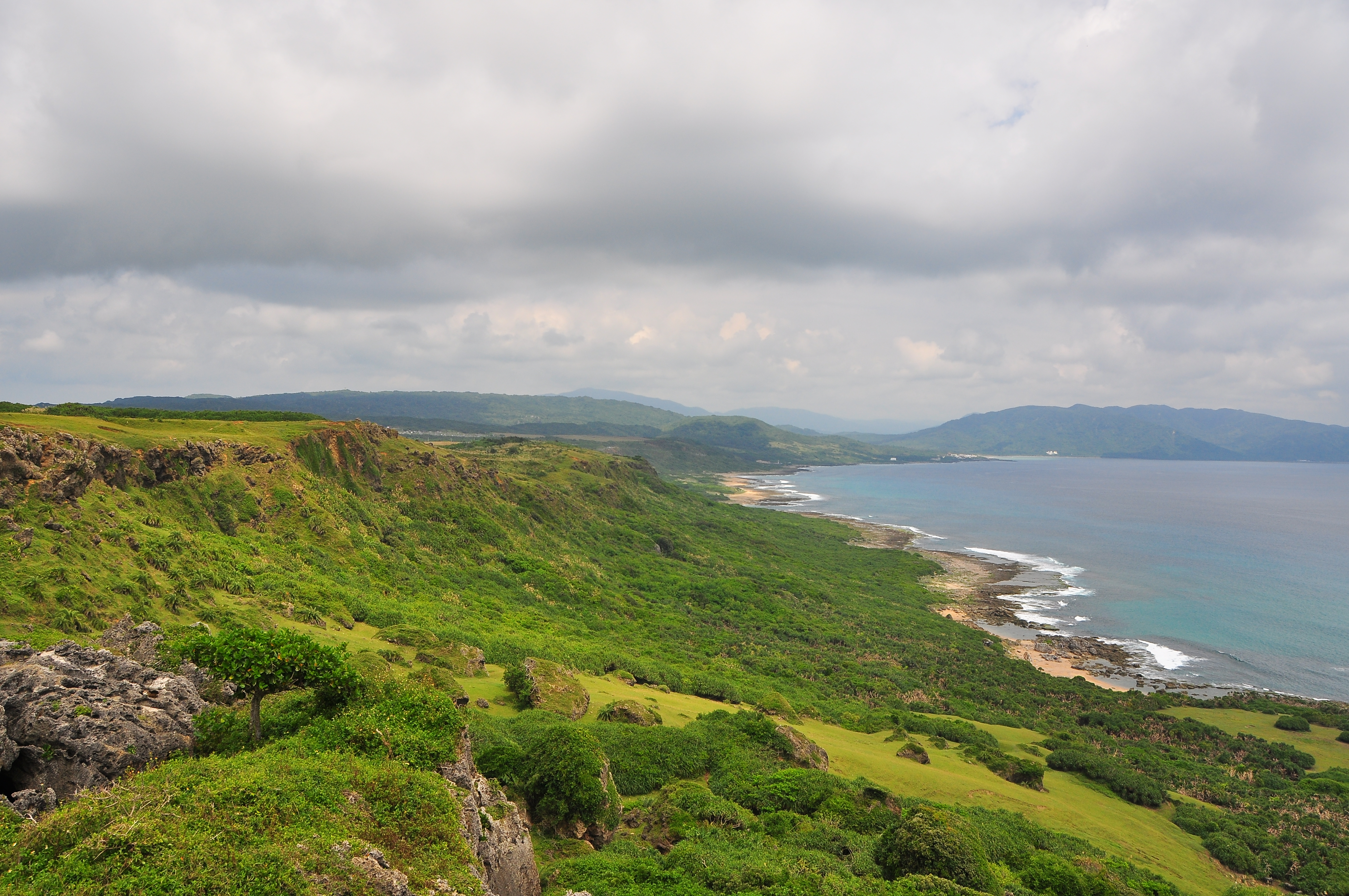
- Interactive map of Longpan Park
- Type: park
- Location: Hengchun, Pingtung County, Taiwan
- Coordinates: 21°55′40.1″N 120°50′58.1″E

The Longpan Park (traditional Chinese: 龍磐公園; simplified Chinese: 龙磐公园; pinyin: Lóngpán Gōngyuán) is a park in Kenting National Park, Hengchun Township, Pingtung County, Taiwan.

== Geology ==
The park faces east to the Pacific Ocean. The park is an open grassland which strong wind often passes by. On the western side lies terrace and coral reef cliffs, on the north lies low hills, on the south lies coral reef terraces and reef coasts and on the east lies isolated mountains, reefs, cliffs, caves, sands, lakes and river delta.

== See also ==
- List of parks in Taiwan
