= Shaochuantou Park =

Park in Gushan, Kaohsiung, Taiwan

- 哨船頭公園
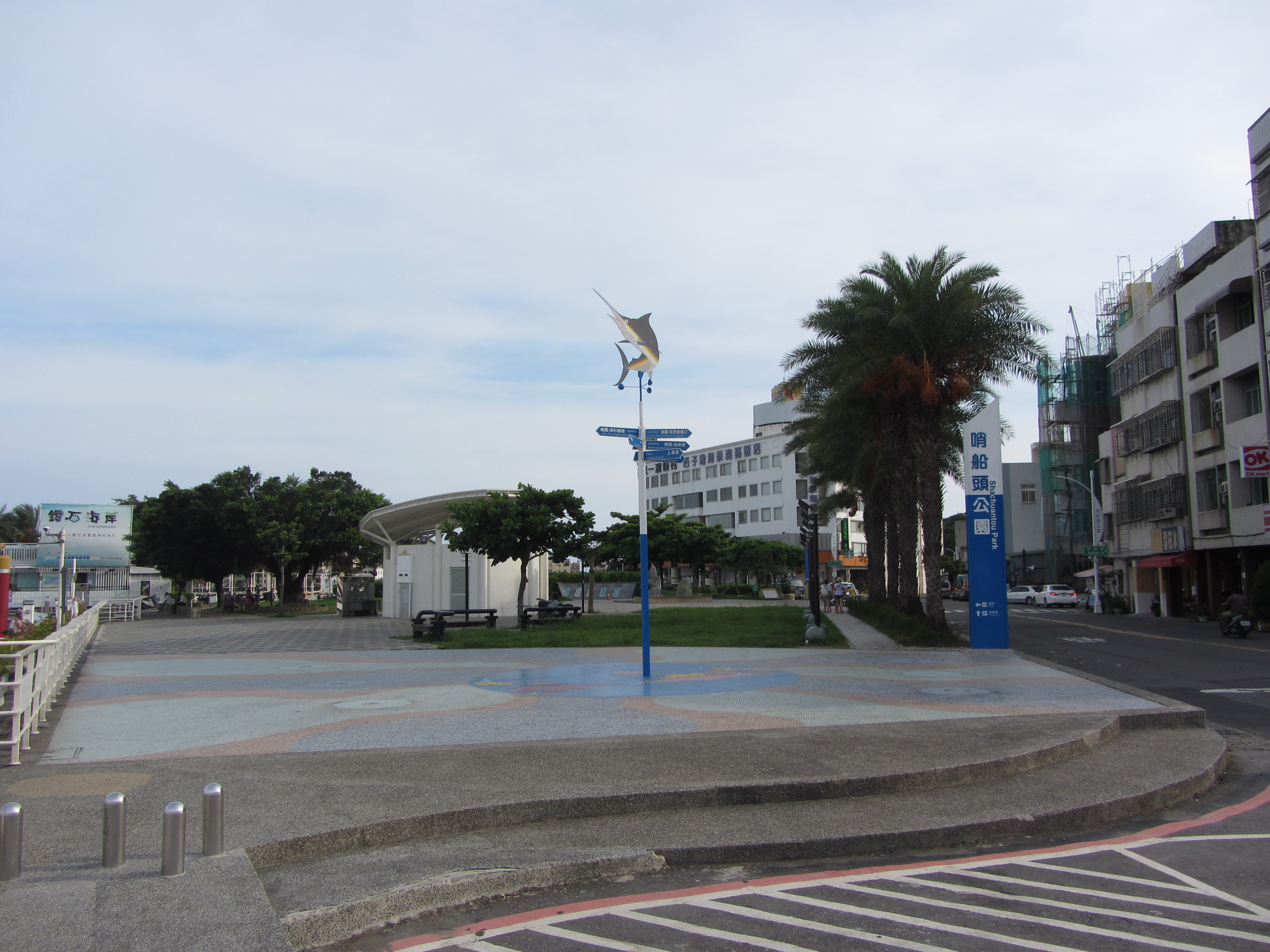
- Interactive map of Shaochuantou Park
- Type: park
- Location: Gushan, Kaohsiung, Taiwan
- Coordinates: 22°37′06.4″N 120°16′08.8″E
- Public transit: Sizihwan Station

The Shaochuantou Park (traditional Chinese: 哨船頭公園; simplified Chinese: 哨船头公园; pinyin: Shàochuántóu Gōngyuán) is a park in Gushan District, Kaohsiung, Taiwan.

== Transportation ==
The park is accessible within walking distance west from Sizihwan Station of Kaohsiung MRT.

== See also ==
- List of parks in Taiwan
