= Erlun Story House =

Cultural center in Erlun, Yunlin, Taiwan

- 二崙故事館
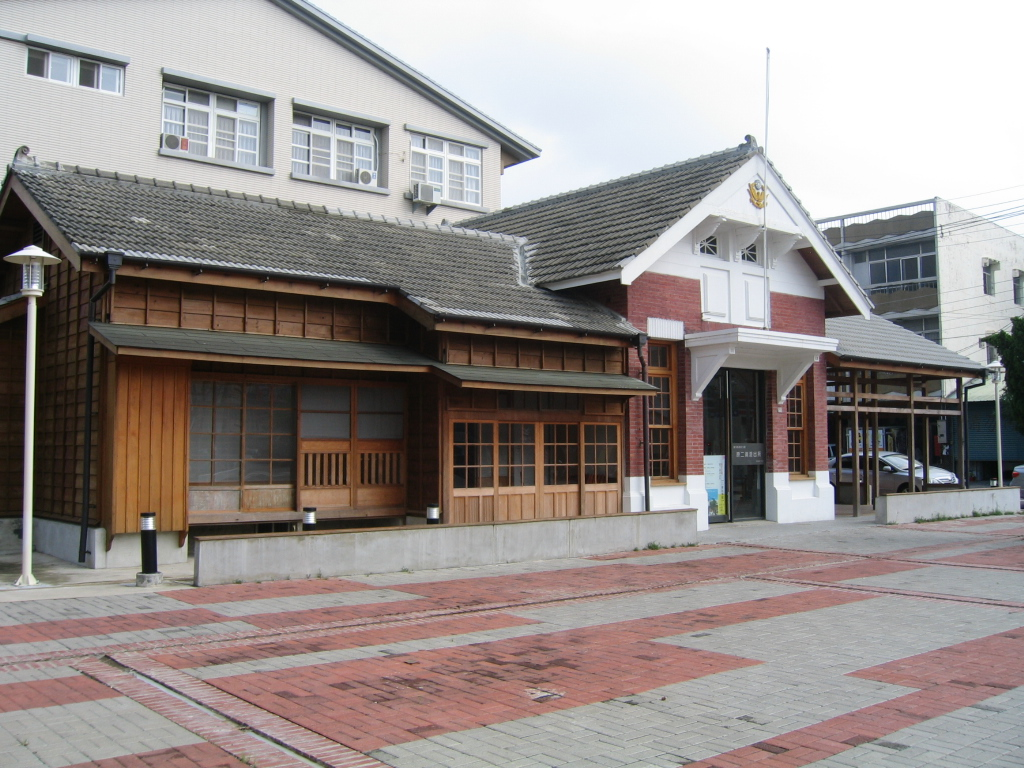
- Interactive map of the Erlun Story House area

General information
- Type: cultural center
- Location: Erlun, Yunlin County, Taiwan
- Coordinates: 23°46′13.6″N 120°24′47.6″E
- Opened: 2014

The Erlun Story House (traditional Chinese: 二崙故事館; simplified Chinese: 二仑故事馆; pinyin: Èrlún Gùshì Guǎn) is a historic building in Erlun Township, Yunlin County, Taiwan.

== History ==
The story house building was originally constructed as the Erlun Police Station in 1899 during the Japanese rule of Taiwan as the first police station in Yunlin, then part of Tainan Prefecture. In 2005, the building was designated as a historical building by Yunlin County Government. It was then reopened as Erlun Story House in 2014 after NT$8.45 million renovation.

== See also ==
- List of museums in Taiwan
