= Fudekeng Environmental Restoration Park =

Park in Wenshan, Taipei, Taiwan

- 福德坑環保復育公園
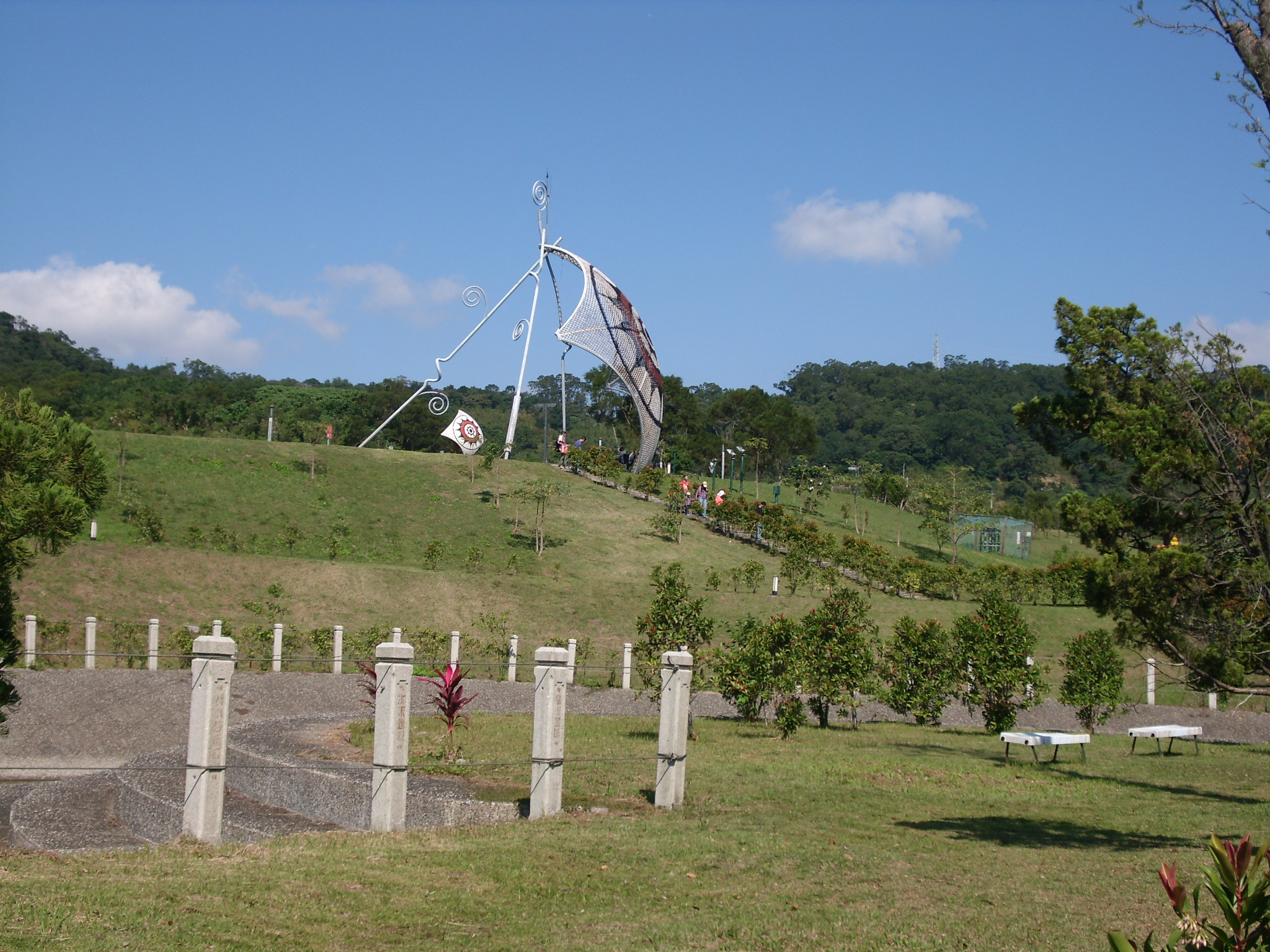
- Interactive map of Fudekeng Environmental Restoration Park
- Type: park
- Location: Wenshan, Taipei, Taiwan
- Coordinates: 25°00′35.2″N 121°35′29.2″E
- Area: 37 hectares (91 acres)
- Established: 2003

Fudekeng Environmental Restoration Park (traditional Chinese: 福德坑環保復育公園; simplified Chinese: 福德坑环保复育公园; pinyin: Fúdékēng Huánbǎo Fùyù Gōngyuán) is a park in Wenshan District, Taipei, Taiwan. The park houses the first photovoltaic power station in Taipei and the first one to be built at a former landfill site.

== History ==
The park used to be a landfill with an area of 3 hectares (7.4 acres). In 2003, after restoration work, it was transformed into a park. On 23 April 2011, the "Returning a Clean Formosa to Our Future Generations activities" was held at the park which was organized by China Airlines with Taipei City Government and Taiwan Himalayan Nature Civilization Conservation Society. The event was attended by President Ma Ying-jeou, Taipei Mayor Hau Lung-pin and Speaker Wang Jin-pyng.

On 30 July 2016, the Department of Environmental Protection of Taipei City Government signed an agreement with Tatung Company to build a photovoltaic power station at the park over an area of 37 hectares (91 acres) using ground-mounted solar panels. The event was attended by Taipei Mayor Ko Wen-je. Construction began in September 2016 and completed within three months. A large area of the park, including the entire grass skiing area, was sacrificed for this. The plant started to generate electricity on 10 January 2017. On 17 February 2017, a ceremony to launch the photovoltaic power station was held at the park which was officially named Taipei Energy Hill.

== Facilities ==
The park features pavilions and wooden walkways. The power station installed at the park is capable of generating 2 GWh of electricity annually and consists of 8,000 solar panels covering an area of 3 hectares (7.4 acres). The generated electricity would then be sold to Taiwan Power Company by feed-in tariff, 10% of which is to be paid to the city government as a rental fee. The power station is managed and operated by Tatung Company. The park will be developed further in the future to include other facilities for entertainment, education and recreation.

== See also ==
- List of parks in Taiwan
- Solar power in Taiwan
