= Erlun Sports Park =

Park in Erlun, Yunlin, Taiwan

- 二崙運動公園
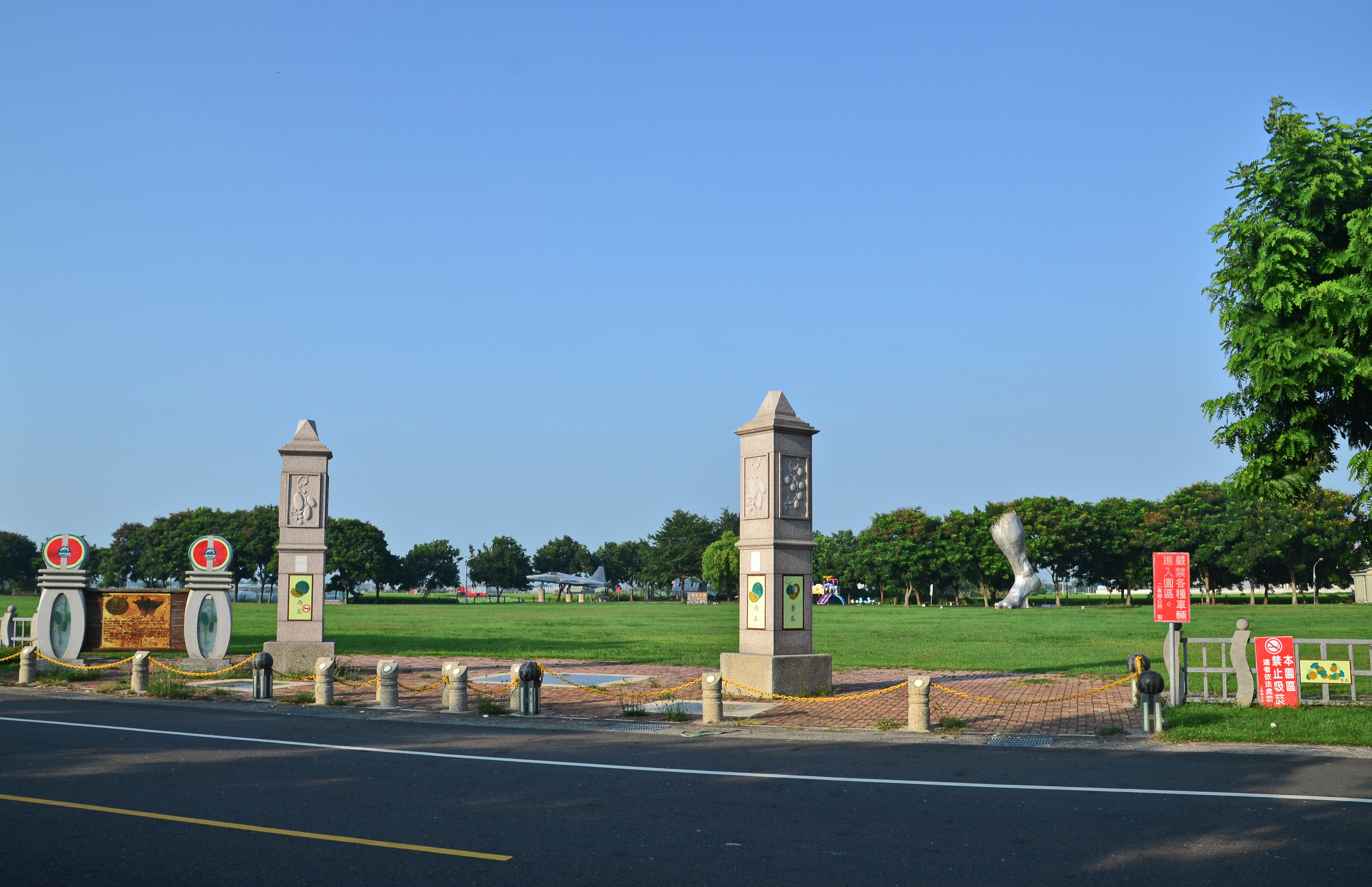
- Interactive map of Erlun Sports Park
- Type: park
- Location: Erlun, Yunlin, Taiwan
- Coordinates: 23°46′30.65″N 120°24′23.33″E

The Erlun Sports Park (traditional Chinese: 二崙運動公園; simplified Chinese: 二仑运动公园; pinyin: Èrlún Yùndòng Gōngyuán) is a park in Erlun Township, Yunlin County, Taiwan.

== See also ==
- List of parks in Taiwan
