= Erlun =

Rural township in Yunlin, Taiwan

Coordinates: 23.791°N 120.395367°E

Erlun Township 二崙鄉
- Rural township
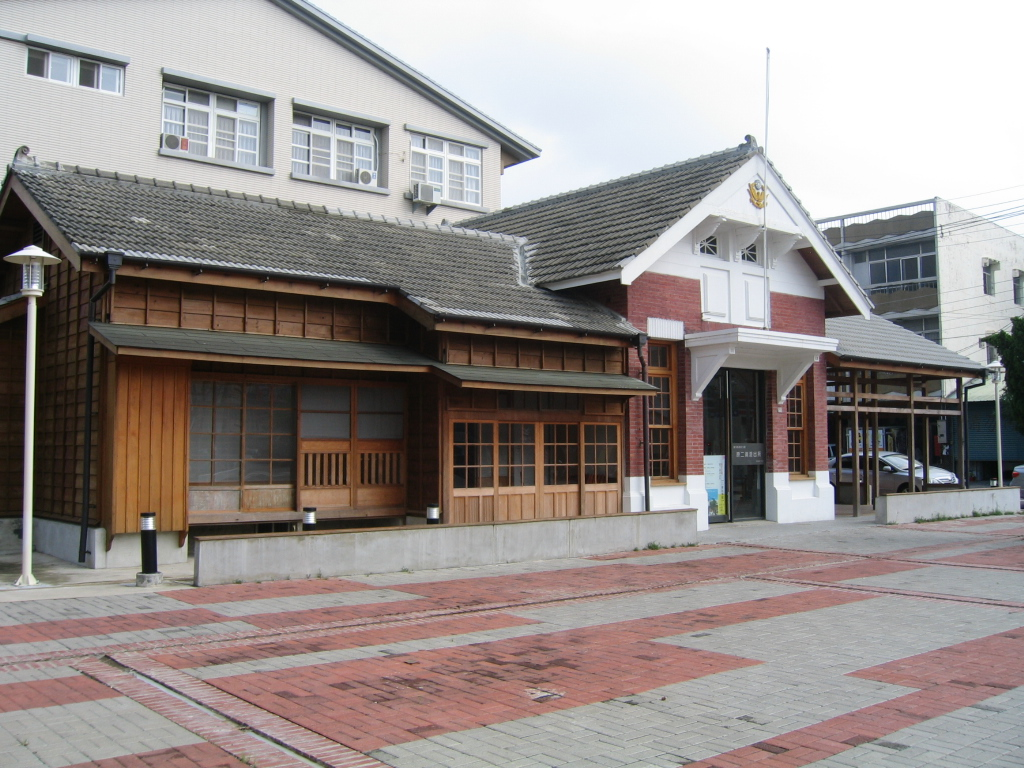
- Erlun Story House, formerly the Erlun Police Station

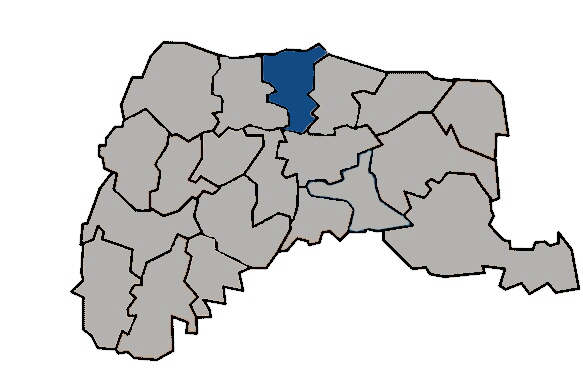
- Erlun Township in Yunlin County
- Location: Yunlin County, Taiwan

Area
  - Total: 60 km^{2} (23 sq mi)

Population (February 2023)
  - Total: 25,183
  - Density: 420/km^{2} (1,100/sq mi)
- Website: www.ehlg.gov.tw/index.aspx (in Chinese)

Erlun Township
- Chinese: 二崙鄉
- Hanyu Pinyin: Èrlún Xiāng
- Wade–Giles: Êrh^{4}-lun^{2} Hsiang^{1}
- Pha̍k-fa-sṳ: Ngi-lûn-hiông
- Hokkien POJ: Jī-lūn-hiong

Erlun Township is a rural township in Yunlin County, Taiwan. It has a population total of 25,183 (as of February 2023) and an area of 59.5625 square kilometres.

== Name ==
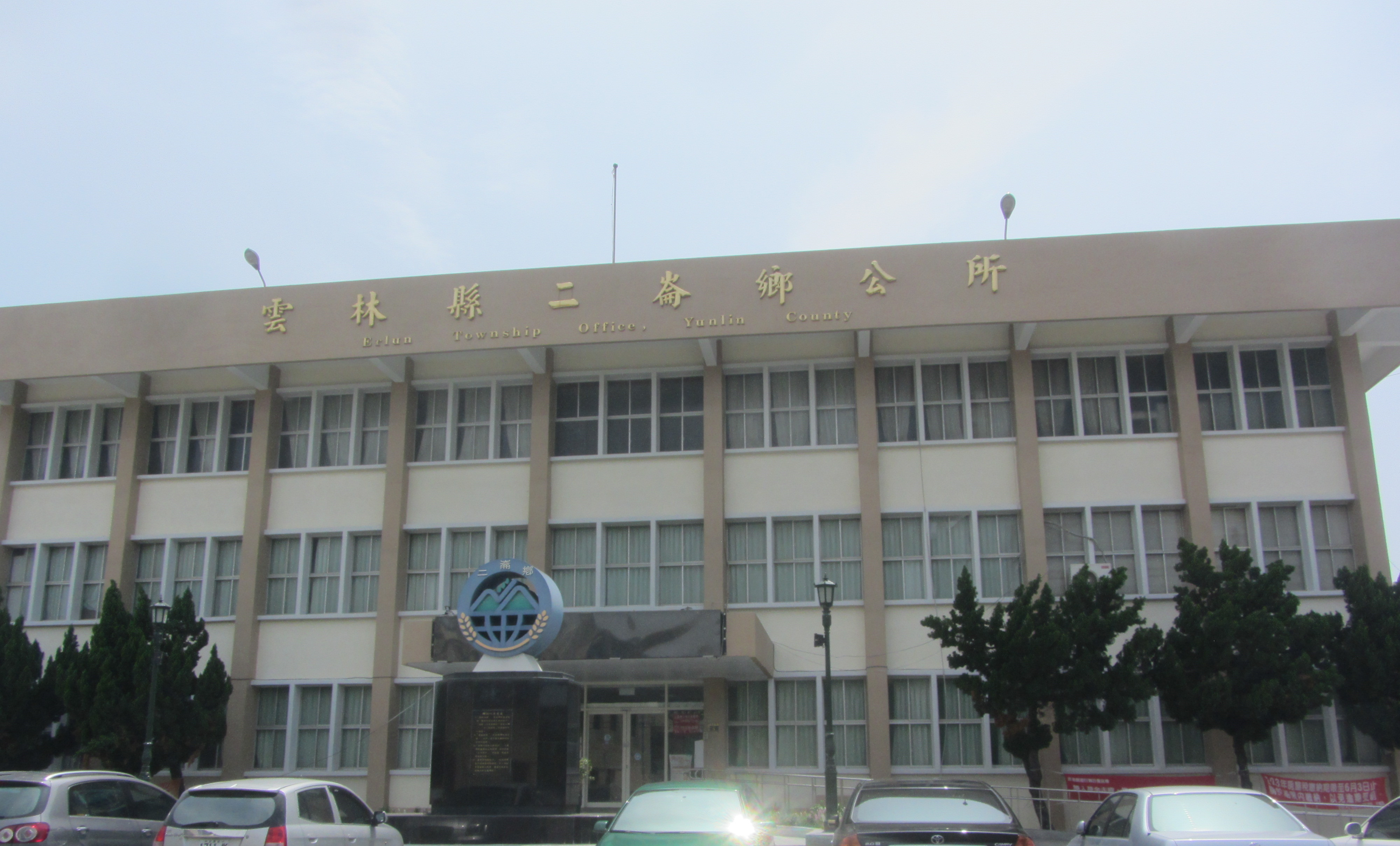
Erlun Township Office

The name Erlun came from the fact that the area consists of two connected hills.

== History ==
Early residents of Erlun came from Jinjiang and Zhao'an in Fujian, China.

== Geography ==
=== Administrative divisions ===
The township comprises 18 villages: Dahua (大華), Datong (大同), Dayi (大義), Dazhuang (大庄), Dingan (定安), Fuxing (復興), Ganghou (港後), Laihui (來惠), Lundong (崙東), Lunxi (崙西), Nanzi (湳仔), Sanhe (三和), Tianwei (田尾), Yangxian (楊賢), Yizhuang (義庄), Yongding (永定), Youche (油車) and Zhuangxi (庄西).

== Tourist attractions ==
- Erlun Sports Park
- Erlun Story House
