= Chengmei Riverside Park =

Park in Taipei, Taiwan

- 成美河濱公園
- Interactive map of Chengmei Riverside Park
- Type: urban park
- Location: Taipei, Taiwan
- Coordinates: 25°04′03.6″N 121°34′10.9″E
- Area: 12.1 hectares (30 acres)

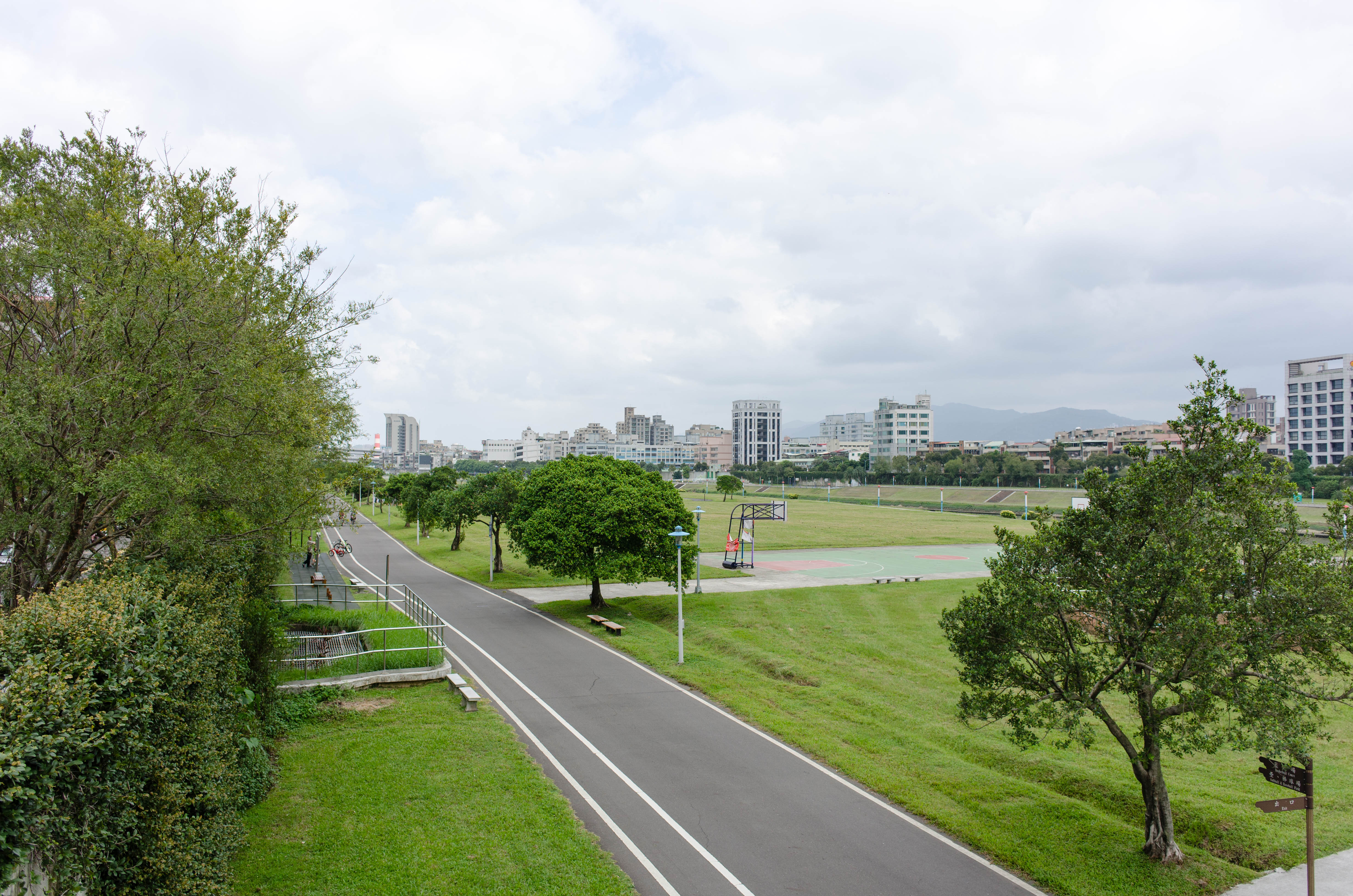
Chengmei Riverside Park northern side

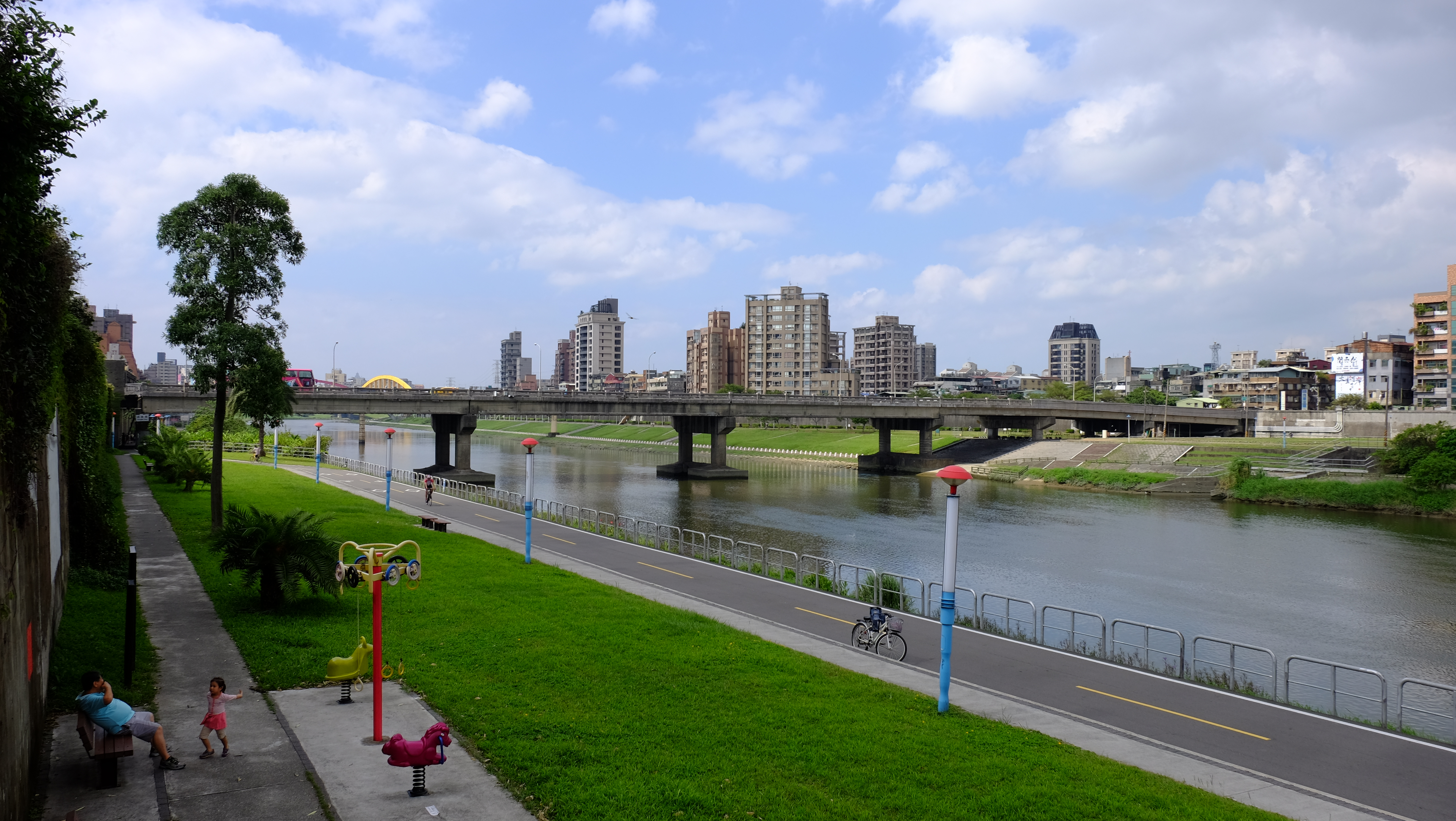
Chengmei Riverside Park southern side

The Chengmei Riverside Park (traditional Chinese: 成美河濱公園; simplified Chinese: 成美河滨公园; pinyin: Chéngměi Hébīn Gōngyuán) is a park along the Keelung River in Taipei, Taiwan.

== Geology ==
The park is divided into two parts by the river, the northern part which is located in Neihu District on the right side of the river bank and the southern part which is located in Nangang District on the left side of the river bank. The park on the right side of the river bank spans over an area of 9.9 hectares and the one on the left side spans over an area of 2.2 hectares.

== Architecture ==
The park features a LOVE public artwork and the I-Love-You and Next Stop: Happiness sign on the other side. The Chengmei Bridge located within the park connects both sides of the park for traffic vehicles and pedestrians.

== Transportation ==
The park is accessible within walking distance north east of Songshan Station of Taipei Metro.

== See also ==
- List of parks in Taiwan
