= Wu Feng Park =

Park in Zhongpu, Chiayi County, Taiwan

- 吳鳳公園
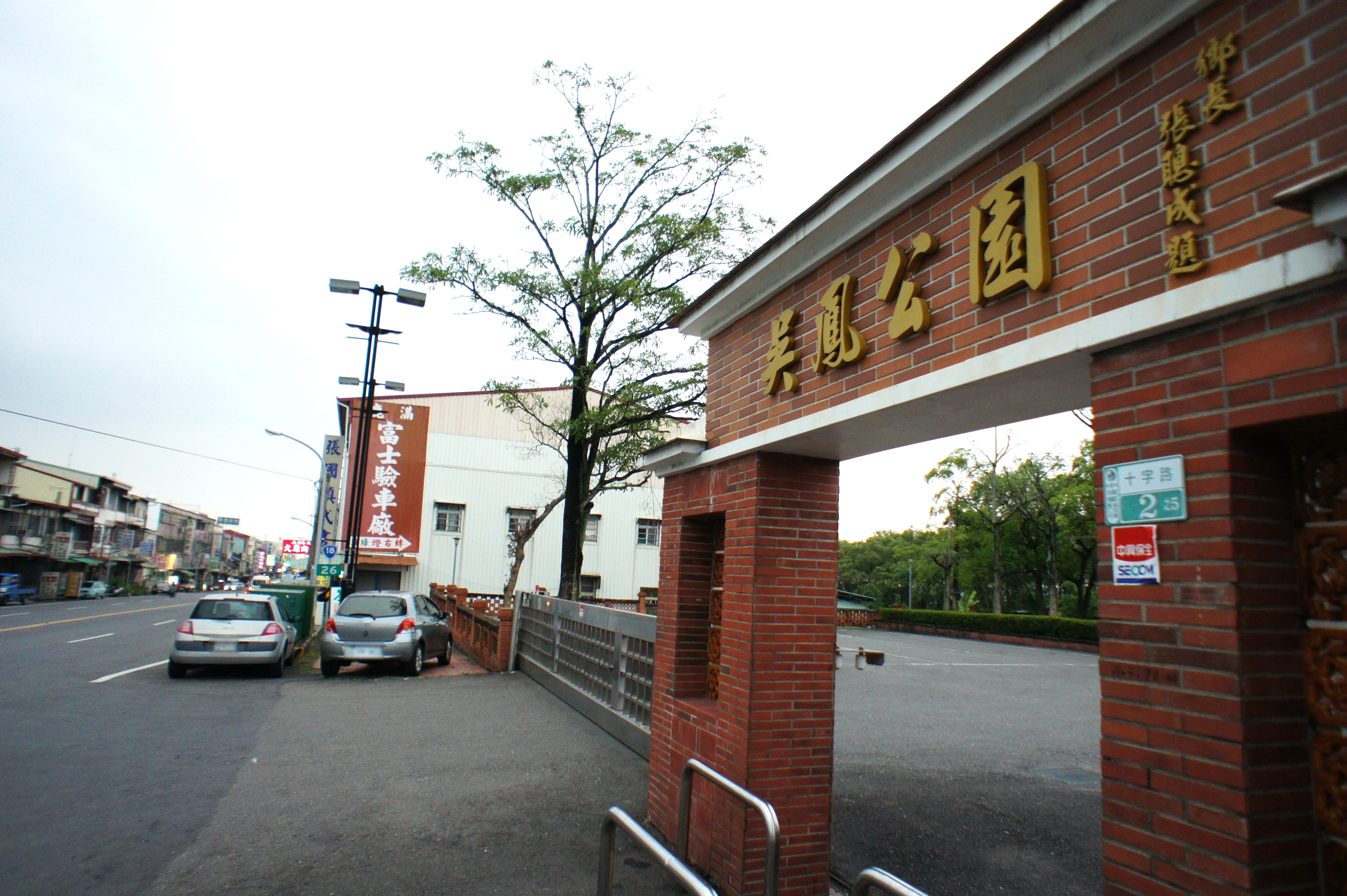
- Interactive map of Wu Feng Park
- Type: urban park
- Location: Zhongpu, Chiayi County, Taiwan
- Coordinates: 23°26′30.8″N 120°31′51.5″E

The Wu Feng Park (traditional Chinese: 吳鳳公園; simplified Chinese: 吴凤公园; pinyin: Wúfèng Gōngyuán) is a park in Zhongpu Township, Chiayi County, Taiwan.

== Name ==
The name of the park is derived from the name of a government official called Wu Feng. He used to resolve disputes between indigenous peoples and the Han Chinese on the lowland, from which he earned respect from both groups.

== Architecture ==
The park has low, red-clay walls which enclose and divide the site with huge character. There are many octagonal, circular and jar-shaped openings, windows and doorways. The central courtyard is devoted to an exhibition that shows Alishan's past, present and proposed future developments. There is also a large display showing off the history and modern crafts of the region's Tsou aboriginal tribe. It houses the headquarters of Alishan National Scenic Area.

== See also ==
- List of parks in Taiwan
