= Landfills in Taiwan =

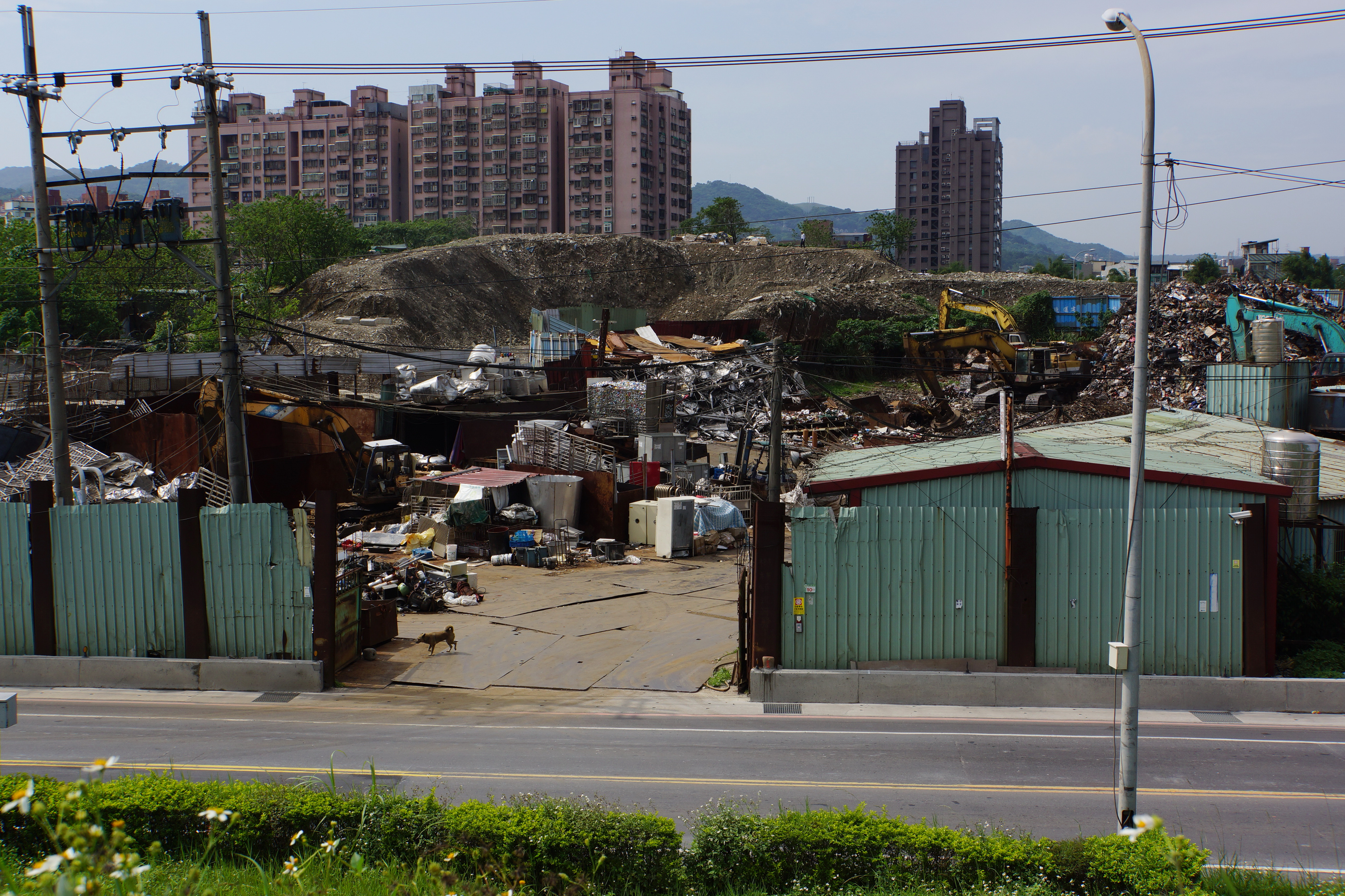
A landfill in New Taipei, Taiwan

In Taiwan, 2% of its municipal solid waste is disposed of by landfill. As of 2013, there are a total of 404 landfills in Taiwan. Public landfills in Taiwan can be divided into sanitary landfill and basic landfill. The former has detailed regulations specifying it to prevent secondary pollution while the latter has none.

== History ==
Taipei's official landfill moved from near Songshan Airport to what became known as Neihu Garbage Mountain in Huzhou, Neihu District, in 1970. This location handled Taipei's waste disposal needs until 1985, when the Fudekeng location became operational. The first sanitary landfill in Taiwan was constructed in 1984.

== Issues ==
Due to the land scarcity in Taiwan, building new landfills is difficult and is often met with opposition from nearby residents. Common problems caused by landfills are increased traffic volume, higher noise level and damage caused by vibration. Companies generally need around two years to construct a new landfill, due to lengthy negotiations with local residents who usually oppose the construction. There are also many illegal landfills in Taiwan which do not meet the minimum standard requirement. In summer 1997, trash were pilling up on the streets of Zhongli City, Taoyuan County for several weeks due to the unavailability of new landfills.

== Landfill restorations ==
Many of the landfills that have reached their capacity have been converted into parks and community centers. The Environmental Protection Administration stated in 2011 that they would excavate old landfills for some materials and energy recovery, as well as adding bio-energy to the incinerator plants around Taiwan.

In mid 2013, the Taipei City Government reopened the restored Shanzuku Landfill as the Shanshuilu Eco Park in Nangang District, Taipei.

On 17 February 2017, Taipei Mayor Ko Wen-je inaugurated Taipei Energy Hill, the first landfill-based photovoltaic power station in Taiwan. The area used to be the site for Fude Landfill until 1994 and has been turned into an environmental park in 2003.

In 2017, AU Optronics won a tender to construct a 3.5 MW photovoltaic power station in a former landfill site at Guanmiao District, Tainan.

== See also ==
- Waste management in Taiwan
