= Taipei Cinema Park =

Park in Taipei, Taiwan

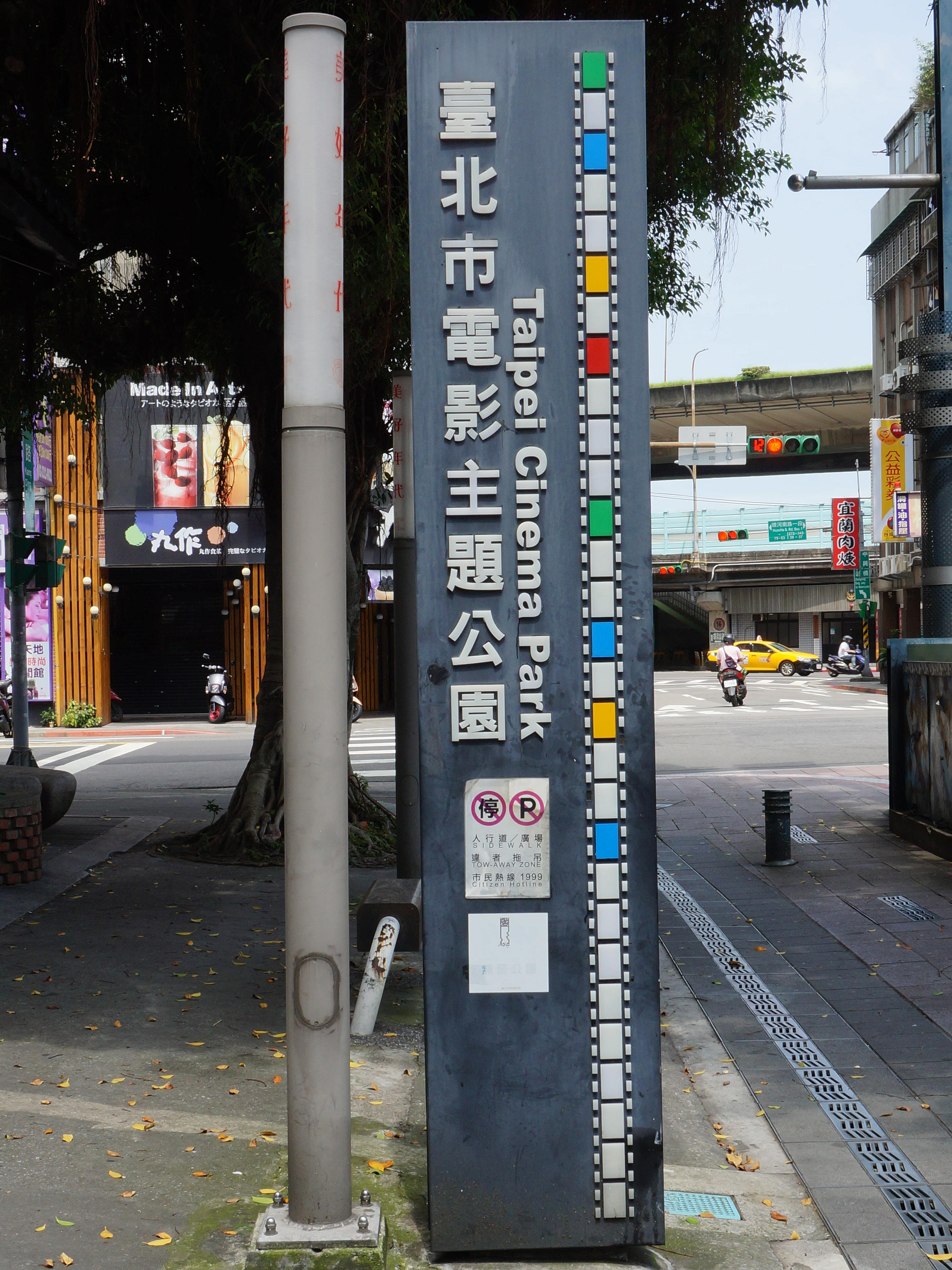
- Sign for the park, 2019
- Location: Taipei, Taiwan

Taipei Cinema Park is a park in Taipei, Taiwan. The park and nearby alleys have graffiti and other murals.

The park has hosted the Taiwan International Queer Film Festival.

== See also ==
- List of parks in Taiwan
