= Stone Sculpture Park, New Taipei =

Park in Banqiao, New Taipei, Taiwan

Stone Sculpture Park
- 石雕公園
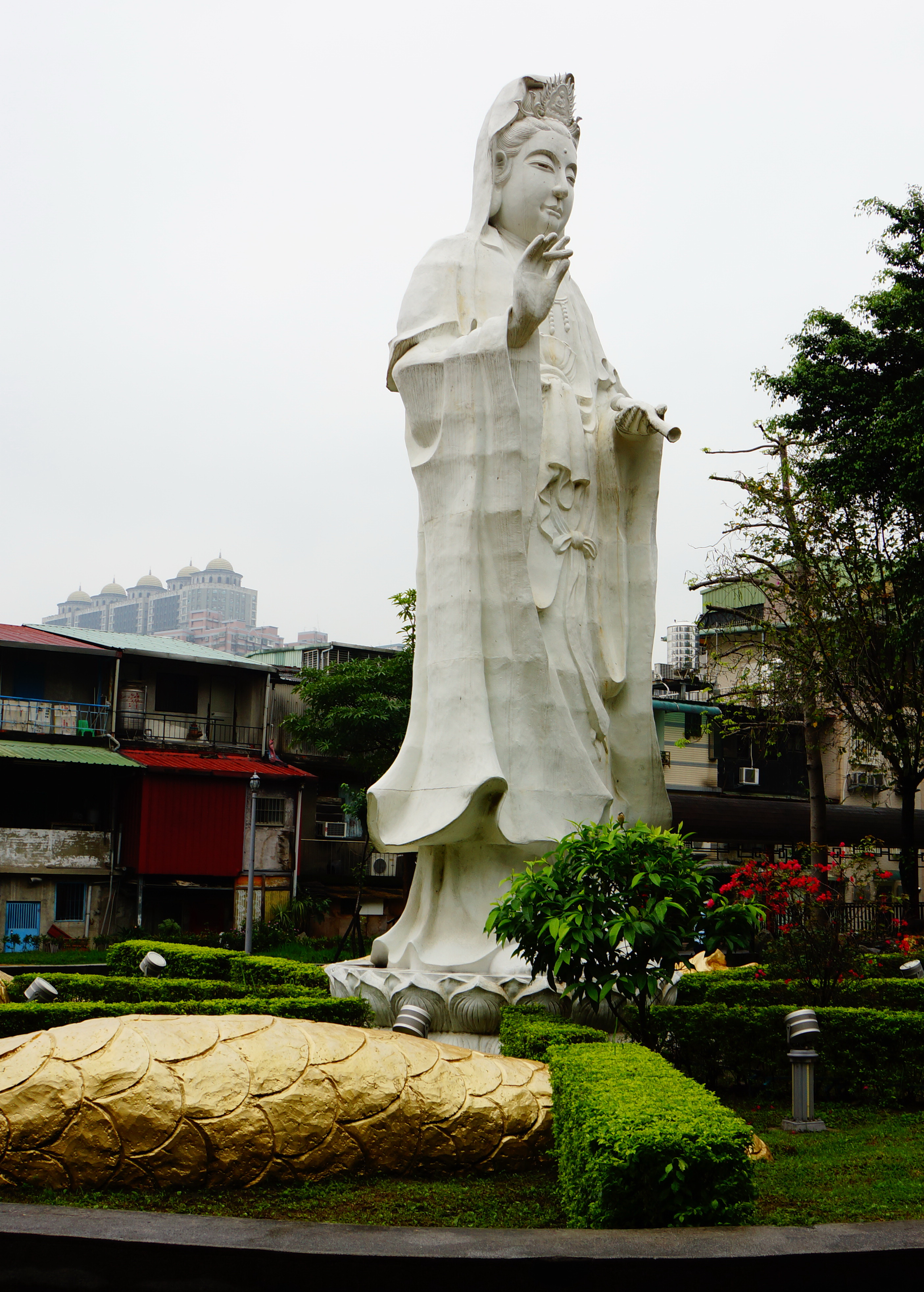
- Interactive map of Stone Sculpture Park
- Type: urban park
- Location: Banqiao, New Taipei, Taiwan
- Coordinates: 25°01′47″N 121°28′11″E
- Public transit: Jiangzicui Station

The Stone Sculpture Park (traditional Chinese: 石雕公園; simplified Chinese: 石雕公园; pinyin: Shídiāo Gōngyuán) is a park in Banqiao District, New Taipei, Taiwan.

== Architecture ==
The park consists of stone landscape area, gazebo, fish pond, statues, totem, etc.

== Transportation ==
The wetland is accessible within walking distance west of Jiangzicui Station of Taipei Metro.

== See also ==
- Geography of Taiwan
