= Sheding Nature Park =

Park in Hengchun, Pingtung County, Taiwan

Sheding Nature Park Chinese: 社頂自然公園
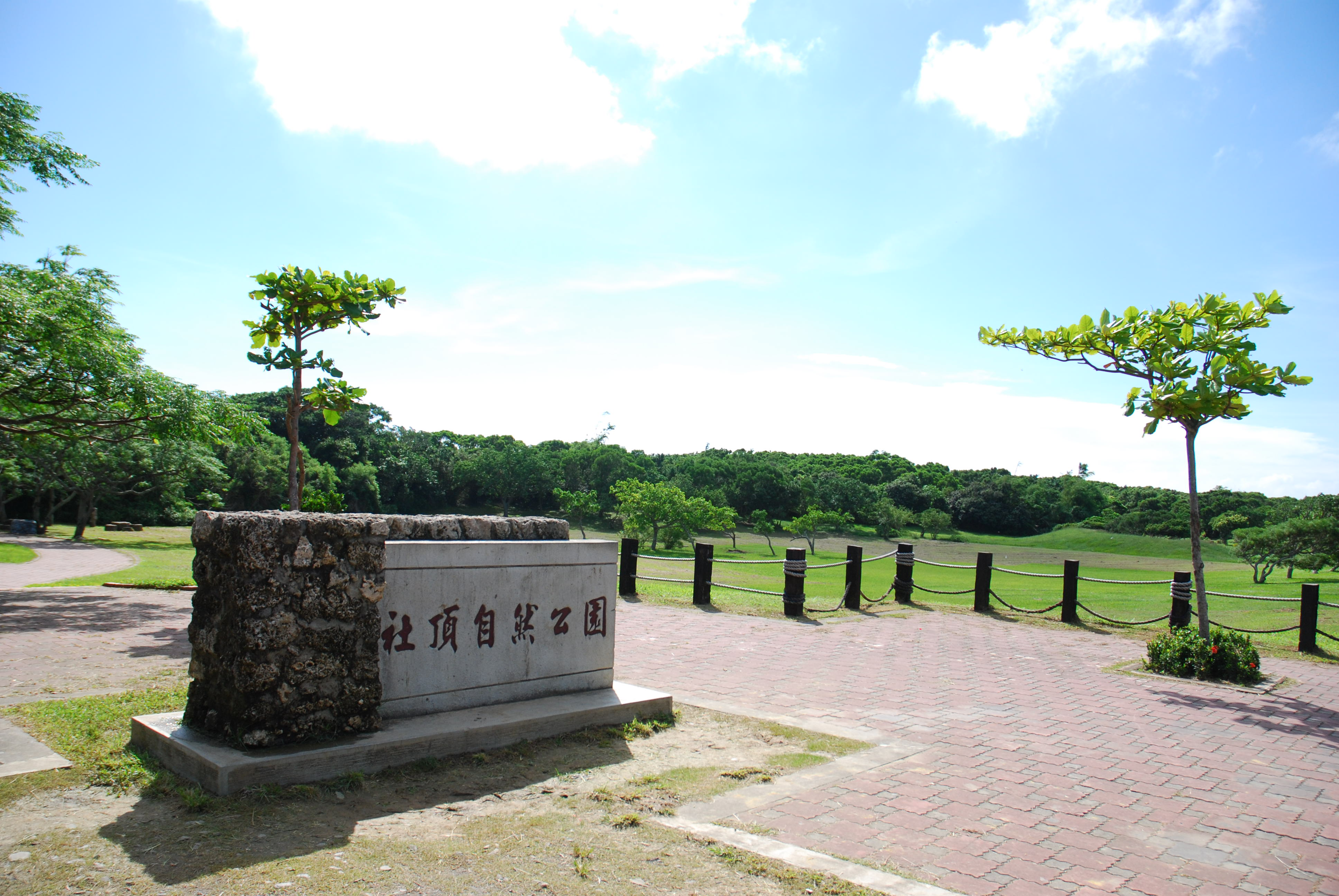

- Location within Pingtung County
- Interactive map of Sheding Nature Park

Geography
- Location: Hengchun, Pingtung County, Taiwan
- Coordinates: 21°57′23.1″N 120°49′08.8″E
- Area: 128.7 ha (318 acres)

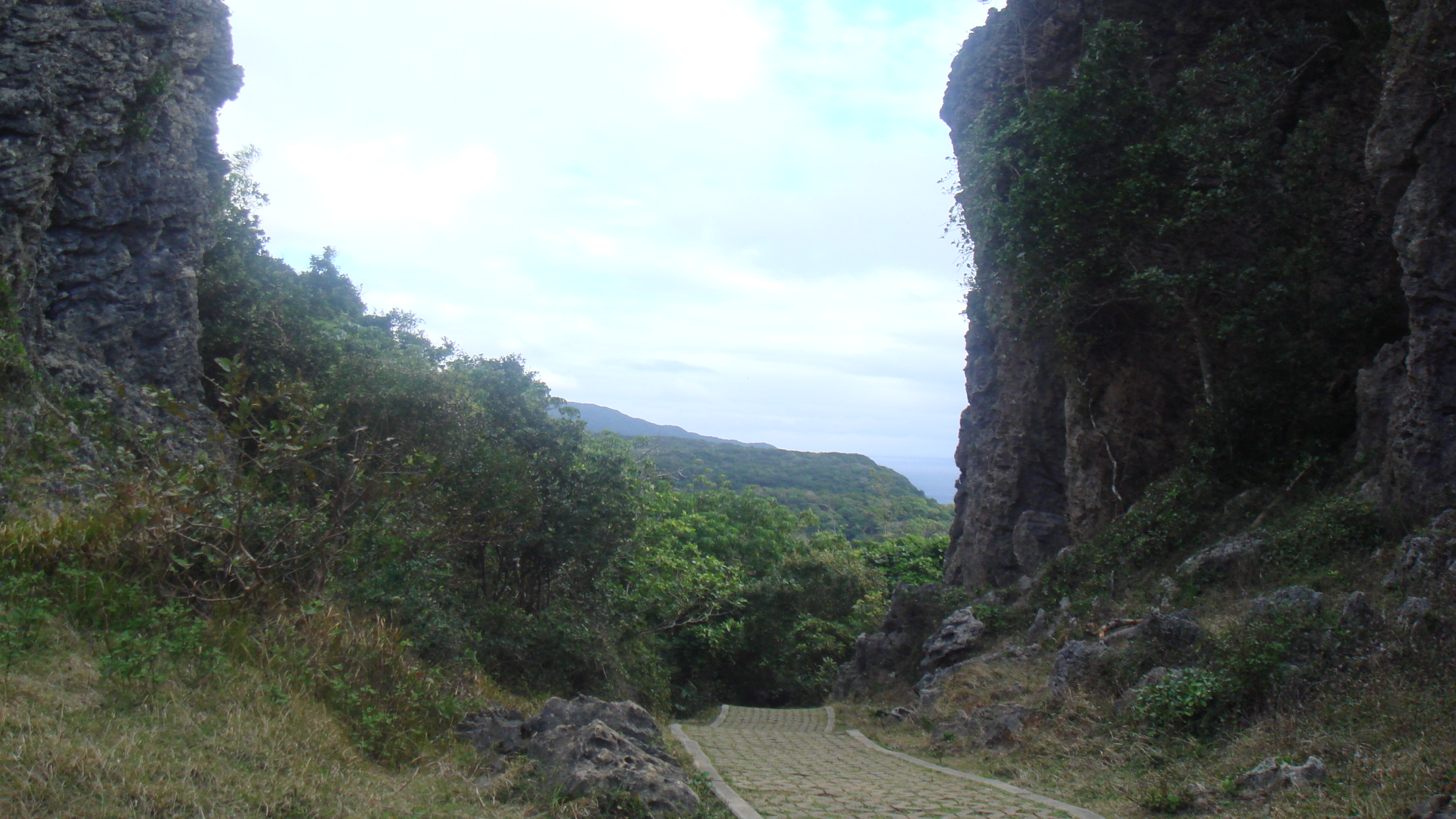
View in Sheding Nature Park

Sheding Nature Park (traditional Chinese: 社頂自然公園; simplified Chinese: 社顶自然公园; pinyin: Shèdǐng Zìrán Gōngyuán) is a nature park within Kenting National Park, in Hengchun Township, Pingtung County, Taiwan.

== History ==
Sheding used to be the settlement area of the Paiwan people. It is currently used as the research center and conservation of wildlifes.

== Geology ==
The park spans over an area of 128.7 hectares. It features rock formations formed from ancient coral reefs and has many limestone caves. It also hosts 329 species of plants and animals. The park also features several hiking trails and viewing platforms.

== See also ==
- Geography of Taiwan
