= Xiangshan Park (Taipei) =

Park in Taipei, Taiwan

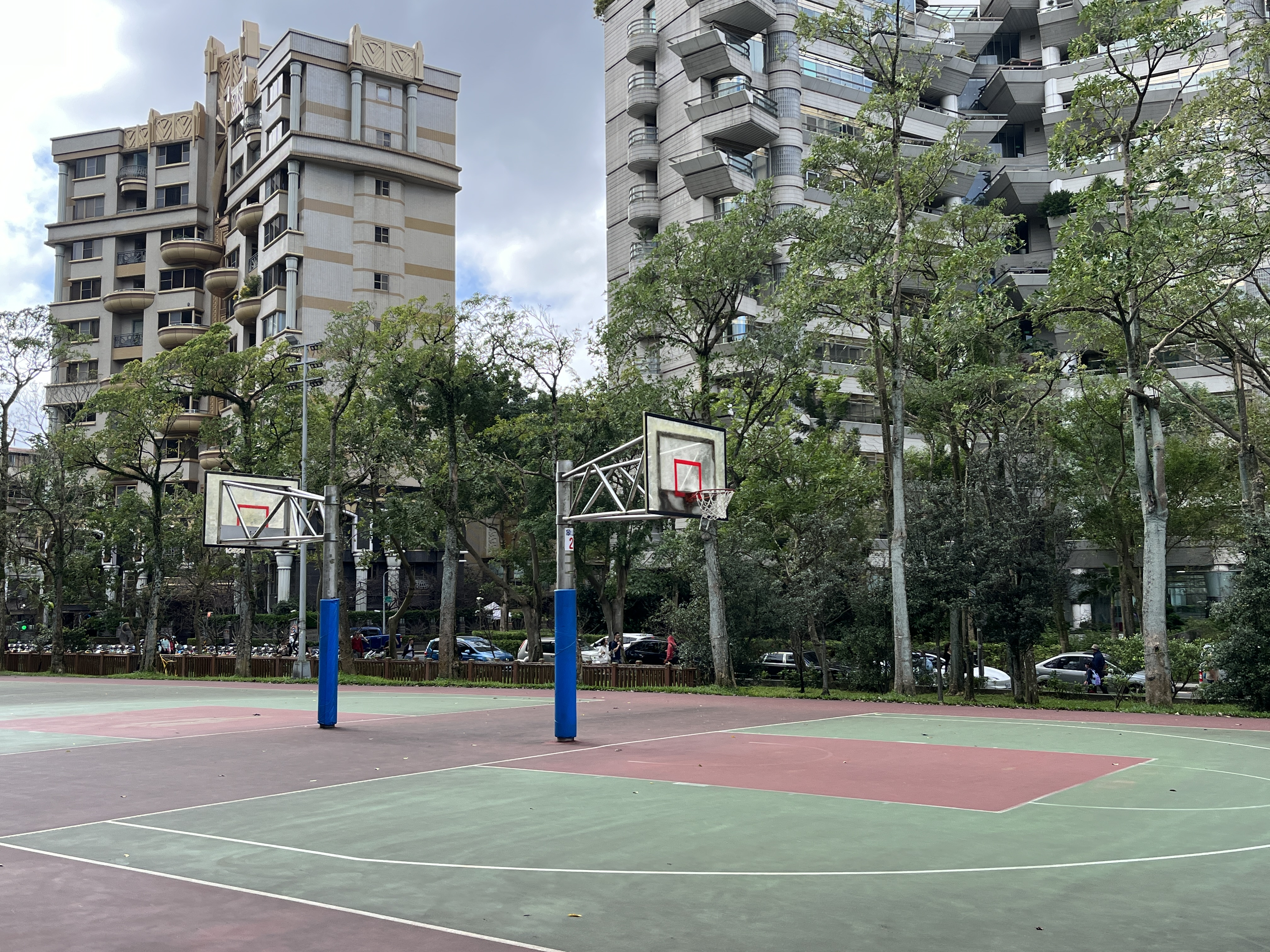
- Basketball courts in the park in 2024
- Interactive map of Xiangshan Park
- Location: Taipei, Taiwan
- Coordinates: 25.0304°N 121.5701°E

Xiangshan Park is a park in Taipei, Taiwan.

== Description ==
The park has views of forests and skyscrapers, and serves as a starting point for the Elephant Mountain trail.
