= Xinzhong Park =

Park in Songshan, Taipei, Taiwan

- 新中公園
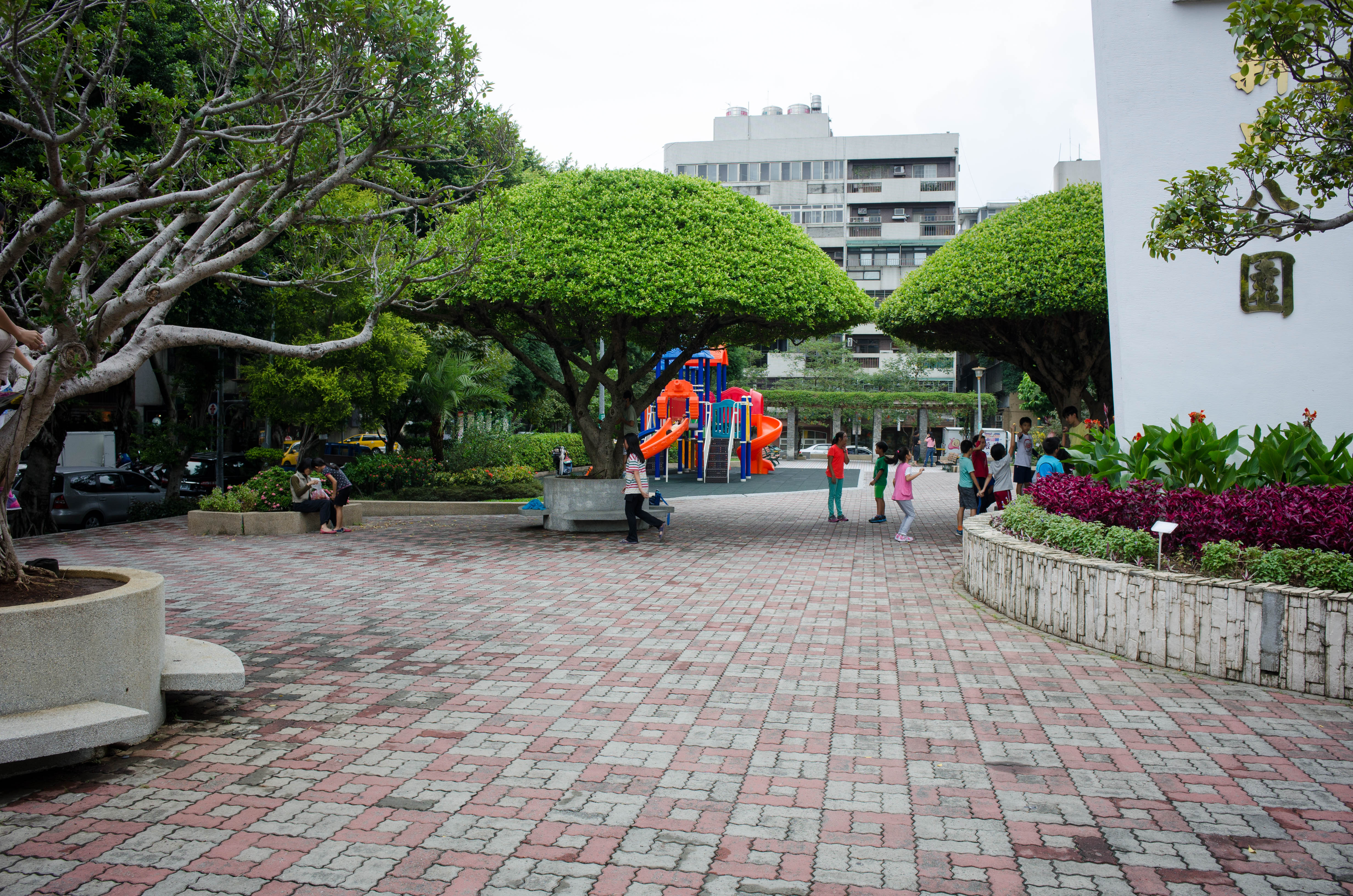
- Interactive map of Xinzhong Park
- Type: park
- Location: Songshan, Taipei, Taiwan
- Coordinates: 25°03′38.1″N 121°33′38.5″E
- Public transit: Songshan Airport Station

The Xinzhong Park (traditional Chinese: 新中公園; simplified Chinese: 新中公园; pinyin: Xīnzhōng Gōngyuán) is a park in Songshan District, Taipei, Taiwan.

== Transportation ==
The park is accessible within walking distance east from Songshan Airport Station of Taipei Metro.

== See also ==
- List of parks in Taiwan
