= Sanmin Park =

Park in Songshan, Taipei, Taiwan

- 三民公園
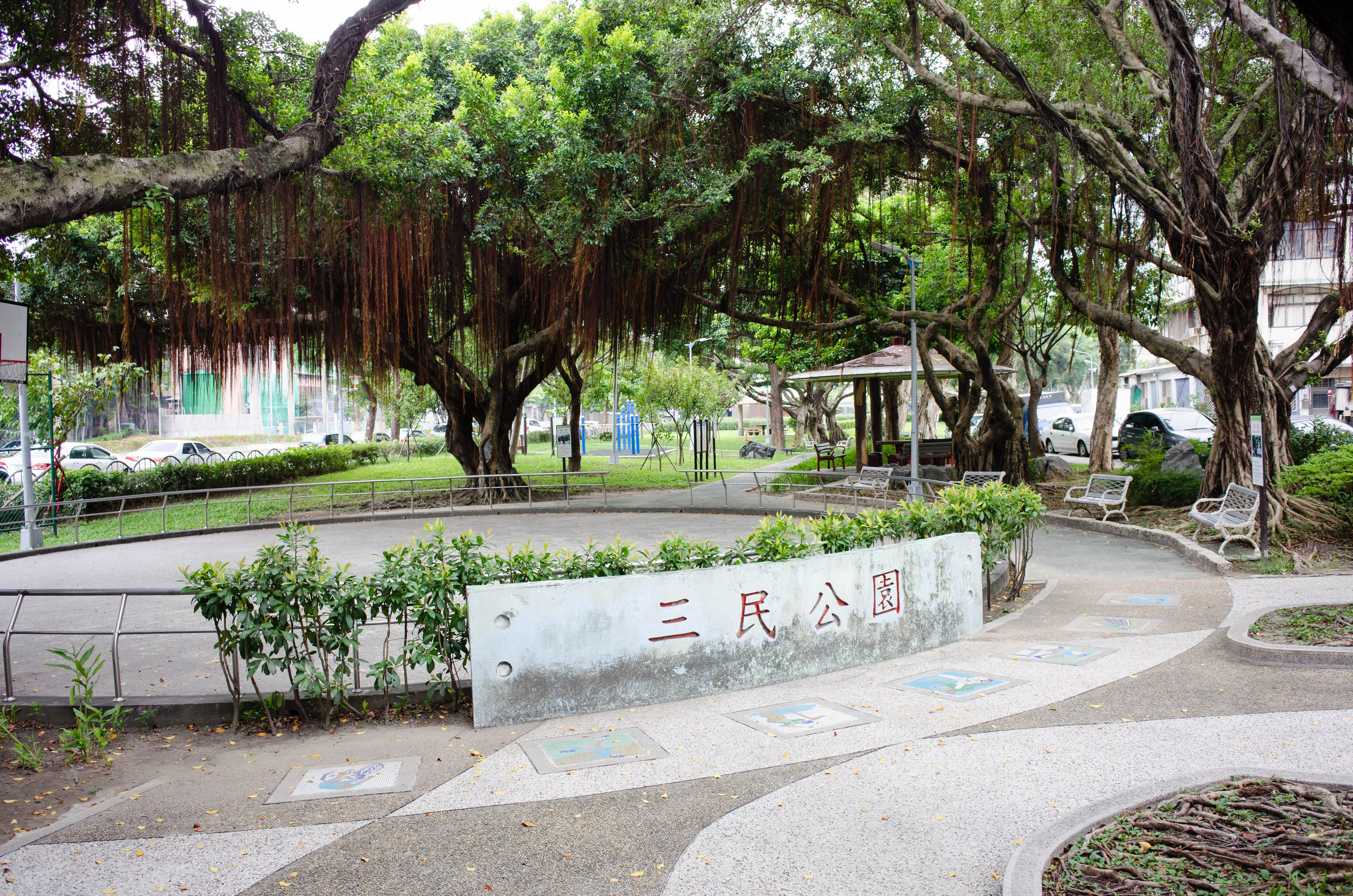
- Interactive map of Sanmin Park
- Type: urban park
- Location: Songshan, Taipei, Taiwan
- Coordinates: 25°03′43.2″N 121°34′04.2″E
- Area: 26,820 m^{2}
- Opened: 1973
- Public transit: Songshan Airport Station

The Sanmin Park (traditional Chinese: 三民公園; simplified Chinese: 三民公园; pinyin: Sānmín Gōngyuán) is a park in Songshan District, Taipei, Taiwan.

== History ==
The park was opened in 1973.

== Architecture ==
The park covers an area of 26,820 m^{2}. The park features children's playground, skating rink, jungle gyms, pavilions, badminton courts and workout trails.

== Transportation ==
The park is accessible east from Songshan Airport Station of Taipei Metro.

== See also ==
- List of parks in Taiwan
