= Taiwan Stock Museum =

Museum in Songshan, Taipei, Taiwan

- 臺灣股票博物館
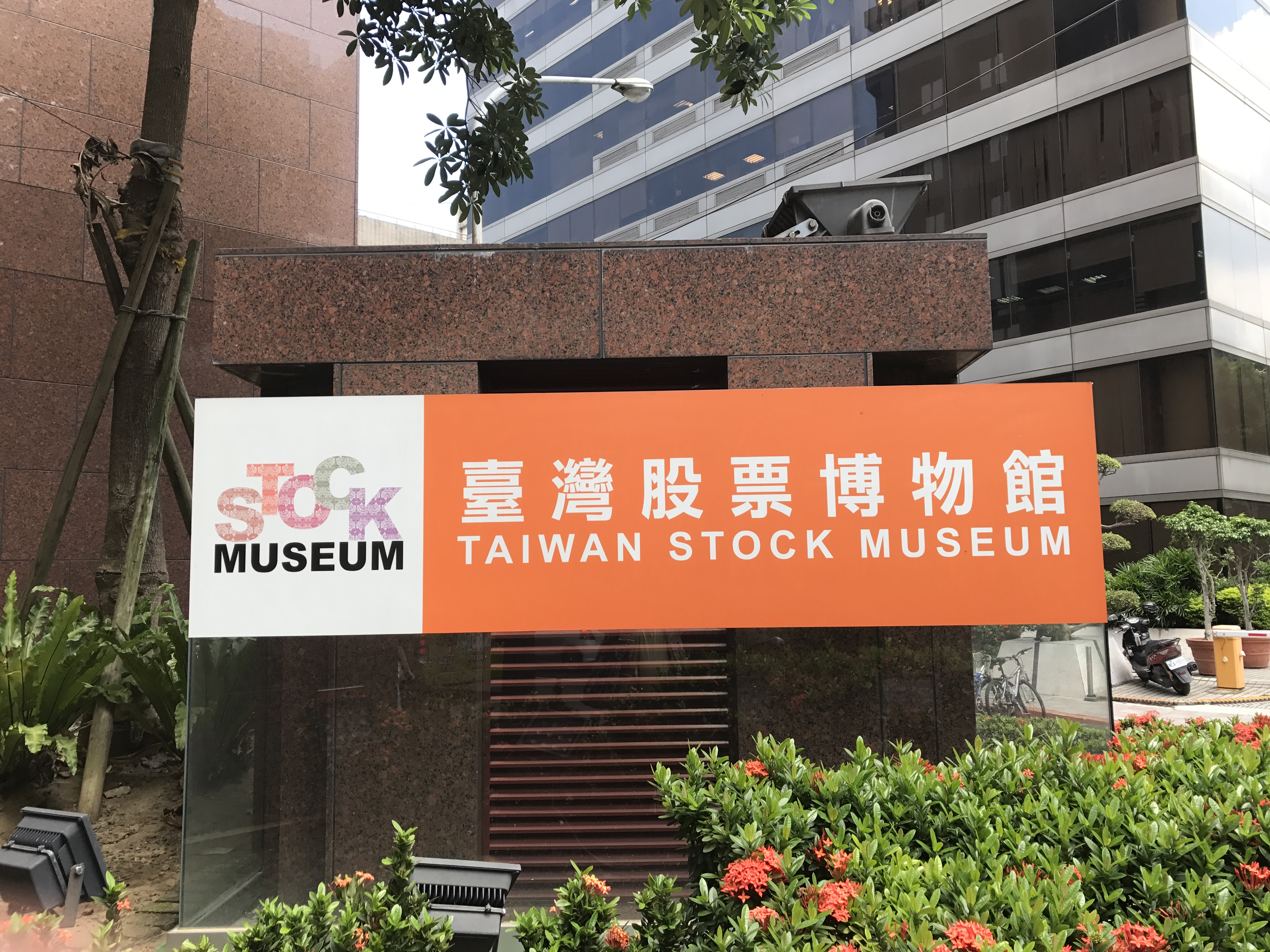
- Established: 24 December 2012
- Location: Songshan, Taipei, Taiwan
- Coordinates: 25°3′39.9″N 121°32′40.2″E
- Type: museum
- Website: Official website

The Taiwan Stock Museum (traditional Chinese: 臺灣股票博物館; simplified Chinese: 台湾股票博物馆; pinyin: Táiwān Gǔpiào Bówùguǎn) is a museum in Songshan District, Taipei, Taiwan.

== History ==
The museum was planned and created by the Taiwan Depository and Clearing Corporation. It was opened on 24 December 2012 in a ceremony officiated by Financial Supervisory Commission Chairperson Ding Kung-wha and Vice Chairperson Wu Tang-chieh.

== Exhibitions ==
The museum hosts an exhibition on the derivation and evolution of shares, the relationship between the development of the Taiwanese stock market and Taiwan's economic progress, and the impact of stock trading on society, among others. It consists of five exhibition areas, notably the Introductory Area, the History Area, the Economic Development Area, the Theater Area and an Assembly Room.

== Transportation ==
The museum is accessible from Zhongshan Junior High School Station of Taipei Metro.

== See also ==
- List of museums in Taiwan
