= Rongxing Garden Park =

Park in Zhongshan, Taipei, Taiwan

- 榮星花園公園
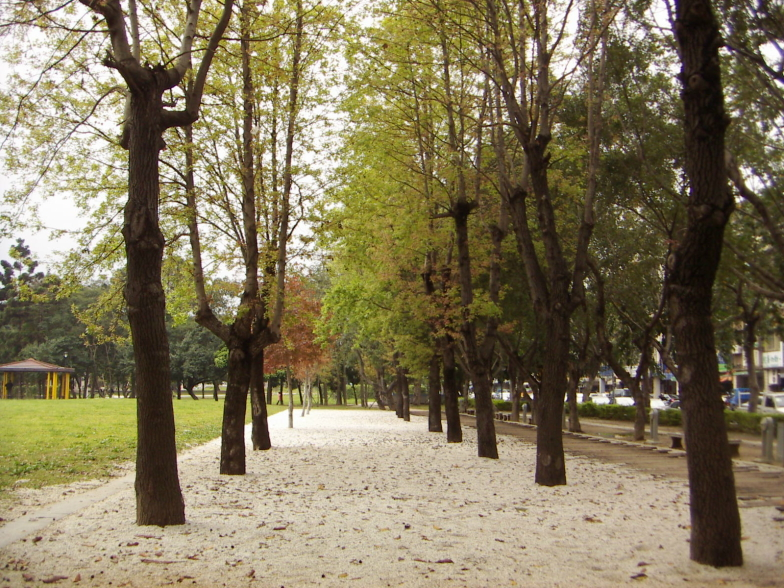
- Interactive map of Rongxing Garden Park
- Type: urban park
- Location: Zhongshan, Taipei, Taiwan
- Coordinates: 25.063440°N 121.539047°E
- Area: 6.5 hectares (16 acres)
- Opened: 1968
- Operator: Yuanshan Park Management Division
- Public transit: Zhongshan Junior High School Station

Rongxing Garden Park (traditional Chinese: 榮星花園公園; simplified Chinese: 荣星花园公园; pinyin: Róngxīng Huāyuán Gōngyuán) (also called Rongxing Garden or Rongxing Park) is an urban park in Zhongshan District, Taipei, Taiwan.

== History ==
The park was built as a private garden by Koo family in 1968. After the expropriation was completed in 1990, it is managed by Yuanshan Park Management Division.

== Geology ==
The park is the first European landscape garden in Taipei, which consists of flowers, wetlands, lotus ponds and children playground. It spans over an area of 6.5 hectares.

== Transportation ==
The park is accessible within walking distance North West from Zhongshan Junior High School Station of Taipei Metro.

== See also ==
- List of parks in Taiwan
- List of tourist attractions in Taiwan
