= Institute of Transportation =

Government agency of Taiwan

- 運輸研究所

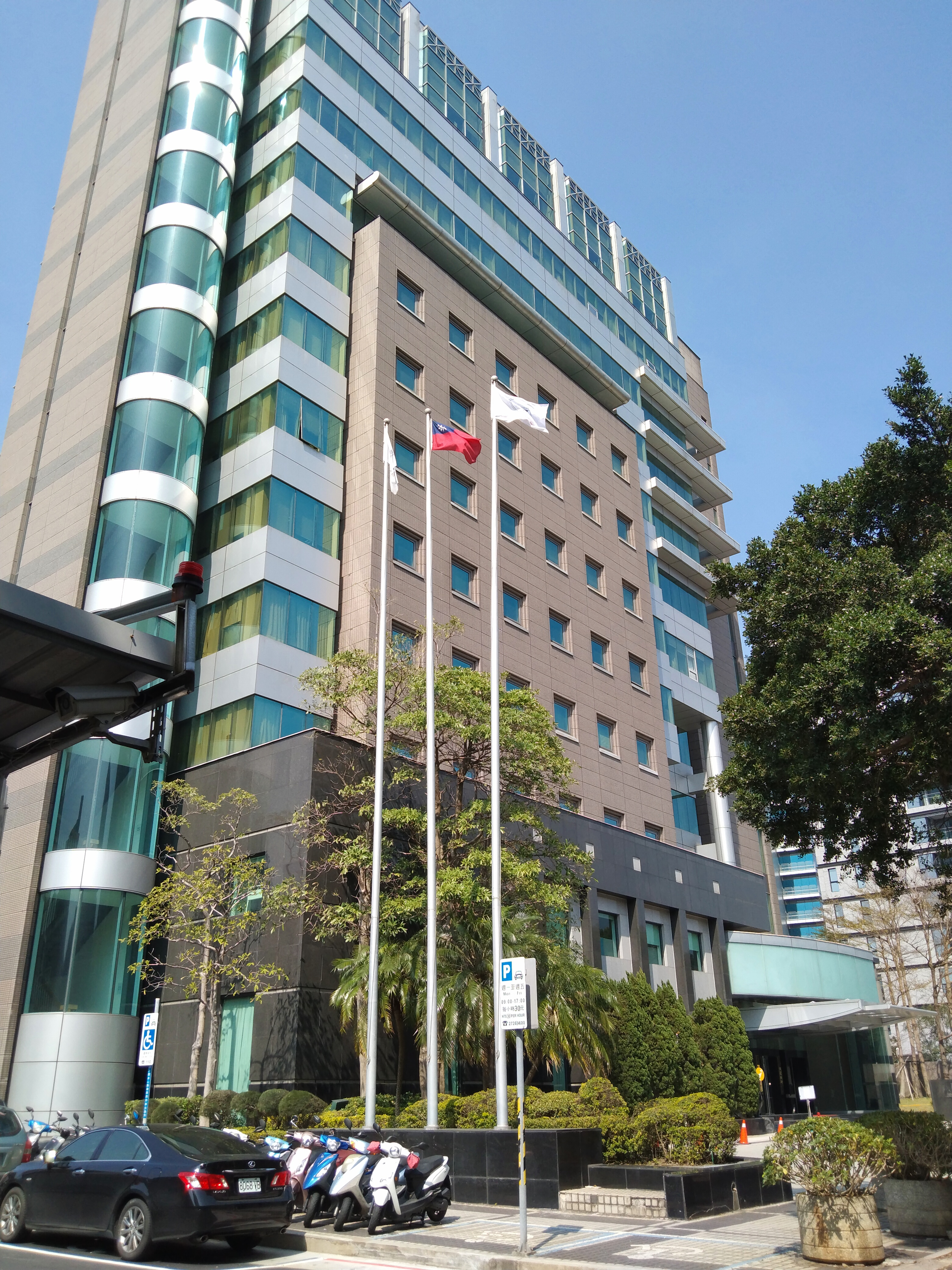
- Institute of Transportation Building

Agency overview
- Formed: 5 January 1985
- Headquarters: Songshan, Taipei, Taiwan; 25°03′36.6″N 121°32′57.8″E
- Agency executive: Lin Chi-kuo, Director-General
- Parent agency: Ministry of Transportation and Communications
- Website: Official website

The Institute of Transportation (IOT; Chinese: 運輸研究所; pinyin: Yùnshū Yánjiūsuǒ) is the organization under the Ministry of Transportation and Communications of the Republic of China responsible for assisting the ministry in making policy, coordinating and integrating transportation strategies, executing plans, supporting administrative innovative research and technology and establishing communication channel between the government, transportation industries, academia and research institutions in Taiwan.

== History ==
The institute was originally established as Transportation Planning Board (Chinese: 交通部運輸計劃委員會) on 1 August 1970. On 5 January 1985, it was merged with the former Institute of Traffic Research to establish the Institute of Transportation.

== Organizational structure ==
- Harbor and Marine Technology Center
- Interdisciplinary Research Division
- Transportation Information System Division
- Transportation Operations and Management Division
- Transportation Safety Division
- Transportation Engineering Division
- Transportation Planning Division
- Secretariat
- Accounting Office
- Personnel Office

== Director-generals ==
- Lin Chi-kuo (incumbent)
- Wu Yuh-jen (25 October 2016 - 5 June 2018)
- Chi Wen-jong (22 August 2016 - 24 October 2016)
- Lin Shinn-der (16 January 2015 - 21 August 2016)
- Lin Tyh-ming (16 July 2010 - 15 January 2015)
- Huang Der-chyr (1 March 2004 - 15 July 2010)
- Lin Dah-yuh (11 September 1997 - 29 February 2004)
- Lin Dah-yuh (1 August 1997 - 10 September 1997) (acting)
- Chang Yu-hern (1 August 1995 - 31 July 1997)
- Feng Cheng-min (1 March 1995 - 31 July 1995)
- Chang Chia-juch (1 October 1987 - 28 February 1995)
- Huang Jia-he (5 January 1985 - 30 September 1987)

== Transportation ==
The building is accessible within walking distance south from Songshan Airport Station of the Taipei Metro.

== See also ==
- Ministry of Transportation and Communications (Taiwan)
- Transportation in Taiwan
