= Dazhi metro station =

Metro station in Taipei, Taiwan

Dazhi 大直
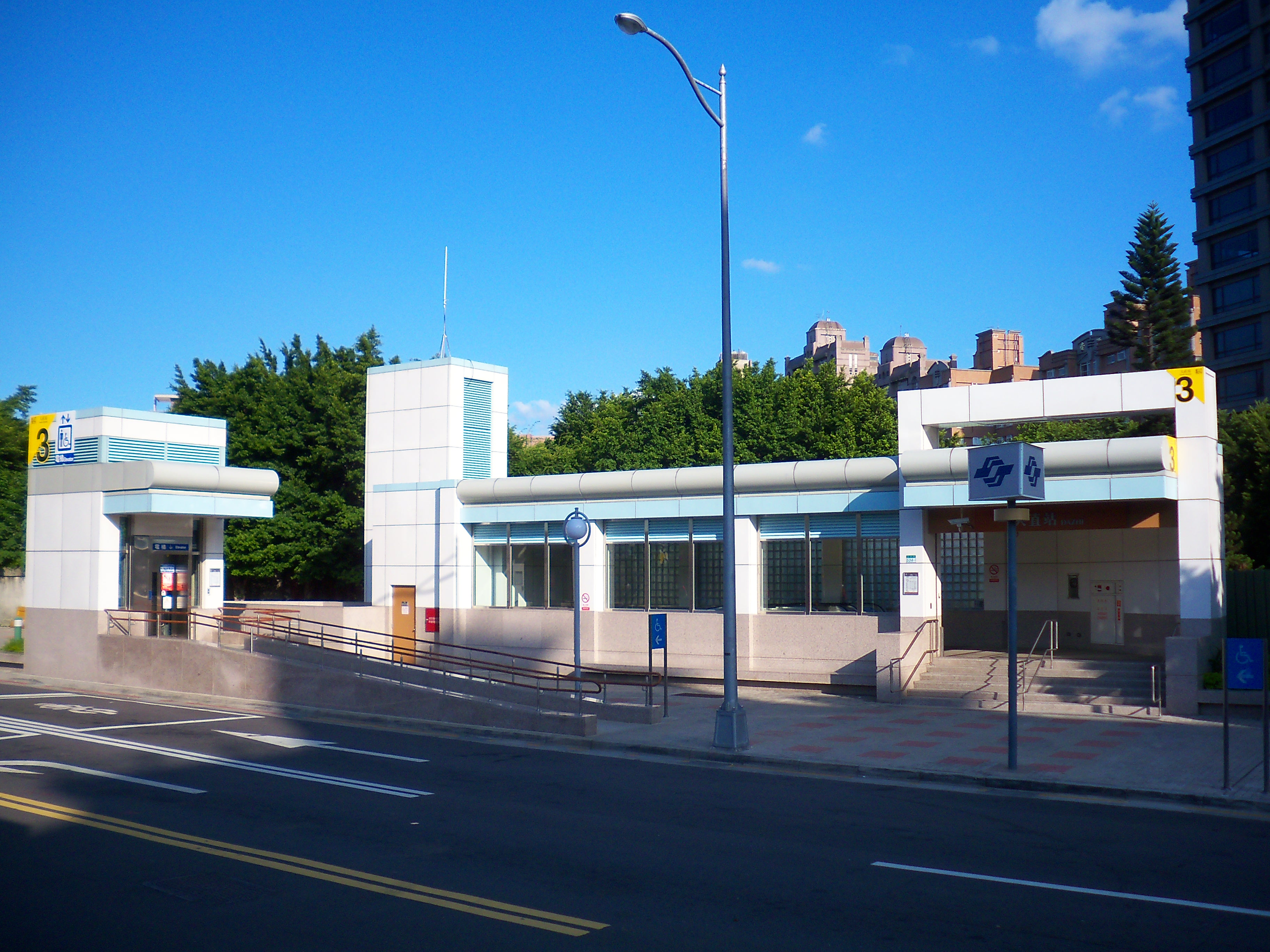

Chinese name
- Chinese: 大直
- Literal meaning: Big straight
Transcriptions
Standard Mandarin
- Hanyu Pinyin: Dàzhí
- Bopomofo: ㄉㄚˋ ㄓˊ
Hakka
- Pha̍k-fa-sṳ: Thai-chhṳ̍t
Southern Min
- Tâi-lô: Tāi-ti̍t

General information
- Other names: Shih Chien University; 實踐大學
- Location: 534-1 Bei-an Road; Zhongshan, Taipei; Taiwan
- Coordinates: 25.079596°N 121.546903°E
- Operator: Taipei Metro
- Line: Wenhu line (BR14)
- Connections: Bus stop

Construction
- Structure type: Underground

Other information
- Station code: BR14

History
- Opened: 4 July 2009

Passengers
- daily (December 2024) (Ranked of 119)
- Rank: 77 out of 109

Services
Preceding station	Taipei Metro	Following station
Songshan Airport towards Taipei Zoo	Wenhu line	Jiannan Road towards Nangang Exhib Center
Location

The Taipei Metro Dazhi station is located in the Zhongshan District in Taipei, Taiwan. It is a station of the Brown line.

== Station overview ==
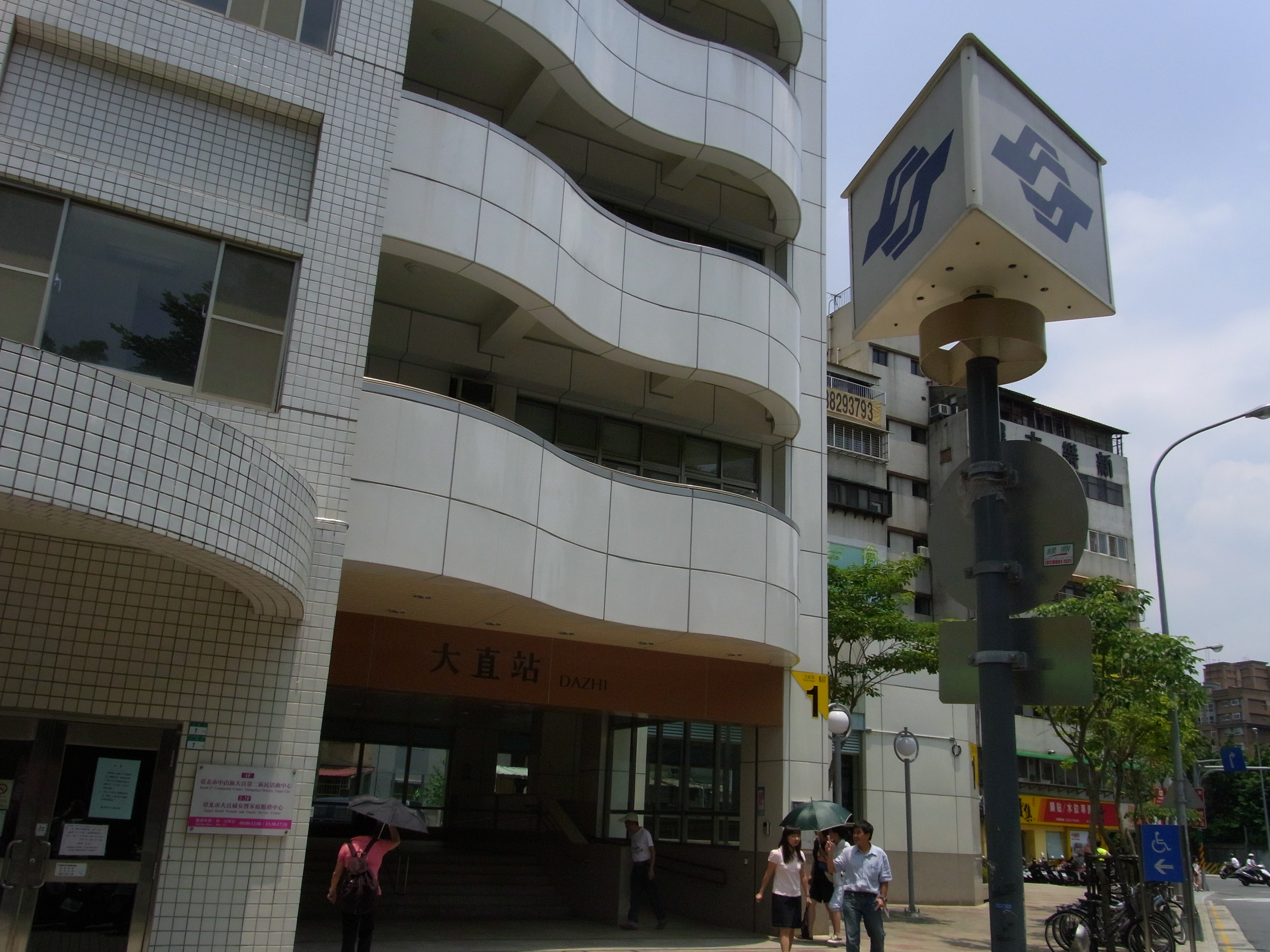
Dazhi station exit 1

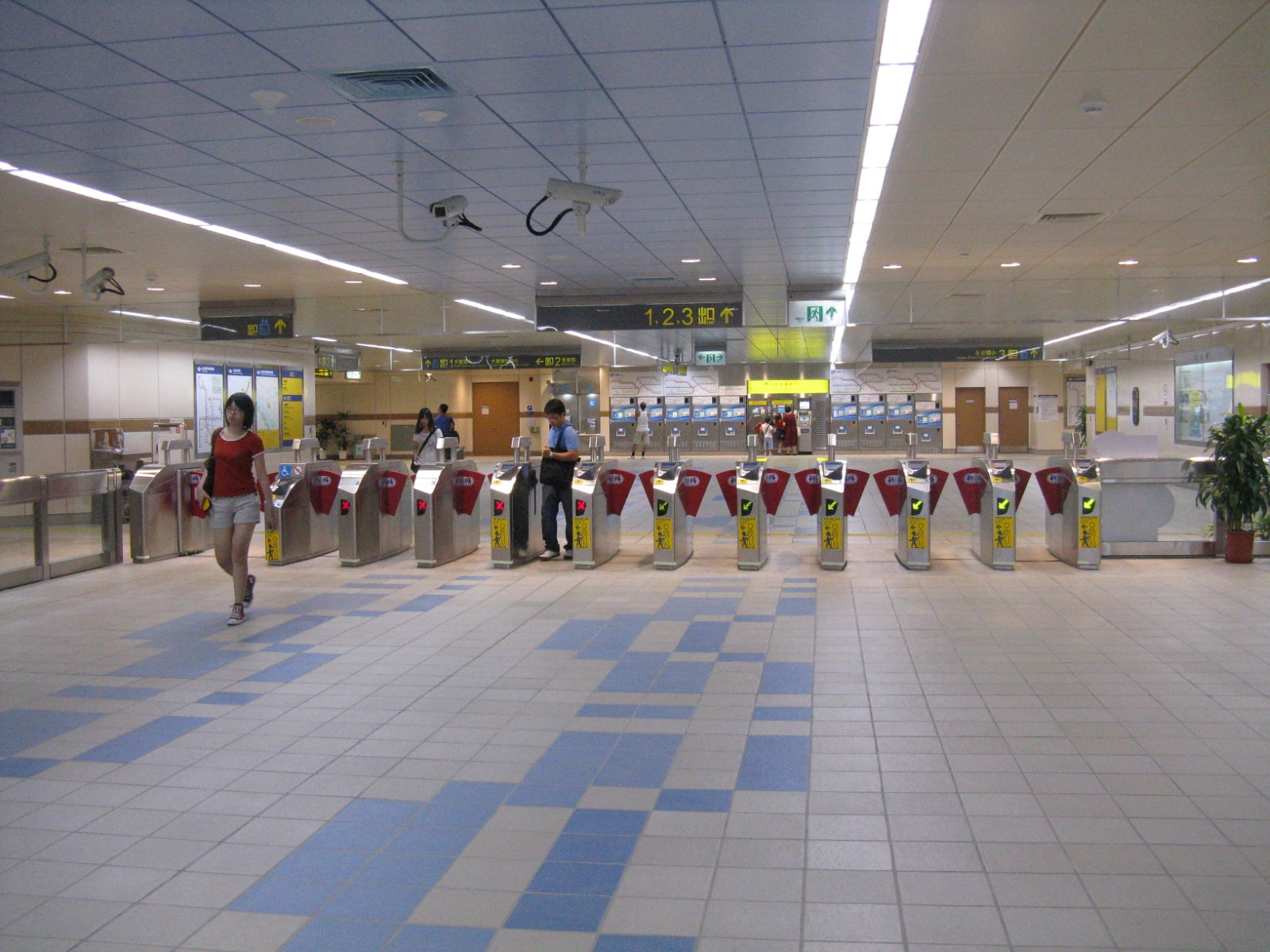
Dazhi station faregates

This two-level, underground station features an island platform, three exits, and a platform elevator located on the south side of the concourse level. This station, along with Songshan Airport station, are the only two underground stations on the Wenhu line. They are also the first underground stations in the system to have platform doors.

The platform level is 159 meters long, while the platform itself is 83 metres (272 ft) long and 17.86 metres (58.6 ft) wide.

The theme for this station is "Landscape".

== History ==
- 23 May 2002: Construction begins on Dazhi station.
- 28 April 2008: Construction is completed.
- 4 July 2009: Begins service with opening of Brown line.

== Station layout ==
1F	Street level	Entrance/exit
B1	Concourse	Lobby, information desk, automatic ticket dispensing machines, one-way faregates, restrooms
B2	Platform 1	← Wenhu line toward Taipei Nangang Exhibition Center (BR15 Jiannan Road)
B2	Island platform, doors will open on the left
B2	Platform 2	→ Wenhu line toward Taipei Zoo (BR13 Songshan Airport) →

=== Exits ===
- Exit 1: Da-zhi St. (Da-zhi Community)
- Exit 2: Intersection of Bei-an and Da-zhi St.
- Exit 3: Intersection of Bei-an and Da-zhi St.

== Around the stations ==
- Dajia Riverside Park
- National Revolutionary Martyrs' Shrine
- Shih Chien University
- Straits Exchange Foundation
- Yingfeng Riverside Park
- Dominican International School
