= Songshan District, Taipei =

District in Taipei, Taiwan

Coordinates: 25.059788°N 121.55727°E

Songshan 松山區 Matsuyama
- District
- Songshan District
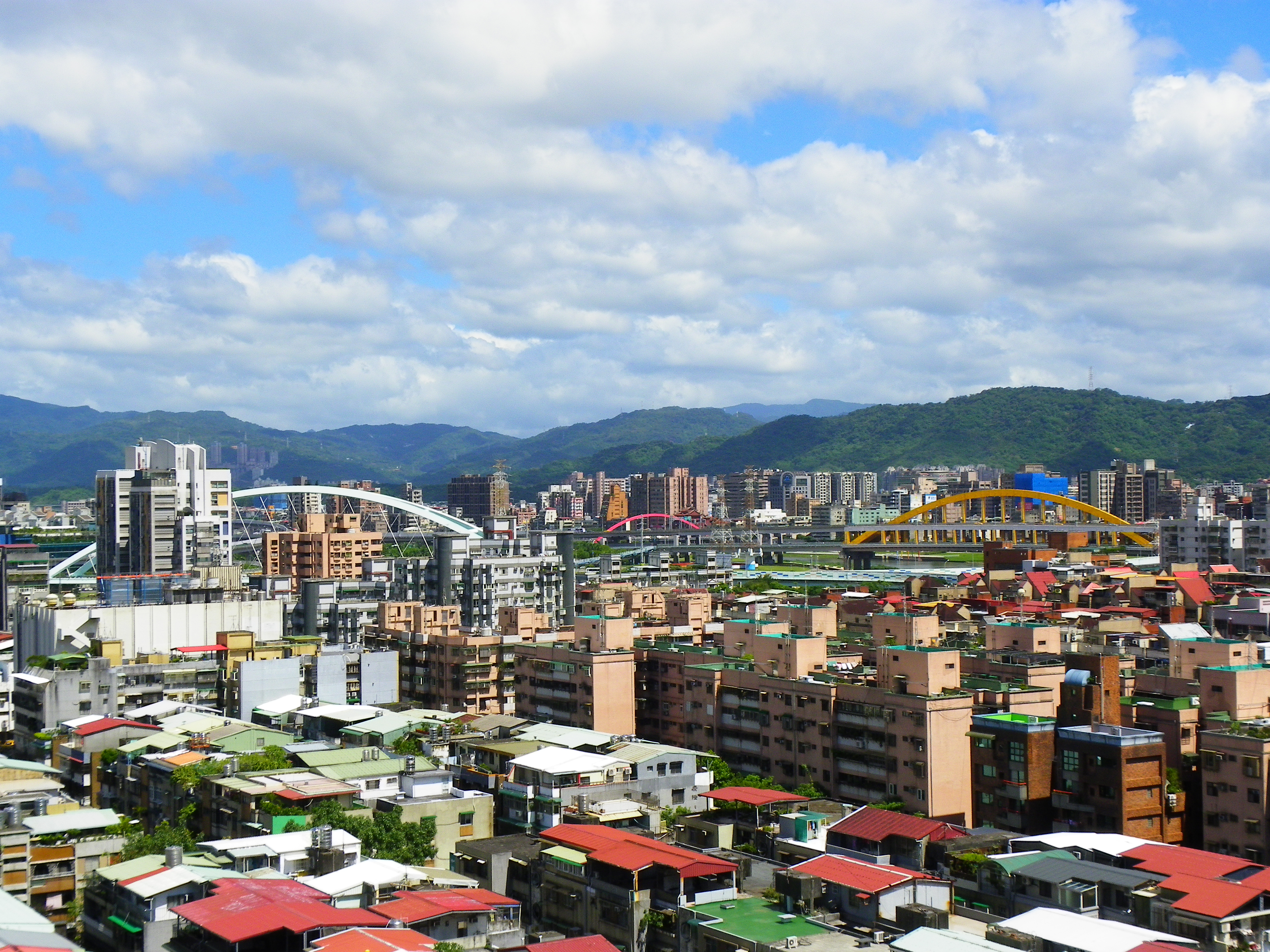
- The Raohe Street Night Market in Songshan

- Country: Republic of China (Taiwan)
- Region: Eastern Taipei
- Divisions: List: 33 boroughs; 760 neighborhoods

Area
  - Total: 9.2878 km^{2} (3.5860 sq mi)
  - Rank: Ranked 9th of 12

Population (January 2023)
  - Total: 190,772
  - Rank: Ranked 8th of 12
  - Density: 20,540/km^{2} (53,199/sq mi)
- Postal code: 105
- Website: ssdo.gov.taipei (in Chinese)

Songshan District, Taipei

Chinese name
- Traditional Chinese: 松山區
Transcriptions
Standard Mandarin
- Hanyu Pinyin: Sōngshān Qū
- Wade–Giles: Sung^{1}-shan^{1} Ch'ü^{1}
Southern Min
- Hokkien POJ: Siông-san-khu

former name
- Traditional Chinese: 錫口
Transcriptions
Southern Min
- Hokkien POJ: Sek-kháu

Japanese name
- Kanji: 松山
- Hiragana: まつやま
Transcriptions
- Romanization: Matsuyama

Songshan District is a district of Taipei, Taiwan. The district notably harbors the Songshan Airport and the Taipei Arena.

== History ==
Songshan was originally named Malysyakkaw, a lowland Ketagalan word meaning "where the river curves". Its written form (Chinese: 麻里折口; Pe̍h-ōe-jī: Bâ-lí-chek-kháu) was abbreviated (錫口; Sek-kháu) in 1815 during Qing rule.

During Japanese rule (1895-1945), the area served as a prime tea-growing area in northern Taiwan. In 1920, the area's settlements were established as Matsuyama Village (Japanese: 松山庄), Shichisei District, Taihoku Prefecture. The village, named after the pine trees on a nearby hill, was incorporated into Taihoku City (modern-day Taipei) in 1938.

At the outset the Mandarin Chinese reading of the kanji characters 松山 (i.e. Sung-shan) was adopted as the name of the district, which in 1946 officially comprised 26 boroughs (里). In 1949, the area's tea estates gave way to military housing for lower-income Kuomintang refugee families. The bodies of many residents and political victims from Taiwan's martial law period are buried in hillside cemeteries that now overlook the Taipei 101 shopping district. By 1980, Songshan was the most populous area of the city.

In 1990, the southern half of Songshan District became Xinyi District while the northern half retained its original name. The boundary of this smaller Songshan District was altered in May 1994 when the course of Keelung River was moved slightly to the south.

== Administrative divisions ==
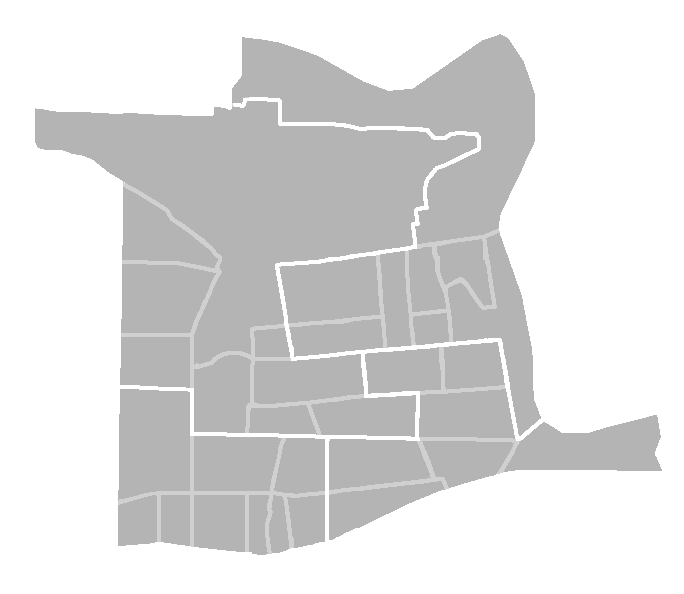
Boroughs of Songshan District

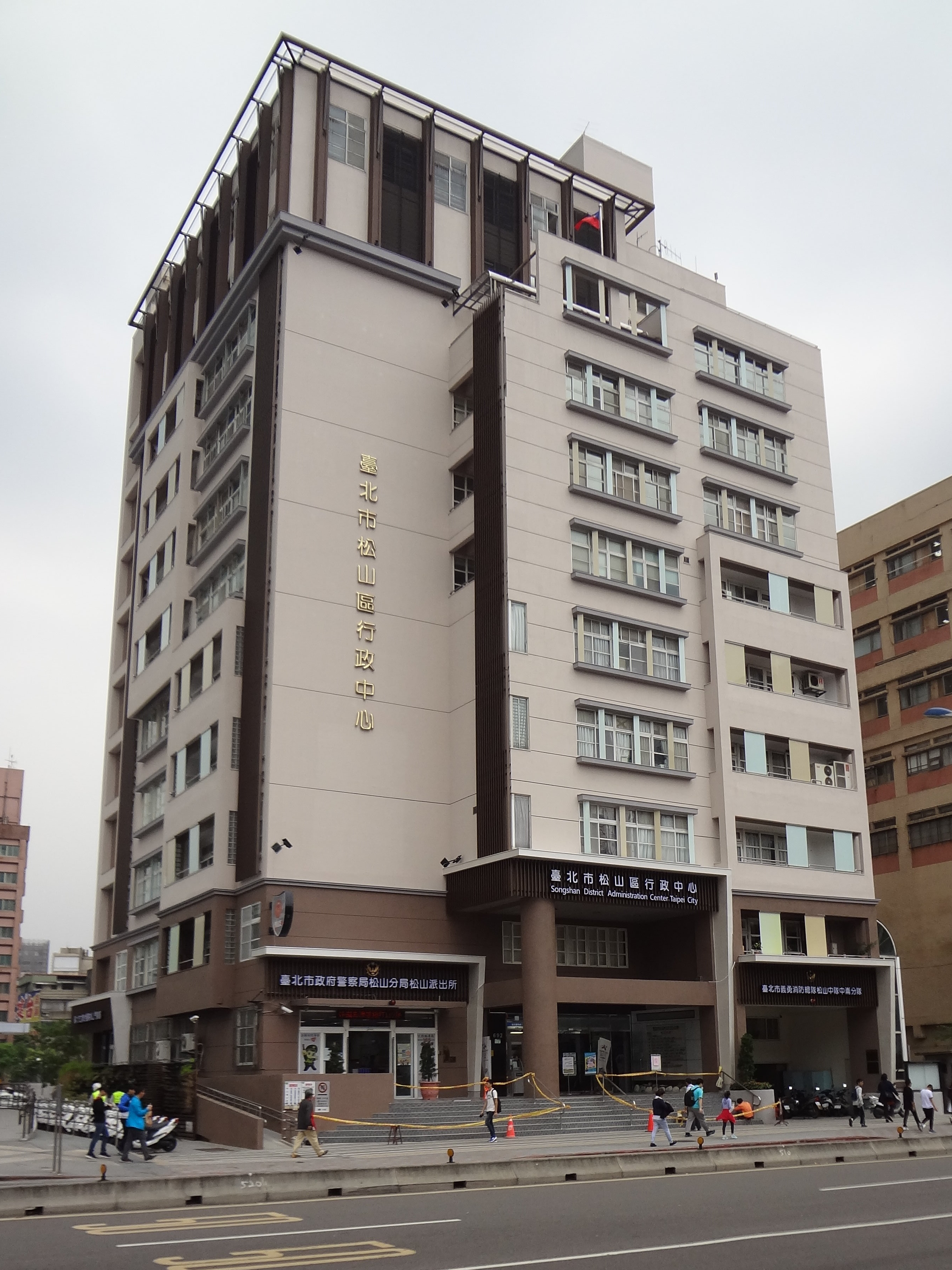
Songshan District Administration Center

Songshan is divided into four regions (地區), or secondary districts (次分區), which in turn are divided into 33 boroughs.

Type	Chinese	Hanyu Pinyin	Tongyong Pinyin	Pe̍h-ōe-jī	Notes
Region	三民次分區	Sānmín	Sanmin	Sam-bîn	northeast
Borough	莊敬里	Zhuāngjìng	Jhuangjin	Chong-kèng	
Borough	東榮里	Dōngróng	Dongrong	Tang-êng	
Borough	三民里	Sānmín	Sanmin	Sam-bîn	
Borough	新益里	Xīnyì	Sinyi	Sin-ek	
Borough	富錦里	Fùjǐn	Fujin	Hù-kím	
Borough	新東里	Xīndōng	Sindong	Sin-tang	
Borough	富泰里	Fùtài	Futai	Hù-thài	
Borough	介壽里	Jièshòu	Jieshou	Kài-siū	literally means "Longevity to Chiang Kai-shek"
Region	東社次分區	Dōngshè	Dongshe		northwest and central (largest region)
Borough	精忠里	Jīngzhōng	Jinjhong	Cheng-tiong	
Borough	東光里	Dōngguāng	Dongguang	Tang-kng	
Borough	龍田里	Lóngtián	Longtian	Liông-tiân	
Borough	東昌里	Dōngchāng	Dongchang	Tang-chhiong	
Borough	東勢里	Dōngshì	Dongshi	Tang-sì	
Borough	中華里	Zhōnghuá	Jhonghua	Tiong-hôa	
Borough	民有里	Mínyǒu	Minyou	Bîn-iú	
Borough	民福里	Mínfú	Minfu	Bîn-hok	
Borough	松基里	Sōngjī	Songji	Siông-ki	
Region	本鎮次分區	Běnzhèn	Benjheng		southeast
Borough	慈祐里	Cíyòu	Cihyou	Chû-iū	
Borough	安平里	Ānpíng	Anping	An-pêng	
Borough	鵬程里	Péngchéng	Pengcheng	Phêng-têng	
Borough	自強里	Zìqiáng	Zihciang	Chū-kiông	
Borough	吉祥里	Jíxiáng	Jisiang	Kiat-siông	
Borough	新聚里	Xīnjù	Sinjyu	Sin-chū	
Borough	復盛里	Fùshèng	Fusheng	Ho̍k-sēng	
Region	中崙次分區	Zhōnglún	Jhonglyuen	Tiong-lūn	southwest
Borough	中正里	Zhōngzhèng	Jhongjheng	Tiong-chèng	
Borough	中崙里	Zhōnglún	Jhonglyuen	Tiong-lūn	
Borough	美仁里	Měirén	Meiren	Bí-jîn	
Borough	吉仁里	Jírén	Jiren	Kiat-jîn	
Borough	敦化里	Dūnhuà	Dunhua	Tun-hòa	
Borough	復源里	Fùyuán	Fuyuan	Ho̍k-goân	
Borough	復建里	Fùjiàn	Fujian	Ho̍k-kiān	
Borough	復勢里	Fùshì	Fushi	Ho̍k-sì	
Borough	福成里	Fùchéng	Fucheng	Hok-sêng	

== Government institutions ==
- Institute of Transportation

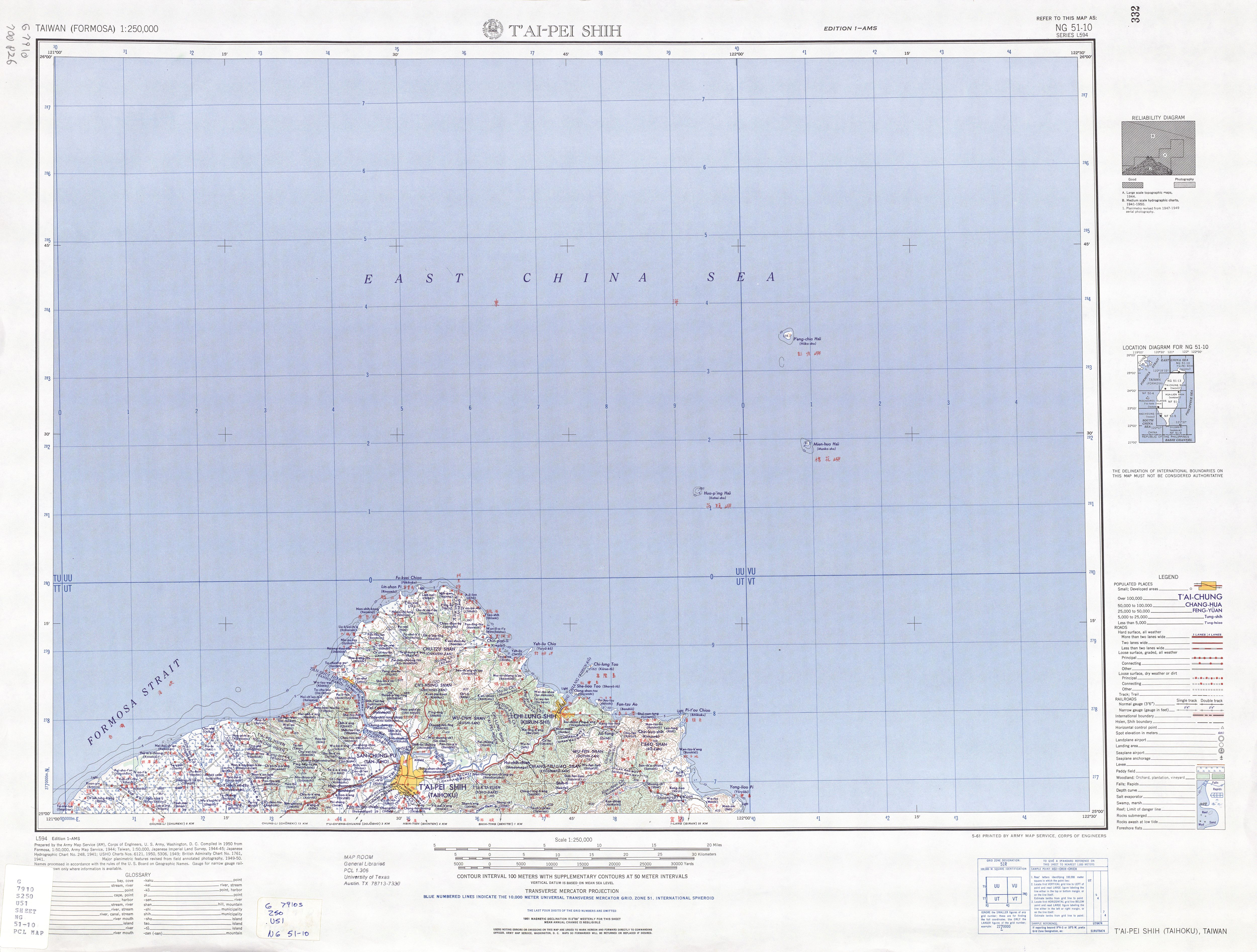
Map including Songshan (labeled as Sung-shan-chuang (Matsuyama-shō) 松山庄) (1950)

== Institutions ==
- Construction and Planning Agency
- Japan–Taiwan Exchange Association
- Belgian Office, Taipei
- Liaison Office of the Republic of South Africa
- Malaysian Friendship and Trade Centre
- Manila Economic and Cultural Office

== Economy ==
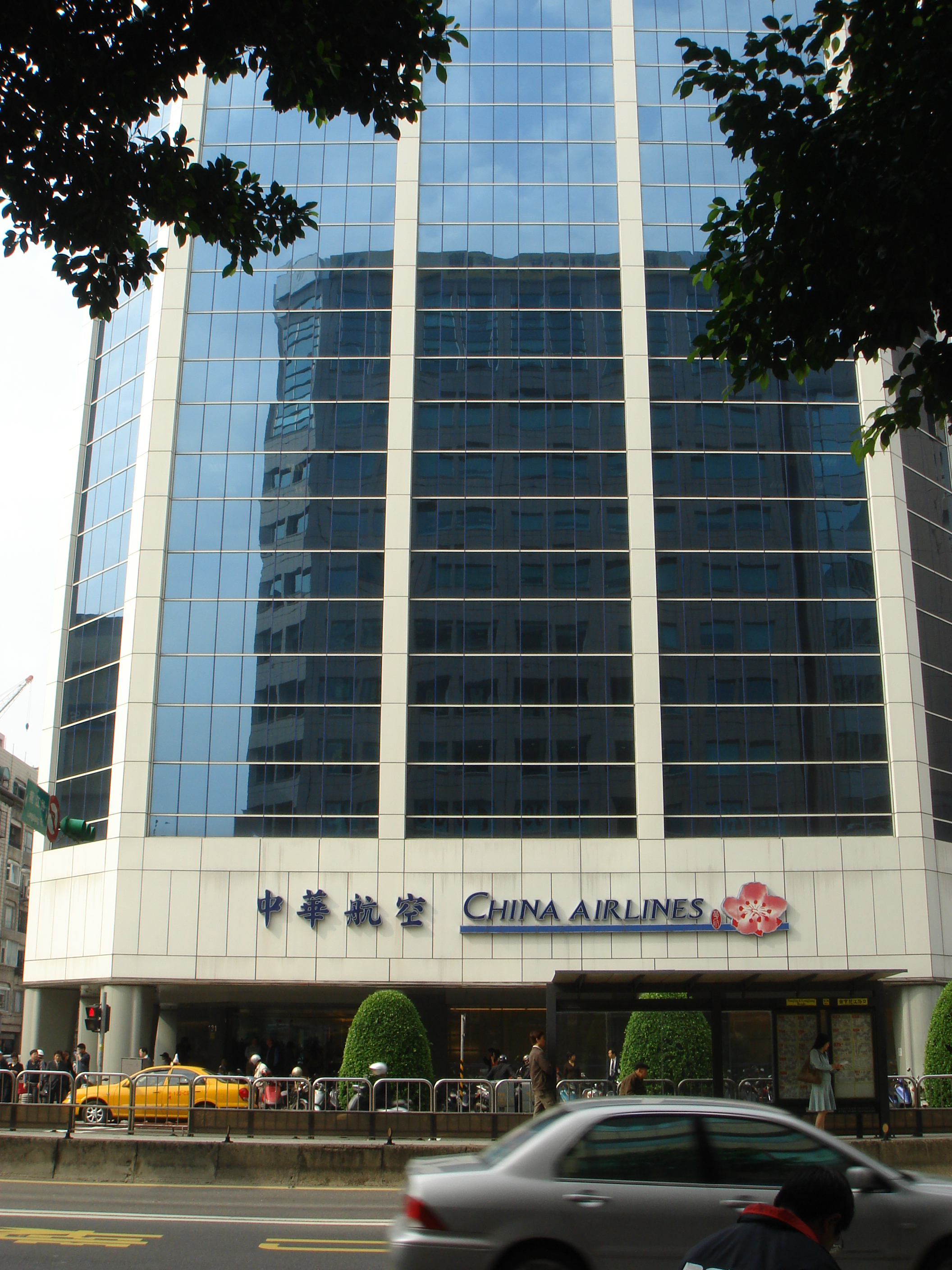
The China Airlines Taipei Branch Office and the former China Airlines headquarters in Songshan District

The district is a major financial center in Taipei, with many banking institutions located on Dunhua North Road (敦化北路) and Nanjing East Road (南京東路).

Mandarin Airlines, Daily Air and Far Eastern Air Transport have their headquarters in Songshan.

Before moving its headquarters to a new location at CAL Park, Taiwan Taoyuan International Airport, China Airlines formerly had its headquarters in the location of its current Taipei Branch Office on Nanjing E. Rd. After the headquarters were relocated, China Airlines developed part of the training center at Taipei Songshan Airport into a business aviation center.

== Infrastructures ==
- Taipei Chang Gung Memorial Hospital (part of the Chang Gung Medical Foundation)
- Taiwan Adventist Hospital

== Education ==
- National Open University — Taipei Learning Center (空中大學 台北指導中心)
- Sungshan Community College (松山社區大學): located within Zhonglun Senior High School (中崙高中), in Jixiang Village
- Taipei Municipal Zhonglun High School
- Taipei Municipal Xisong High School
- Yu Da High School of Commerce and Home Economics (私立育達高級商業家事職業學校, short 育達商職): a private vocational high school in Meiren Village

In addition, there are six middle schools, and eight elementary schools

== Tourist attractions ==
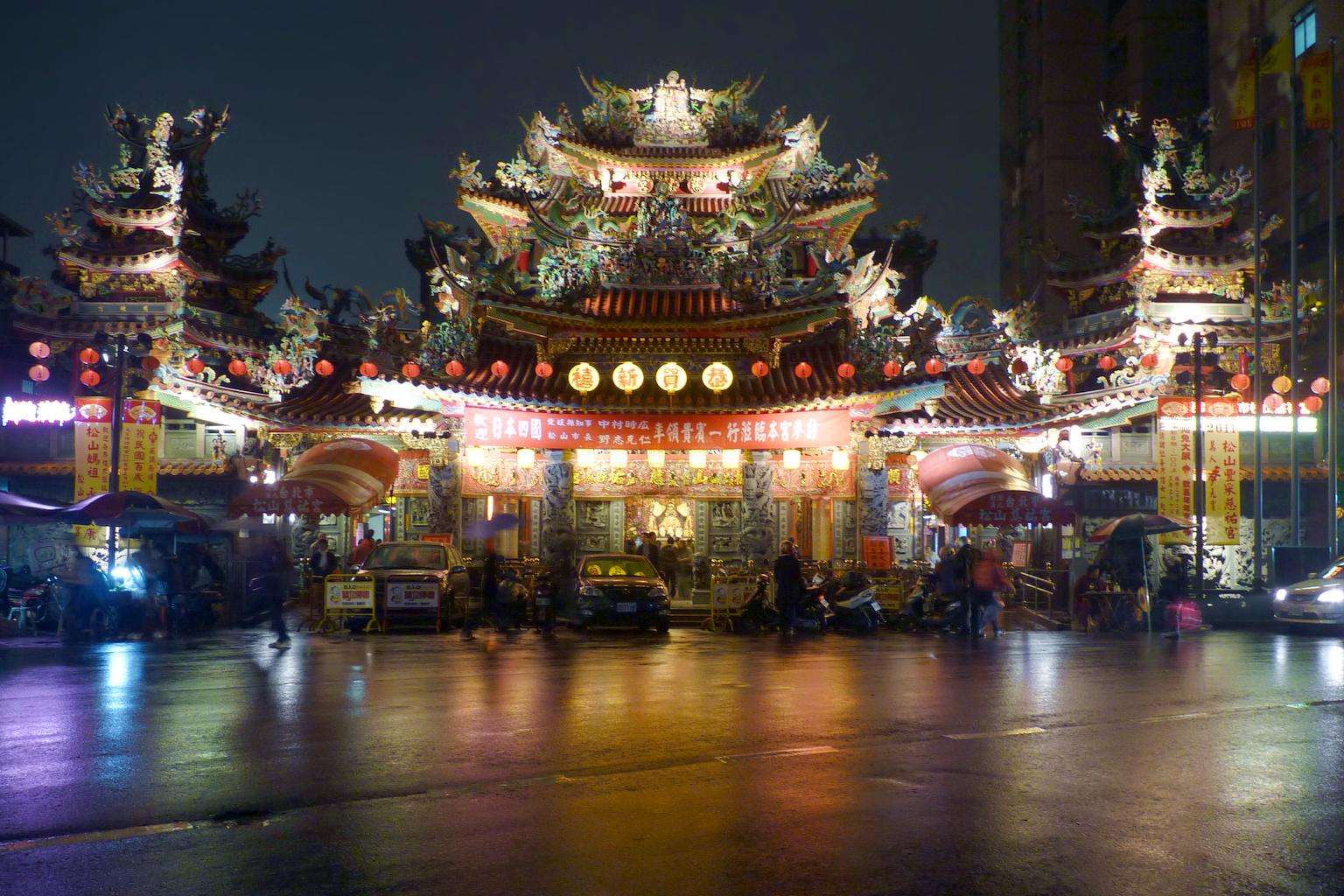
Ciyou Temple

- Breeze Center
- Ciyou Temple (松山慈祐宮)
- Puppetry Art Center of Taipei
- Raohe Street Night Market, organized in 1987, contains over 160 booths.
- Songshan Xiahai Chenghuang Temple (松山霞海城隍廟) was built in 1753.
- Taipei-Fu Chenghuang Temple (台北府城隍廟) was built in 1926.
- Fo Guang Shan Pumen Temple (佛光山普門寺) is the Taipei branch monastery of Fo Guang Shan Order.
- Taipei Arena is a modern facility that hosts events ranging from sports to concerts.
- Taipei Gymnasium
- The Metropolitan Hall is a venue for music, dancing, and theatrical performances operated by Taipei City Arts Promotion Office
- Land Reform Museum
- Aurora Art Museum
- Taiwan Stock Museum
- Yingfeng Riverside Park
- Guanshan Riverside Park
- Sanmin Park
- Xinzhong Park
- Japanese Cultural Center

== Transportation ==
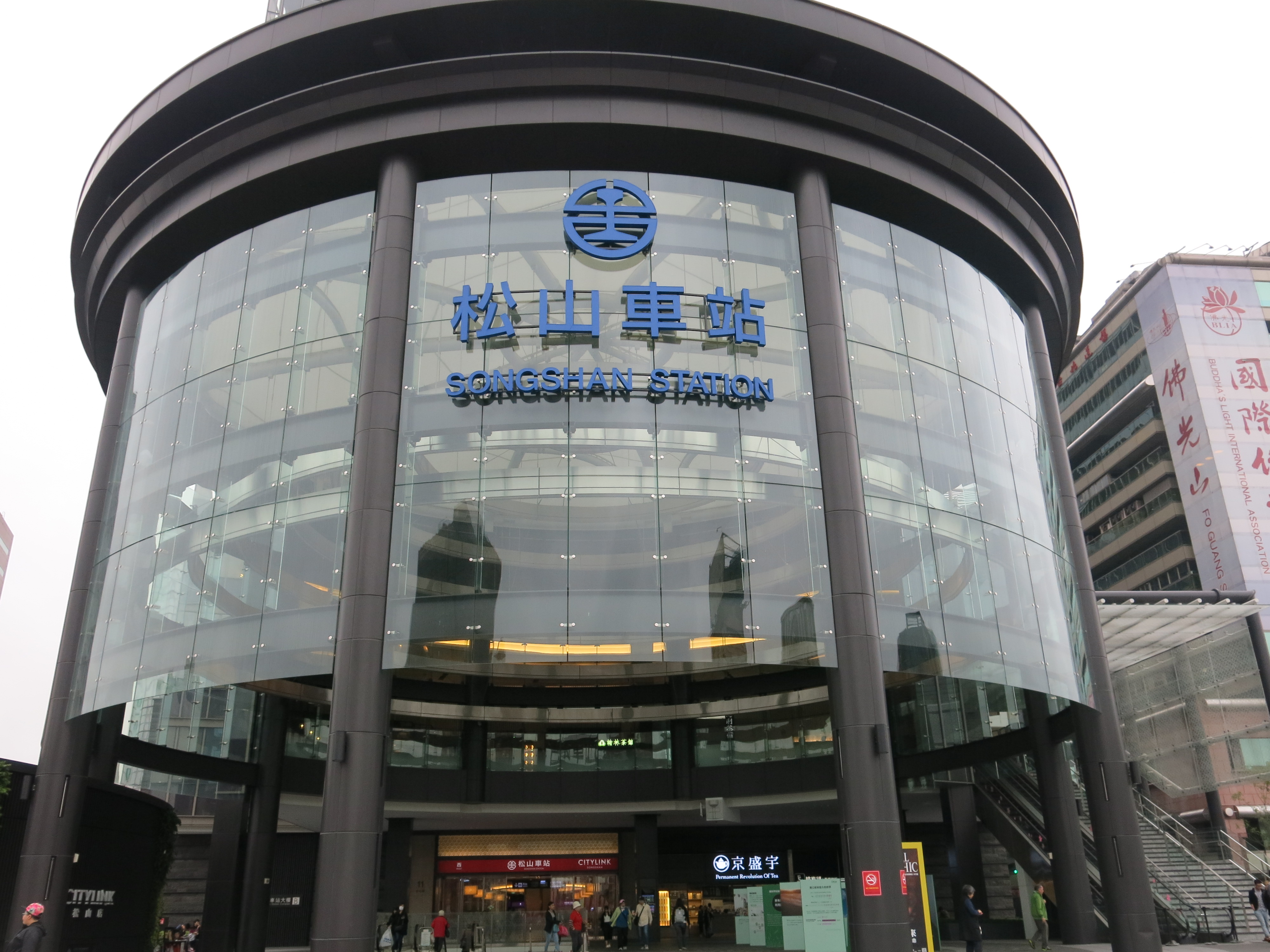
Songshan Station

=== Roads ===
Fuxing North Road (復興北路) runs along the western boundary of the district. The other major north-south road is Dunhua North Road (敦化北路). Several major east-west arteries include Minquan East Road (民權東路), Sec. 3–5; Minsheng East Road (民生東路), Sec. 3–5; Nanjing East Road (南京東路), Sec. 3–5; and Bade Road (八德路), Sec. 2–4.

The southern border is outlined by the Civic Blvd (市民大道). Meanwhile, National Highway 1 borders the northern part of the district.

=== Metro ===
The Taipei Metro serves the district via the following stations:

- Zhongshan Junior High School metro station
- Songshan Airport metro station
- Taipei Arena metro station
- Nanjing Sanmin metro station
- Songshan station
- Nanjing Fuxing metro station

=== Airport ===
Songshan Airport is located in Dongshe Region, accessible by the Taipei Metro Wenhu line's Songshan Airport metro station.

== Notable natives ==
- Ying Wei-min, actor and singer

== See also ==
- District (Taiwan)
