= Aurora Art Museum =

Museum in Songshan, Taipei, Taiwan

- 震旦藝術博物館
- Established: 2003
- Location: Songshan, Taipei, Taiwan
- Coordinates: 25°03′12″N 121°33′25″E
- Type: art museum
- Founder: Chen Yung-tai
- Owner: AURORA Group
- Public transit access: Nanjing East Road Station
- Website: Official website

This is about the museum in Taiwan; for the one in China see Aurora Art Museum (Shanghai).

The Aurora Art Museum (traditional Chinese: 震旦藝術博物館; simplified Chinese: 震旦艺术博物馆; pinyin: Zhèndàn Yìshù Bówùguǎn) is an art museum in Songshan District, Taipei, Taiwan. The museum is located in the Aurora 21st Century Building.

== History ==
The museum was founded in 2003 by the AURORA Group Chairman Chen Yung-tai to showcase thousands of exhibits he has collected over the past decades.

== Exhibitions ==
The museums exhibits jade objects, bronze wares and Buddhism-related artifacts.

== Activities ==
The museum staffs conduct studies in collaboration with the Center of Ancient Civilizations at Peking University and offer online lectures on traditional Chinese cultures.

== Transportation ==
The museum is accessible within walking distance East from Nanjing East Road Station of the Taipei Metro.

== See also ==
- List of museums in Taiwan
