= Taipei Fish Market =

Fish market in Zhongshan, Taipei, Taiwan

Taipei Fish Market 台北漁市
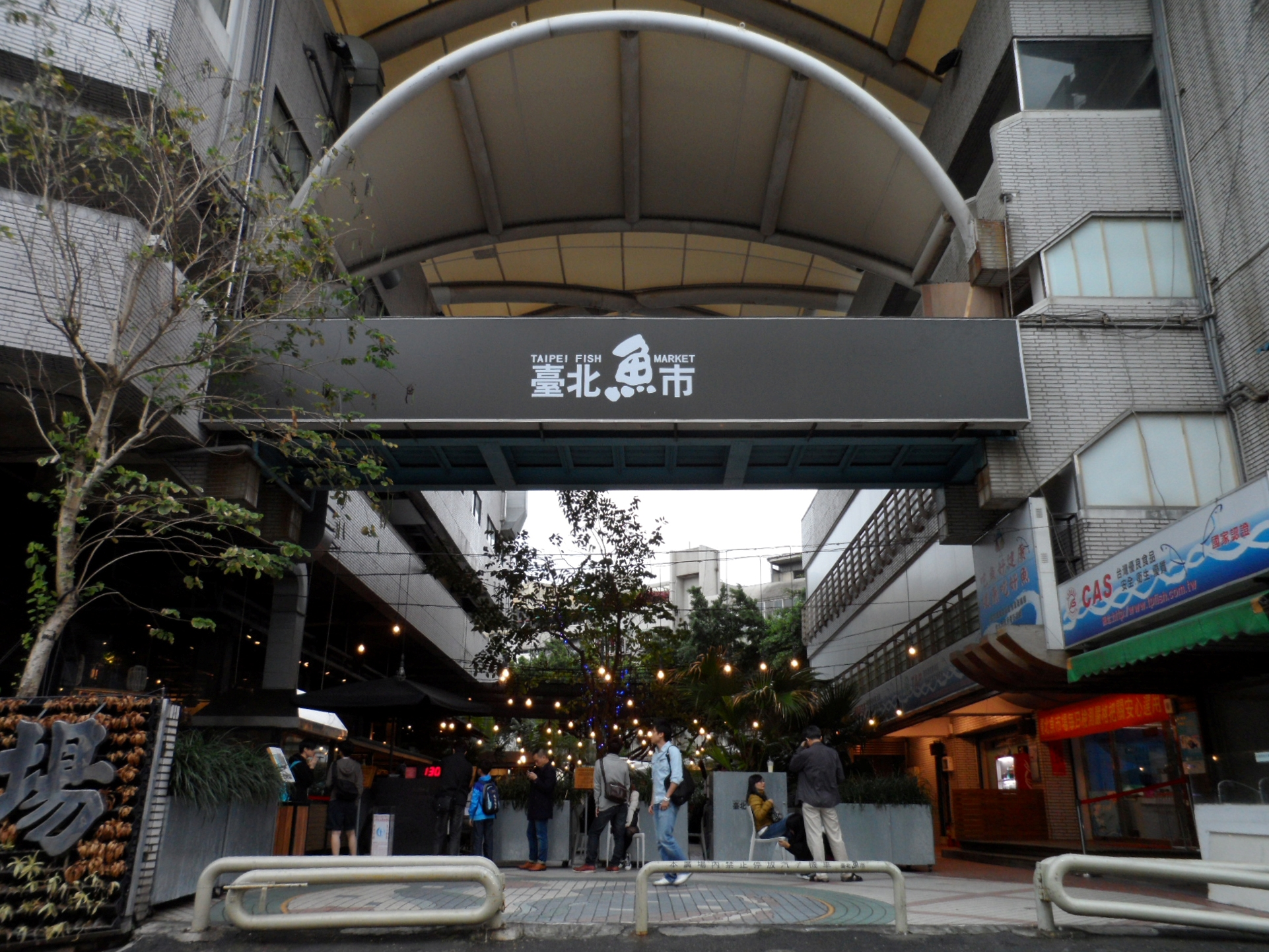
- Location: Zhongshan, Taipei, Taiwan; 25.066773°N 121.536737°E
- Goods sold: seafood
- Website: Official website (in Chinese)
- Interactive map of Taipei Fish Market

The Taipei Fish Market (traditional Chinese: 台北漁市; simplified Chinese: 台北渔市; pinyin: Táiběi Yúshì) is a fish market in Zhongshan District, Taipei, Taiwan.

== History ==
The fish market was originally a traditional fish market. In 2012, it was redeveloped into a more modern fish market by Mitsui Food and Beverage Enterprise Group.

== Architecture ==
The market features some seafood restaurants.

== Transportation ==
The market is accessible within walking distance North West from Zhongshan Junior High School Station of the Taipei Metro.

== See also ==
- List of tourist attractions in Taiwan
