= Zhongshan Junior High School metro station =

Metro station in Taipei, Taiwan

Zhongshan Junior High School 中山國中
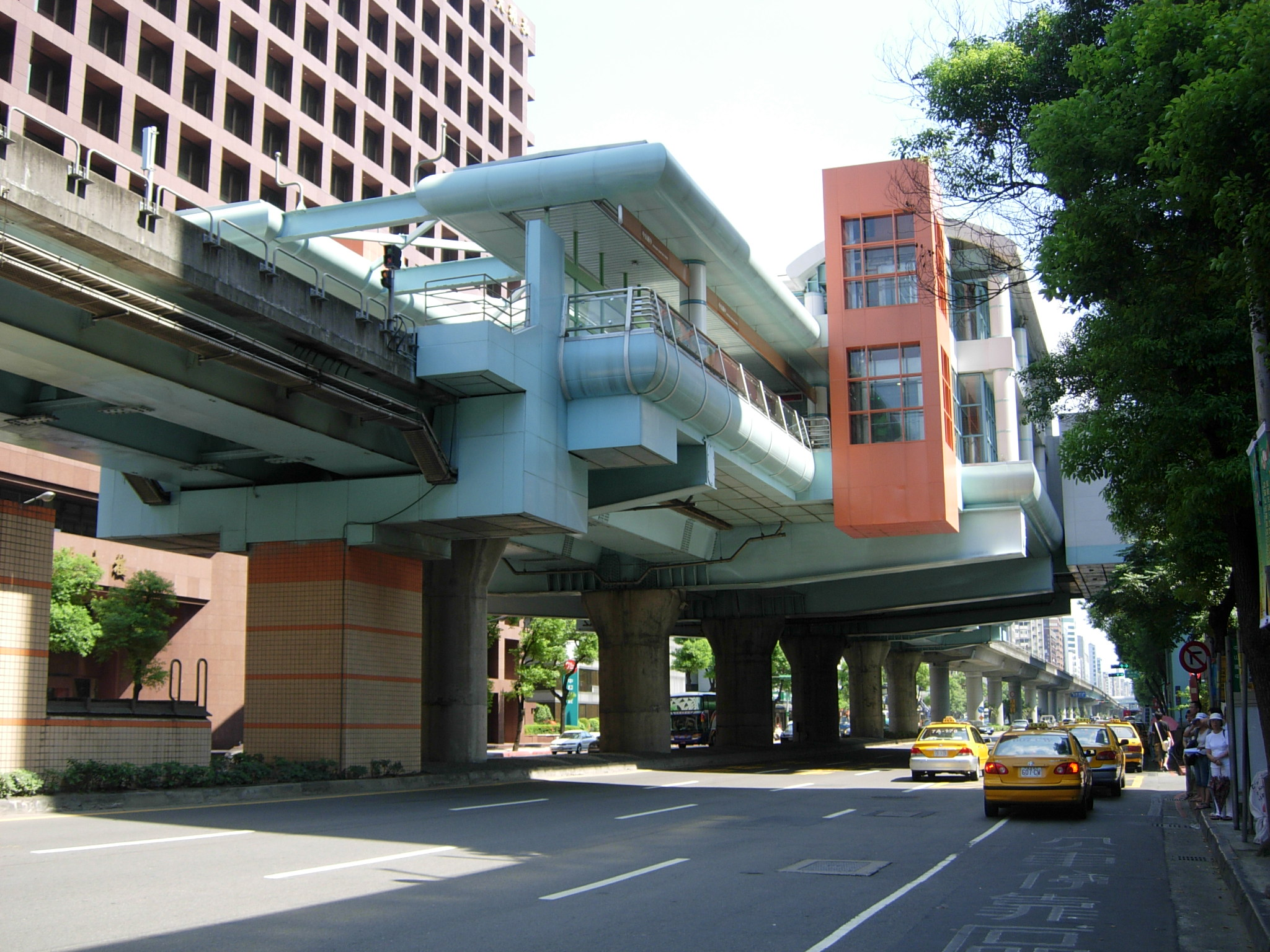

Chinese name
- Traditional Chinese: 中山國中
- Simplified Chinese: 中山国中
Transcriptions
Standard Mandarin
- Hanyu Pinyin: Zhōngshān Guózhōng
- Bopomofo: ㄓㄨㄥ ㄕㄢ ㄍㄨㄛˊ ㄓㄨㄥ
Hakka
- Pha̍k-fa-sṳ: Chûng-sân Koet-chûng
Southern Min
- Tâi-lô: Tiong-san Kok-tiong

General information
- Location: No. 376, Fuxing N. Rd. Zhongshan and Songshan Districts, Taipei; Taiwan
- Coordinates: 25.060784°N 121.544189°E
- Operator: Taipei Metro
- Line: Wenhu line
- Connections: Bus stop

Construction
- Structure type: Elevated

Other information
- Station code: BR12

History
- Opened: 28 March 1996
- Former names: Chungshan Junior High School station

Passengers
- daily (December 2024)
- Rank: 71 out of 109 and 5 others

Services
Preceding station	Taipei Metro	Following station
Nanjing Fuxing towards Taipei Zoo	Wenhu line	Songshan Airport towards Nangang Exhib Center
Location

Zhongshan Junior High School station (formerly transliterated as Chungshan Junior High School station until 2003) is a station on the Wenhu line of the Taipei Metro, located on the border between the Zhongshan and Songshan districts in Taipei, Taiwan. It is named after the Zhongshan Junior High School.

== Station overview ==
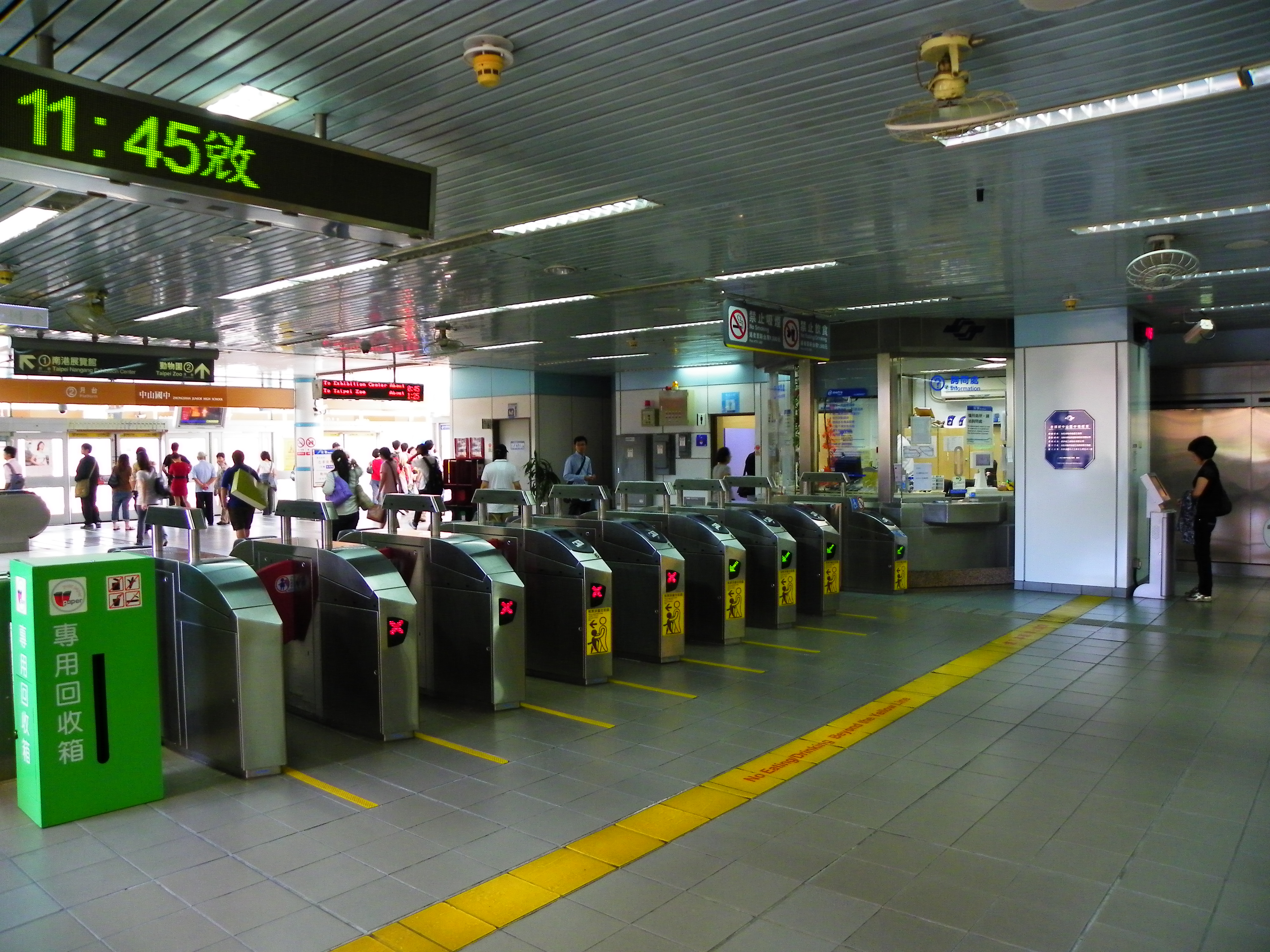
Concourse of Zhongshan Junior High School station

This three-level, elevated station has two side platforms located at level 3, together with the connecting level at level 4. It has four exits, and is connected to a nearby office building. Prior to the opening of the Neihu section, it served as the northern terminal station for Brown Line. The concourse level and ticket machines are at level 2.

== Station layout ==
4F	Connecting level	Platforms-connecting overpass
3F
3F	Concourse
3F	Concourse	Lobby, information desk, automatic ticket dispensing machines, one-way faregates, restrooms
3F	Side platform, doors will open on the right
3F	Platform 1	← Wenhu line toward Taipei Nangang Exhibition Center (BR13 Songshan Airport)
3F	Platform 2	→ Wenhu line toward Taipei Zoo (BR11 Nanjing Fuxing) →
3F	Side platform, doors will open on the right

2F	Mezzanine	Transitlink floor for stairs and escalators

1F	Street level	Exit/entrance

=== Exits ===
- Exit 1: Near the intersection of Minquan E. Rd. Sec. 3 and Fuxing N. Rd.

== Around the station ==
- Rongxing Garden Park
- Taipei Fish Market
