= Songshan Airport metro station =

Metro station in Taipei, Taiwan

Songshan Airport 松山機場
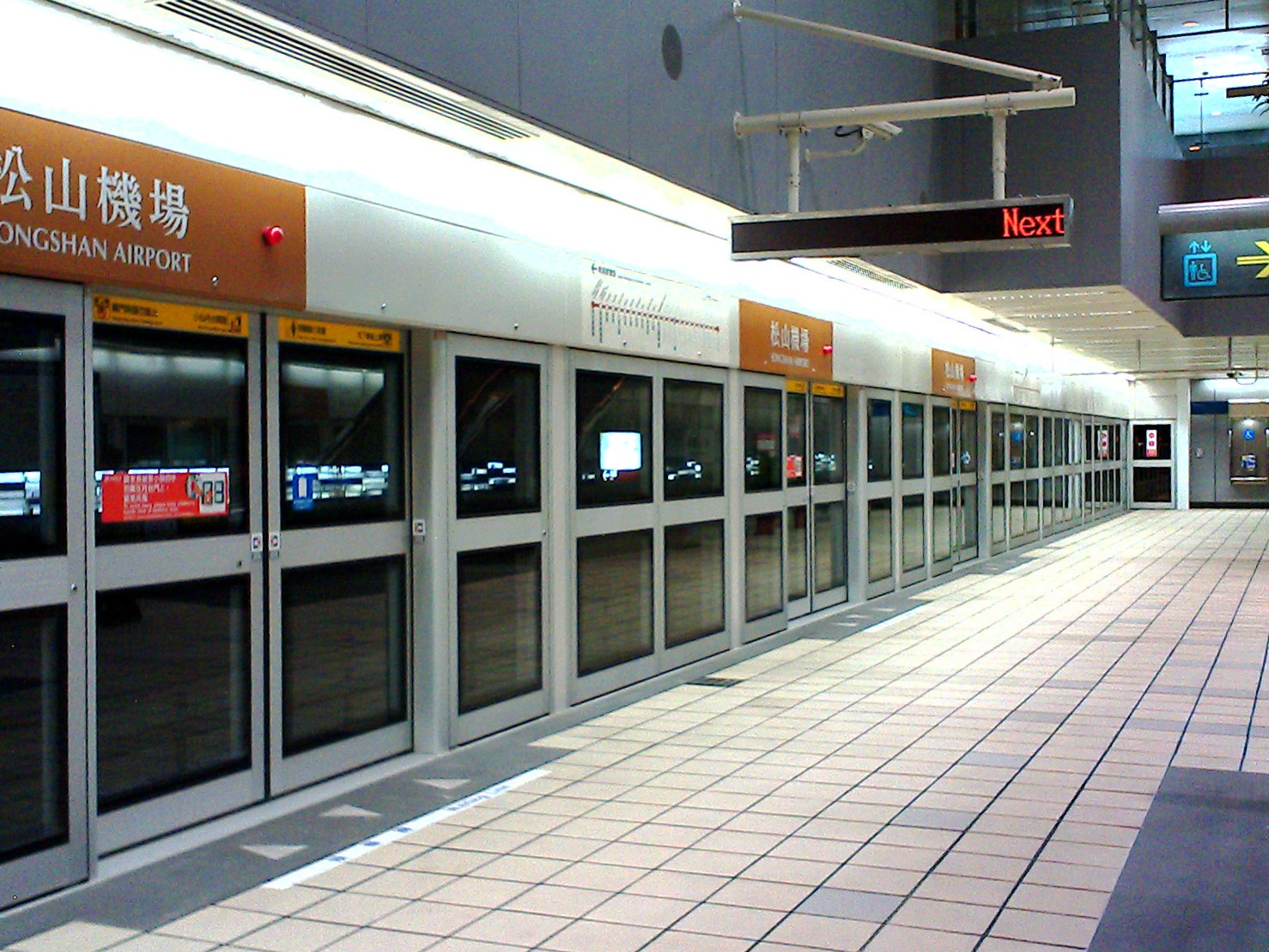
- Songshan Airport station platform

Chinese name
- Traditional Chinese: 松山機場
- Simplified Chinese: 松山机场
Transcriptions
Standard Mandarin
- Hanyu Pinyin: Sōngshān Jīchǎng
- Bopomofo: ㄙㄨㄥ ㄕㄢ ㄐㄧ ㄔㄤˇ
Hakka
- Pha̍k-fa-sṳ: Chhiùng-sân Kî-chhòng
Southern Min
- Tâi-lô: Siông-san ki-tiûnn

General information
- Location: No. 338, Dunhua N. Road, Songshan, Taipei; Taiwan
- Coordinates: 25.063144°N 121.551664°E
- Operator: Taipei Metro
- Line: Wenhu line
- Connections: Bus stop

Construction
- Structure type: Underground

Other information
- Station code: BR13

History
- Opened: 4 July 2009

Passengers
- daily (December 2024)
- Rank: 96 out of 109

Services
Preceding station	Taipei Metro	Following station
Zhongshan Junior High School towards Taipei Zoo	Wenhu line	Dazhi towards Nangang Exhib Center
Location

The Taipei Metro Songshan Airport station is located in Songshan, Taipei, Taiwan. It is a station on the Wenhu line, serving Taipei Songshan Airport.

== Station overview ==
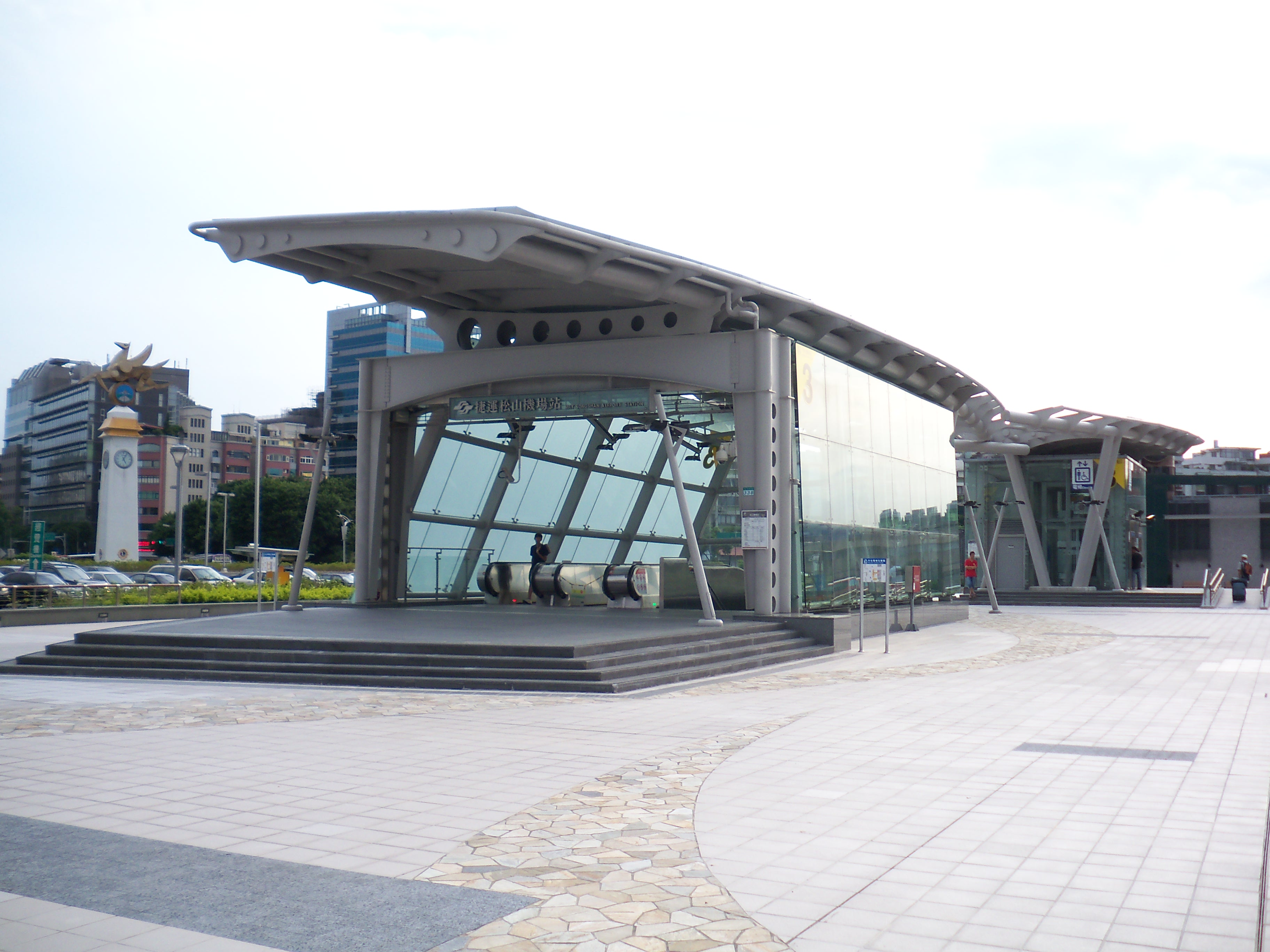
Songshan Airport station exit 3

This four-level, underground station features an island platform and three exits. It is 150 meters long, 20 meters wide, and is accessible from Songshan Airport via a 42-meter long underground cross passage. This station is one of the only two underground stations on the Wenhu line, the other being Dazhi station. They are also the first underground stations in the system to have platform doors.

In addition to developing food facilities in the underground passage connecting the station to the airport, an "airport library" will also be opened.

From 30 March 1936 until 1976, there was also a Songshan Airport station located on the now-defunct TRA Songshan Airport Line which was linked to Songshan Station by an intermediate station (Songshan Power Plant Station), but the TRA station was built at a different location from the present Metro station.

=== History ===
- 15 April 2003: Construction of the station begins.
- December 2005: Work on the underground cross passage to Taipei Songshan Airport begins.
- 28 July 2008: Construction of the station is completed.
- 4 July 2009: Begins operations with the opening of Brown line.

== Station layout ==
1F	Street level	Entrance/exit
B1	Connecting level	Moving walkway toward the Songshan Airport terminal, CAA subsidiary space
B2	Concourse	Lobby, information desk, automatic ticket dispensing machines, one-way faregates, restrooms
B3	Connecting Level	Stairs and escalators to platform
B4	Platform 1	← Wenhu line toward Taipei Nangang Exhibition Center (BR14 Dazhi)
B4	Island platform, doors will open on the left
B4	Platform 2	→ Wenhu line toward Taipei Zoo (BR12 Zhongshan Junior High School) →

=== Station exits ===
All exits are accessible by escalator, elevator, and stairs.

- Exit 1: East side of Taipei Songshan Airport
- Exit 2: West side of Taipei Songshan Airport
- Exit 3: 40 meters in front of Taipei Songshan Airport

== Public art ==
Because of the station's proximity to Songshan Airport, many of the public art works in the station revolve around flight and travel. The overall theme for the station is "The Story of Flight". The artworks were selected as part of a contest, with the open selection process beginning in July 2006 and winners announced in December 2006.

Grand Tour
Materials: Glass (clear), matte steel (white)
Location: Exit 3 Square
Description: In this age, travel is no longer a dream but something you can do at any time. This piece features a large glass and metal suitcase.

Flying Projects
Materials: Black steel, LED lights, glass, matte stainless steel
Location: Ticketing area wall, concourse level
Description: To mankind, flight brings about freedom. This piece represents mankind's enthusiasm for flight.

Dreams of Flying
Materials: Stainless steel, aluminum, canvas flame retardants, steel gears
Location: Ceiling, platform level
Description: In order to realize dreams of flying, mankind created different machines to achieve it. These pieces all represent man-powered machines and were made from everyday objects.

== Around the station ==
- Taipei Songshan Airport
- Civil Aeronautics Administration, MOTC
- Institute of Transportation
- Aviation Police Office, Taipei Branch
- Minzu Elementary School
- Dunhua Park
